= Darunta training camp =

Military training camp

Coordinates: 34°29′34″N 70°22′00″E

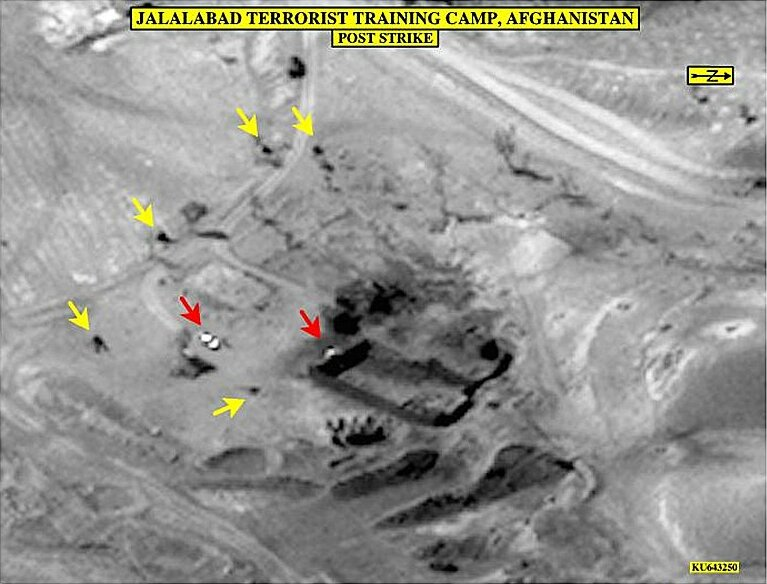
Surveillance photo of the Darunta training camp after U.S. bombardment.

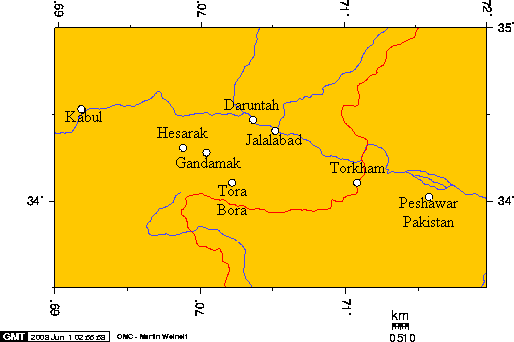
Darunta, Kabul, Peshawar, and some cities in Nangarhar, Afghanistan.

The Darunta training camp (also transliterated as Derunta) was one of the most well-known of many military training camps that have been alleged to have been affiliated with al Qaeda.

== Training with poisons ==
CNN published a story in which they claimed to have acquired videotapes showing al Qaeda experiments poisoning dogs with chemical weapons, at Darunta.

== Location ==
The camp is reported to have been near Jalalabad. According to The Guardian, it was 15 miles from Jalalabad, just north of the village of Darunta across the dam. According to a paper by Hekmat Karzai, published by the Pentagon the camp was really a complex of four camps, eight miles from Jalalabad. Karzai wrote that the four camps were:

Abu Khabab camp	includes an explosives depot;
Assadalah Abdul Rahman camp	operated by Assadalah Abdul Rahman -- "the son of blind cleric Omar Abdel Rahman"
Hizbi Islami Camp	"operated by a group of Pakistani extremists fighting in Kashmir"
Taliban camp	"where religious militia were trained and indoctrinated to fight the Northern Alliance."

The CIA provided intelligence, pinpointing Osama bin Laden's presence, that enabled Northern Alliance allies to bombard him in at the Darunta camp in 1999.

The documents from some Guantanamo captives, such as Abbas Habid Rumi Al Naely, state that the Khalden training camp was also located in Darunta.

== Administration ==
Some sources claim the director of the camp was Midhat Mursi.

=== Dispute over whether Darunta was an al Qaeda camp ===
During his Administrative Review Board Abdul Bin Mohammed Bin Abess Ourgy acknowledged attending the Darunta camp, but he disputed that it was affiliated with al-Qaeda. He asserted that the Derunta camp was a non-al Qaeda camp, that dated back to the Soviet occupation of Afghanistan, that it was originally run by the Hezbi Islami, and that after his attendance there the Derunta camp was one of the many non-al Qaeda camps that the Taliban shut down at al Qaeda's request.

Other Guantanamo captives have reported that the similarly well-known Khalden training camp was not an al-Qaeda camp, and was shut down in 2000, at Osama bin Laden's request.

== Alleged attendees ==
Individuals alleged to have attended the Derunta camp
Nabil Aukal	Attended in 1997 with four other members of Hamas
Moazzam Begg	Alleged by DoD officials to have attended in 1998.; Leaked files reveal that the DoD had secretly concluded Begg had been an instructor at Derunta.
Menad Benchellali	Alleged to be a "chemical weapons" specialist
Abdul Haddi Bin Hadiddi	The detainee reportedly received military training on the use of light arms in the Darunta Camp in Jalalabad, Afghanistan.
Riyad Bil Mohammed Tahir Nasseri	Alleged to have attended both Khalden and Darunta.
Ahmed Ressam	The "millennium bomber"; admitted that he trained how to manufacture advanced explosives and make electronic circuits for six weeks at the camp.
Hisham Sliti	Alleged to have attended both the Khalden training camp and Derunta.
Saed Khatem Al Malki	During his Administrative Review Board Saed Khatem Al Malki faced the allegations a: The detainee may have been involved in a November 1995 bomb attack on the Egyptian Embassy in Islamabad. He then escaped to the Shamshad and Deruntah camps in Afghanistan the day of the attack.; The Deruntah training camp has a poisons course that lasts approximately two weeks and teaches students how to poison food and drinks.
Abdul Bin Mohammed Bin Abess Ourgy	During both his Combatant Status Review Tribunal and Administrative Review Board Abdul Bin Mohammed Bin Abess Ourgy faced the allegations: The Detainee is a Tunisian national who traveled to Italy then to Afghanistan where he received training at the Derunta military camp.; Derunta is an Al-Qaida military training camp.; The Detainee spent 28 days at the camp where he participated in Kalashnikov rifle, pistol, RPG, and grenade training.
Hisham Sliti	Hisham Sliti faced the allegation: "The detainee received training on the use of light arms at the Khaldan Camp near the Khowst Province, and the Derunta Camp in Jalalabad".
Abdul Haddi Bin Hadiddi	Abdul Haddi Bin Hadiddi faced the allegation: "The detainee reportedly received military training on the use of light arms in the Derunta Camp in Jalalabad, Afghanistan."
Riyad Bil Mohammed Tahir Nasseri	Riyad Bil Mohammed Tahir Nasseri faced the following allegations during his Administrative Review Board: The detainee received military training at the Derunta camp in Jalalabad, Afghanistan and Khaldan camp near Khowst, Afghanistan.; The detainee received training on light arms while at the camps.; Derunta was one of Usama bin Laden's most important bases in Afghanistan. The camp provided training in the use of explosives and toxic chemical usage. Derunta also contained several secondary bases belonging to Usama bin Laden.
Sada Jan	Sada Jan was asked about the Derunta camp, during his Combatant Status Review Tribunal, even though it was not listed in the allegations on his Summary of Evidence memo.
