= Darunta Dam =

Dam in Nangarhar, Afghanistan

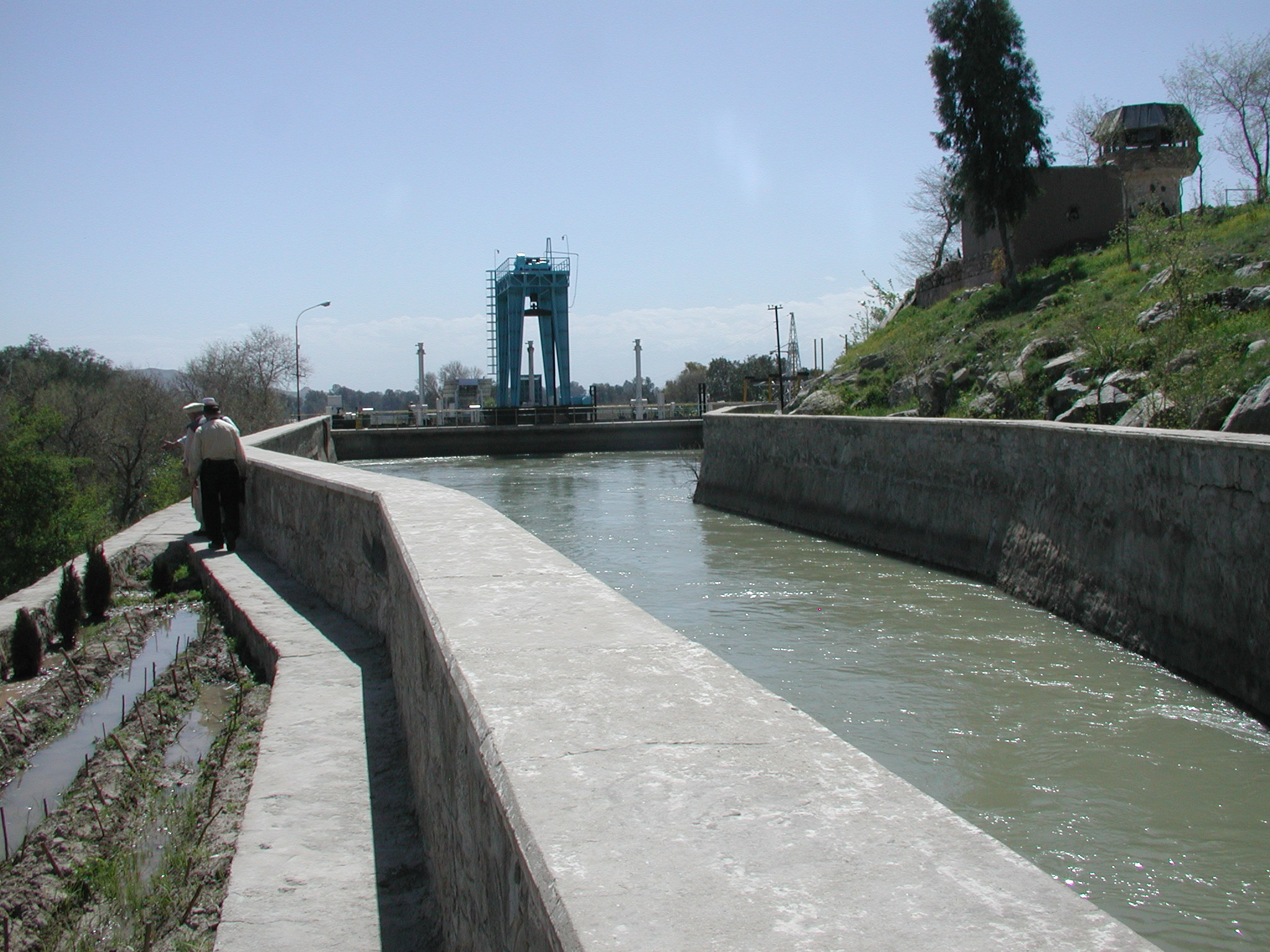
- The Darunta power plant in 2005
- Interactive map of Darunta Dam
- Country: Afghanistan
- Location: Jalalabad, Nangarhar Province
- Coordinates: 34°29′5″N 70°21′48″E
- Purpose: Irrigation and electricity
- Status: Operational
- Opening date: 1964
- Owner: Afghan Ministry of Energy and Water

Dam and spillways
- Impounds: Kabul River

Power Station
- Operators: Ministry of Energy and Water

The Darunta Dam (Pashto: درونټه برېښناکوټ) is located on the Kabul River near the village of Darunta, approximately 7 km (4.3 mi) west of Jalalabad, the capital of Nangarhar Province in eastern Afghanistan. It is owned and operated by the country's Ministry of Energy and Water. The dam's hydroelectric power station is being rehabilitated at a cost of $10.5 million.

== History ==
Darunta Dam was built in the early 1960s under the supervision of engineers from the Soviet Union. Its power station contains three vertical Kaplan turbines (six-blade propeller) with a rated output of 3.85 megawatts (5,160 hp) each. Originally, the dam supplied 40 to 45 megawatts (54,000 to 60,000 hp) of electrical power but silting and damage to the system during the decades of war has reduced its actual output to 11.5 megawatts (15,400 hp).

In 2011, an American company by the name of ANHAM was contracted by USAID to perform the initial rehabilitation of the Darunta power plant. Later, the USAID abandoned the repair work due to Gul Agha Sherzai not paying 10% of the project's $11 million total cost. Sherzai was Nangarhar's governor at the time.

== See also ==
- List of dams and reservoirs in Afghanistan
