= Kama District =

District in Nangarhar Province, Afghanistan

Coordinates: 34°24′45″N 70°38′20″E

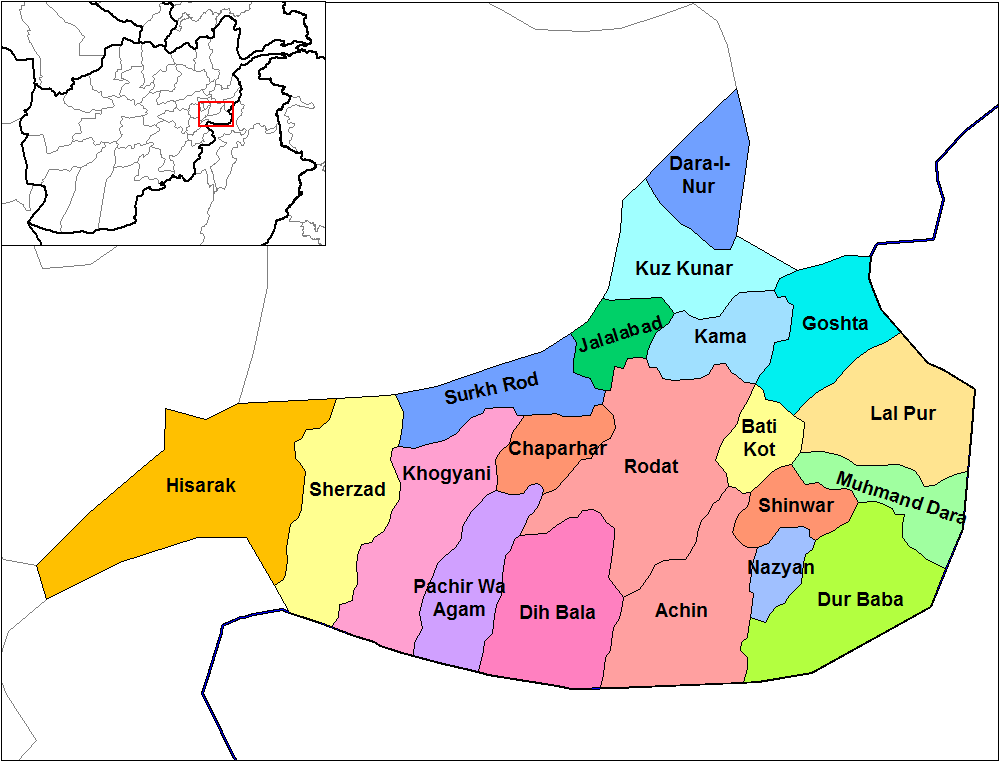
Nangarhar districts.

Kama (Pashto: کامه) is a district in Nangarhar Province, Afghanistan, to the east of Jalalabad. Its population, which is 100% Pashtun, was estimated at 180,000 in 2012. The district is within the heartland of the Mohmand tribe of Pashtuns. The district centre is the village of Sanger Srye Kama. The districts includes most of the Kama Valley.

== History ==
On February 2, 1980, Soviet forces attacked mujahideen fighters with helicopters.

== Health ==
In 2008, The Provincial Reconstruction Team in Nangarhar province built a hospital in Kama district. This hospital will serve to the neighboring districts as well as possible. Moreover, Kama district has a number of Basic Health Clinics (BHCs), which provide services to the residents.

== Sports ==
Beside other local sports, cricket is a popular sport in the district. In 2012, it was announced that a new cricket stadium was being built.

== Media ==
Kama district is in a location that can receive the transmission of local televisions and radios from Jalalabad city. On June 15, 2013, a private FM radio Qalam which means pen in Pashto language was launched in Kama district. Qalam radio has 8-hour educational, social and entertainment programs in 24 hours and it could be heard by neighboring districts as well.
