= Nangarhar Province =

Province of Afghanistan

Nangarhar د ننګرهار ولايت (Pashto) ولایت ننگرهار (Dari)
- Province
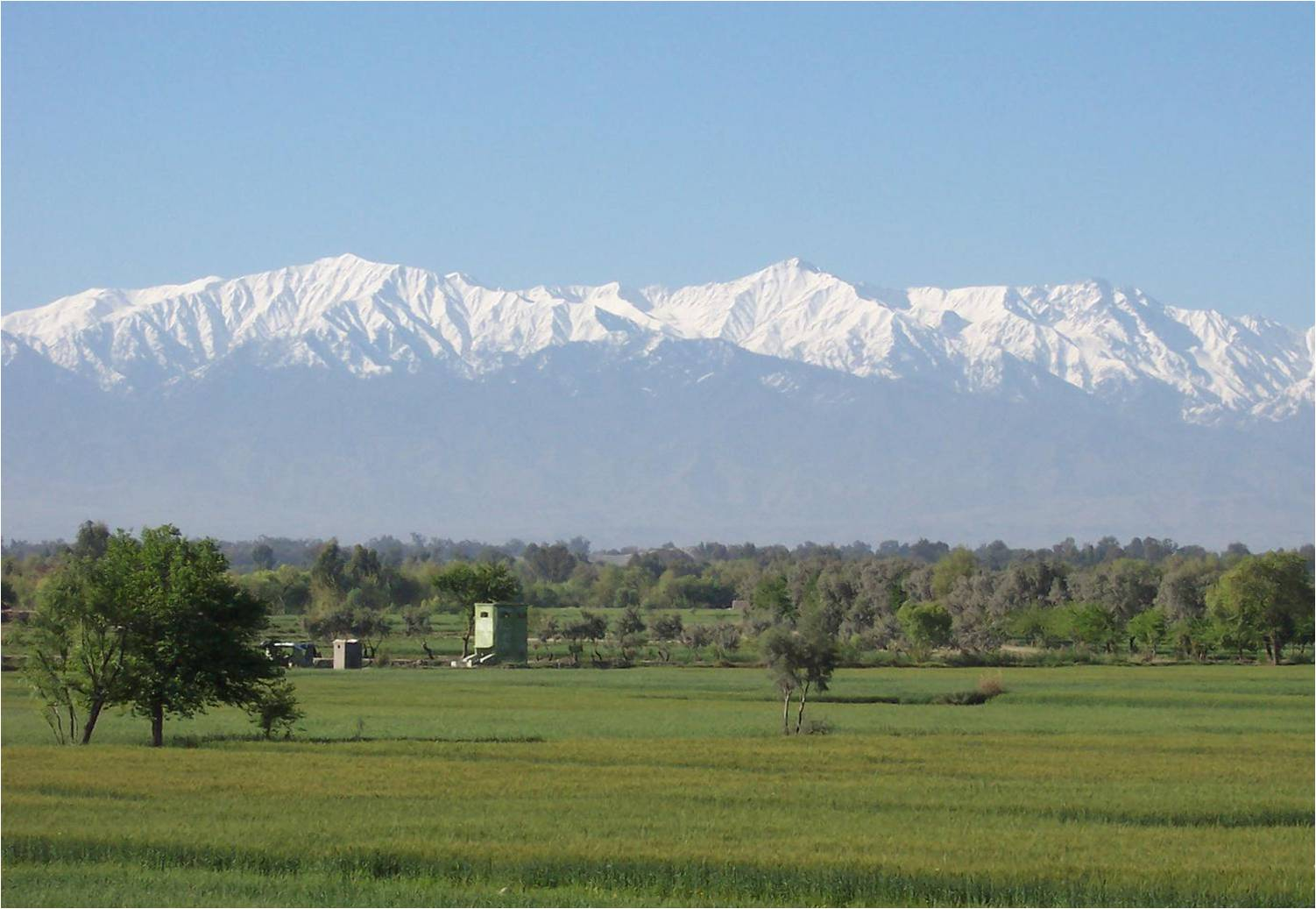
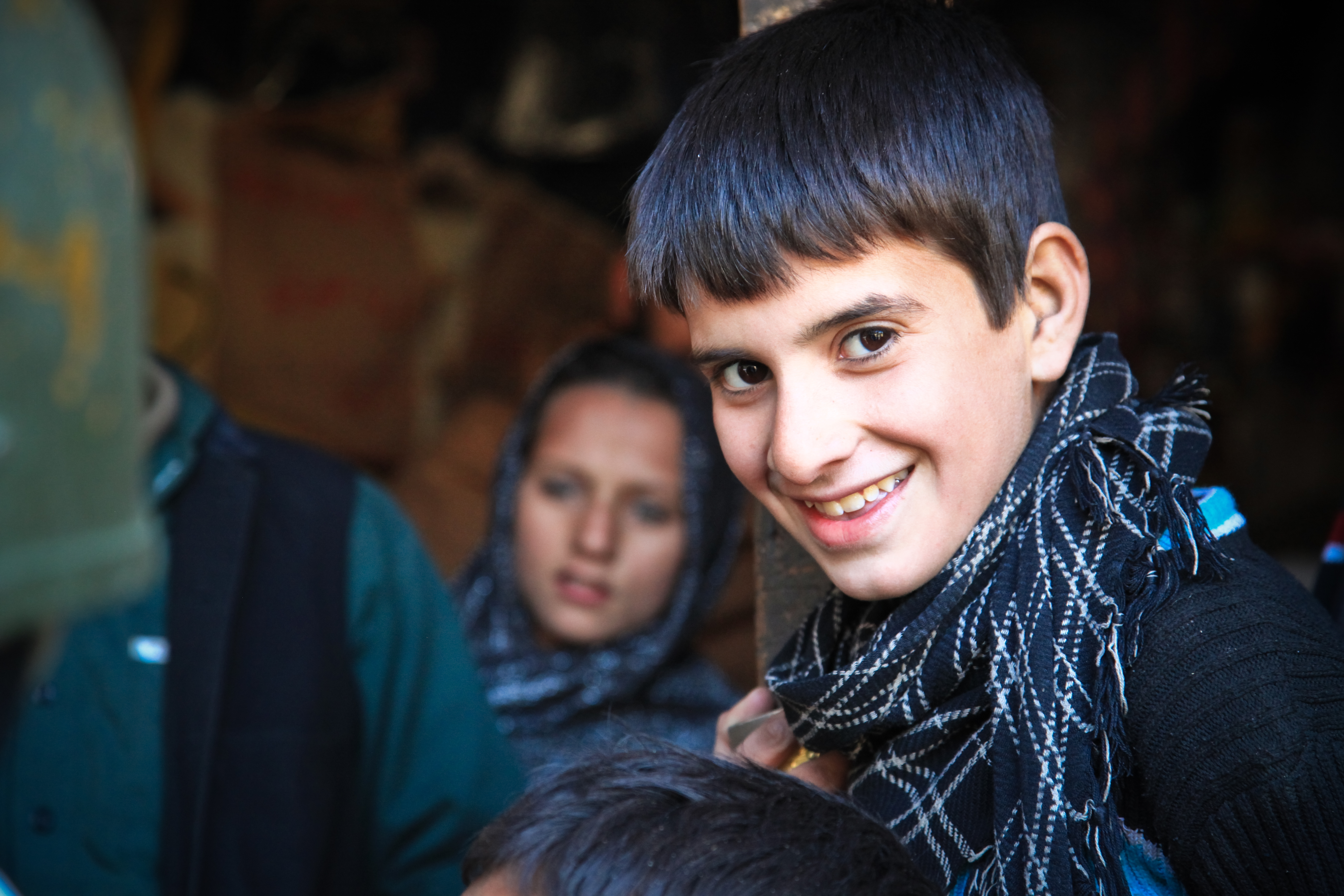
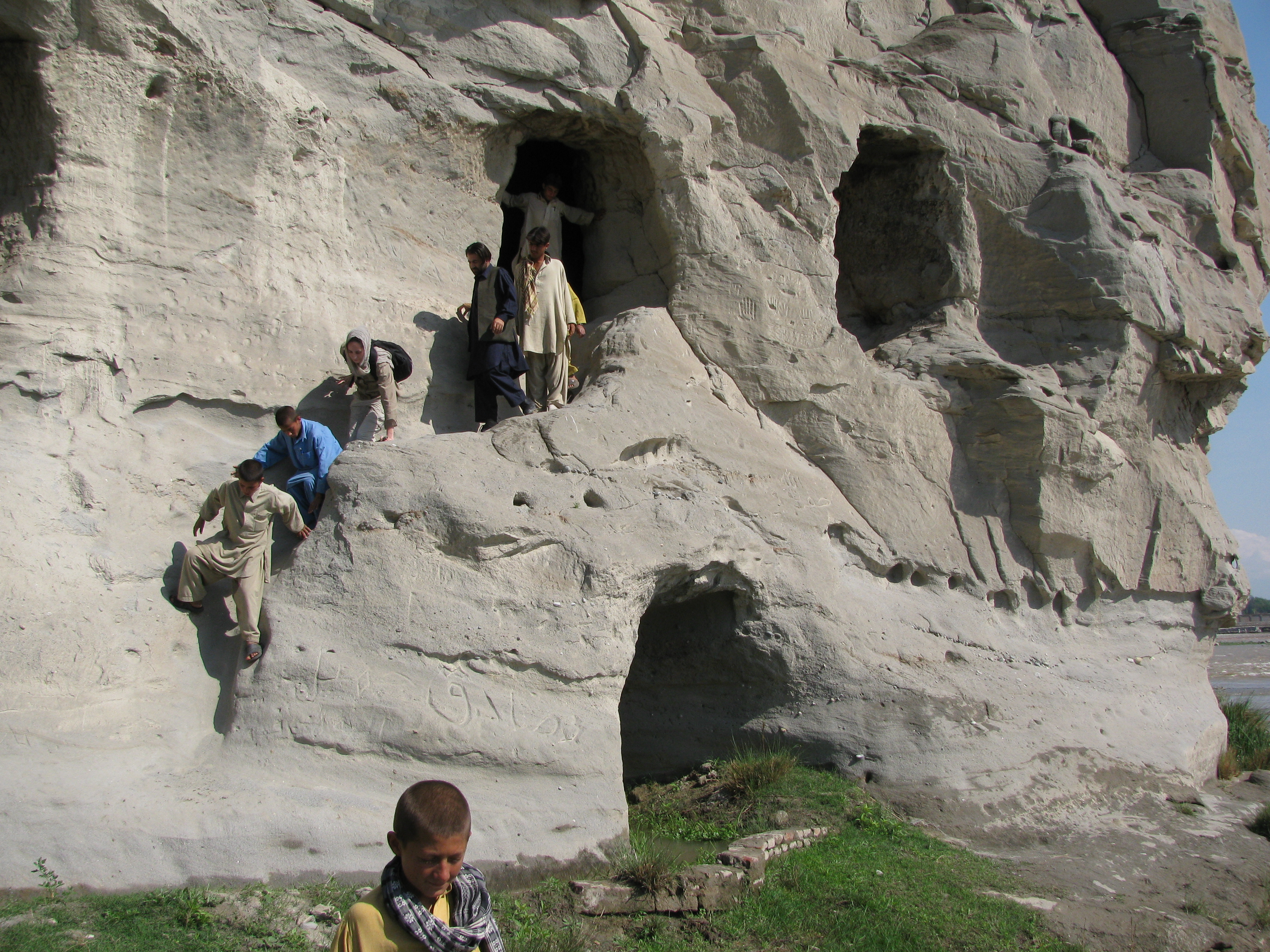
- From the top, Spin Ghar, Darunta Caves, a Nangarhari boy

- Map of Afghanistan with Nangarhar highlighted
- Coordinates (Capital): 34.25°N 70.50°E
- Country: Afghanistan
- Capital: Jalalabad

Government
  - Governor: Haji Gul Mohammad Barich

Area
  - Total: 7,727 km^{2} (2,983 sq mi)

Population (2023)
  - Total: c. 1.8 million
  - Density: 232.9/km^{2} (603/sq mi)
- Demonym: Nangarhari
- Time zone: UTC+4:30 (Afghanistan Time)
- Postal code: 38xx
- Area code: AF-NAN
- Main languages: Pashto, Dari

Nangarhar (also spelled Nangrahar, Ningrahar, and Ningarhar, Pashto: د ننګرهار ولایت, romanized: Da Nangarhār Wilāyat and Dari: ولایت ننگرهار, romanized: Wilāyat-e Nangarhār) is an eastern provinces of Afghanistan which serves as an important economic and cultural gateway between Afghanistan and Pakistan. It borders Pakistan's Khyber Pakhtunkhwa province to the east and south, while internally it is adjacent to the Afghan provinces of Kunar, Laghman, Kabul, and Logar. The provincial capital is Jalalabad, a lowland city located along the Kabul River.

Covering an area of approximately 7,700 square kilometers and hosting an estimated population of around 1.8 million people (as of 2023), Nangarhar has fertile river valleys, semi-arid plains, and the lower reaches of the Spin Ghar mountain range, which forms the natural frontier with Pakistan. Its landscape is shaped by the Kabul, Kunar, and Surkh Rod rivers, which support agriculture and sustain densely populated rural districts.

Historically, Nangarhar has been an important crossroads linking Central Asia, South Asia, and the Iranian Plateau. It has served as a strategic corridor since antiquity along ancient routes connecting Kabul with Peshawar. Jalalabad and its surroundings have been part of various dynasties, including the Timurids, Mughals, and the early Afghan state under the Durrani Empire. The province is also home to the ancient Buddhist complex of Hadda, which flourished as a center of Greco-Buddhist art and learning. In the modern era, its proximity to the border, tribal landscape, and transit routes have shaped its environment.

== Etymology ==
The name Nangarhar is derived from the ancient Sanskrit term Nagarahara (Sanskrit: नगर, romanized: nagara), which appears in early Brahmi sources of Gandhara. The word nagara means settlement, city, or populated place, while har or ghar is a toponym, meaning 'land' or 'territory', hence the name means of 'land of settlements' or 'inhabited region'.

== History ==
=== Antiquity ===
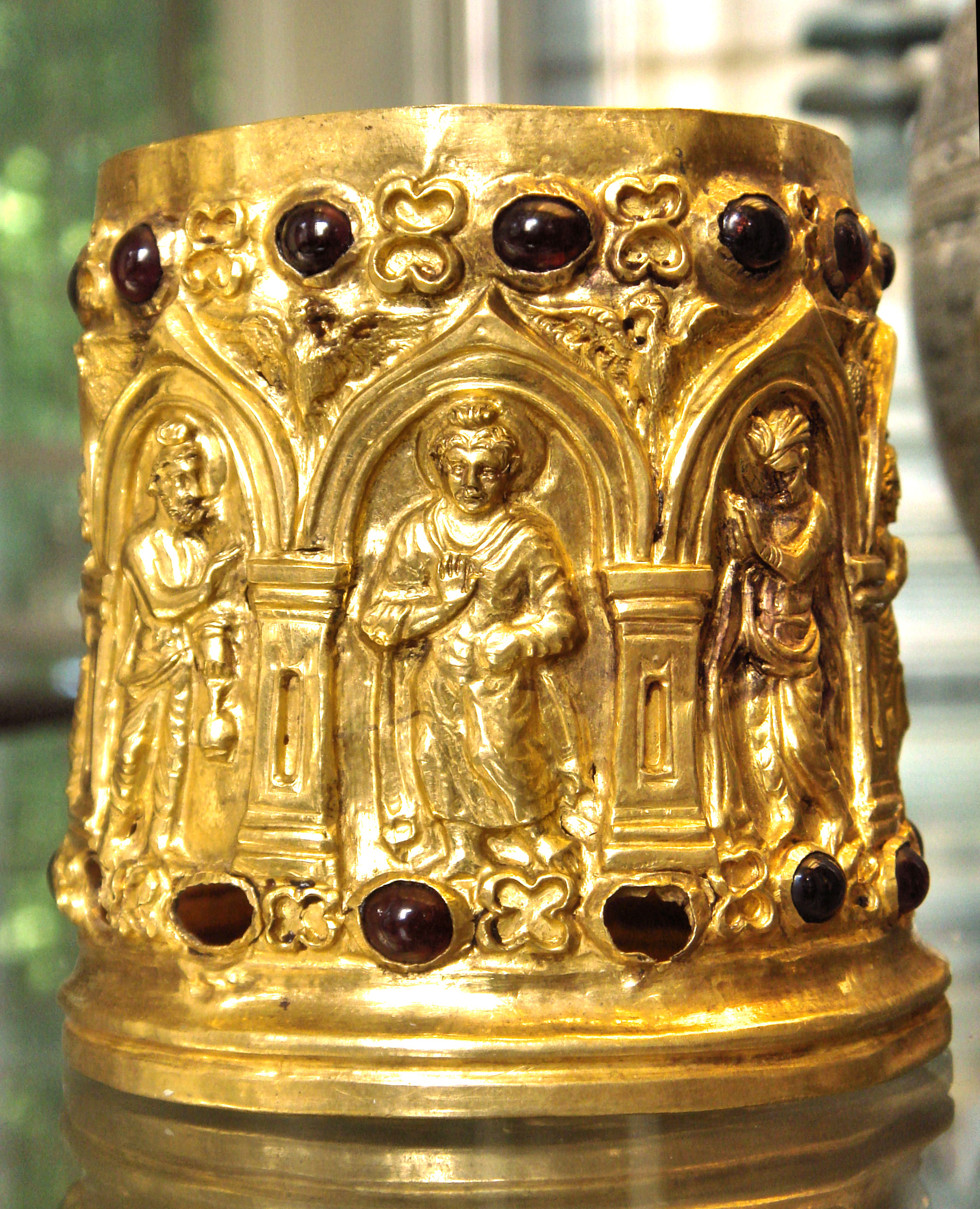
The Bimaran casket is a small gold reliquary for Buddhist relics from around the 1st century CE that was removed at Bimaran, near Jalalabad in eastern Afghanistan

Nangarhar was an integral part of the ancient Gandhara civilization. Archaeological sites such as Hadda, Bara, and Begram show early urban settlements with Buddhist monasteries and stupas dating back to at least the 1st millennium BCE. The fertile river valleys and position along trade routes connecting the Kabul Valley with the Peshawar Valley and Indus facilitated trade and the spread of Buddhism.

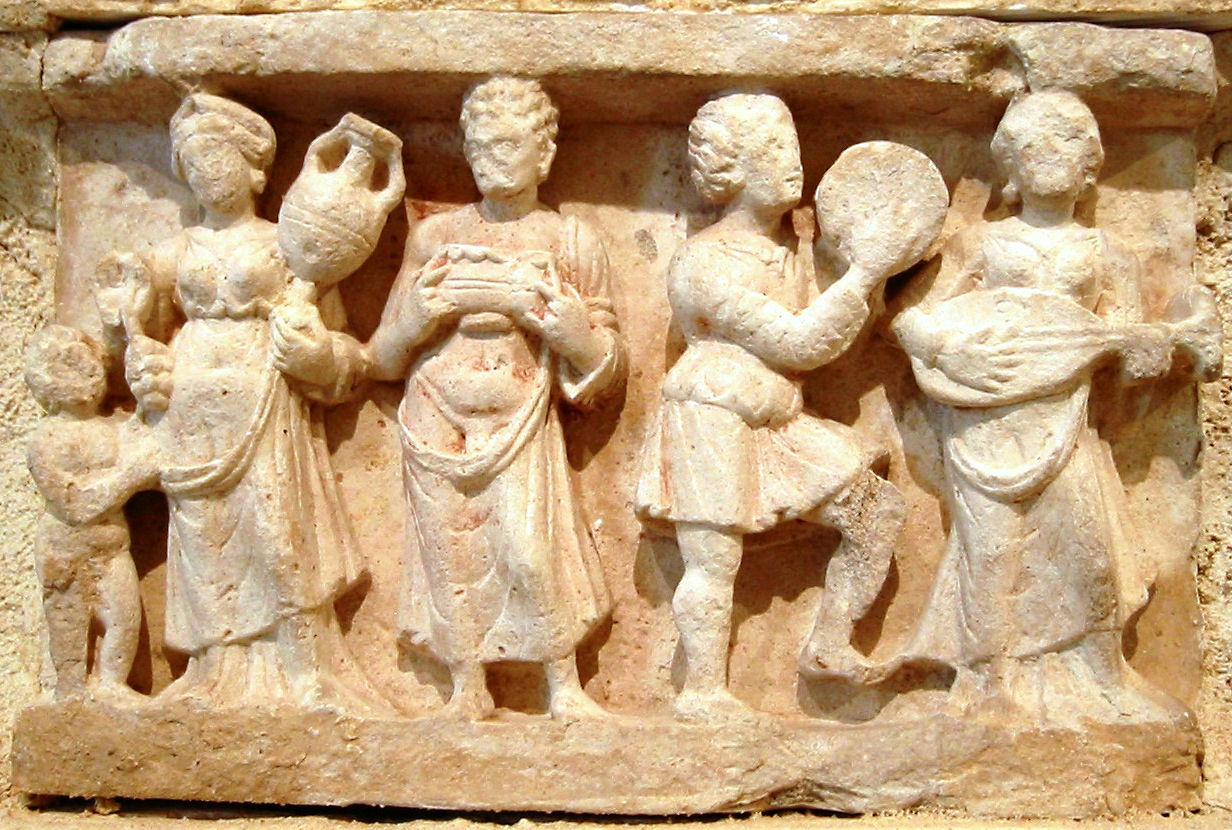
Relief sculpture from the archaeological site of Hadda around the 2nd century CE

During the Achaemenid period, it formed part of the Gandāra satrapy. Following the conquest by Alexander the Great, Hellenistic influence spread, as evidenced by coins and inscriptions. The region fell under Seleucid and later Mauryan control, promoting Buddhist institutions and integration into the broader South Asian cultural sphere. Inscriptions in Greek, Aramaic, Sanskrit, and Brahmi show the multicultural character of Nangarhar.

=== Medieval ===
During the early medieval era, Nangarhar came under successive Islamic dynasties, including the Ghaznavids and Ghurids. Its cities, especially Jalalabad, served as commercial and administrative hubs connecting the Indian subcontinent with Central Asia. The Mongol invasions of the 13th century under Genghis Khan caused devastation, destroying settlements and displacing populations. Under the Timurid Empire, its cities were rebuilt, fortifications strengthened, and trade networks reestablished.

=== Early modern ===
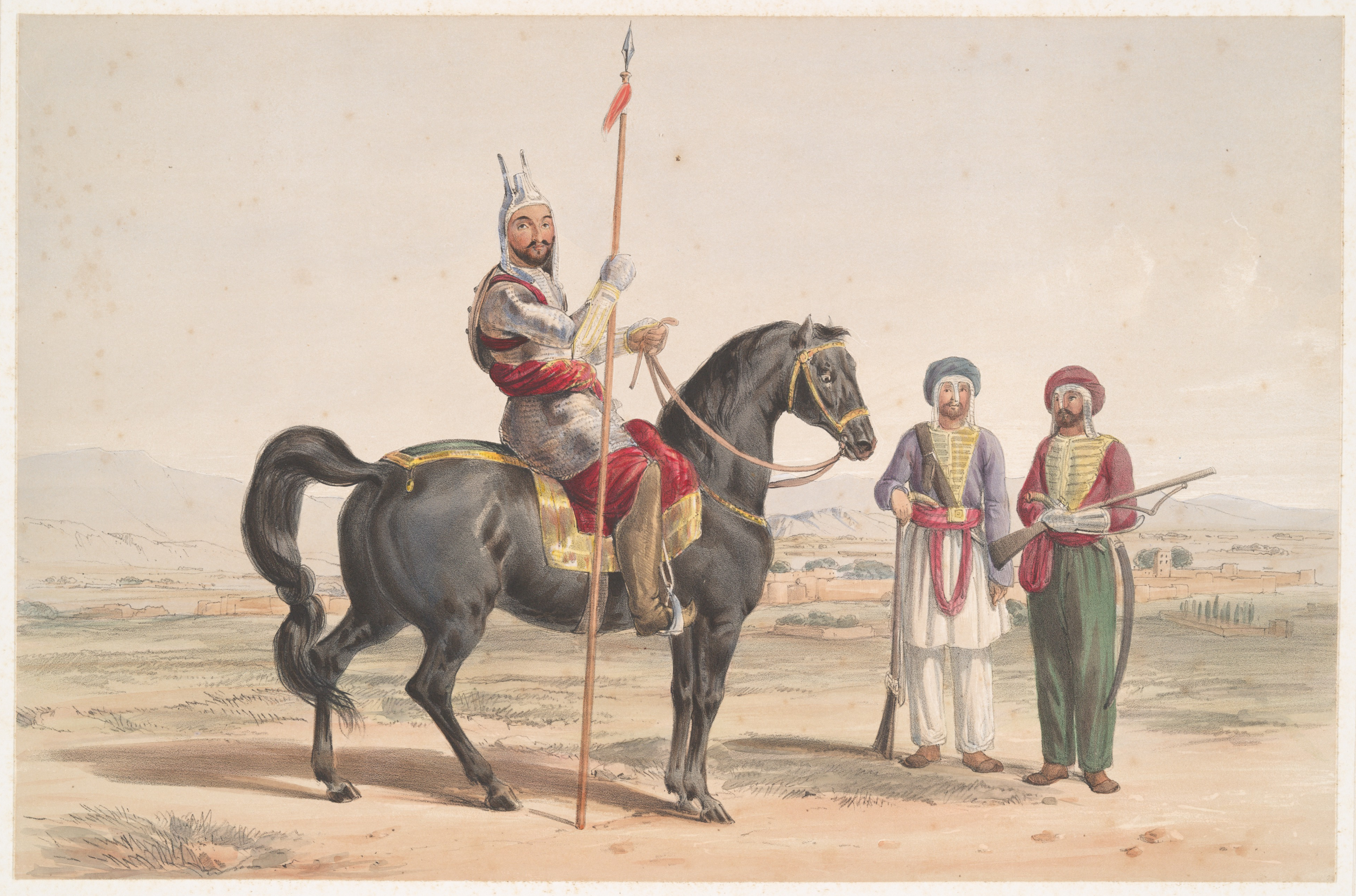
Wazir Akbar Khan during the Battle of Jalalabad in 1842

From the 16th century onward, Nangarhar was a part of the Mughal Empire.

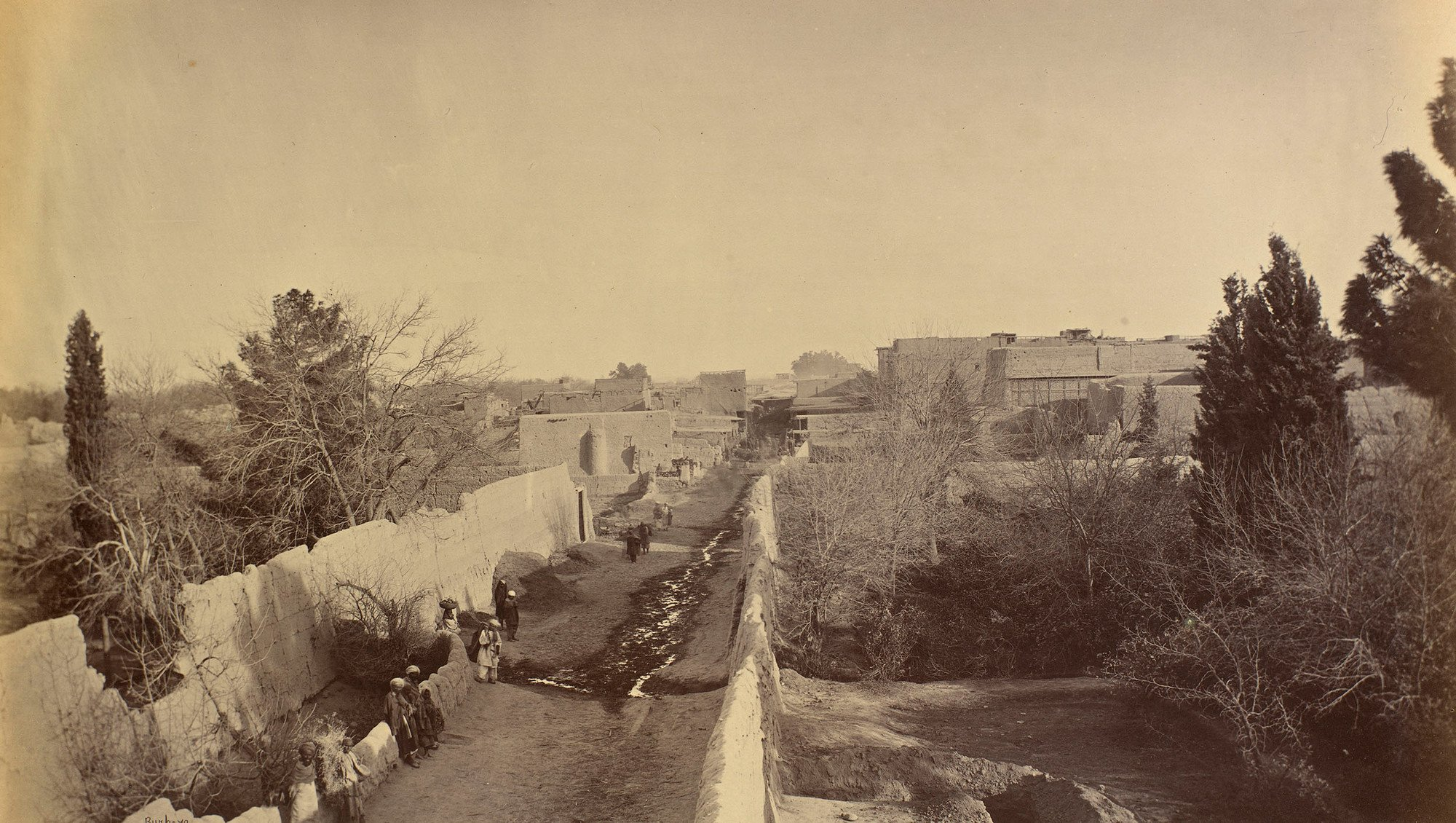
A village in Jalalabad in 1879

Nangarhar later became part of the Durrani Empire under Ahmad Shah Durrani in 1748. Its strategic location also made it a site of battles during the First Anglo-Afghan War (1839–1842) and the Second Anglo-Afghan War (1878–1880), when British forces briefly occupied parts of eastern Afghanistan.

=== Modern ===
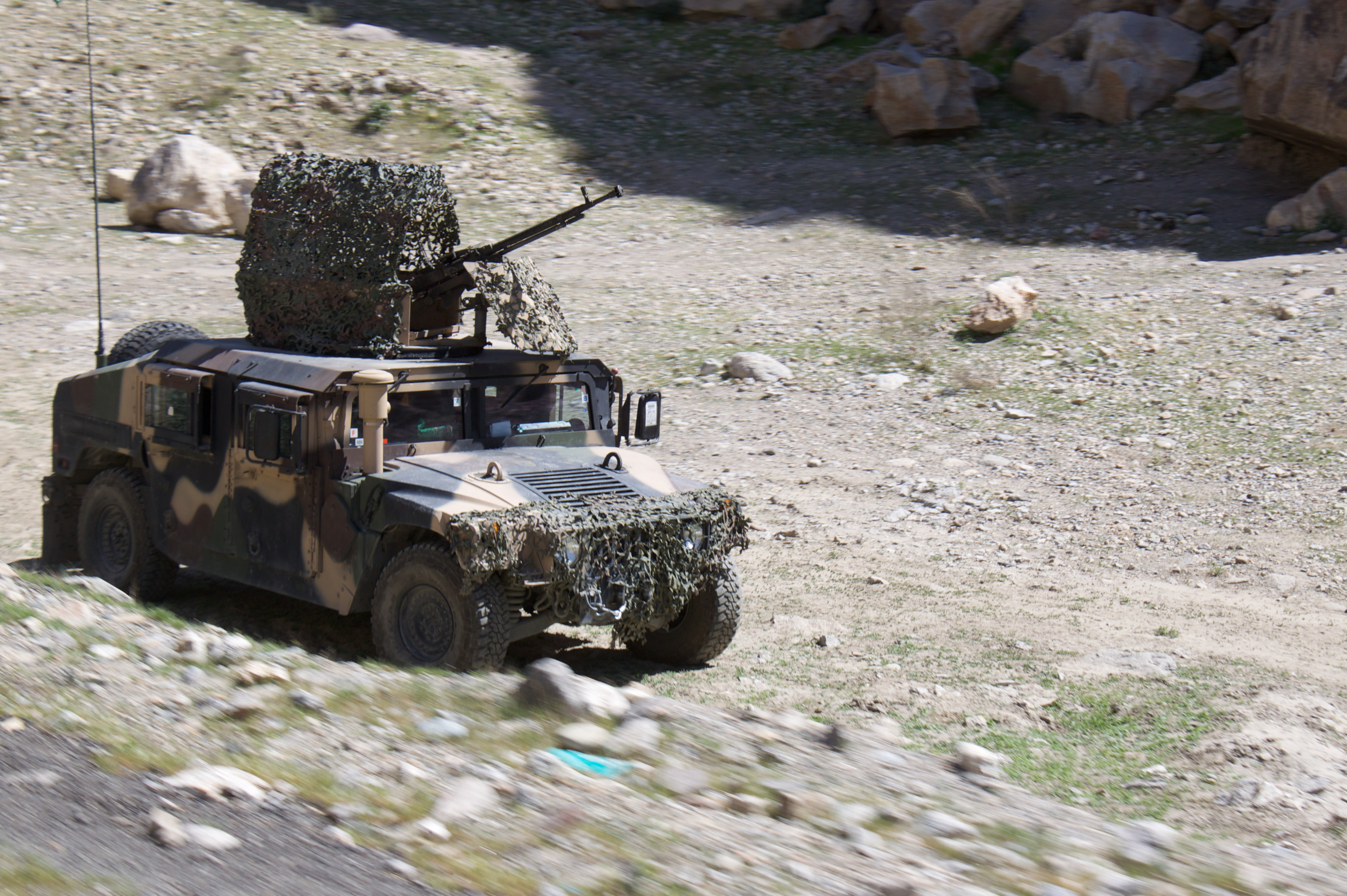
An Afghan Humvee next to the Kabul–Jalalabad Road (2010)

The Soviet invasion of Afghanistan in 1979 triggered decades of conflict in Nangarhar. The province became a stronghold for mujahideen, with its mountains and valleys like in Tora Bora providing natural defense and access to supply routes from Pakistan. Multiple local commanders, including influential tribal leaders, organized resistance against Soviet and later Afghan communist forces. After the Soviet withdrawal in 1989, Nangarhar was controlled by competing warlords and local militias. The province was strategically important for both Taliban and al-Qaeda networks during the 1990s due to its border with Pakistan and the Khyber Pass. Various insurgent bases and training camps were established in the region, making it a focal point of military and intelligence operations.

Following the United States invasion of Afghanistan in 2001, Nangarhar was among the first provinces to experience coalition military operations. U.S. and allied forces targeted insurgent networks while working to rebuild infrastructure and establish local governance. Nevertheless, insurgent activity persisted, and the province remained contested throughout the 2000s and 2010s.

=== Present ===
In August 2021, as part of the U.S. withdrawal from Afghanistan, the Taliban advanced rapidly across eastern Afghanistan and captured Jalalabad along with surrounding districts. With the fall of Nangarhar, the Taliban gained control over key transport routes linking Afghanistan to Pakistan, including roads towards the Khyber Pass. Since returning to power, the Taliban have issued multiple edicts imposing severe restrictions on women and girls, including bans on secondary education beyond a certain grade, limitations on employment, travel, and public life, and strict dress and guardianship rules. Consequently, Nangarhar remains under Taliban control while continuing to occupy a strategic and economic position, owing to its fertile valleys, historic trade routes, and geographic proximity to the border with Pakistan and the Khyber Pass, thus preserving its long‑standing role as a cultural and geographic crossroads of eastern Afghanistan.

== Geography ==
=== Landscape ===
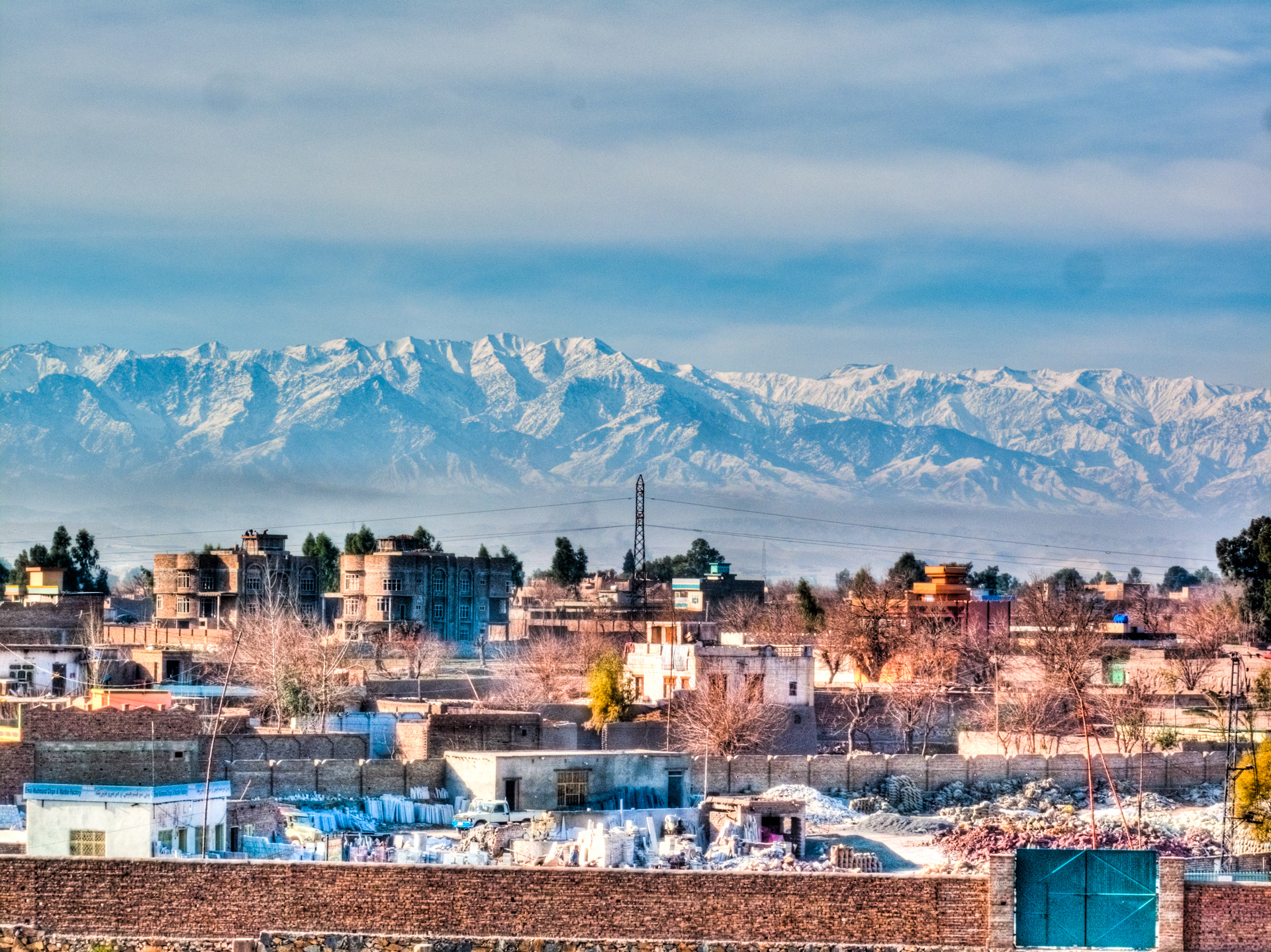
View on the Spin Ghar from Jalalabad

Nangarhar is located in eastern Afghanistan and shares borders with Kunar and Laghman to the north, the Khyber Pakhtunkhwa region of Pakistan to the east and south, and Paktia to the west. The province covers a mixture of fertile river valleys, arid plains, and mountainous terrain. The most prominent valley is the one near Jalalabad, through which the Kabul River flows, supporting the majority of agricultural production and human settlement. Smaller valleys branch from the main river basin, providing additional arable land and linking the mountainous areas to the plains.

The mountains in the province are primarily extensions of the Hindu Kush and Spin Ghar ranges, forming natural barriers along the border with Pakistan. These mountains include peaks reaching over 3,000 m and are interspersed with lower hills and rocky outcrops, which create natural districts and influence settlement patterns. The region's terrain has historically shaped trade routes and military movements due to the strategic passes and rugged corridors.

=== Flora and fauna ===
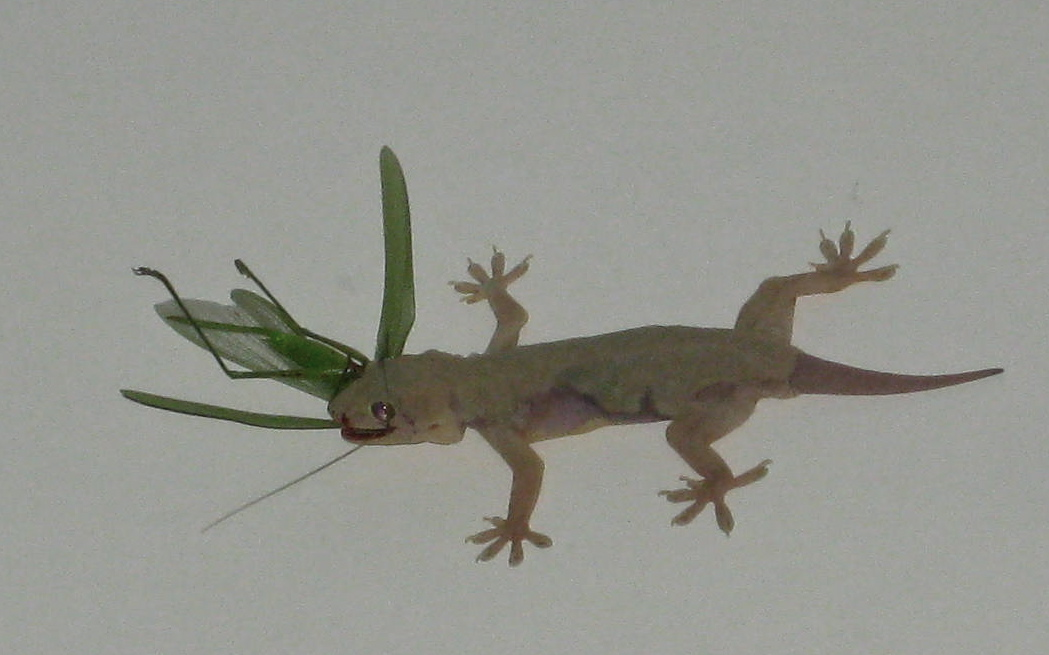
Geckos are widely found in Nangarhar

Nangarhar's vegetation varies from fertile riverine lands to arid plains and rocky mountain slopes. In the Jalalabad valley and along irrigated riverbanks, crops such as wheat, rice, pomegranate, grapes, and vegetables are cultivated extensively. Orchards and gardens flourish in irrigated zones, supporting local diets and commerce. Semi-arid and mountainous areas are covered by shrubs, grasses, and scattered trees like acacia and tamarisk. Wildlife includes foxes, jackals, wild goats, and various hare, amphibia, and lizard species, while birds such as partridges, doves, and migratory waterfowl inhabit rivers, wetlands, and cultivated fields. The diverse habitats created by valleys, rivers, and hills allow for localized biodiversity, though human activity and limited water resources affect the abundance of wildlife.

=== Climate ===
Nangarhar experiences a variety of climate types, with most areas classified as hot semi-arid climate (BSh) and hot desert climate (BWh), while smaller regions exhibit hot-summer Mediterranean (Csa), cold and warm humid continental climate (Dsa, Dsb), cold semi-arid climate (BSk), and warm-summer Mediterranean (Csb) climates. Summers in valleys often exceed 40 °C, while mountainous regions remain cooler. Winter temperatures in low-lying areas generally range from 5–15 °C. Annual rainfall is low, averaging 200–400 mm, mostly in winter and early spring, with seasonal snow in the highlands contributing to river flow and irrigation. Irrigation and river valleys create localized microclimates supporting agriculture. Nangarhar is also prone to floods and periodic droughts, which periodically affect agriculture and settlements.

== Government and politics ==
=== Local governance ===
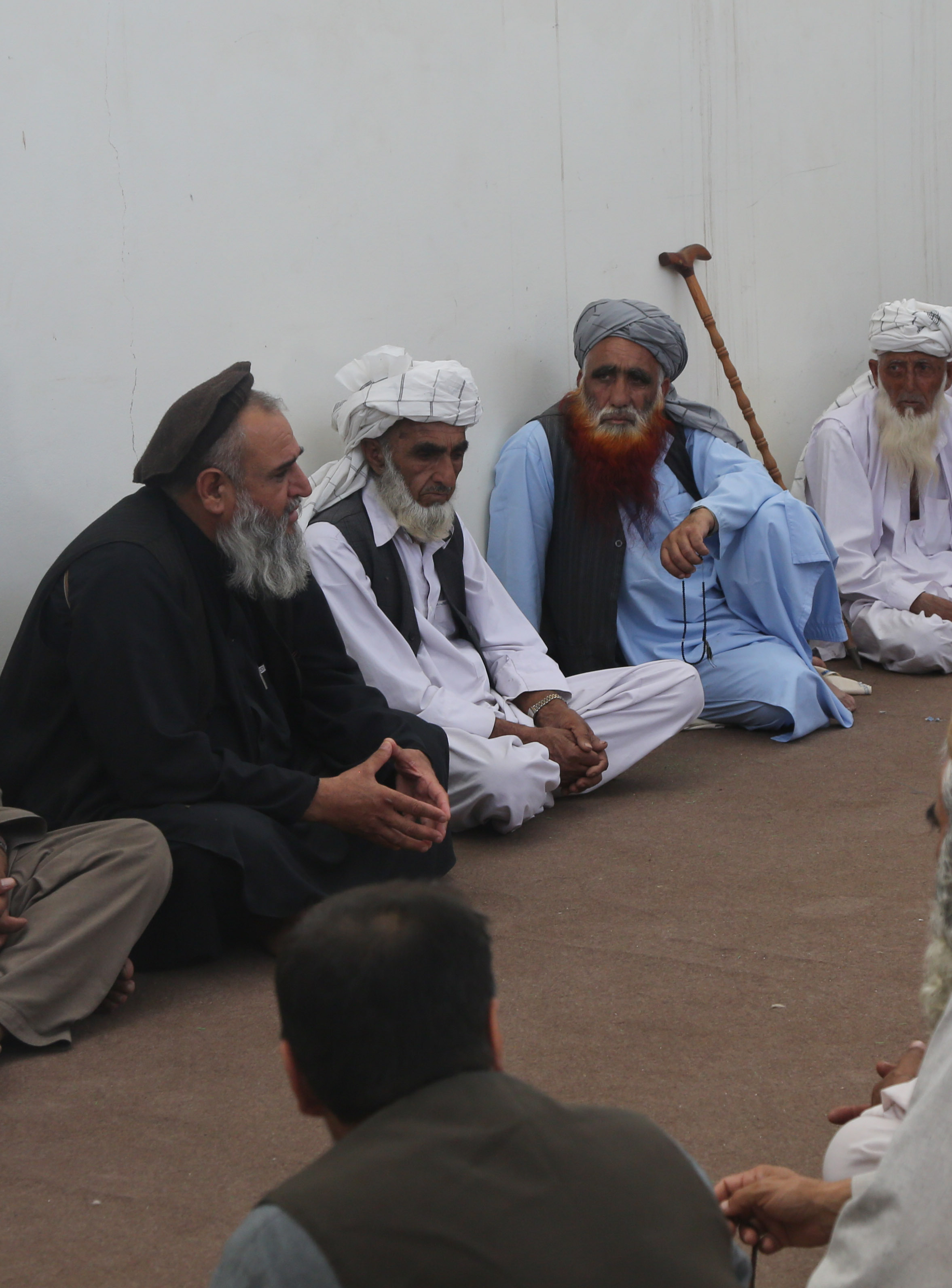
Local elders gather at a local police station during a traditional jirga at Hesarak, Nangarhar

Local governance in Nangarhar has historically been shaped by its position as eastern Afghanistan's primary gateway to Pakistan, its dense population, and the strong political influence of powerful Pashtun tribes such as the Shinwari, Mohmand, and Khogyani. Unlike many more remote provinces, Nangarhar has long been closely integrated into national trade, border administration, and security policy due to the strategic importance of the Khyber Pass and the Torkham border crossing.

Throughout the 20th century, governance in Nangarhar was nominally exercised through governors appointed by Kabul. However, in practice, local tribal khans, maliks and other informal authorities often held significant influence, and administration was shaped by Jalalabad's historical role as a trade and border city.

During the period following the Soviet withdrawal and throughout the Afghan civil wars, governance fragmented among mujahideen factions and tribal power holders, while parts of Achin, Kot, and Deh Bala intermittently fell outside effective provincial control. After 2001, the Islamic Republic re-established provincial institutions, but governance remained heavily affected by corruption, contested land ownership, drug trafficking routes, and the presence of militant groups including the Taliban and IS-K.

Since the Fall of Kabul, governance in Nangarhar has been fully integrated into the administrative system of the Islamic Emirate of Afghanistan. The governor and all district officials are appointed directly by Taliban leadership. Civil administration, courts, customs revenue at Torkham, and border enforcement are now managed under Taliban structures. Despite centralized control, informal influence by tribal elders, religious authorities, and cross-border commercial networks remains significant, especially in rural districts.

As of December 2025, the governor of Nangarhar is Haji Gul Mohammad Barich.

=== Administrative divisions ===
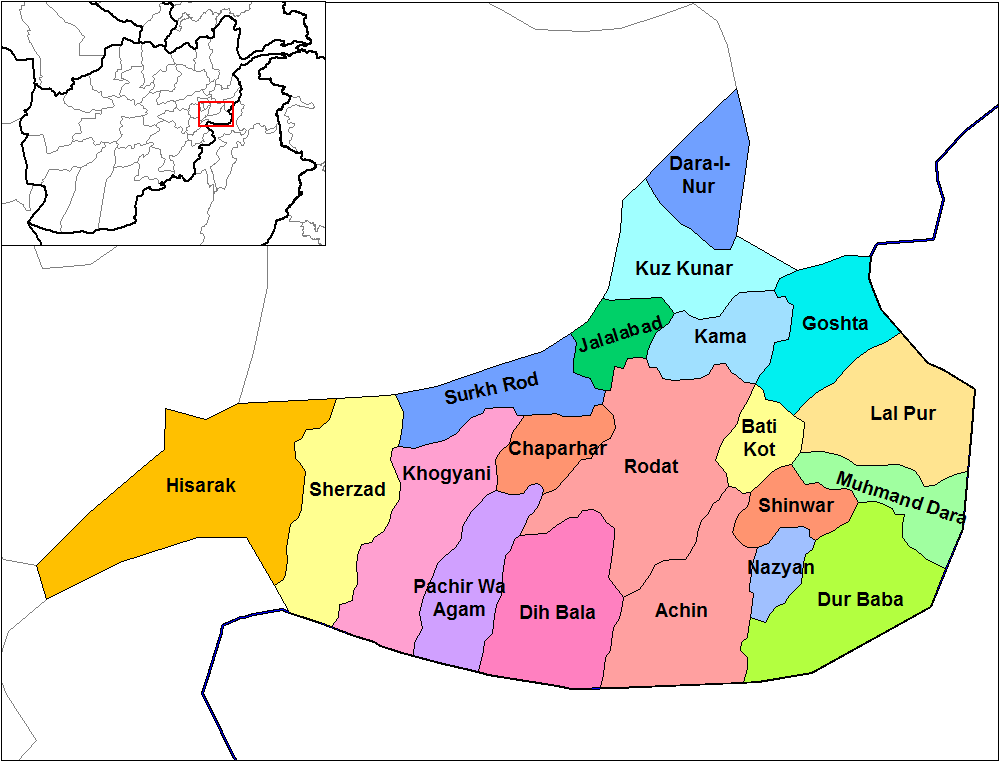
Map of the districts of Nangarhar as of January 2004, prior to the redrawing of provincial and district boundaries later that year

Nangarhar is divided into 22 districts, each led by a district chief responsible for local administration and coordination with the provincial government. The provincial capital, Jalalabad, serves as the political, economic, and administrative hub of the province. Other notable districts include Behsud, Hesarak, Achin, and Rodat.

Districts of Nangarhar Province
District	Capital	Population	Area	Pop. density	Notes
Jalalabad	Jalalabad	271,867	122	2,228	85% Pashtun, 9% Tajik, 6% Pashai and other.
Haska Meyna/Deh Bala	Haska Meyna	45,570	337	135	100% Pashtun.
Shinwar	Shinwar	67,758	133	508	100% Pashtun.
Achin	Achin	113,328	466	243	100% Pashtun. Includes the Spin Ghar District.
Bihsud	Bishud	128,474	265	485	95% Pashtun (55% Pashtun tribes, 40% Pashtunized Arab), 5% Tajik.Used to belong to Jalalabad District.
Chaparhar	Chaparhar	68,156	277	246	100% Pashtun.
Darai Nur	Darai Nur	45,571	253	180	99% Pashai, 1% Pashtun.
Bati Kot	Bati Kot	85,562	195	438	100% Pashtun.
Dur Baba	Dur Baba	26,306	302	87	100% Pashtun.
Goshta	Goshta	30,823	523	59	100% Pashtun.
Hisarak	Hisarak	34,809	620	56	100% Pashtun.
Kama	Kama	86,890	229	380	97% Pashtun, 1% Tajik, 2% other.
Khogyani	Kaga	147,745	789	187	100% Pashtun.
Kot	Kot	58,857	188	313	99% Pashtun, 1% Tajik. Created in 2005 within Rodat District
Kuz Kunar	Kuz Kunar	62,178	298	209	75% Pashtun, 25% Pashai and others.
Lal Pur	Lal Pur	23,117	475	49	100% Pashtun.
Momand Dara	Momand Dara	50,752	240	211	100% Pashtun.
Nazyan	Nayzan	16,607	188	88	100% Pashtun.
Pachir Aw Agam		48,095	516	93	100% Pashtun.
Rodat		78,121	272	287	100% Pashtun. Sub-divided in 2005
Sherzad		74,932	480	156	100% Pashtun.
Surkh Rod		136,180	312	437	88% Pashtun, 5% Hazara, 7% Pashai, Hindu and others.
Nangarhar		1,701,698	7,641	223	92.5% Pashtuns (89.5% Pashtun tribes, 3.0% Pashtunized Arabs), 4.8% Pashayi, 2.3% Hazaras, 0.3% Hindus, 0.1 Tajiks. (Note: Note: "Predominantely" or "dominated" is interpreted as 99%, "majority" as 70%, "mixed" as 1/(number of ethnicities), "minority" as 30% and "few" or "some" as 1%.)

=== Security ===
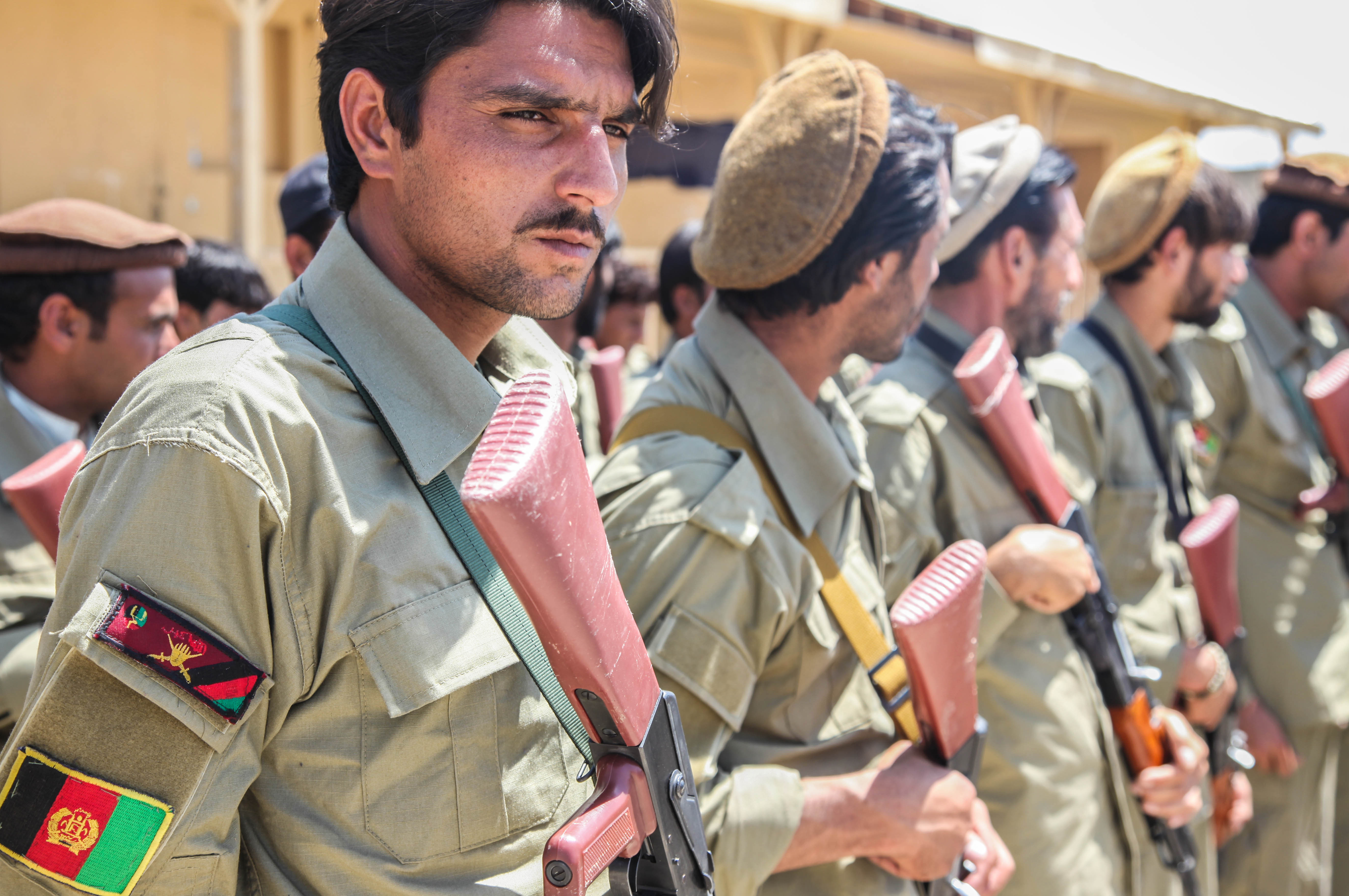
Members of an Afghan Local Police in Nangarhar (2013)

Nangarhar's security situation is heavily influenced by its strategic location along the Durand Line with Pakistan and by complex tribal dynamics. During the era of the Islamic Republic of Afghanistan, the province was a key site for counter‑insurgency operations by Afghan and international forces. Since the 2021 Taliban takeover, the province is formally under Taliban control, who maintain order particularly in urban centers such as Jalalabad, while many rural districts continue to experience sporadic insurgent activity, criminal networks, and localized conflict. Meanwhile, informal local power actors, such as tribal elders, religious leaders, and community councils, continue to play a role in mediating disputes and influencing local law enforcement and governance.

== Economy ==
Nangarhar is one of eastern Afghanistan's most economically significant provinces due to its fertile river valleys, direct access to Pakistan through the Torkham border crossing, and its role as a regional commercial hub centered on Jalalabad. The provincial economy is based on a combination of agriculture, cross-border trade, small-scale industry, and transport services, with strong economic linkages to the Pakistani economy.

=== Agriculture and animal husbandry ===
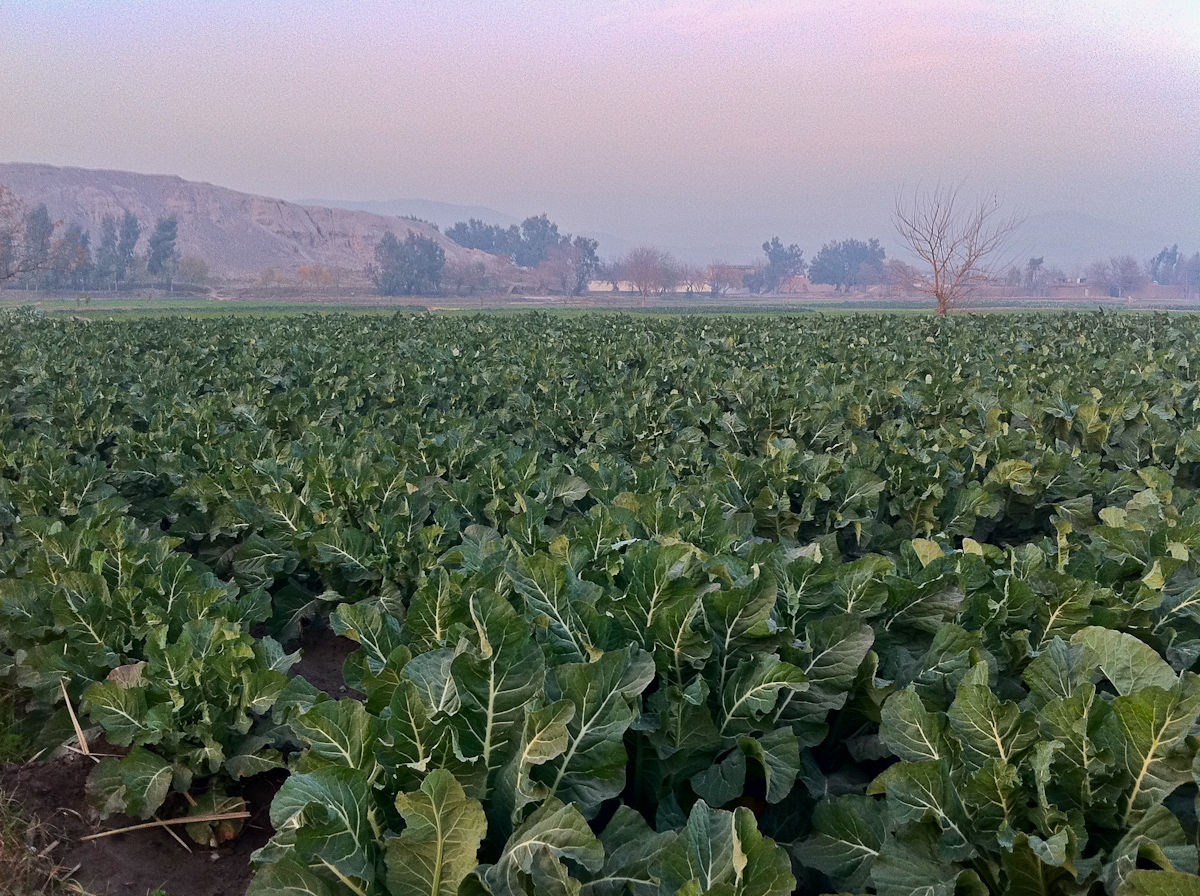
Agriculture is the main source of income in Nangarhar

Agriculture forms the backbone of Nangarhar's rural economy, particularly in the fertile valleys of the Kabul River and its tributaries. The province is one of Afghanistan's leading producers of barley, maize, rice, sugarcane, vegetables, and citrus fruits, especially lemons, oranges, olives, peanuts and dates from the Jalalabad area. Irrigated farming dominates in districts such as Surkh Rod, Behsud, Kama, and Kuz Kunar, while rain-fed cultivation is more common in mountainous districts such as Deh Bala and Pachir wa Agam. Nangarhar also plays an important role in Afghanistan's horticulture, with widespread production of pomegranates, olives, and almonds.

Livestock breeding in Nangarhar commonly includes cattle, sheep and goats, supplying both subsistence needs and markets. Until recently, parts of southern and mountainous Nangarhar were affected by opium‑poppy cultivation, but after a 2022 ban by the Taliban, poppy farming dropped sharply, and many farmers reportedly shifted toward legal crops.

=== Mining and industry ===
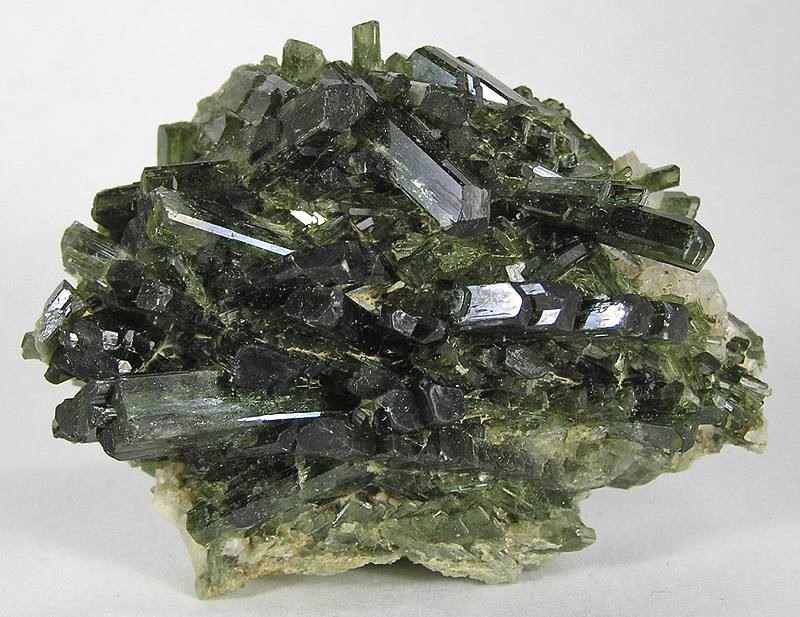
Diopside found in Khogyani

Nangarhar possesses a wide range of exploitable mineral resources, although most extraction remains small-scale or semi-industrial. The province is particularly known for deposits of jasper, gypsum, marble, limestone, coal, and nephrite, as well as various gemstones and rare-metal bearing pegmatite minerals, which include beryllium-, lithium-, tantalum-, and tourmaline-bearing formations. These mineral deposits are mainly concentrated in the mountainous districts of eastern and southern Nangarhar, especially in areas such as Achin, Deh Bala, and Pachir wa Agam. Marble and limestone extraction support the local construction industry and cross-border export to Pakistan. Talc and chromite have historically played an important role in regional mineral trade networks.

Industrial activity is concentrated around Jalalabad, where food processing, flour milling, edible oil production, brick kilns, plastic manufacturing, textile workshops, and beverage bottling facilities operate. The province also hosts one of Afghanistan's largest industrial zones, the Nangarhar Industrial Park, which accommodates dozens of medium-sized manufacturing and processing enterprises. However, unstable electricity supply, limited access to capital, and weak transport logistics continue to restrict large-scale industrial development.

=== Trade ===
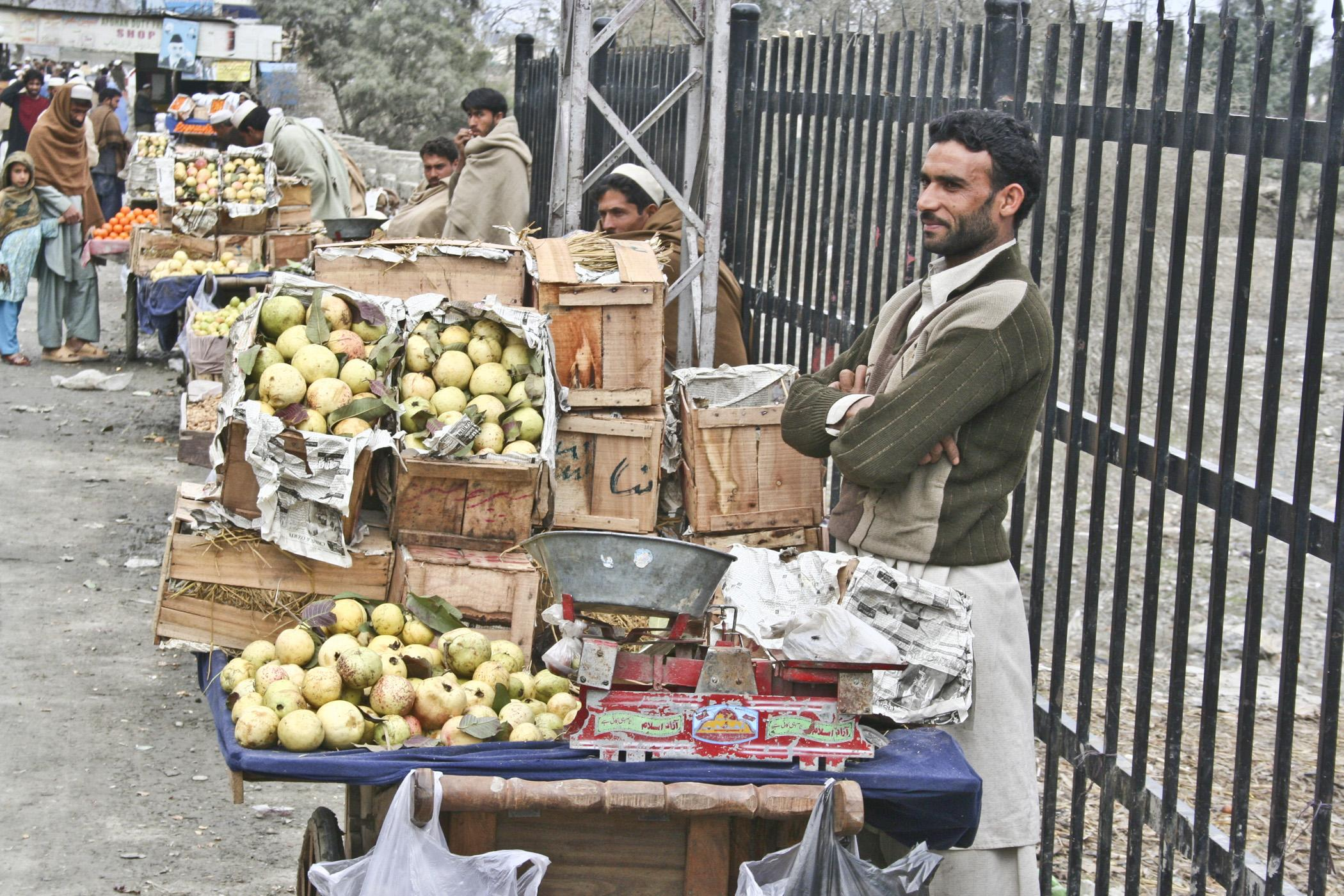
A local vendor selling fresh fruits at the Torkham border crossing

Trade is the most dynamic sector of Nangarhar's economy due to the strategic importance of the Torkham border crossing, which connects Afghanistan to Pakistan's Khyber Pakhtunkhwa. A significant share of Afghanistan's imports, including fuel, food products, construction materials, pharmaceutical drugs, and consumer goods, passes through Nangarhar. Jalalabad functions as a major wholesale and redistribution center for eastern and northeastern Afghanistan. Informal cross-border trade and smuggling have historically played a major economic role, particularly in fuel, electronics, and agricultural commodities. Customs revenue from Torkham represents one of the most important income sources for both provincial and central authorities under successive Afghan governments.

=== Energy and irrigation ===
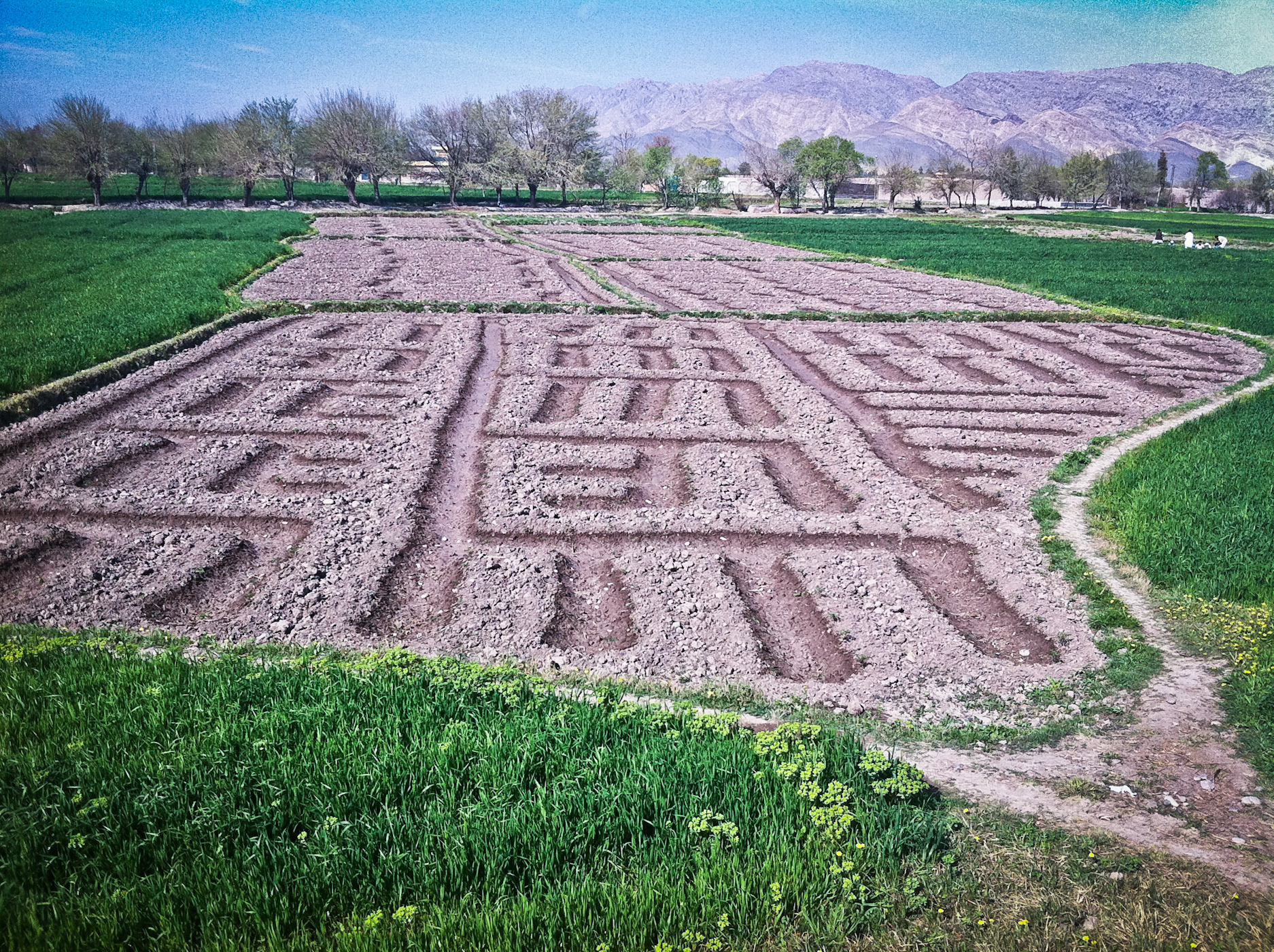
An irrigated field in Nangarhar

Nangarhar's irrigation system is primarily based on water from the Kabul River via the Darunta Dam, which provides irrigation water and hydroelectric power for Jalalabad and surrounding areas. The province historically supported up to 39,000 ha under formal irrigation schemes. In practice, however, electricity supply remains unreliable, as many households and businesses are dependent on generators or alternative means. It was especially reported when power from the dam proved insufficient. While canal networks distribute water to agricultural zones, recurring maintenance problems, siltation and drought or flood‑induced damage continue to challenge irrigation and agricultural productivity in rural districts.

=== Tourism ===
Nangarhar is often cited for its scenic valleys, mild winter climate and river landscapes around Jalalabad and the Darunta Dam. Historically, Jalalabad has long-served as a winter retreat for the Kabul elite. Domestic tourism, especially during holidays like Eid, has reportedly increased, with many Afghans visiting green areas, historical sites and mountainous districts such as Spin Ghar. However, international tourism remains minimal, and formal accommodation or tourism‑infrastructure is still largely underdeveloped.

=== Communication ===
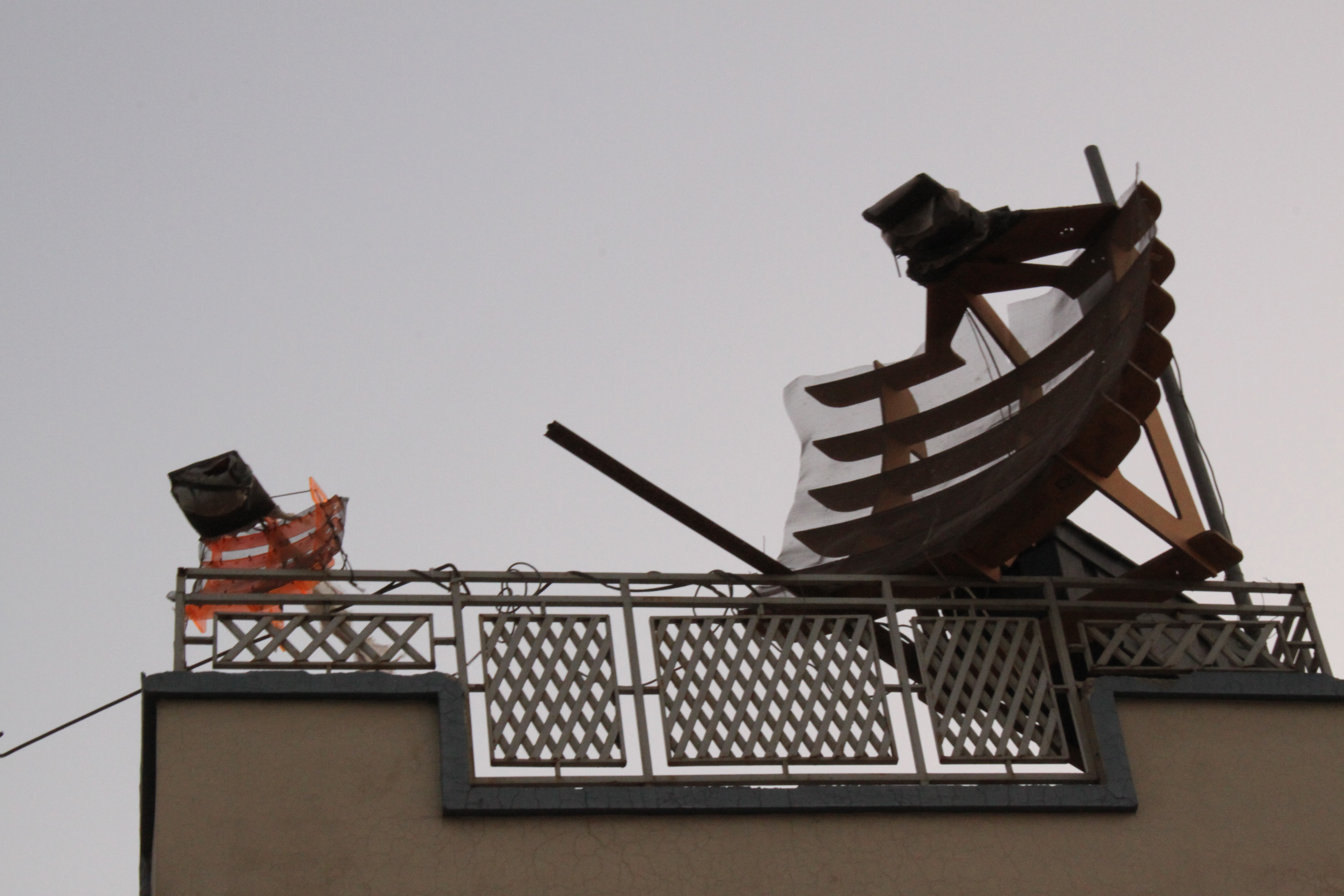
Antennae to receive TV channels on a roof in Jalalabad

Telecommunications infrastructure in parts of Nangarhar, especially around urban areas like Jalalabad, has traditionally included mobile‑network coverage and internet access, enabling communication and media consumption. However, since 2021 the situation has become unstable, as fibre‑optic and WiFi internet access has been repeatedly shut down by the government, and media‑licenses for several outlets in Nangarhar have been revoked, restricting independent media and broadcasting.

=== Transportation and infrastructure ===
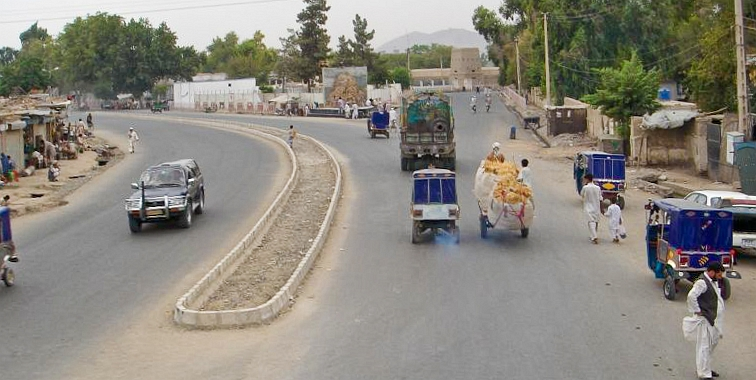
Typical street in Jalalabad

Nangarhar's transportation network is anchored by the Kabul–Jalalabad Road, which leads to the Torkham border crossing, Afghanistan's primary corridor to Pakistan. This route carries the bulk of the transit and freight traffic of eastern Afghanistan. Secondary roads, improved in recent years with international assistance, now connect Jalalabad with many districts, facilitating transport of agricultural products and goods. However, despite these developments, many rural roads remain in fragile condition and prone to disruption by floods or heavy rains, which periodically interrupts transport and trade flows.

== Demographics ==
=== Population ===
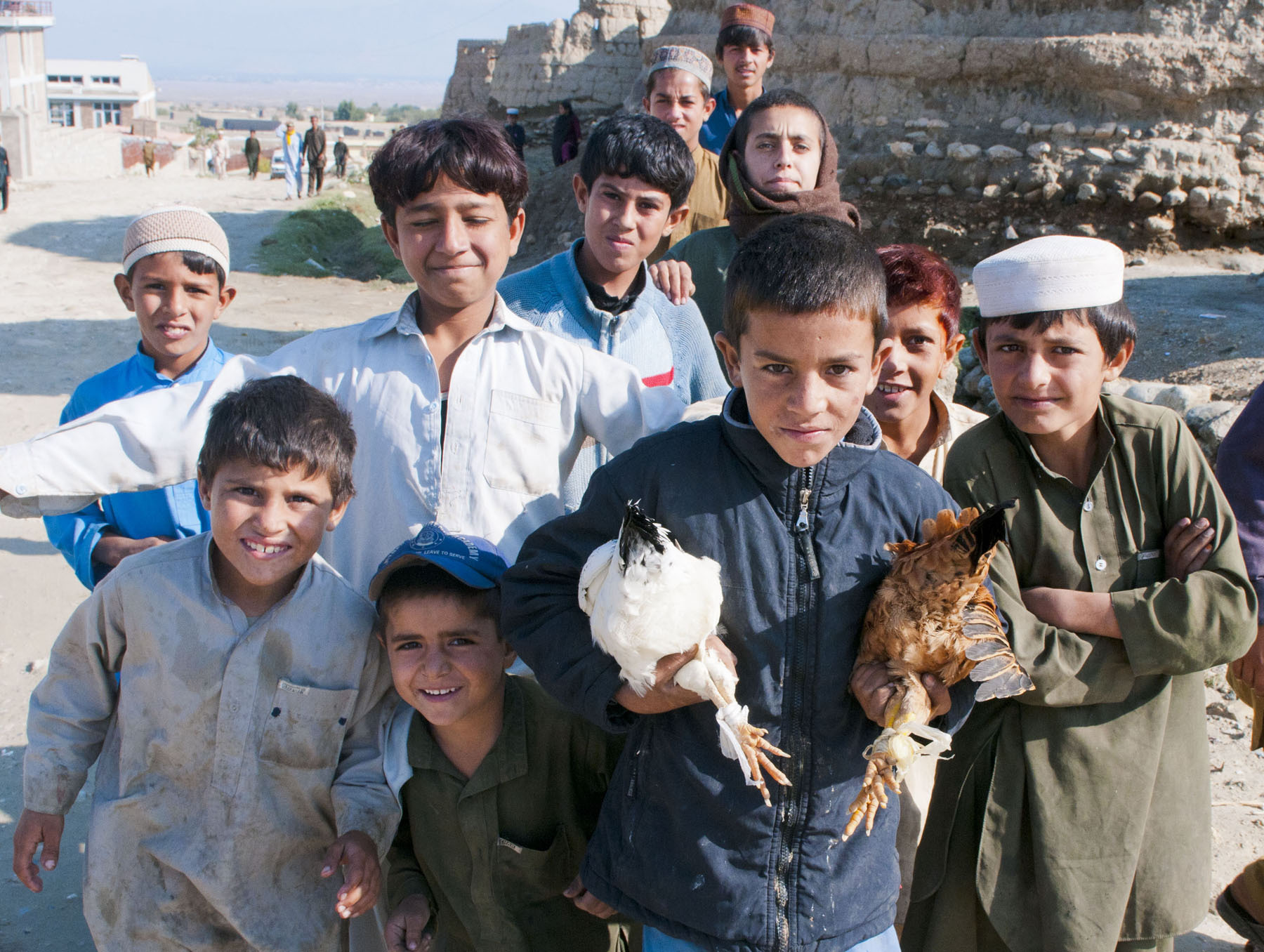
Local boys in Achin (2011)

As of 2023, Nangarhar has an estimated population of approximately 1.8 million people, distributed across urban centers, towns, and rural villages. The provincial capital Jalalabad contains the largest share of the urban population, followed by district centers such as Kama and Surkh Rod. The majority of the population lives in rural areas, where livelihoods depend largely on agriculture and cross-border trade. Poverty remains widespread, particularly in mountainous districts, with a multidimensional poverty index of 0.266 and 23.0% of the population living in severe poverty as of 2023. Many households rely on small-scale farming, casual labor, or remittances. Rapid population growth, seasonal displacement, and return migration have placed additional strain on housing, infrastructure, and public services.

=== Ethnicity, languages and religion ===
The population of Nangarhar is ethnically diverse but overwhelmingly Pashtun, who make up the clear majority of the province's inhabitants. Prominent Pashtun tribal confederations include both Ghilzai and Durrani, alongside numerous smaller tribal groupings. Significant minorities include the Pashai, especially in eastern and northeastern mountain districts, as well as smaller communities of Tajiks, Arabs, and other groups. Pashto is the dominant language and serves as the main lingua franca of the province, while Pashayi is widely spoken in eastern highland districts. Dari is used in administration, education, and interprovincial communication. Many residents are bilingual or multilingual due to long-standing trade and migration links with the Kabul Valley and Khyber Pass region. The population is overwhelmingly Sunni Muslim. Small minority communities of other religious groups formerly existed in urban areas, but their presence has declined significantly due to decades of conflict and emigration. Religious life remains closely tied to local mosques, madrasas, and tribal traditions.

Estimated ethnolinguistic and -religious composition
Ethnicity	Pashtun	Pashayi	Tajik/ Farsiwan	Arab	Hazara	Uzbek	Others	Sources
Period	Pashtun	Pashayi	Tajik/ Farsiwan	Arab	Hazara	Uzbek	Others	Sources

2004–2021 (Islamic Republic)	≥90%	<4 – 7%	2 – 5%	≤3%	0 – 3%	0 – 2%	<1 – 2%
2020 EU	1st	2nd	4th	3rd	–	–	–
2018 UN	predominant	small population	−	−	−	−	−
2015 CSSF (Note: Demographic information is based on data from 2015.)	90% (Note: excl. Kuchi.)	∅ (Note: incl. Arab, Pashayi and Kuchi.)	5%	∅	3%	2%	1%
2015 CP	90%	7%	∅	−	–	–	∅ (Note: incl. Gujjar.)
2015 NPS	90.1%	3.6%	1.6%	2.6%	–	–	2.1%
2011 PRT	90% (Note: incl. Mohmand, Shinwari, Khogyani, Safi, Nasir, Ibrahimkhel, Hoodkhel, Kharoti, Jabarkhel, Niazi and Kuchi.)	7%	∅	–	–	–	∅ (Note: incl. Gujjar and Nuristani.)
2011 USA	90%	7%	∅	–	–	–	∅
2009 ISW	>90%	∅	∅	∅	–	–	–

Legend:
- ∅: Ethnicity mentioned in source but not quantified
- –: Ethnicity not mentioned specifically
- Source abbreviations: Empirical sources: –, Government sources: CP – Colombo Plan, EU – European Union Agency for Asylum, PRT – Provincial Reconstruction Team of the United States government, UN – United Nations Assistance Mission in Afghanistan, Editorial sources: CSSF – Center for the Scientific Study of Families, ISW – Institute for the Study of War, NPS – Naval Postgraduate School, USA – United States Army

=== Education ===
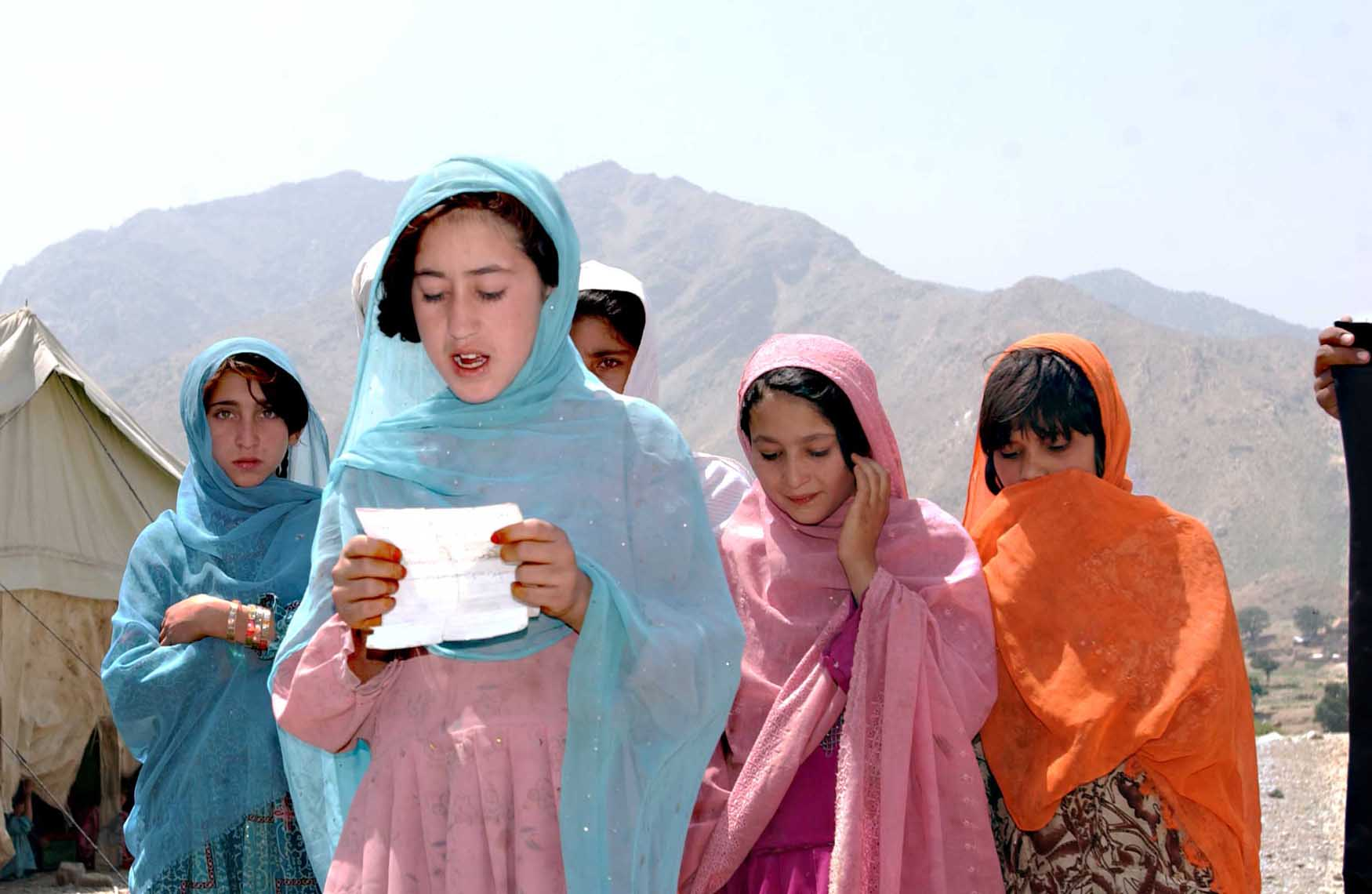
Local school girls in Nangarhar

Nangarhar University is located in the provincial capital, Jalalabad, and is one of the largest public universities in eastern Afghanistan. It provides higher education to several thousand students in fields such as medicine, agriculture, engineering, economics, and Islamic studies. Primary and secondary education is provided through a network of government and community-based schools distributed across the province. Educational access varies widely between urban and rural districts, with mountainous areas facing shortages of school buildings, trained teachers, and learning materials. Literacy rates remain low compared to national and regional averages, particularly among women, with the most recent estimates from 2011 indicating an overall literacy rate of 31% and an overall net enrolment rate for school-age children of approximately 51%.

Since 2021, educational policy has been reshaped under the Taliban administration. While male education continues across all levels, female access to secondary education and higher education has been severely restricted. At the same time, the number of religious madrasas has expanded throughout the province. NGO-supported literacy and vocational programs operate in limited form, mainly focusing on basic skills and humanitarian education.

=== Health ===
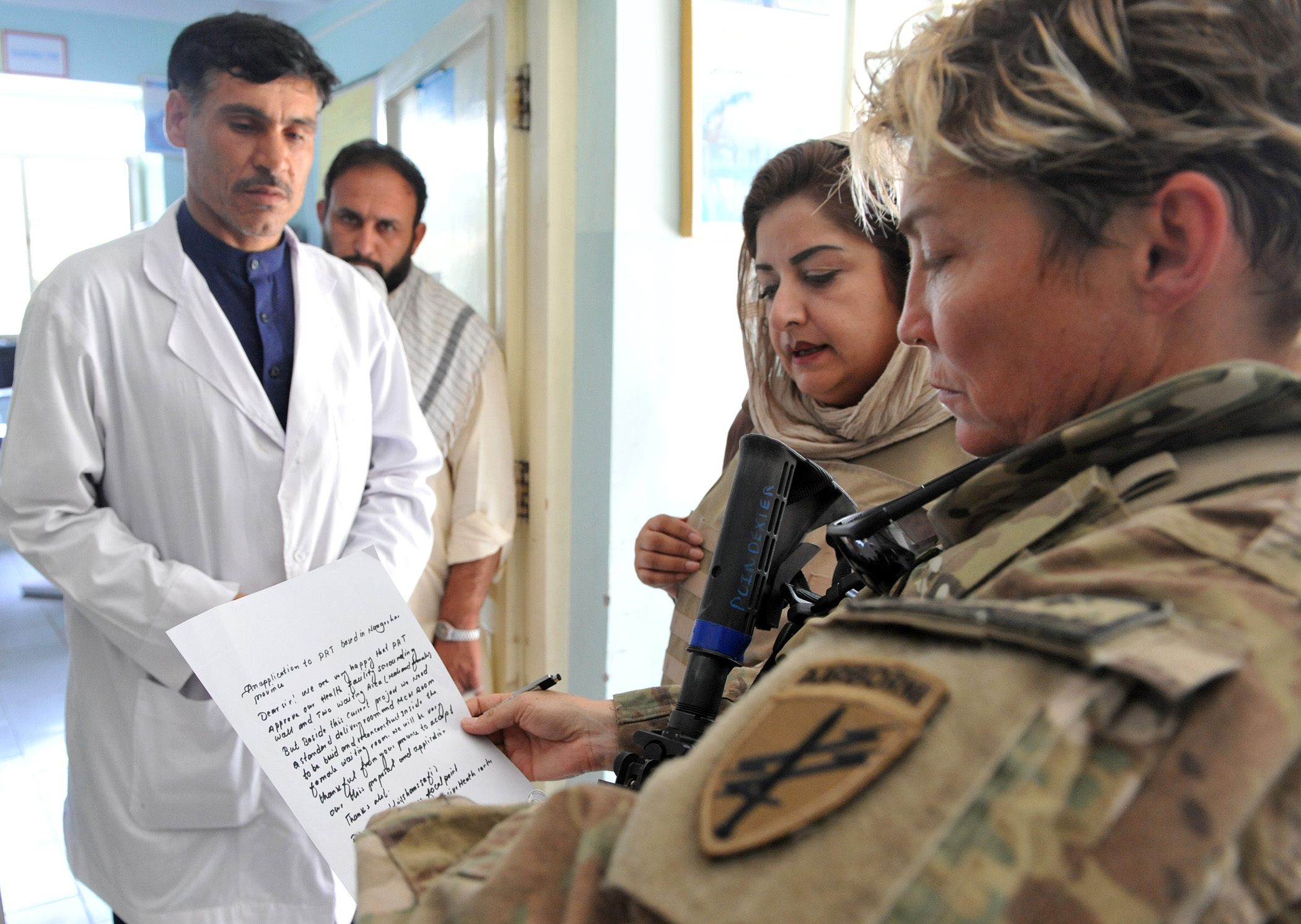
Doctors in the local hospital of Kama (2011)

Healthcare services in Nangarhar are concentrated primarily in Jalalabad, where the main provincial and regional hospitals are located, including the Nangarhar Regional Hospital. In addition to public facilities, a number of private clinics and pharmacies operate in urban districts. Rural populations often depend on small health posts or must travel long distances for treatment. Major public health challenges include maternal and infant mortality, malnutrition, limited access to clean drinking water, and outbreaks of infectious diseases, with the most recent available estimates from 2011 indicating that 8% of households had access to clean drinking water and 60% of births were attended by a skilled birth attendant. Healthcare delivery is supported by NGOs and international humanitarian organizations, which provide vaccinations, emergency treatment, and basic medical services, especially in underserved districts. Ongoing economic difficulties, medical staff shortages, and restricted funding continue to challenge the long-term development of the provincial health system.

== Culture ==
=== Music and dances ===
Traditional music and dance in Nangarhar are closely linked to eastern Pashtun tribal culture. The attan is the most widely performed communal dance, traditionally featured at weddings and tribal celebrations, and often accompanied by instruments such as the dhol and rubab. Folk songs and performances commonly reflect Pashtun cultural themes, including community life, seasonal events, and tribal identity. Public performances of music and dance have largely disappeared under Taliban rule, and many artists report that venues are closed or fear reprisals.

=== Dresses and attire ===
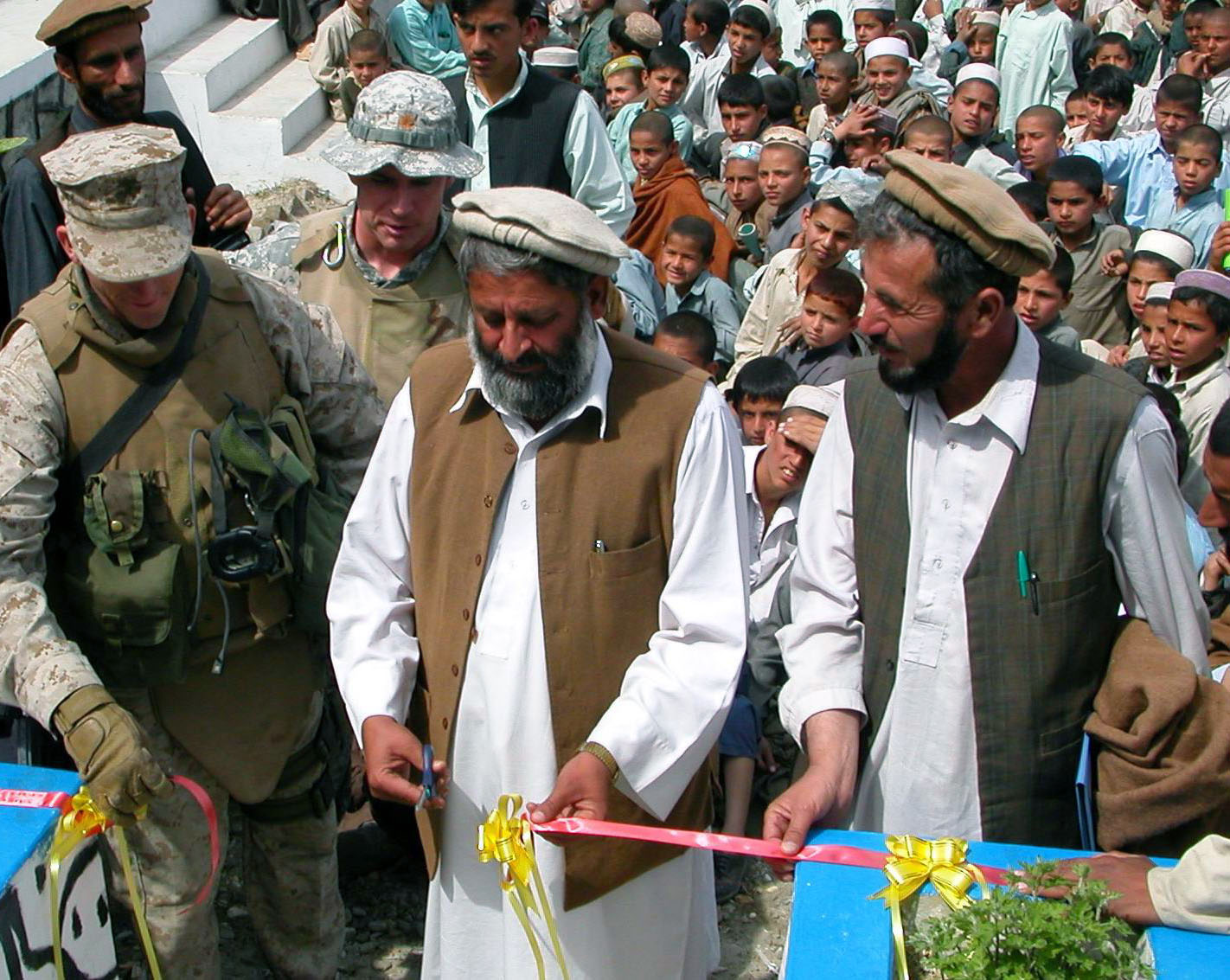
Nangarhari men in typical Afghan attire

In Nangarhar, as in much of Pashtun regions of Afghanistan, traditional clothing remains common. Men typically wear a perahan o tunban, often paired with a turban, pakol, or shawl. Women often wear long, loose dresses over wide trousers, sometimes with colourful embroidery and head scarves. For special occasions like weddings or festivals, more ornate outfits are used, with decorative embroidery and bright fabrics.

=== Cuisine ===
Nangarhar's cuisine is shaped by its fertile river valleys and agricultural production. Wheat bread, rice, lamb, and dairy products form the basis of daily meals. Signature dishes include qabeli palaw, qormas with vegetables or meat, grilled kababs, and local specialties based on fish and karahi dishes. Tea, especially green tea, is consumed throughout the day. Seasonal fruits such as pomegranates, apples, and grapes complement meals and are commonly served during festive occasions.

=== Architecture, art, and literature ===
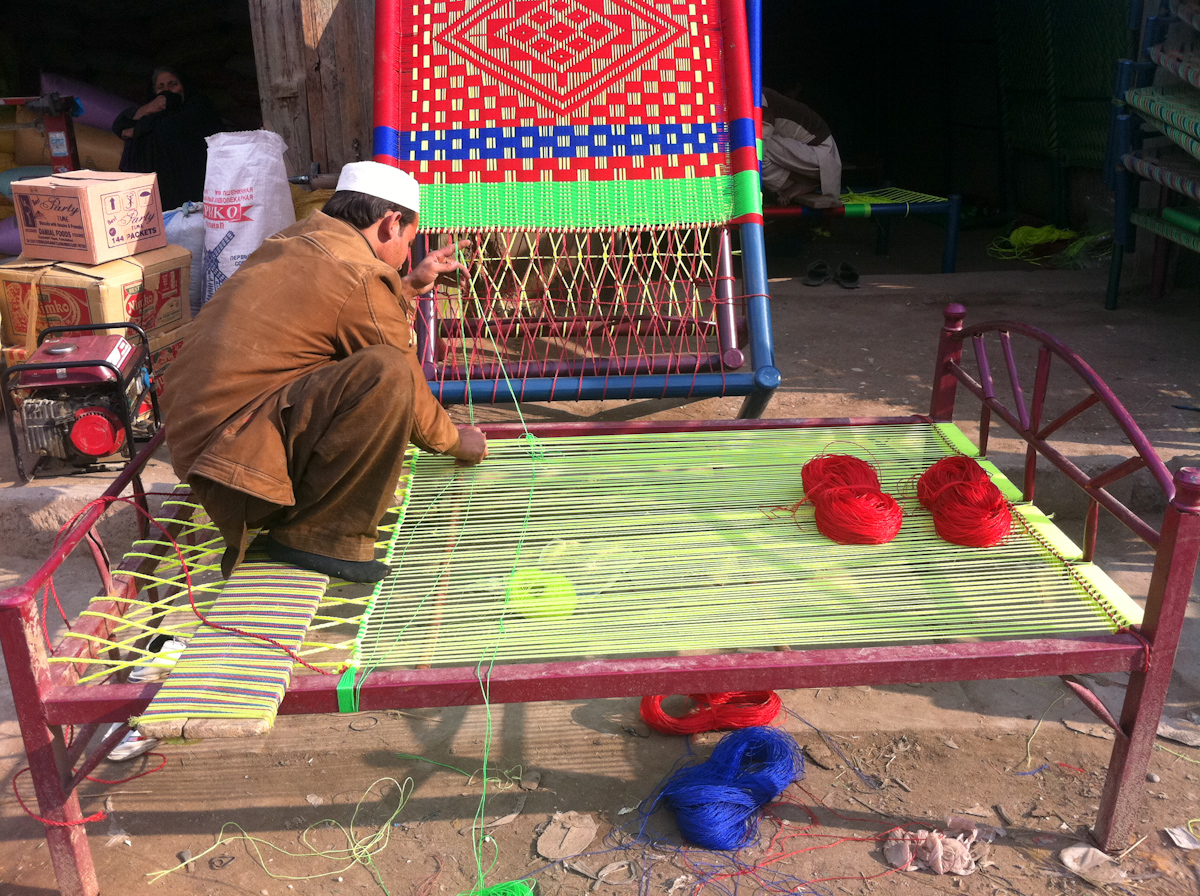
A child weaving an embroidered cot (2011)

Nangarhar's traditional architecture adapts to its river valley plains and surrounding hills. Homes are built from mudbrick, stone, and timber, often with flat or gently sloped roofs. Courtyards are common, allowing for family gatherings and livestock shelter. Villages often cluster along rivers or roads for access and defense. Mosques serve as religious and social centers. Local crafts include carpet weaving, embroidery, wood carving, pottery, and traditional jewelry. Oral literature, including Pashto poetry, epic storytelling, and folk tales, remains central, with elders and local poets preserving histories and tribal genealogies through recitations during social and religious events.

=== Media, entertainment, and festivities ===
Radio remains an important source of information for many people in rural areas of Nangarhar, while access to television and mobile internet tends to be stronger in urban centers such as Jalalabad and other major towns, although overall media freedom and content diversity have been heavily restricted since 2021 under Taliban rule. Restrictions include the suspension of broadcast licenses for local stations and new directives limiting content that can be aired, which has led to reduced programming and increased self-censorship by journalists and outlets.

Cultural celebrations such as Eid al-Fitr and Eid al-Adha, as well as life-cycle events like weddings and other family gatherings, have traditionally played a central role in communal life across Afghanistan, bringing together relatives and neighbours for shared meals, rituals, and social interaction. Although public forms of entertainment and music have been curtailed by the current authorities, many families continue to celebrate these events within private settings, and some cultural practices persist informally despite official restrictions.

=== Places of interest ===
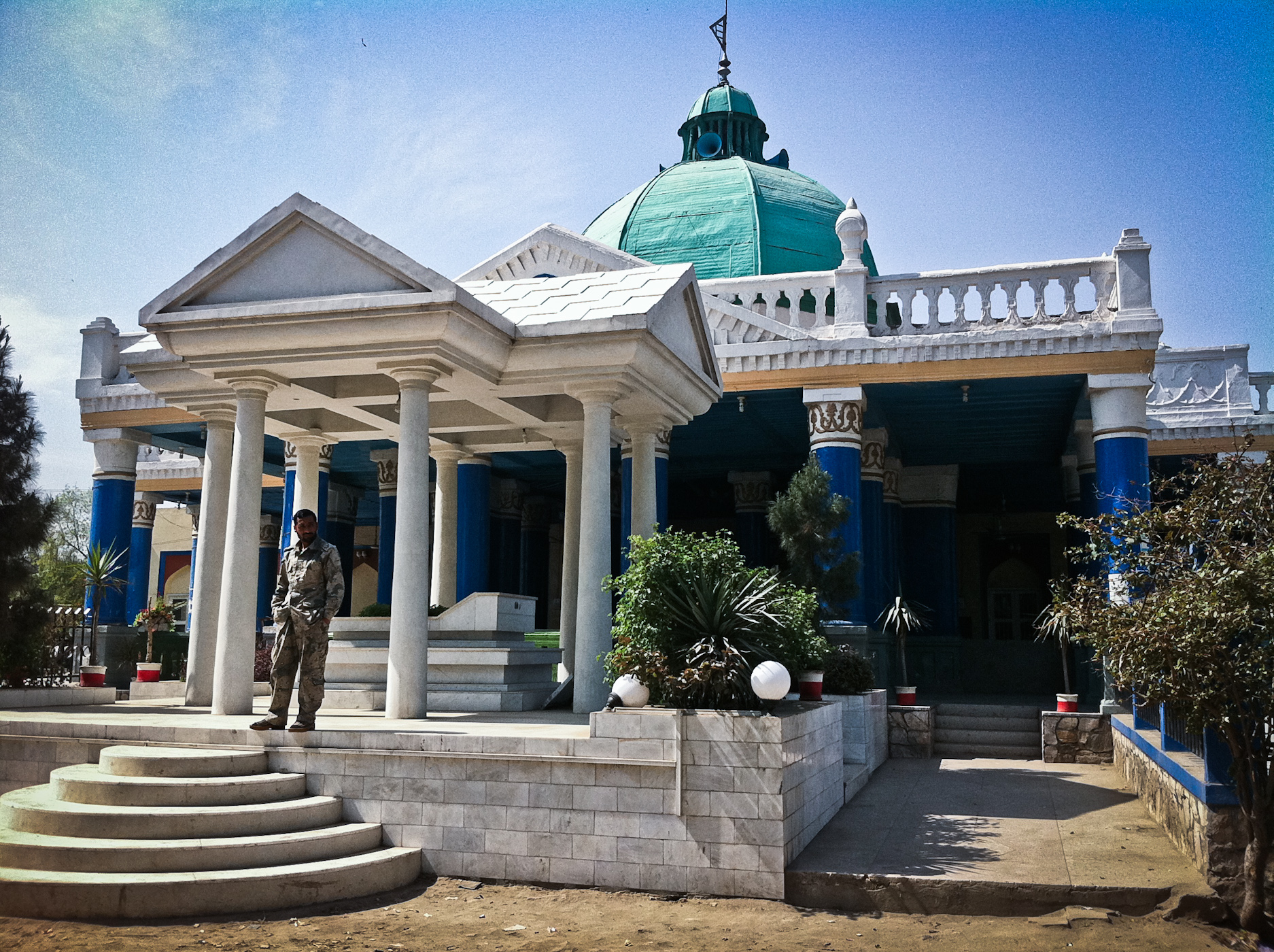
Mausoleum of Amanullah Khan

Nangarhar contains a number of cultural and natural points of interest. In Jalalabad, historic bazaars, mosques, and older residential quarters illustrate the city's long-established urban landscape, with notable landmarks like the mausoleum of Amanullah Khan, the Bahraabad stupa, and the Las Pa Las Baba shrine. The province also features additional religious shrines and Sufi sites, as well as natural areas such as the Sardeh Band reservoir, the Khyber Pass and its surrounding foothills, and the vicinity of the Spin Ghar mountain range, the Darunta Dam and the Kabul River, which are used for local visits and seasonal activities. Archaeological surveys have documented previously unrecorded historical sites across the province, including ancient structural remains and settlement traces dating to the pre-Islamic and Kushan periods.

=== Sports ===
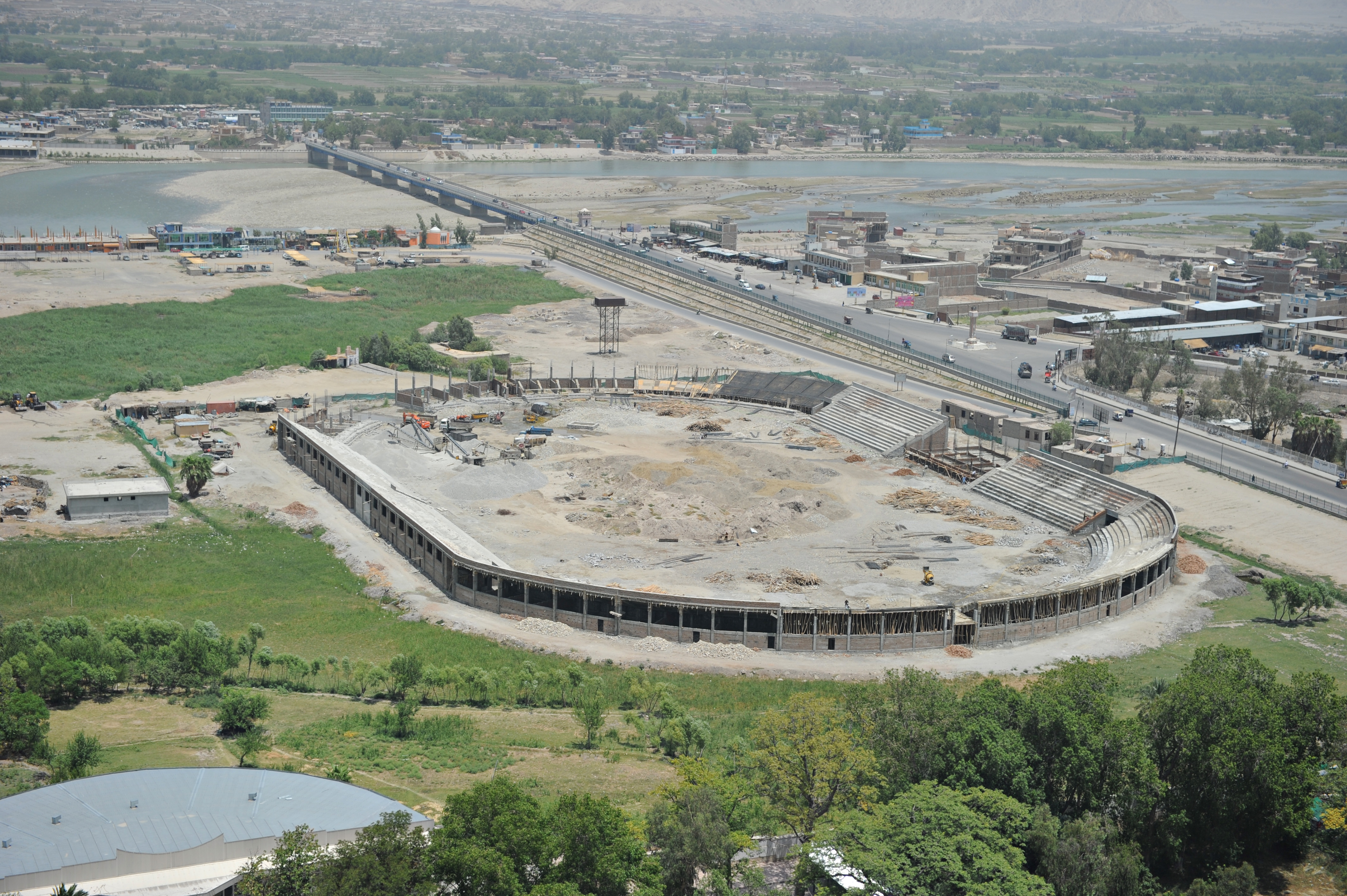
The Sherzai Cricket Stadium under construction in June 2011

In recent decades, cricket has become the most popular modern sports in Nangarhar, especially among youth, and Jalalabad is widely viewed as the center of Afghan cricket development. Many prominent national team players, including Rashid Khan, have roots in the province. In national cricket competitions such as the Shpageeza Cricket League, Nangarhar is represented by the Speenghar Tigers franchise, which covers the eastern provinces of the country. The Ghazi Amanullah International Cricket Stadium, located in Ghazi Amanullah Town near Jalalabad, was Afghanistan's first international-standard cricket stadium, with a seating capacity of 14,000, making it the largest stadium in the country at the time of its inauguration. Subsequently, the Najeeb Tarakai Cricket Ground was constructed in Jalalabad, making Nangarhar the first province to feature two cricket stadiums.

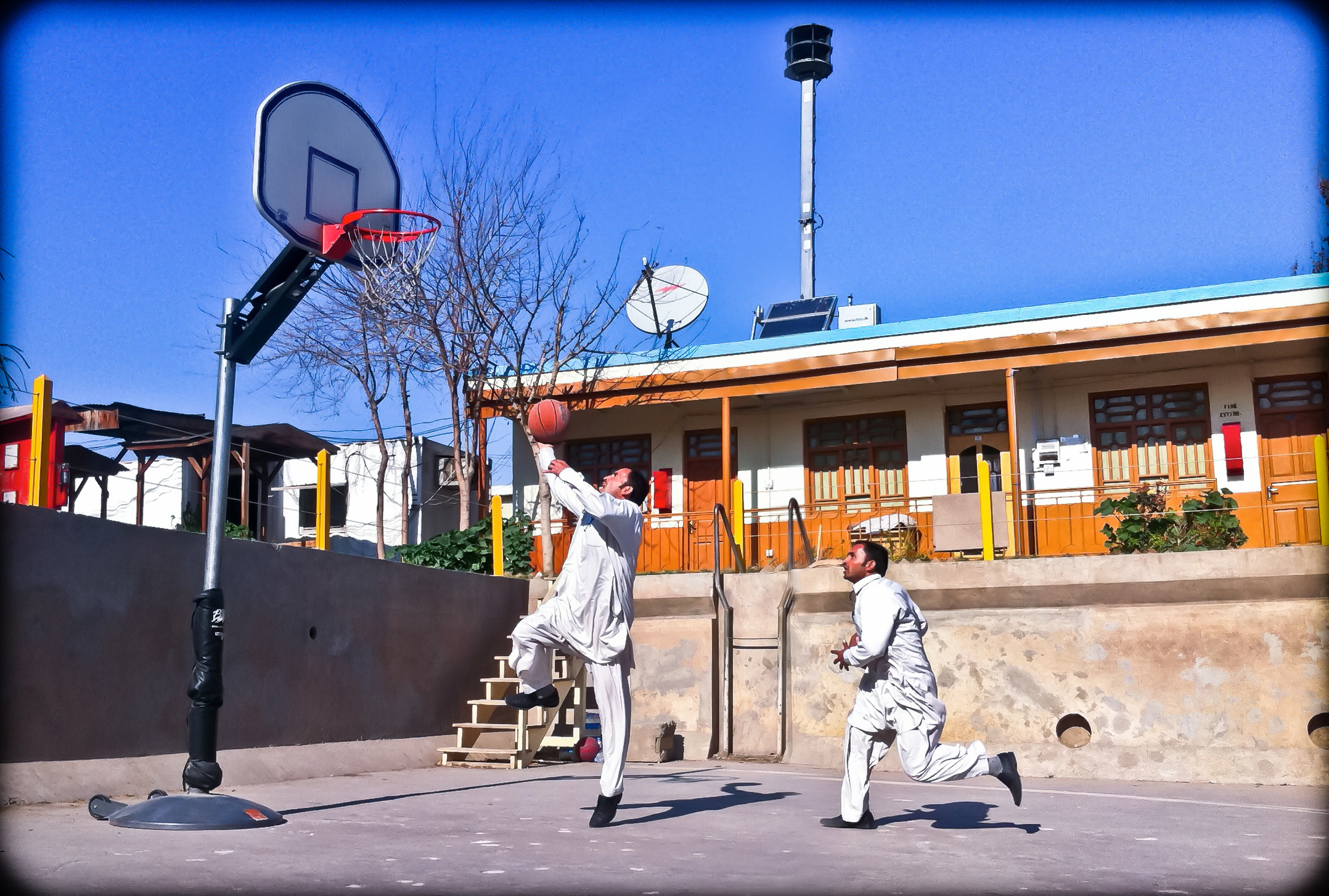
Local men playing basketball in their freetime

Football is also widely played in Nangarhar. During the period of the Islamic Republic, the province was represented in national competitions by De Spin Ghar Bazan FC, which served as the regional team for Nangarhar alongside Laghman, Kapisa, Kunar, and Nuristan within the Afghan Premier League. Other modern sports practiced in the province include volleyball and basketball, which are commonly played due to minimal equipment requirements. Private gyms in urban areas provide facilities for boxing, taekwondo, and general fitness training. Traditional sports continue to play a role in cultural life, particularly local forms of wrestling and horse riding, which are closely associated with community festivals, tribal prestige, and social gatherings.

== Notable people ==
=== Historical figures ===
- Wazir Akbar Khan, 19th-century Emir of Afghanistan, spent considerable time and died in Jalalabad

=== Modern figures ===
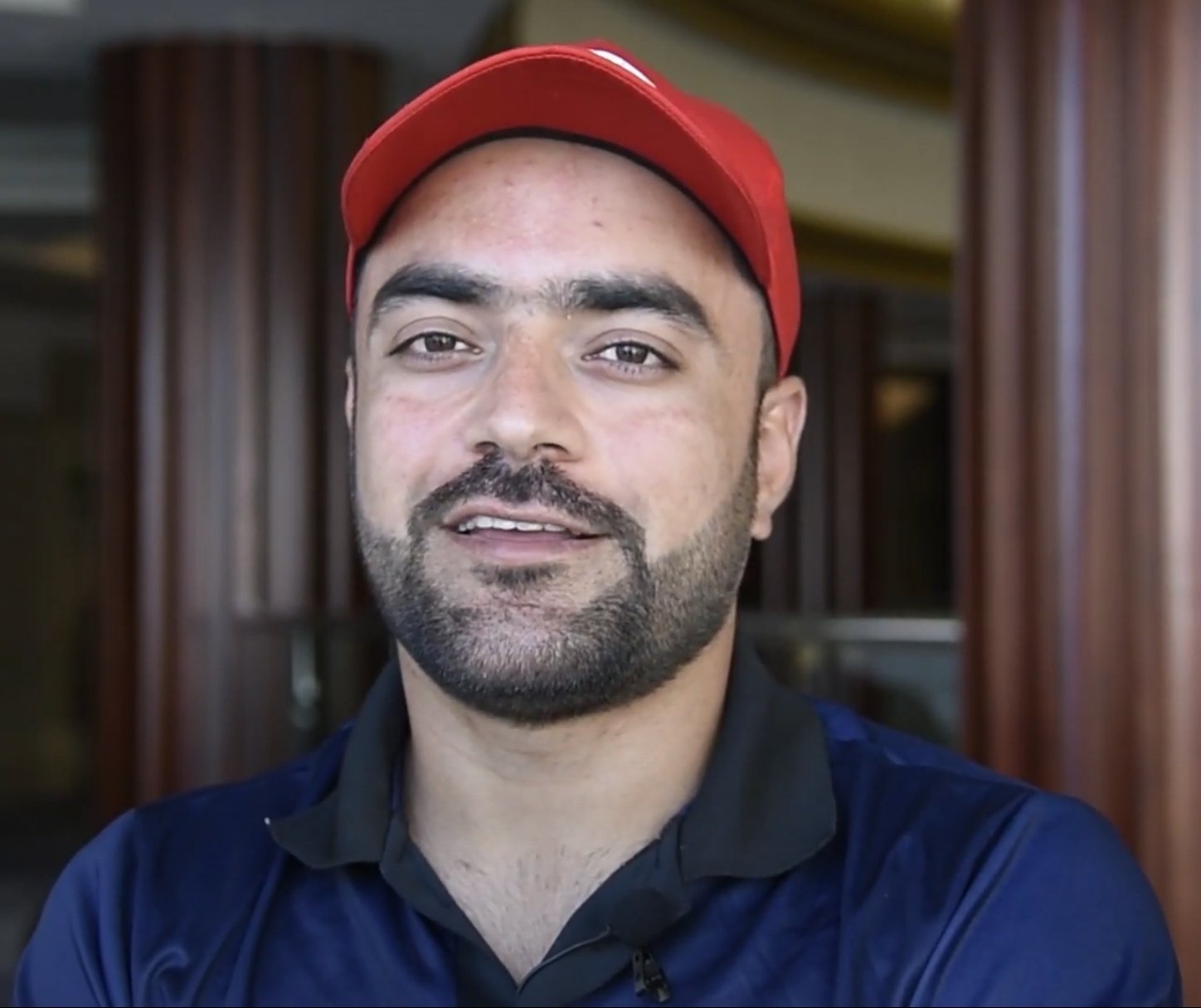
Rashid Khan was named the Cricketer of the Decade in the T20I format by the ICC

- Members of the politically influential Arsala family, including:
  - Abdul Haq, politician and mujahideen commander
  - Abdul Qadeer, politician, former minister and Vice President of Afghanistan
  - Din Mohammad, politician and former governor
  - Hedayat Amin Arsala, politician, former minister and Vice President of Afghanistan
- Fareed Ahmad, national cricket player
- Qais Ahmad, national cricket player
- Abdullah Ahmadzai, national cricket player
- Zubaid Akbari, national cricket player
- Aftab Alam, national cricket player
- Ismat Alam, national cricket player
- Rokhan Barakzai, former national cricket player
- Izatullah Dawlatzai, Afghan-German national cricket player for both national teams
- Ahmed Shah Durrani, cricket umpire
- Salim Durani, Nangarhar-born Indian cricketer
- Mohammad Amin Fatemi, politician and former minister
- Ahmed Gailani, politician and mujahideen leader
- Hasti Gul, former national cricket player
- Qamar Gula, singer
- Sayed Yousuf Halim, politician and former minister
- Amir Hamza, national cricket player
- Hamid Hassan, national cricket player
- Riaz Hassan, national cricket player
- Jan Alam Hassani, former national volleyball player and president of the Afghan Sports Federation
- Abdul Baqi Haqqani, politician and minister
- Mohammad Ishaq, national cricket player
- Mohammad Yunus Khalis, politician, co-founder of the Hezb-i Islami and mujahideen commander
- Rashid Khan, national cricket player
- Latif Nangarhari, singer
- Shabir Noori, former national cricket player
- Hamidullah Qalandarzai, politician and former governor
- Rahmatullah Rahmat, politician and former governor
- Jamila Saadat, human rights activist
- Karim Sadiq, former national cricket player
- Amanullah Sailaab Sapi, poet and writer
- Mohammad Musa Shafiq, politician and former Prime Minister of Afghanistan
- Shafiqullah, former national cricket player
- Nigara Shaheen, judoka
- Mohammad Shahzad, former national cricket player
- Samiullah Shinwari, former national cricket player
- Sayed Shirzad, former national cricket player
- Najeeb Tarakai, former national cricket player
- Matiullah Turab, poet
- Fazlullah Wahidi, politician and former governor
- Mirwais Yasini, politician and former MP
- Modaser Zekria, former national football player

== See also ==
- Eastern Province, Afghanistan
- Provinces of Afghanistan
