= Naim Kuchi =

Afghan Guantanamo detainee

Haji Naeem Kochai
- Born: 1940 (age 85–86)
- Arrested: January 1, 2003; Nangahar Province, Islamic Republic of Afghanistan
- Citizenship: Afghanistan
- Detained at: Guantanamo
- ISN: 931
- Charge: No charge (extrajudicial detention)
- Status: Repatriated

Naim Kuchi is a citizen of Afghanistan who was held in extrajudicial detention in the United States's Guantanamo Bay detention camps in Cuba. His Guantanamo Internment Serial Number was 931. Joint Task Force Guantanamo estimate that he was born in 1940 in Logar, Afghanistan.

Kuchi is a senior tribal leader within Afghanistan's Kuchis ethnic group. During former President Burhanuddin Rabbani's government (1992–1996), Naim Kuchi became Deputy Minister for Tribal Affairs. He also became the governor of Bamiyan province during Taliban's regime. The Edmonton Sun described him as the Kuchis' "best known leader."

== Release ==
According to medical records published on March 15, 2007, Kuchi's "in-process date" was March 23, 2003. Records showed that Kuchi was 69 inches tall and his weight ranged from 175 pounds when he arrive to 185 pounds. Nine weights were recorded, including his weight upon arrival in March 2003, and a monthly weigh-in from January to August 2004.

Kuchi was repatriated on September 18, 2004, seven weeks after the Office for the Administrative Review of Detained Enemy Combatants began convening Combatant Status Review Tribunal, but no CSR Tribunal was convened to review his status. Dawd Gul, one of the other nine Afghan captives repatriated that day, had had a CSR Tribunal prior to his repatriation.

== McClatchy interview ==
On June 15, 2008, the McClatchy News Service published articles based on interviews with 66 former Guantanamo captives. McClatchy reporters interviewed Naim Kuchi. He declined—twice—to be interviewed by McClatchy reporters. When reporters showed up at his house, without invitation, he told reporters that he got depressed speaking about Guantanamo. He also told them he suffered from headaches and hypertension arising from the conditions of his detention.

The McClatchy report stated that other sources told them that Kuchi was a senior leader in the Ahmadzai tribe, which is known as the biggest Pashtun tribe. Thus, many Afghans consider him as the most influential and legitimate Afghan leader.

Since his repatriation, Kuchi has worked with national peace and reconciliation efforts.

The McClatchy report states that when Americans apprehended him on January 1, 2003, hundreds of members of his tribe had come to Kabul to protest. The USA has offered no explanation for his apprehension or detention.
