= Darunta =

Village in Nangarhar Province, Afghanistan

Darunta درونټه
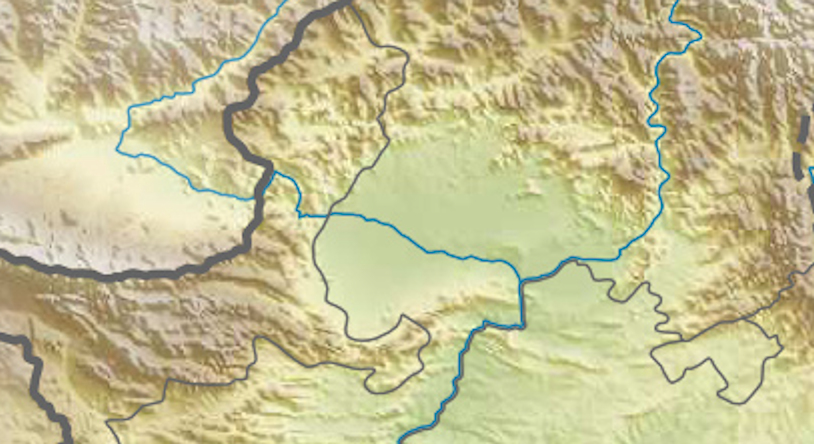
- Location in Afghanistan Darunta درونټه (Gandhara)
- Coordinates: 34°28′43″N 70°21′44″E
- Country: Afghanistan
- Province: Nangarhar Province
- Time zone: UTC+4:30

Darūnṭa (Pashto: درونټه) (or Khayrow Khel), also spelled Daruntah or Derunta, is a village in Jalalabad District of Nangarhar province. It is located next to Jalalabad city on route AO1 in Afghanistan.

Numerous remains of stupas from the 1st century BCE- 1st century CE, can be found around Darunta, such as in Bimaran.

It gave its name to the Darunta training camp, allegedly affiliated with al Qaeda, located north of the village, across the Darunta Dam.

== Gallery ==
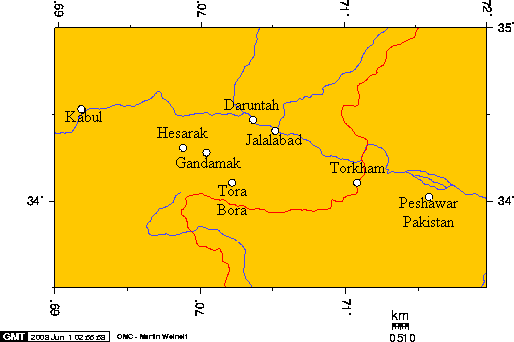
Darunta, Kabul, Peshawar, and some cities in Nangarhar, Afghanistan.

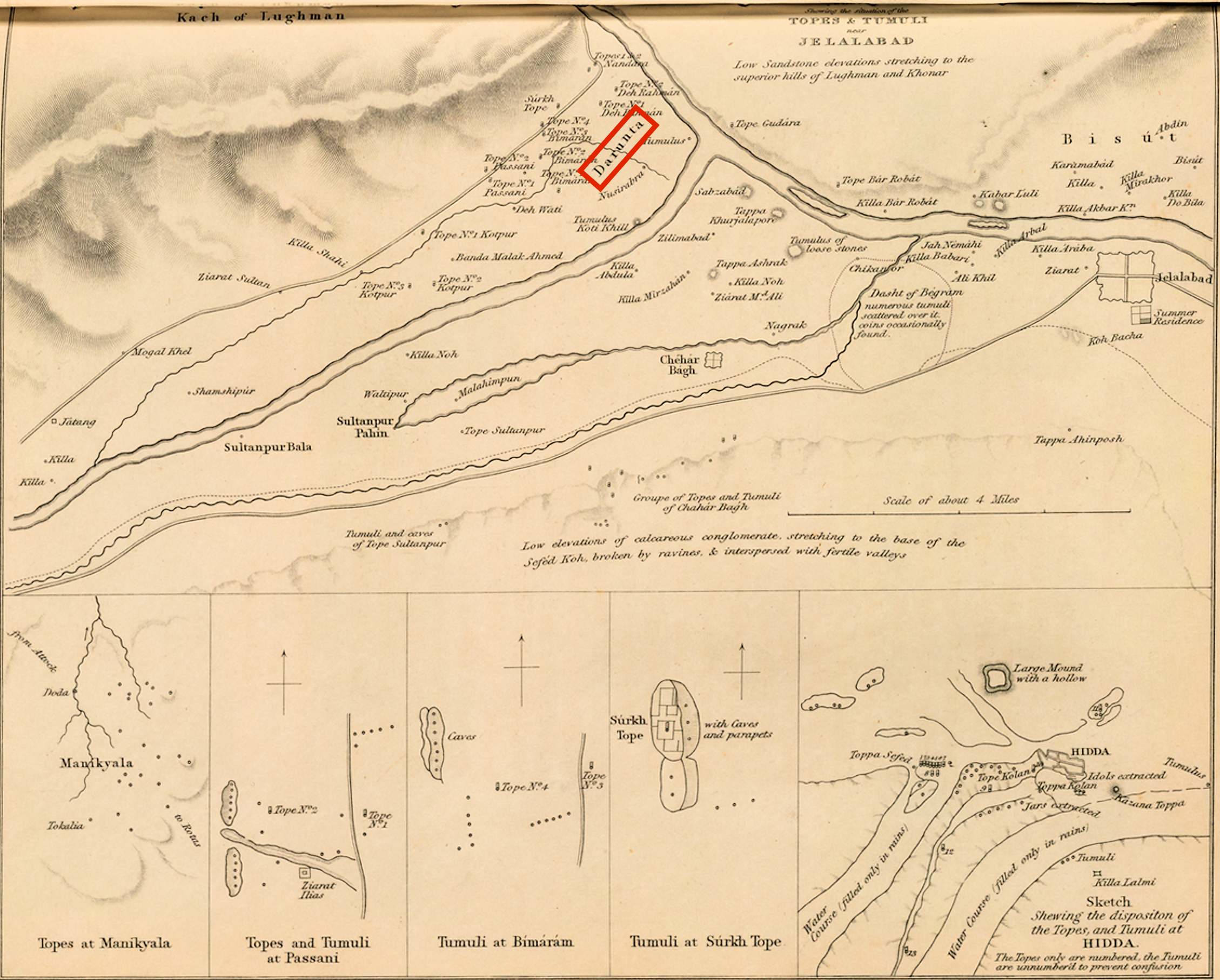
Stupas around Jelalabad, Darunta

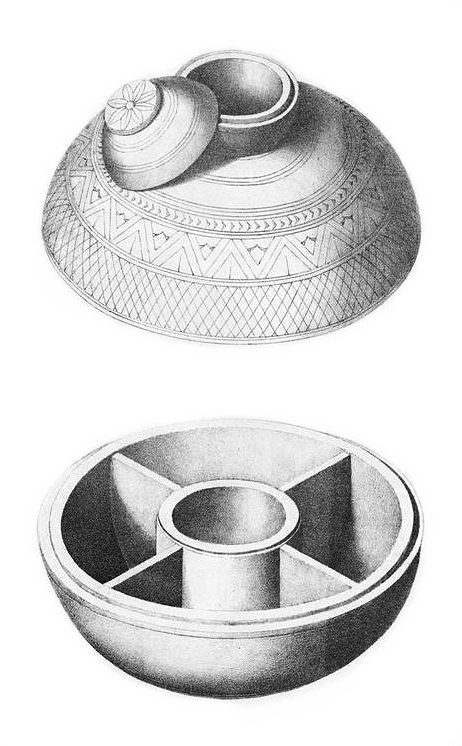
The Darunta Buddhist reliquary from Passani Stupa No.2, 1st century CE.

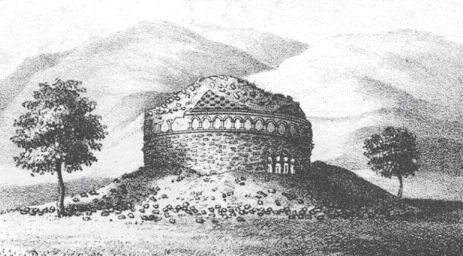
The Stupa Nb.2 at Bimaran, where the Bimaran casket was excavated. Drawing by Charles Masson.

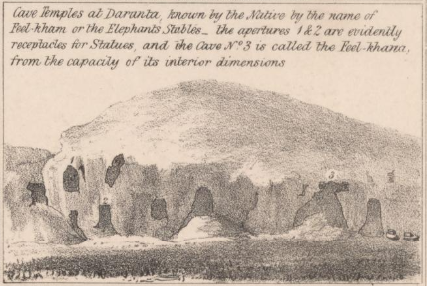
The cave temples at Darunta.

== See also ==
- Nangarhar Province
