= 2026 Afghanistan–Pakistan war =

Ongoing armed conflict in South Asia

- Part of the Afghanistan–Pakistan conflict, the Insurgency in Khyber Pakhtunkhwa, and the Insurgency in Balochistan
- Location of Afghanistan (orange) and Pakistan (green)
Date	21 February 2026 – present (9 months)
Location	Afghanistan; Pakistan
Status	Ongoing

Belligerents
Pakistan; Anti-Taliban Groups; Afghanistan Freedom Front; Homeland Corps Front	Afghanistan; Pakistani Taliban; Ittehad-ul-Mujahideen Pakistan; al-Qaeda (claimed); Jamaat-ul-Ahrar; Islamic State; ISIS-K (Note: Targeted in initial Pakistani airstrikes)

Commanders and leaders
(Pakistan) Shehbaz Sharif; (Pakistan) Asim Munir; (Pakistan) Khawaja Asif; (Pakistan) Zaheer Ahmad Babar	(Afghanistan) Hibatullah Akhundzada; (Afghanistan) Mullah Yaqoob; (Afghanistan) Fasihuddin Fitrat; (Pakistani Taliban) Noor Wali Mehsud; (Pakistani Taliban) Khalid Masood X

Units involved
Pakistan Armed Forces; Pakistan Army; XI Corps; XII Corps; Artillery Regiment Corps; Air Defence Command; Sindh Regiment; Pakistan Air Force; Civil Armed Forces; Frontier Corps; FC KPK (North); FC KPK (South); FCB (North); FCB (South); Federal Constabulary	Afghan Armed Forces; Islamic National Army; 201 Corps; 203 Corps; 205 Corps; 209 Corps; 313 Corps; Taliban Border Police; 3rd Battalion; Afghan Air Force (Note: The Afghan Air Force in its current form is not a true conventional air force and does not possess any functional fighter jets or other manned combat aircraft. However, Afghanistan claims drone attacks on Pakistan as being conducted by its "air force".); Pakistani Taliban; Ali Malang group; Khattab group; Ittehad-ul-Mujahideen Pakistan; Hafiz Gul Bahadur Group; Aswad-ul-Khurasan; Al-Hamid suicide force; al-Qaeda in the Indian Subcontinent (claimed); Jamaat-ul-Ahrar; Military of the Islamic State

Casualties and losses
Per Pakistan: (Pakistan) 13 soldiers killed, 27 injured Claimed by Afghanistan: (Pakistan) 327 soldiers killed, 350+ injured	Per Afghanistan: (Afghanistan) 28 soldiers killed, 42 injured (as of 3 March) (Note: Casualties suffered from clashes along the border.); Per local Afghan sources: (Afghanistan) 40 soldiers killed in Nuristan province; Claimed by Pakistan: (Pakistani Taliban) 80+ TTP militants killed; (Afghanistan) 796 Taliban militants killed, 1,043+ injured
- 1,100 Afghan civilians killed/wounded and 730 Pakistani civilians killed (as of 22 October 2026); 779 Afghan civilians killed, 626 injured (per Afghanistan) (Note: 18 killed in airstrike on 21 February, and 761 killed, 626 injured from 22 February to 3 April.); 358 Afghan civilians killed, 220 injured (per UNAMA) (Note: 13 killed, 7 injured in airstrike on 21 February. 76 killed, 213 injured from 26 February to 16 March. 269+ killed in an airstrike on drug rehabilitation center.); 115,000 Afghan civilians displaced (per UNHCR); 3,000 Pakistani civilians displaced (per UNHCR)

Since February 2026, Pakistan and Afghanistan have been engaged in the most sustained cross-border conflict between the two countries since the Taliban's 2021 return to power in Afghanistan. The conflict began with Pakistani airstrikes on alleged Pakistani Taliban (TTP) and Islamic State – Khorasan Province camps in eastern Afghanistan, and escalated within a week into what Pakistan's defence minister, Khawaja Asif, called an "open war" fought under the codename Operation Ghazab lil-Haq. (Note: Arabic: غضب للحق, lit. 'Wrath for the Truth')

The war has combined air and artillery exchanges along the Durand Line with a parallel insurgency inside Pakistan, as the TTP and allied groups intensified attacks in Khyber Pakhtunkhwa and Balochistan. Two ceasefire agreements for the Islamic holidays of Eid al-Fitr and Eid al-Adha briefly reduced hostilities but did not end them; fighting continued at lower intensity through the summer of 2026 and flared again in September following a mass-casualty attack in Kohat, Pakistan.

== Background ==
The conflict occurred against the backdrop of long-running tensions between Afghanistan and Pakistan rooted in disputes dating back to the independence of Pakistan in 1947. Afghanistan has historically challenged the legitimacy of the Durand Line, which forms the international border between the two nations, contributing to decades of strained relations and periodic clashes.

Relations deteriorated further following the Taliban's return to power in 2021 in the aftermath of the US withdrawal from Afghanistan. Pakistan has repeatedly accused Afghanistan of providing safe haven to militant groups, particularly the Tehreek-e-Taliban Pakistan (TTP), which has carried out attacks in Pakistan in order to establish an Islamic emirate, similar to the model of government in Afghanistan. Taliban authorities have generally denied these allegations.

Tensions escalated in 2025 after a surge in cross-border violence and militant attacks. In October 2025, some of the deadliest clashes in years led to a Qatar-mediated ceasefire, but its implementation proved to be fragile, and follow-up talks in Doha and Istanbul failed to produce a lasting agreement. Low-level skirmishes continued along the border in the following months.

In early 2026, Pakistan experienced a series of major attacks, primarily in its frontier provinces of Balochistan and Khyber Pakhtunkhwa, alongside a major suicide bombing in the capital of Islamabad. Pakistani officials attributed several of these attacks to militant groups operating from Afghan territory and warned that military action could follow if the Taliban did not act against these groups.

On 11 February 2026, Pakistani Defence Minister Khawaja Asif warned that Pakistan may take action against militants in Afghanistan before the start of the Islamic month of Ramadan if the Taliban failed to deter militant activities from the territory under their control.

Following further attacks in February, Pakistani officials signalled that their restraint had been exhausted, setting the stage for the airstrikes that began the conflict.

== Course of war ==
=== First week (21–27 February) ===
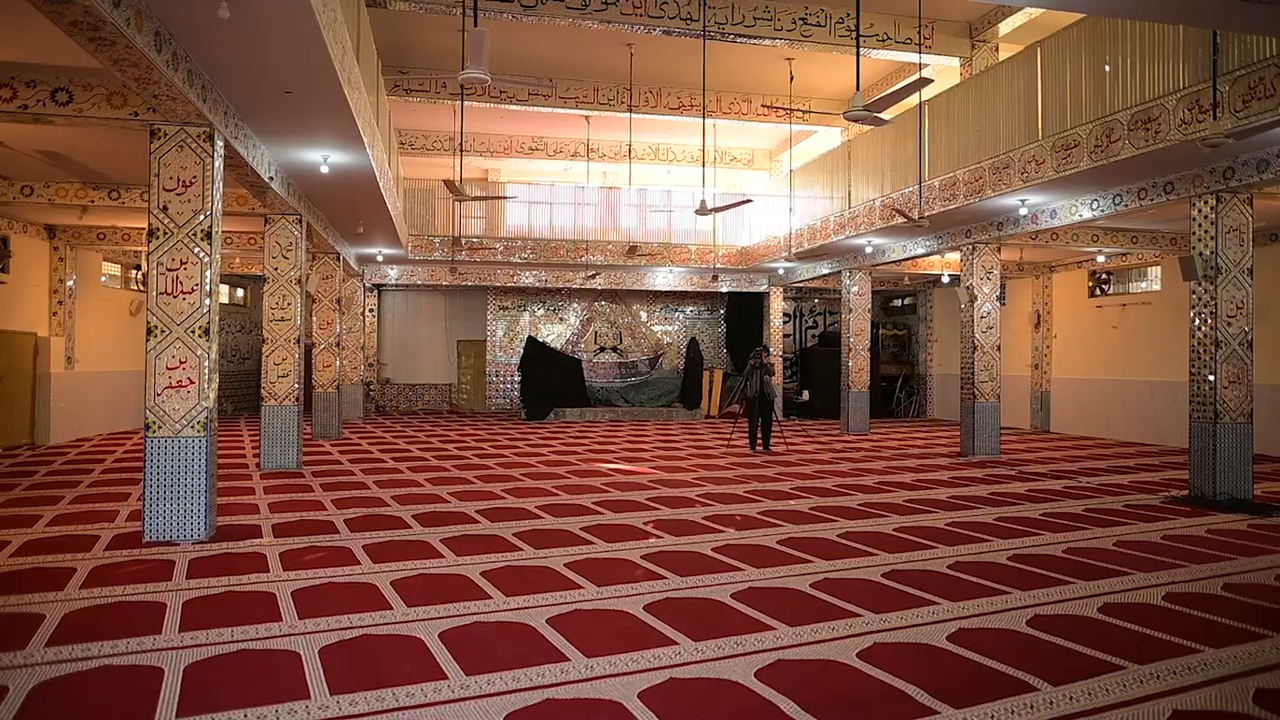
Interior of the Khadija Tul Kubra Mosque in Islamabad following a February 2026 suicide bombing that Pakistan blamed on militants operating from Afghanistan

During the night of 21 February, local sources in Afghanistan reported airstrikes in parts of Nangarhar, Paktika, and Khost provinces. In Nangarhar, strikes were reported in the Bihsud and Khogyani districts, while in Paktika, strikes were reported in the Barmal and Urgun districts. Local sources reported that the airstrikes in Nangarhar's Bihsud district struck a civilian home, trapping 23 people beneath the rubble. Pakistan's Ministry of Information and Broadcasting (MolB) stated that the Pakistani military conducted "intelligence-based selective targeting" of seven terrorist camps and hideouts along the Afghanistan-Pakistan border region. The Taliban claimed that the targets included civilian homes and a religious seminary.

In a late-night press release, Pakistani officials confirmed that the Pakistan Air Force (PAF), under the command of Air Chief Marshal Zaheer Ahmad Babar, had carried out airstrikes in Afghanistan. Officials said the strikes were selective and intelligence-based, and targeted seven militant camps and hideouts linked to the Tehrik-i-Taliban Pakistan (TTP) and the Islamic State – Khorasan Province (ISIS–K) near the Afghanistan-Pakistan border. Pakistani officials added that the strikes were conducted as retaliation for recent terror attacks in Islamabad, Bajaur, and Bannu. A Pakistani newspaper, citing military sources, reported that seven TTP hideouts in Nangarhar, Paktika, and Khost provinces were destroyed and that more than 80 militants were killed; however, Taliban officials only reported airstrikes in the Nangarhar and Paktika provinces, adding that an airstrike in Bihsud District killed 18 civilians, including 11 children. Taliban officials condemned the airstrikes and warned of a calculated response at an appropriate time.

Shayesteh Jan Ahadi, former head of the Paktia Provincial Council, stated that Pakistani airstrikes in several districts were very widespread and powerful. The United Nations Assistance Mission in Afghanistan (UNAMA) reported that Pakistan carried out airstrikes between 11:45 p.m. on 21 February and 12:15 a.m. on 22 February. UNAMA also reported that airstrikes in Paktika province damaged or destroyed infrastructure. On 23 February, UNAMA confirmed that over 13 civilians had been killed by the Pakistani airstrikes, with an additional seven injured.

Pakistan described the operation as a retributive response to a series of suicide bombings inside Pakistan, including the 6 February bombing of a Shia mosque in Islamabad that killed 31 worshippers (claimed by ISIS–K), and attacks in Bajaur and Bannu districts in Khyber Pakhtunkhwa during the early days of Ramadan. Pakistan also claimed that the strikes were "intelligence-based, selective operations" against seven camps and hideouts belonging to the Tehreek-e-Taliban Pakistan (TTP), its affiliates, and the Islamic State – Khorasan Province (ISKP). This was the seventh time Pakistan has carried out airstrikes in Afghanistan since the Afghan Taliban took over in August 2021.

The Taliban-led Afghan government condemned the strikes as a "blatant violation of Afghanistan's territorial integrity" and a breach of international law, stating that they hit civilian homes, a religious seminary, and other civilian structures, killing at least 18 people (including women and children) and leaving others missing under rubble. In addition, one family in Girdi Kas lost 18 of 23 members, and additional casualties were reported in Paktika. Afghan officials vowed an "appropriate and measured response" at a suitable time.

On 24 February, the hostilities resumed as both countries exchanged fire along their borders while both sides blamed each other for provocations. Zabihullah Noorani, head of the Afghan information department in eastern Nangarhar, stated that Pakistani troops carried out the first shots in the Shahkot area near the border. Pakistan claimed that its forces retaliated in response to a mortar and rocket from Afghanistan on Jarobi Kandao area of the Zakhakhel tehsil, with skirmishes later spreading to Wragha, Maro Sar, Shahkot and Zakhakhel. Pakistan also claimed that Taliban initiated 'unprovoked firing" in Torkham and Tirah. Both light and heavy weapons were used in skirmishes in Nazyan and Achin. An Afghan militant was killed during an infiltration attempt across the border in North Waziristan District. Pakistani military claimed to have killed 34 TTP militants in engagement throughout Khyber Pakhtunkhwa and Balochistan, with three killed in Lakki Marwat district, 10 killed in Bannu district and 13 killed in North Waziristan as well as eight killed in Zhob district. A police constable was killed in a militant attack in Wana while six police personnel including a DSP were killed and three were wounded in an insurgent ambush in Kohat District. An ex-Police officer and a militant were killed while another militant was injured in an engagement in Peshawar District.

On 25 February, local sources reported that further skirmishes took place in Maqbal area in Dand Aw Patan District of Paktia province between Taliban and Pakistani forces. Light clashes took place in Mohmand and Kurram Districts whereas heavy fighting occurred in Khyber District between Pakistani security forces and Pakistani Taliban. Pakistani military claimed to have killed 10 TTP militants in a follow-up operation in Zhob District. Unidentified militants attacked a police patrol in Bajaur killing four and wounding two police personnel and also killed a constable and his son in South Waziristan.

On 26 February, at around 20:00 local time (15:30 GMT), Taliban-led Afghanistan's officials announced the launch of what they described as a "retaliatory operation", directed by Defence Minister Mullah Yaqoob and Army Chief Fasihuddin Fitrat, along the border in the provinces of Nangarhar, Nuristan, Kunar, Khost, Paktia, and Paktika. As per the Taliban officials, 55 Pakistani soldiers were killed, and several others were captured. Taliban-led Afghanistan's officials further added that one military headquarters and 19 border outposts had been captured, while 4 border outposts were destroyed during the operation. Zabihullah Mujahid named seven of the border outposts that Taliban officials claimed to have captured. According to reports, the outposts were located inside Afghanistan, and it remained unclear how border outposts belonging to Pakistani forces were located on Afghan soil. At midnight local time (19:30 GMT), the Taliban-led Afghan Ministry of Defense announced the end of its four-hour operation. Pakistani officials rejected Taliban claims and stated that military action against Taliban forces was continuing. They further added that the attack had been repulsed, that the Taliban had suffered heavy losses, and that two Pakistani soldiers had been killed and three others were injured during the four-hour engagement.

In response to the Taliban's operation, Pakistan carried out air and ground strikes against Afghan Taliban positions in Kabul, Kandahar, Paktia, and Nangarhar. Faisal Karim Kundi, governor of Khyber Pakhtunkhwa, stated that the Afghan Taliban started the war and Pakistan will be the one to end it, while Khawaja Asif, Pakistan's defence minister, announced the start of an "open war" between the two countries. Pakistani officials stated that around 133 Taliban fighters were killed and more than 200 were injured during the clashes and subsequent operation. They further added that the airstrikes destroyed two corps headquarters, three brigade headquarters, two ammunition depots, one logistics base, three battalion headquarters, two sector headquarters, and more than 80 tanks, artillery pieces, and APCs (armoured personnel carriers). Pakistani officials also said that 27 border posts held by Taliban forces were destroyed and nine were captured. Taliban spokesperson Zabihullah Mujahid confirmed airstrikes in Kabul, Kandahar, Paktia, and several other locations, and stated that these airstrikes did not cause any casualties. The Taliban spokesperson also announced on X (formerly Twitter) that Taliban forces had responded to the airstrikes with attacks against Pakistani military positions in Kandahar and Helmand, two provinces in Afghanistan, although the post was later deleted.

In Kabul, residents reported that airstrikes struck an ammunition depot near Darulaman, triggering hours of secondary explosions that rattled homes across the capital. Residents also reported hearing the sound of many ambulance sirens following the airstrike on the ammunition depot. Satellite images reviewed by The New York Times (NYT) confirmed an airstrike on an ammunition depot in Kabul. Additionally, satellite imagery released by Planet Labs revealed damage at two locations in Kabul, which are 400 meters apart. In Gardez, scorch marks and damage to four buildings at a military base belonging to Taliban forces were visible from satellite imagery. Furthermore, NASA gathered and published data indicating a significant heat signature at the military base, suggesting that a sizeable fire had erupted at the site overnight. In Kandahar, Pakistani officials released aerial footage of a large explosion at an ammunition depot near Kandahar International Airport (KDH). BBC News, using satellite imagery, confirmed the location of an ammunition depot in Kandahar. In Paktika, a video shared on social media showed smoke rising from a Taliban military base in the Urgun District. BBC News confirmed the location by matching roads and a distinctive foreground building with satellite imagery. Analysts at Maiar, an intelligence firm, stated that Pakistan's strikes on buildings and other infrastructure in Afghanistan appeared to be largely confined to military sites. They said that one of the buildings struck in Kabul appeared to be a military headquarters or command-and-control centre, and that vehicles parked nearby suggested the building had been occupied. In Kandahar, the analysts reported damage to at least two buildings within a large complex, which they assessed to be a headquarters of some kind.

PAF airstrikes in Kandahar province also struck the former home of Mullah Omar, the late founder of the Taliban, which was currently serving as a base for the Taliban's suicide unit. The property is located about one kilometer from the residence of the current Taliban leader, Hibatullah Akhundzada. According to local Afghan sources, about 15 Taliban members were killed in the strike. Elsewhere in the province, parts of Spin Boldak District were also struck. Additionally, Taliban forces' facility in Pul-e-Charkhi was also struck by the PAF. Following Pakistan's airstrikes on Kabul and Kandahar, Zabihullah Mujahid stated that the Taliban were ready to negotiate with Pakistan.

On 27 February, the PAF carried out airstrikes in parts of Paktika and Laghman provinces, according to local Afghan sources. The airstrike in Laghman targeted the 201 Khalid Ibn Walid Corps, while the one in Paktika struck a house. However, according to some Afghan sources, the Taliban-led Afghan armed forces base in Paktika was the one that was struck by the PAF. Afghan local sources also report an airstrike on the Taliban-led Afghan border brigade in Paktika province. Later the same day, at around noon, the Taliban-led Afghan border brigade in Gardez was also struck by an airstrike carried out by the PAF. An additional airstrike in parts of Nangarhar was also reported by local Afghan sources. The Taliban-led Afghan armed forces base in Khost Province was also struck in the airstrikes that were carried out on 27 February.

On the same day, the Taliban-led Afghan Ministry of Defense announced that it had carried out airstrikes in Pakistan targeting military sites in Faizabad, Nowshera, Jamrud, and Abbottabad. The ministry did not provide details about the type of aircraft or equipment allegedly used in the attacks. Pakistani officials, however, stated that attempts to strike in Abbottabad, Swabi, and Nowshera using small drones had been foiled using anti-drone systems. They denied that any strike had taken place in Faizabad or Jamrud, and said that these attacks were the work of the Pakistani Taliban rather than the Afghan Taliban. The drone in Swabi crashed near a girls' school, injuring a student. A quadcopter attack on a mosque in Bannu injured five worshippers. Pakistan subsequently imposed a countrywide ban on drone flights. A Pakistani soldier was killed in a drone attack on a check post in Tank District. A school was destroyed in a drone strike in North Waziristan while a 200kg+ missile exploded in an open space near a military installation in Mirali, causing no casualties. Pakistani forces foiled coordinated militant attacks on police posts in Bannu, Hangu and Peshawar districts. A constable and a civilian were injured in the attack in Peshawar.

During the same day, Pakistan's army spokesperson stated that Operation Ghazab Lil Haq was continuing successfully against the Afghan Taliban. He said Pakistani forces had repulsed insurgents at 53 border locations, killing 274 militants, injuring more than 400. He added that 73 Afghan Taliban posts had been destroyed, 18 had been captured, and 115 tanks and armoured vehicles had also been destroyed. He also said Pakistani forces had targeted militant infrastructure at 22 locations in Kandahar, Paktia, Nangarhar, Khost, and Paktika. He added that 12 Pakistani soldiers were killed, 27 were wounded, and one is missing in action. Pakistani officials also released videos of their strikes in Afghanistan.

Later that day, Afghan Taliban officials announced that they had launched a new wave of attacks against Pakistani border guards in the border areas of Khost and Paktia provinces. The fighting later spread to the border areas of Kunar and Nangarhar provinces. The same day, Pakistani Taliban leader Noor Wali Mehsud ordered the group's fighters to intensify and systematically carry out attacks in support of the Afghan Taliban. He also instructed them to post video evidence of their attacks directly on social media without prior permission. Jamaat ul Ahrar, an offshoot of the Pakistani Taliban, also ordered its fighters to intensify attacks in Pakistan in response to Pakistani airstrikes against the Afghan Taliban. It also said that its fighters would step up attacks in the provinces of Sindh and Punjab. Following these orders, militant attacks on police stations and outposts were reported in Peshawar, Bannu, Hangu, and Mattani, injuring a police officer and a civilian.

=== Second week (28 February – 6 March) ===
On 28 February, clashes between Pakistan border guards and Afghan Taliban were reported along the border areas of Torkham. Later on, an airstrike was carried out by the PAF on Jalalabad Airport, the capital of Nangarhar province. An AFP journalist reported hearing sounds of two loud explosions from the direction of Jalalabad airport. Pakistan's media outlet also reported an airstrike in Nangarhar province targeting several Taliban headquarters. On the same day, Afghan forces claimed a Pakistani fighter was shot down over Jalalabad using anti-aircraft guns, with the pilot captured alive. Pakistan rejected the Afghan Taliban's claim, labeling it as wartime propaganda. Afterwards, the detained individual was severely beaten by the Afghan Taliban and locals, while being paraded through the market area in Jalalabad, with Taliban officials terming the event as an important war operation. However, later on, it was revealed that the pilot that Afghan forces captured was an ordinary Afghan national who was a parachutist and had no connection to the Pakistani army. Further investigation also revealed that news of downing a fighter jet was false, and the detained individual was later released.

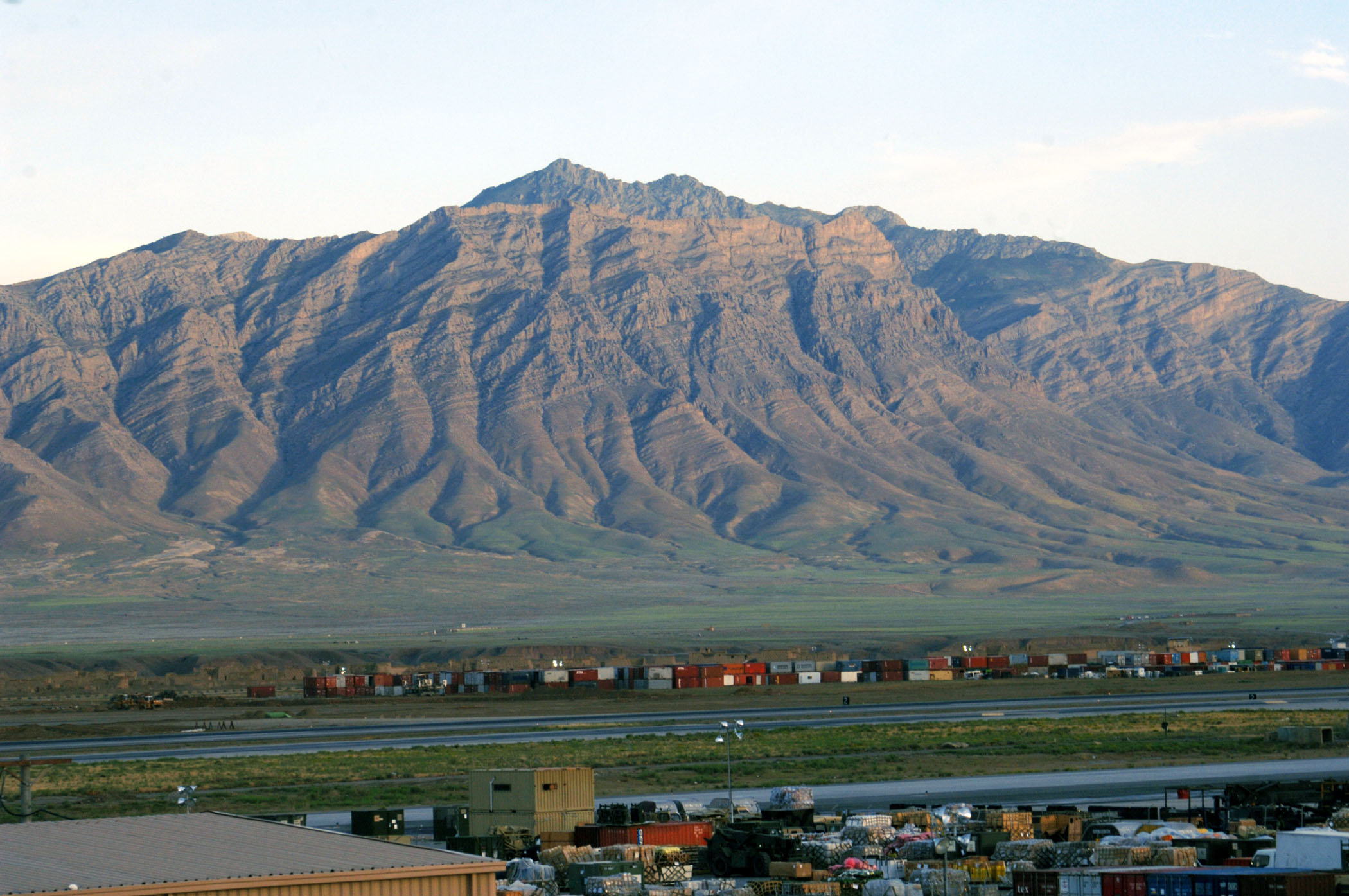
Bagram Airfield pictured in 2007

Elsewhere, the PAF carried out airstrikes in parts of Khost, Kandahar provinces, and Kabul. Taliban-led Afghan government deputy spokesperson Hamdullah Fitrat said that 52 people had been killed and 66 others injured as a result of Pakistani attacks on the provinces of Paktika, Khost, Kunar, Nangarhar, and Kandahar. The Taliban-led Afghan Ministry of Defense said that 110 Pakistani soldiers had been killed and 27 Pakistani border posts had been captured. The ministry also said that it had attacked Pakistani military sites in Miranshah and Spinwam, though Pakistani officials denied that any such attack had taken place. On the same day, an attack by Pakistani Taliban on Sra Khawra police checkpost in Khyber Pakhtunkhwa injured one policeman and 6 civilians.

Separately, Pakistani officials said that 352 Afghan Taliban members had been killed and more than 535 wounded since the fighting began. They added that Pakistani forces had destroyed 130 Taliban border posts, captured 26 others, and destroyed 171 tanks and armoured personnel carriers belonging to Afghan Taliban forces. The officials also said that the PAF had targeted 41 locations in Afghanistan, including brigade and battalion headquarters in Nangarhar province and an army headquarters in Kandahar province. Later on the day, clashes resumed between Pakistan border guards and Afghan Taliban forces along the border areas of Nangarhar, Khost, and Paktia provinces. Taliban-led Afghan armed forces' 203rd Mansouri Corps in Paktia released a video depicting fresh forces being dispatched to areas near the border.

On 1 March, the PAF conducted airstrikes in Kabul with locals reporting hearing sounds of explosions and gunfire in several parts of Kabul, including Darulaman, and areas near the airport and Kārte Naw. According to residents, Pakistani fighter aircraft began patrolling and conducting intermittent strikes at about 20:30 local time on 28 February; explosions and gunfire were reported until about 06:00 the following morning. Residents also report hearing sound of explosions and gunfire around Shash Darak neighborhood. Shash Darak is home to several Afghan government and intelligence facilities, including Directorate 40 of the Taliban's intelligence service and offices of the Urban Development Ministry. Afghanistan's Ministry of Defense said that air-defense fire had been directed at Pakistani aircraft over Kabul and advised residents not to be alarmed. Later that day, the PAF carried out airstrikes on Bagram Airfield. According to local Afghan sources, the airstrikes were carried out by at least three aircraft, with several explosions being heard. Taliban officials claimed Pakistan's fighter jets attempted to bomb the base but were repelled by anti-aircraft fire and that no damage was sustained. However, satellite imagery published by The New York Times showed a hangar and two warehouses at the base had been destroyed. Pakistani officials later confirmed the strike on Bagram and said it also destroyed military supplies and an unknown number of Black Hawks, C-130 and Super Tucanos on the airfield. Taliban claimed that three people including a woman were killed by Pakistani airstrikes in Nangarhar and Paktia.

On the same day, armed clashes broke out between Taliban and Pakistan border guards along the Torkham border crossing. Afghanistan's Ministry of Defense said that clashes in border areas of Nangarhar, Paktia, Khost, and Kandahar provinces killed 32 Pakistani soldiers and wounded dozens more. The ministry did not provide figures for casualties among Taliban forces. The ministry also said it had carried out airstrikes on Pakistan's military sites in Khyber Pakhtunkhwa and Balochistan, without specifying the type of aircraft or aerial equipment used. Pakistan's Ministry of Information and Broadcasting rejected the claim and described it as false, stating that no evidence such as satellite imagery, flight data, ground footage, or eyewitness accounts had been provided to substantiate it. In Pakistan's Mohmand District, a drone crashed at Governor Model High School, causing no casualties or significant structural damage. Following the incident, Pakistani officials temporarily closed a number schools close to the border areas. Four civilians were wounded in Chitral District as a result of cross-border fire from Afghanistan.

Later that day, Pakistani officials said that Operation Ghazab lil-Haq was ongoing and that, since the start of hostilities, 415 Afghan Taliban fighters had been killed and more than 580 wounded. According to the officials, Pakistan's forces had destroyed 182 Taliban posts, captured 31 others, and disabled 185 tanks and armoured personnel carriers. The officials further add that the PAF conducted airstrikes at 46 locations inside Afghanistan. The officials also released footage that they said showed Pakistani troops crossing into Afghanistan from North Waziristan and capturing a border outpost belonging to Afghan Taliban. Elsewhere, Pakistan's security forces claimed to have taken control of 32 square kilometres (12 sq mi) of strategic Afghan territory south of the Zhob sector. This strategic territory, near the Kandahar Province, is known as the Ghudwana enclave.

At night, local resident in Herat province said that fighter jets were patrolling the skies of the province. In Islam Qala, residents reported hearing two explosions as aircraft flew over. At the same time, armed clashes resumed between Taliban and Pakistan border guards along the border area of Angoor Adda.

On 2 March, the PAF conducted airstrikes in Kabul which were confirmed by Taliban officials. According to Afghan local sources, the PAF also carried out airstrikes in parts of Panjshir, Kapisa, and Nangarhar provinces. In the provinces of Panjshir and Kapisa, local sources reported that, for the third consecutive night, they had heard aircraft, explosions, and ground-to-air gunfire. According to residents, scattered gunfire was also heard in the area known as Darband Mountain, which connects Panjshir, Kapisa, and Parwan. While in Nangarhar province, Pakistan's warplane bombed a Taliban-led Afghan armed forces' border brigade near the provincial capital Jalalabad. No detail was released about the possible casualty and Taliban officials did not comment on the matter.

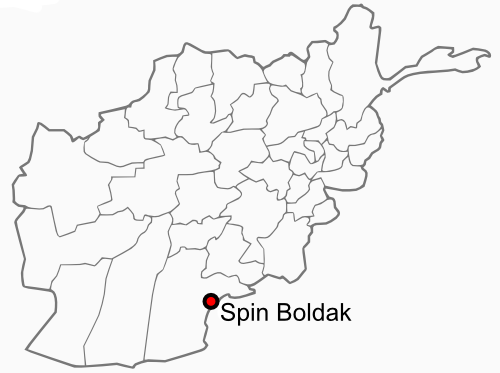
Spin Boldak in southern Afghanistan was the site of repeated clashes between Afghan and Pakistani forces

On the same day, Pakistani officials stated that, since the start of hostilities, 435 Afghan Taliban fighters had been killed and more than 630 others had been injured. They added that 188 tanks and armoured vehicles had been destroyed, 31 Afghan military posts had been captured, and 51 locations across Afghanistan had been targeted in air strikes. Pakistani security sources also told Reuters that Pakistan's forces had destroyed ammunition depots in Khost and Jalalabad, as well as a drone storage site in Jalalabad, among other targets. Pakistani officials stated that they were in no hurry to end Operation Ghazab Lil Haq, and that attacks inside Afghanistan would continue until Taliban officials provided credible guarantees that they were taking action to prevent the activities of the TTP in Afghanistan. In Landi Kotal, an artillery shell fired by Taliban forces fell near a residential compound, injuring 4 civilians. Elsewhere, fighting resumed along the border areas of Afghanistan's Spin Boldak and Pakistan's Mohmand districts. Two Pakistani soldiers were injured in a drone attack in Dera Ismail Khan District. A police constable was killed in a militant attack in Tank District and another in Mardan District. Police also claimed to have foiled militant raids in Peshawar and Khyber Districts.

On 3 March, the PAF conducted airstrikes in parts of Panjshir, Kabul, Badakhshan, Herat, and Kapisa. Residents of Kabul reported that the city had been subjected to daily airstrikes over the past six days. In Panjshir, residents reported hearing a loud explosion, and said that the Bazarak area was shaken by a strong tremor. In Herat, residents stated that fighter jets were patrolling over the city's airport and that gunfire was heard from the airport. In Badakhshan, residents reported that an airstrike had taken place in Fayzabad. Taliban officials did not release any official details regarding these airstrikes. A PAF airstrike was also reported in Afghanistan's Nuristan province.

On the same day, a spokesperson for the Taliban-led Afghan government stated that, in the past 24 hours Taliban forces had attacked Pakistan's border outposts along the provinces of Kandahar, Nangarhar, Kunar, Nuristan, Khost, Paktika and Paktika. According to the spokesperson, since the start of the hostilities, Taliban forces had killed more than 150 Pakistan's troops, injured 200 others, and destroyed 40 border outposts belonging to Pakistan. Afghan MoD claimed that three Pakistani personnel were killed and one was captured in an attack on Pakistani forces in Spin Boldak. The spokesperson also stated that 28 Taliban fighters had been killed in the clashes, while 42 others had been wounded. As per the spokesperson, 110 Afghan civilians had been killed, while 120 others had been wounded. The spokesperson added that Pakistani attacks in Afghanistan have damaged public facilities, mosques, and houses. The spokesperson also said that Afghanistan has approached Russia, China, the European Union, and United Kingdom to help end the war. The spokesperson warned that as long as Pakistan's attacks inside Afghanistan will continue, Taliban forces will keep on responding. A spokesperson for Taliban-led Afghan Ministry of Defense said that Taliban forces has the ability to block Pakistan's air operations inside Afghanistan.

United Nations Assistance Mission in Afghanistan (UNAMA) announced that at least 42 civilians were killed and 104 others injured in Afghanistan in six days of fighting between the Taliban and Pakistan. The figure include casualties caused by indirect fire during cross-border fighting that struck residential areas in provinces of Paktia, Paktika, Nangarhar, Kunar and Khost, as well as airstrikes in Paktika and Nangarhar. UNAMA urged both countries to halt the clashes, to comply with international law, including international humanitarian law, and to protect civilians.

Pakistani officials claimed that since the start of hostilities, 464 Afghan Taliban personnel had been killed and more than 665 others had been injured. They added that 188 checkposts had been destroyed, 31 posts captured, 192 tanks, armoured vehicles, and artillery pieces destroyed, and 56 locations across Afghanistan targeted in air strikes. Pakistani officials also said that they had carried out intelligence based operation Bannu district against Pakistani Taliban, injuring multiple militants. In Lakki Marwat district, a Pakistani Taliban commander was killed by Pakistani forces, while in Tank district, a Pakistani police constable was shot dead by militants.

Elsewhere, armed clashes between Taliban and Pakistan's border guards resumed along the border areas of Khost, Kunar, and Zabul provinces. According to Afghan local sources, clashes in Zabul province caused casualties among Taliban forces and destroyed several border outposts belonging to Taliban forces. In Torkham Border Crossing area, Pakistan officials state that they foiled an infiltration bid and killed an Afghan Taliban commander, identified as Qahraman, along with several of his associates. Pakistan claimed to have killed 67 Talban fighters as they attempted attempted assaults at 16 different locations in northern Balochistan, 27 were killed and several others wounded meanwhile a Frontier Corps soldier was killed and five were injured. 40 more Taliban fighters were killed in an attempted assault in KP.

On 4 March, armed clashes between Taliban forces and Pakistani border guards continued in the border areas of Zabul, Kandahar, Khost, and Kunar provinces. An Afghan media outlet quoting local sources in several provinces report that many of the Pakistani strikes in recent days appeared to have targeted Taliban military facilities. They also reported that, over the previous week, the military corps of the Taliban-led Afghan armed forces in Nangarhar province had been struck by the PAF. On the same day, the PAF carried out multiple airstrikes in Kandahar targeting the Taliban-led Afghan armed forces' air brigade, the third battalion of the border police, and the 205 Al-Badr Corps. Taliban officials had not commented on the reports of airstrikes on military sites in Kandahar province. Pakistani troops attacked and destroyed Taliban border checkpoints in Zabul Province inflicting losses. Taliban authorities claimed that Pakistani conducted mortar strikes into Samkani district in Paktia province and artillery into Kunar with 82 shells hitting Sarkano District, 15 striking Dangam District and four in Shultan District. The Taliban claimed that one child was wounded and several residential properties were damaged, elsewhere, skirmishes in Kamdesh district of Nuristan killed two civilians, a mortar strike in Khost wounded a child and a civilian was killed and another wounded in skirmishes in Shkin District of Paktika Province. A policeman was killed in a militant sniper attack in Bajaur. A cylinder bomb attack on Miranshah camp killed two government officials.

The Norwegian Refugee Council reported that a Pakistani artillery attack on an earthquake-affected refugee camp in Khas Kunar District, Kunar province, resulted in three people being killed and seven others being injured, while forcing 650 families from the camp to flee to safety.

An Afghan media outlet reported that the Taliban were forcibly recruiting and deploying fighters, including civilians, from northern and northeastern Afghanistan to front lines along the Pakistan border, sometimes using financial incentives. It said that many were sent without their families' consent, causing concern among residents. The outlet also reported that the Taliban had restricted access to information from war zones while conducting propaganda campaigns and organizing anti-Pakistan protests in northern provinces, which saw limited public participation. It further reported that the Taliban had recently detained two brothers from Parwan province following their expulsion from Pakistan, and told their family that they would be required to fight in the war against Pakistan. According to the report, the two were separated from their parents at the Torkham Border Crossing, and their family had been unable to prevent their forced recruitment. The outlet said the case reflected broader difficulties faced by deported Afghan refugees, including insecurity, lack of legal support, and the risk of forced conscription.

On the same day, Taliban-led Afghan Ministry of Defense announced that they have shot down two surveillance drones of Pakistani forces in Nangarhar and Kandahar provinces. Pakistani officials state that since the start of hostilities, 481 Afghan Taliban operatives had been killed and more than 696 others injured. They also said that 226 border outpost of Taliban forces had been destroyed and 35 others captured by Pakistani security forces. In addition, they stated that 198 tanks, armoured vehicles, and artillery pieces had been destroyed, and that 56 locations across Afghanistan had been targeted in air strikes. Elsewhere, armed clashes once again resumed in Nangarhar province between Taliban forces and Pakistani border guards.

On 5 March, armed clashes were reported between Taliban forces and Pakistani border guards in parts of Khost, Paktia, Paktika, Kunar, Nangarhar and Kandahar provinces. The clashes were described as sporadic exchanges of fire along sections of the Afghanistan–Pakistan border. In the Spin Boldak district of Kandahar, local sources reported that four Afghan civilians had been killed in strikes by Pakistani forces. Taliban officials have not confirmed the casualties in Spin Boldak district. In Kabul, residents report hearing sounds of scattered gunfire in parts of the city. In Pakistan's Miranshah, two civilians were killed and one was injured when a missile fired from an unidentified direction struck the Governor Cottage in Cantonment area. In Mohmand district, three civilians were injured when a mortar shell fired by Afghan forces landed on a house. Pakistan claimed to have killed 12 TTP insurgents in an operation in Harnai District.

The same day, Taliban-led Afghanistan's Ministry of Defense said that over the past 24 hours, 41 Pakistani soldiers had been killed and 53 others had been wounded in the clashes with Taliban forces. The Ministry added that the Taliban forces had destroyed 12 military post and shot down three reconnaissance drones of Pakistan over the past day. The Ministry also said that they have carried out airstrike on a military base in Pakistan province of Balochistan. Pakistani officials stated that they targeted 41 border outpost belonging to Afghan Taliban forces and Pakistani Taliban, resulting in heavy casualties and material losses. Pakistani officials also added that they had destroyed an ammunition depot and headquarters of 205 Corps brigade headquarters in Kandahar.

According to Afghan local sources, Taliban were moving tanks, military equipment, and weapons from Takhar and Badakhshan to Kabul amid the conflict with Pakistan. They further add that outposts and checkpoints in parts of northern Afghanistan had been evacuated following the redeployment of Taliban forces from these areas to border regions. UN High Commissioner for Refugees (UNHCR) state that an estimated 115,000 people in Afghanistan and around 3,000 people in Pakistan have been displaced as result of border clashes. Afghans in several cities sent pictures and messages to an Afghan media outlet saying that they were threatened and forced by Taliban to participate in demonstration against Pakistan. Some Afghans in Bamyan province said local businessmen were warned that if they did not participate in the protests, "their shops would be sealed."

On 6 March, armed clashes resumed along the border between Taliban forces and Pakistani border guards. Taliban officials said that they had launched an attack on Kharlachi border crossing in Dandpatan district of Paktia province, while sharing pictures of their attack. The Taliban-led Afghan Ministry of Defense said, over the previous 24 hours, Taliban forces had attacked 28 locations in the border areas of Kandahar, Nangarhar, Kunar, Khost, Paktia, and Paktika provinces, killing 109 Pakistani soldiers and injuring 148 others. The ministry added that 10 military vehicles and two drones of Pakistani forces were also destroyed, while three Taliban soldiers were killed and nine others were wounded during the same duration. The ministry also said that seven civilians were killed and 13 other were injured as a result of Pakistani attacks in Afghanistan. The ministry added that, since the start of the conflict, Taliban forces had captured and later destroyed 64 Pakistan Army check posts and seven bases, killing 307 Pakistani soldiers and injuring more than 350 others. Meanwhile, Pakistani officials stated that since the start of conflict, 527 Taliban forces were killed and 755 others were injured. Pakistani officials added that Pakistani attacks had targeted 62 locations across Afghanistan, while Pakistani forces had destroyed 237 Taliban outposts, captured 38 Taliban strongholds, and destroyed 205 Taliban tanks, armored vehicles, and artillery pieces. A Taliban spokesman said that three people were killed and three were wounded in Pakistani strikes on Paktika Province and destroyed 10 houses, 14 shops, two markets, and a mosque. In Pakistan's Mohmand District, several people were injured when mortar shells fired by Taliban forces landed in a village. UNAMA reported that from 26 February to 5 March, 56 civilians were killed and 129 others were injured in Afghanistan as result of armed clashes between Pakistan and the Taliban. UNAMA also urged both sides to take urgent measures to protect civilians. A person was killed and 19 others, including two military personnel were injured in a suicide VBIED attack by Hafiz Gul Bahadur Group on the Bannu–Miranshah road. Pakistani Police forces neutralized two IEDs with 140+ kilograms and an 8kg explosive device in Bannu District.

On the same day, some tribal elders and former military personnel in Afghanistan's border provinces said that the Taliban had asked them to support its conflict with Pakistan and to organize public protests against the country. According to them, as tensions between the Taliban and Pakistan continued, Taliban officials in Khost, Paktika, Paktia, and Nangarhar provinces reportedly held meetings with tribal elders and influential figures to encourage participation in protests against Pakistan. Some tribal elders described the outreach as unusual, saying they had not been invited to official meetings since the Taliban returned to power. Taliban officials in Kabul were also said to have asked former Afghan government officials and former members of the House of Representatives to publicly support the Taliban in its war with Pakistan. Former Afghan soldiers in Paktika and Khost provinces also state that the Taliban were seeking out and forcibly taking ex-soldiers, particularly those trained to operate heavy weapons such as mortars and artillery, to border areas to assist in the conflict. Afghan news outlet reported that Taliban forces people in Badakhshan province to raise anti-Pakistan slogans.

Afghan local sources in Panjshir said the Taliban were moving heavy military equipment, including weapons and vehicles, into mountainous areas to protect them from potential Pakistani airstrikes. Local sources in Bamyan, sharing a photo of a helicopter that had landed in a civilian area of Bamyan airport near residential homes, said the Taliban had also hidden Black Hawk helicopters, armoured vehicles and heavy weapons in different parts of Bamyan. The sources expressed concern that these actions were endangering civilians.

=== Third week (7–13 March) ===
On 7 March, Pakistani officials stated that they had carried out air strikes along the Pakistan-Afghanistan border, destroying several Afghan Taliban positions. The officials added the airstrikes inflicted heavy casualties on the Taliban forces, forcing them to abandon and flee from those positions. Meanwhile, Taliban officials said that Pakistani forces had bombed the provinces of Paktia, Paktika, Khost, Maidan Wardak, and Kunar, resulting in civilian casualties and damage to homes and shops. Taliban officials did not comment on the casualties suffered by their forces. Taliban officials also urged the United Nations Security Council (UNSC) to take action to stop Pakistan's attacks. They cited recent strikes on several Afghan provinces, civilian casualties, displacement, and the expulsion and harassment of Afghan refugees in Pakistan, and called on the UNSC to help end the situation. Taliban officials in Torkham border crossing area said that Pakistan's attacks have destroyed at least 150 shops, resulting heavy financial losses for Afghan business owners. In Nangarhar province, residents state that the Taliban had forced them to participate in a protest against Pakistan in Jalalabad, in some cases by offering cash payments. Three Policemen were killed and 31 people including five Policemen and 26 civilians were wounded in an IED attack targeting a police patrol in Wana. A drone attack on relatives of police peace committee killed two and wounded seven in Lakki Marwat District while a bomb blast killed two more civilians and wounded ten.

On 8 March, Pakistani officials stated that since the start of hostilities, 583 Afghan Taliban operatives had been killed and more than 795 injured. They added that Pakistani forces had destroyed 242 check-posts, captured 38 others, destroyed 213 tanks, armored vehicles, and artillery guns, and targeted 64 locations across Afghanistan in air strikes. Pakistani officials also said that they foiled an infiltration attempt along the Pakistan–Afghanistan border near the Chaman sector, killing one Taliban soldier while others fled the area. Elsewhere, Pakistani security forces carried out intelligence-based operation in five districts of the country, killing 13 Pakistani Taliban militants. In Pakistan's North Waziristan, two civilians were killed and three others were injured when a mortar shell fired by Taliban forces landed in a village. A child was killed and his 11 family members were wounded in a quadcopter strike in South Waziristan. Meanwhile, Taliban officials said that they shot a reconnaissance drone belonging to Pakistani forces in Nangarhar province. Two militants were killed in a Pakistani precision airstrike in Bannu District.

In Kunar province, residents stated that the Taliban had forced them to participate in a protest march against Pakistan in Asadabad on 7 March. According to them, Taliban authorities instructed each tribal elder to bring at least five people to the protest. On the same day, China's special representative for Afghanistan, Yu Xiaoyong, told Taliban Foreign Minister Amir Khan Muttaqi that China had contacted Pakistan and was working to reduce tensions between the Taliban and Pakistan.

On 9 March, Taliban officials said that they had destroyed a border outpost of Pakistani forces in the Goshta District of Nangarhar province. On the same day, Pakistani officials stated that their ground forces had destroyed an Afghan Taliban border outpost along the border, while the PAF destroyed an ammunition depot at Shaheen Base in Paktika province. On the same day, Pakistan's Information Minister said that Pakistan's military operations inside Afghanistan were aimed at militant hideouts and did not target civilian areas. He said the strikes were based on precise intelligence, dismissed casualty figures released by the Taliban as fabricated, and argued that United Nations reports of civilian casualties relied largely on information provided by the Taliban administration.

On 10 March, Pakistani officials stated that they had destroyed important posts and centers of Taliban forces in the Arandu and Kurram sectors, forcing them to abandon their positions. Taliban officials said that Pakistani forces had carried out strikes in parts of Paktika, Paktia, Khost, and Nuristan provinces, killing three civilians and injuring three others. In Pakistan's Mohmand district, Pakistani Taliban militants clashed with police, resulting in no casualties on either side. A soldier was killed and eight injured in a militant attack in Kurram District. Two rockets targeted Bannu Cantonment with one hitting a Circuit House and the other landing near a mosque.

On 11 March, Pakistani officials stated that they had targeted two Taliban border outposts along the border in Zhob sector, forcing Taliban fighters to abandon their positions and seizing several weapons, including Russian-made 73 mm HGL-9 heavy grenade launchers. In border areas adjacent to Shawal in North Waziristan, Pakistani officials stated that they had targeted and destroyed another Taliban border outpost. Pakistani officials also said that since the onset of hostilities, at least 641 Afghan Taliban operatives had been killed and more than 855 injured. According to them, Pakistani forces had destroyed 243 check posts, captured and subsequently destroyed 42 more, destroyed 219 tanks, armored vehicles and artillery guns, and carried out air strikes on 65 locations across Afghanistan. Chinese Foreign Minister Wang Yi, during a telephone conversation with his Pakistani counterpart, said that China resolutely supported Pakistan's fight against terrorism. He added that Chinese officials were working with Taliban and Pakistani officials to find a path toward reconciliation. On the same day, an Afghan media outlet reported that Taliban were looking for a mediator to help end the conflict with Pakistan. Later that day, local sources report that Pakistani forces carried out artillery attacks in parts of Khost province. Taliban officials confirmed the attacks but said that the attacks injured 2 Afghan civilians and destroyed a number of houses.

On 12 March, Pakistani officials stated that their military forces targeted and destroyed several Taliban border outposts along the border. Pakistani officials also released images of their attacks which appeared to show multiple posts being hit by air strikes. However, Taliban officials said that Pakistani forces shelled parts of Khost and Kunar provinces, killing four civilians and injuring three others. Taliban claimed to have conducted drone strikes on a Pakistani fort and a command center in Kohat, claiming to have inflicted casualties.

On 13 March, the PAF launched multiple airstrikes targeting areas in Kabul, Kandahar, Paktia, and Paktika. Taliban spokesman said that Pakistan's airstrike caused civilian casualties and destroyed a fuel depot of the Kam Air airline. Pakistani officials denied Taliban's spokesman allegations and stated that PAF targeted Taliban military sites and infrastructure in the provinces of Kabul, Kandahar and Paktia. They said the strikes hit facilities linked to 313 Corps and an ammunition depot in Kabul, the Tarawo training center and logistical infrastructure, including a fuel depot, in Kandahar, and the Sher-e-Nau militant camp in Paktia. Pakistani officials also stated that since the start of conflict, at least 663 Afghan Taliban operatives had been killed and more than 887 injured. According to them, Pakistani forces had destroyed 249 check posts, captured 44 more, destroyed 224 tanks, armored vehicles and artillery guns, and carried out air strikes on 70 locations across Afghanistan. On the same day, Taliban-run Afghan Ministry of Defense said that they launched drones attack targeting military sites in Kohat, claiming to have inflicted significant losses. Later on, the ministry said that it had used two drones to strike a military facility near Islamabad. Pakistani officials denied the Taliban officials' claims and said that rudimentary drones had been intercepted and shot down in Kohat and Islamabad, injuring two civilians. They attributed the attacks to the Pakistani Taliban. In Pakistan's provincial capital of Quetta, two civilians were injured as result of falling debris from an intercepted drone, while in Lakki Marwat, six Pakistani police personnel were killed in a roadside bomb blast. The attack in Lakki Marwat was the deadliest in Pakistan since the onset of hostilities, although no group claimed responsibility for it.

=== Fourth week (14–18 March) ===
On 14 March, the Taliban-run Afghan Ministry of Defense said that Taliban forces had captured a Pakistani border outpost, killing 14 soldiers and injuring 11 others. The ministry also added that they destroyed an armored tank and a military vehicle of Pakistani forces. However, Pakistani officials denied allegations made by Afghan Ministry of Defense, terming them false, fabricated and aimed at misleading the Afghan public. According to Pakistani officials, the damages and losses suffered by the Afghan Taliban and the Pakistani Taliban were being regularly documented, with related video and photographic evidence shared with the media. Elsewhere, Pakistani security forces killed six Pakistani Taliban militants in Lakki Marwat. Later that day, Pakistani officials stated that the Pakistan Air Force had carried out airstrikes on five military bases in Kandahar, including the General Directorate of Intelligence (GDI), Haibatullah Akhundzada's special forces unit, the border command, a tunnel, and a Taliban technical equipment warehouse. Pakistani officials added that the targeted military sites had been destroyed and released videos and images of the strikes in Kandahar. Locals in Kandahar told an Agence France-Presse journalist that military aircraft had flown over a mountain housing a military facility before an explosion was heard. Afghan locals sources state that Pakistani airstrikes struck a Taliban special forces facility linked to Hibatullah Akhundzada, as well as an ammunition depot and a border command center in Kandahar Province. The special forces site, located near a compound associated with Mullah Omar, was described as one of Akhundzada's most trusted units. Afghan locals also reported an airstrike in Spin Boldak District, while armed clashes resumed between Taliban forces and Pakistani border guards in Khost. However, a Taliban spokesperson claimed that no one had been hurt in the airstrikes and that they had caused only limited damage to a drug rehabilitation centre and an empty container. A police constable was injured while repelling a militant attack on a police post in Dera Ismail Khan District.

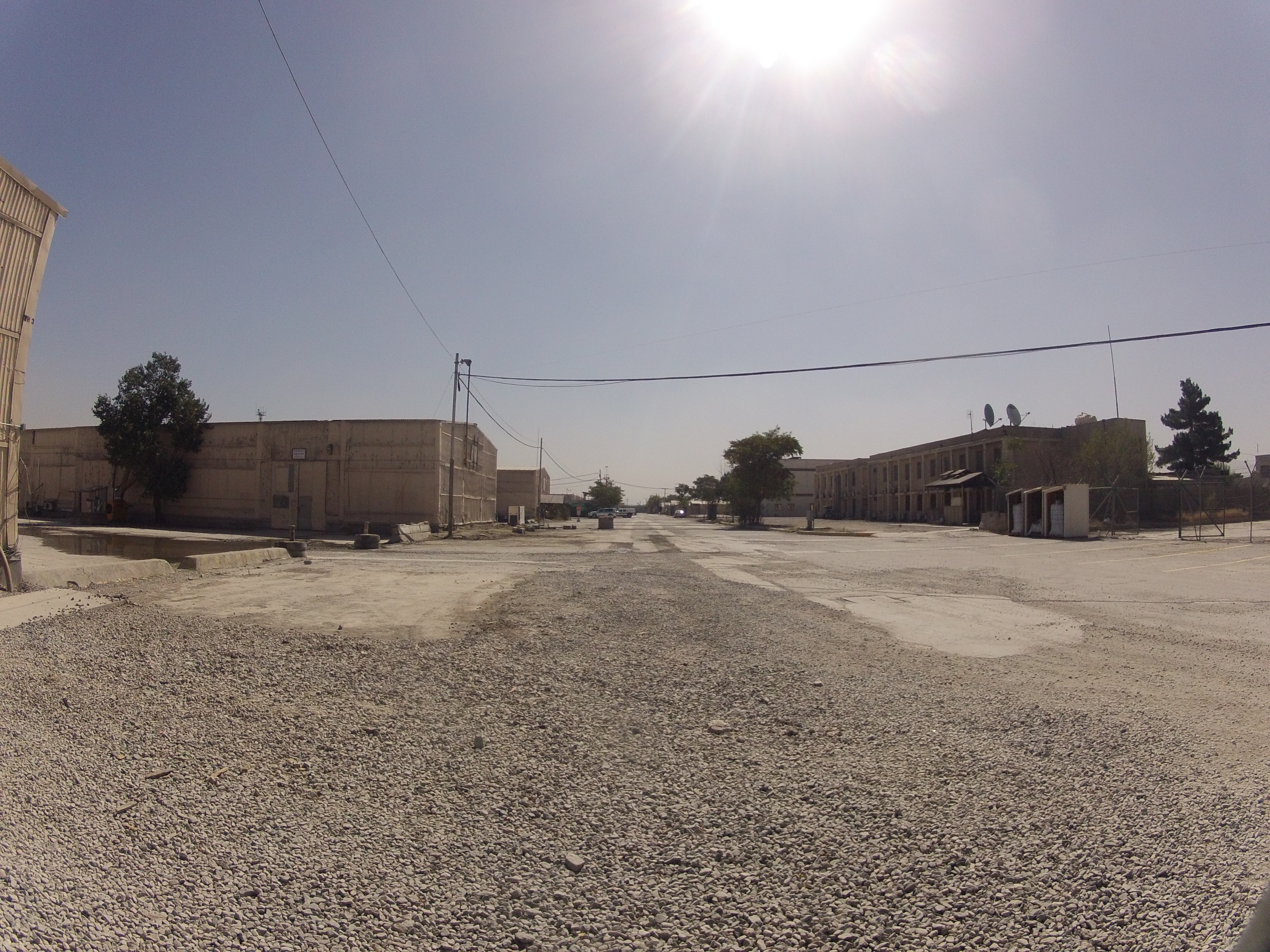
Camp Qargha, pictured here in 2014, was struck by Pakistan on 16 March

On 15 March, Pakistani officials said that Taliban forces fired mortars from across the border into Bajaur, killing four civilians and injuring a child. Taliban claimed that a civilian was killed in Pakistani artillery strikes on Nuristan Province. On the same day, Afghanistan's defence ministry claimed to have carried out an attack on an army camp in Pakistan's South Waziristan area in retaliation for the airstrikes, which allegedly destroyed most of the camp's command centre and other facilities, and inflicted heavy casualties. Pakistani officials termed Taliban claims as propaganda, saying that a small drone was struck down and that no military installation or infrastructure was hit. Pakistani officials stated that since the onset of hostilities, Pakistan's armed forces had killed 684 Afghan Taliban operatives and militants and injured more than 912 others. They added that the operation destroyed 252 posts, captured and destroyed 44 more, destroyed 229 tanks, armoured vehicles and artillery guns, and targeted 73 sites across Afghanistan. In Pakistan's Kohat district, Pakistani security forces killed 6 militants of Pakistani Taliban. In Afghanistan's Paktika province, Taliban officials said that they shot down a reconnaissance drone of Pakistani forces. Pakistani forces killed a senior TTP commander in Dera Ismail Khan District. Pakistani military also claimed to have killed five TTP militants in Lakki Marwat District. A police inspector Zareen Taj was wounded in a militant attack in Peshawar District and two security personnel were kidnapped from Tank District.

On 16 March, Pakistan said that its forces launched multiple airstrikes against Taliban military installations in Kabul and Nangarhar, and claimed that it destroyed ammo storages and "technical support infrastructure". Taliban claimed that Pakistani strikes on Khost province killed four civilians and wounded nine, and destroyed civilian infrastructure in Kunar and Paktika province with 43 rounds being fired into Shkin district. A militant attack on a police post in Bannu District was repulsed by police forces.

Following the strikes, Afghanistan claimed that a Pakistani airstrike struck the Omid Addiction Treatment Hospital in Kabul, reportedly killing over 200 people, mostly drug addicts undergoing treatment at the drug rehabilitation facility. Pakistan denied the claims and said that it had only targeted Taliban military installations. While the health ministry spokesperson maintained that there were "more than 200 martyrs and more than 200 injured," deputy government spokesperson Hamdullah Fitrat claimed death toll was at least "double" that, with 250 wounded. Zabihullah Mujahid declared it a "crime against humanity".

On 17 March, five Pakistani soldiers were killed and three wounded in a skirmish at Ghulam Khan border crossing in North Waziristan District. A militant attack in Badaber injured two policemen.

On 18 March, Pakistani missile strikes in Asadabad wounded six civilians. According to Taliban, Pakistan conducted 63 missile strikes on Nari District, 33 on Manogai, 13 on Sarkani, six on Shultan and six on Asadabad. A quadcopter strike in Bannu District wounded four civilians.

=== Eid al-Fitr ceasefire (19–24 March) ===
On 18 March, Pakistan and Afghanistan both announced that they would observe a "temporary pause" in hostilities during the Islamic holiday of Eid al-Fitr, on the request of Saudi Arabia, Qatar, and Turkey. Pakistan's information minister said the ceasefire would run from midnight on 19 March to midnight on 24 March.

On 19 March, Taliban claimed that despite the ceasefire Pakistan conducted 72 mortar attacks in Kunar province firing 25 artillery shells in Nari District only, and that two civilians were killed in shelling in Nuristan Province. On the Pakistani side meanwhile, a civilian was killed and three wounded in an Afghan mortar attack on Kurram District.

On 22 March, Taliban claimed that Pakistani artillery strikes in Kunar killed a person and wounded another, and also claimed that Pakistani forces attacked a vehicle in Paktia province causing no casualties. Pakistani forces killed two TTP insurgents in an attempted attack on an under-construction Police Station in Kurram District.

On 23 March, TTP militants kidnapped six people from Orakzai District.

=== Renewed intensity (24 March – 7 April) ===
Following the expiration of temporary ceasefire, Pakistani armed forces carried out a drone strike targeting the 209 Al-Fatah Corps in Balkh province during the night of 24 March, according to local Afghan sources. Taliban officials in Balkh confirmed the presence of drones in the province but denied that the base belonging to 209 Al-Fatah Corps had been struck. Taliban claimed that a civilian was killed and three were wounded in Pakistani artillery shelling in Kunar.

On 25 March, Faridun Samim, a spokesperson for the Taliban governor in Nuristan said that Pakistani forces were attacking vehicles attempting to enter Kamdesh and Bargi Matal, forcing the closure of roads to both districts while Taliban authorities sought an alternative route. Afghan local sources had earlier reported that daily Pakistani shelling had made access to the areas difficult. According to those sources, around 40 Taliban fighters had been killed in clashes with Pakistani forces, although the figure was not officially confirmed, and Taliban forces had dispatched two battalions to eastern Nuristan to prevent the border districts from being left undefended. Residents said that communication routes in eastern Nuristan, particularly in Kamdesh and Bargi Matal, had been closed for about 20 days due to clashes and Pakistani attacks, causing severe food shortages and seriously affecting daily life.

Some residents warned that, if the situation continued for another week or two, it could lead to a humanitarian crisis, and also expressed concern that the districts might fall to Pakistani forces. Since the closure of roads, Taliban have been airlifting essential supplies to effected areas. Locals in Nuristan also said that the road between Kunar and Nuristan had been closed, and that Pakistani soldiers targeted anyone travelling along the route. Residents of Kunar and Nuristan state that while artillery attacks had occurred in the area for years, road closures and airstrikes had been relatively rare in the past.

Meanwhile, an Afghan media outlet, citing a Pakistani official, reported that Pakistani security forces had taken control of several strategic border posts. The official said the positions had been secured because of their tactical importance and elevation, and stated that Pakistan's aim was not to seize Afghan territory but to prevent cross-border infiltration and protect vulnerable areas inside Pakistan. Enayatullah Toofan, a member of Taliban's High Council for Armed Forces Coordination, states that Pakistani forces have occupied parts of Paktika province and issued Pakistani identity cards to the residents there. According to him, Pakistan wants to open girls schools in those areas.

However, Enayatullah Khwarizmi, a spokesperson for the Afghan Ministry of Defense, said that all areas on the Afghan side of the border remained under Afghan control and that the Afghan armed forces were committed to defending every inch of the country's territory. He added that efforts were ongoing to secure and defend remote and hard-to-reach areas.

Also, on 25 March, two TTP militants were killed in a CTD operation in Tank District.

On 27 March, BBC Dari citing satellite imagery, reported that Pakistan had fenced off 32 square kilometers of land in Paktika province, raising speculation that it may have occupied the area. According to BBC Dari, no visible fence line could be seen on 20 March, but by 23 March satellite imagery showed a new fence that had been built 12 kilometers inside Afghan territory. BBC Dari also reported that, after the completion of the first fence line, a second fence was built at the mouth of the same area, more than 13.5 kilometers inside Afghan territory. However, the Afghan Ministry of Defense said that Mali Khan Siddiq, the deputy army chief of the Afghan armed forces, had visited border areas in Paktika and dismissed claims that Pakistani forces had occupied Terwa district as false propaganda. Naseer Ahmad Faiq, Afghanistan's acting Permanent Representative to the UN, said that if reports of Pakistan seizing Afghan territory were true, they would amount to "naked aggression" and should be condemned in the strongest terms. He added that any occupation of Afghan land would be illegal under international law, violate the UN Charter and Afghanistan's territorial integrity, and that Afghanistan's sovereignty was non-negotiable.

On the same day, Taliban officials released a video that they said showed Taliban forces demolishing a Pakistani military post in Kunar province, which they claimed to have captured earlier. Pakistani officials denied Taliban claims and said that military post lacks identifiable features of a Pakistani installation, such as the national flag or proximity to the international border fence. They further asserted that the demolished structure was an Afghan facility located within Afghan territory, not a Pakistani military post.

On 28 March, tribal elders and residents of Nuristan urged Taliban authorities to reopen roads that had been closed for weeks, which residents attributed to Pakistani artillery shelling. Taliban officials pledged to address the issue, but said the closures were caused by natural factors. Residents described the situation in the Kamdesh and Bargi Matal districts as siege-like and warned that, if it continued for another week or two, it could lead to a humanitarian emergency and increase the risk of the districts falling to Pakistani forces. The closure of communication routes in districts of Nuristan, together with continued Pakistani artillery attacks in parts of Kunar and Nuristan, raised concerns among observers.

Some suggested that the moves may have been intended to open a route or connection line for Taliban opponents in northern Afghanistan. Mohammad Azam Nuristani, a political activist from Nuristan, said that the Taliban lacked the ability to reopen roads closed by Pakistani forces and were preventing residents from speaking publicly about the issue. He also said, citing images and other sources, that Pakistan had seized a strategic point in Nuristan and was seeking to prolong the conflict on Afghan soil through Khost and Nuristan. On the same day, Pakistani officials stated that, since the start of Operation Ghazab-lil-Haq, terror-related incidents in Khyber Pakhtunkhwa had fallen by 65%. According to officials, Khyber Pakhtunkhwa recorded 240 terror-related incidents before the operation, which declined to 80 following the start of the military operation, Punjab Counterterrorism Department also claimed to have captured 36 "suspected terrorists" including two Pakistani Taliban. A policeman and two militants were killed, three policemen and four militants were injured in two engagements in Bannu District. TTP killed two Federal Constabulary in Kohat District.

On 29 March, Taliban forces and Pakistani border guards engaged in an artillery duel which affected parts of Afghanistan's Kunar province and Pakistan's Bajaur district. Taliban officials said that an artillery shelling by Pakistani forces on areas in Asadabad, the provincial capital of Kunar province, had killed one civilian and injured sixteen others. On the same day, Afghan Foreign Minister, Amir Khan Muttaqi, said Afghanistan wanted to resolve tensions with Pakistan through dialogue and mutual understanding. He added that Afghanistan had taken serious measures to ensure its territory was not used against Pakistan and said its military actions were defensive. Pakistan's Defence Minister, Khawaja Asif, implicitly confirmed that indirect talks with the Afghan Taliban were taking place through third-party mediators, although he described the process as unstructured and informal. He added that if the efforts failed to secure peace, Pakistan could return to its previous approach and escalate military operations in parts of Afghanistan. Pakistani military claimed to have killed 10 TTP militants in an operation in Khyber District and three more in Bannu.

On 31 March, Taliban and Pakistani forces clashed in Dangam District of Kunar Province.

On 1 April, 4 police personnel and 5 civilians were injured in an improvised explosive device (IED) blast carried out by Pakistani Taliban in Pakistan's Lakki Marwat district.

On 2 April, Pakistani officials said that they foiled an infiltration attempt along the Afghanistan–Pakistan border, killing eight militants and seizing a large quantity of weapons and ammunition. That same day, Taliban and Pakistani officials confirmed that they were holding preliminary talks mediated by China in Ürümqi. Pakistani officials described the talks as working-level and said that they had sent their mid-level delegation to take part in the talks. Also that same day, three civilians were injured in Pakistani drone strikes in Paktika Province and two civilians were injured in a drone strike in Khost Province, and two civilians were killed and 25 wounded in more than 155 mortar and artillery strikes in Kunar Province.

On 3 April, Taliban officials said that two civilians were killed and 25 others were injured as a result of Pakistani forces cross-border strikes in parts of Eastern Afghanistan. On the same day, Pakistani Taliban carried out a vehicle borne suicide bombing in the vicinity of a police station, killing five civilians and injuring police personnel and civilians. 37 insurgents were killed and more than 80 wounded, in a failed infiltration attempt across the border in North Waziristan.

On 5 April, Taliban officials stated that between 22 February and 3 April, at least 761 civilians were killed and 626 others injured in attacks attributed to Pakistani forces. Taliban officials did not clarify whether any Taliban members were included among the casualties or what specific targets were struck. According to the officials, Pakistani forces fired approximately 15,000 mortar rounds and rockets into Afghanistan during this period. The reported affected regions included Kabul, Kandahar, Paktia, Paktika, Nangarhar, Khost, Kunar, Laghman, and Nuristan. In addition to human casualties, Taliban authorities reported significant damage to civilian infrastructure, including around 1,140 homes, 13 religious schools, 13 public schools, three health centers, 34 mosques, and 42 vehicles. Previously, UNAMA had reported that between 26 February and 16 March, at least 76 civilian were killed and 213 were injured in Afghanistan as result of armed clashes between Taliban forces and Pakistan armed forces. On the same day, Pakistani officials said that they had foiled an attempt by Taliban forces to attack a Pakistani border post in Khyber Pakhtunkhwa's Ghulam Khan Sector, killing 37 Taliban fighters and injuring 80 others. Furthermore, Pakistani officials stated that since the start of hostilities, 796 Afghan Taliban and TTP militants had been killed and more than 1,043 injured. They added that Pakistani forces had destroyed 286 check-posts, captured 44 others, destroyed 249 tanks, armored vehicles, and artillery guns, and targeted 81 locations across Afghanistan in air strikes.

On 6 April, an Afghan media outlet, citing tribal elders and local residents, reported that Taliban forces had abandoned several border posts in Nuristan and Kunar following recent clashes with Pakistani forces. The abandoned positions were said to be located in the Bari Kot area of Nari district, as well as in parts of Bargi Matal and Kamdesh. According to the report, Taliban fighters who withdrew from the posts took shelter in village mosques. Some tribal elders from these area accuse the Taliban of failing to maintain security in the border areas and of spreading misinformation about their presence. They say that Taliban members travel by helicopter to district centres in order to create the impression that the group remains active in the region. On the same day, Abdul Haq Fida, spokesperson for the 203 Mansoori Corps, stated that Taliban fighters had attacked and destroyed a border outpost belonging to Pakistani forces near Khost, killing four Pakistani soldiers. Two policemen and a security guard were killed in two separate skirmishes in Bannu District. On 5 and 6 April, Pakistani and Afghan forces exchanged artillery strikes near the Zoram Fort in North Waziristan.

On 7 April, United Nations Office for the Coordination of Humanitarian Affairs (OCHA) said that around 100,000 people from Bargi Matal and Kamdesh district of Nuristan lack access to humanitarian aid. According to OCHA, residents cannot access markets or health services and face severe shortages of food and medical supplies due to the closure of roads caused by cross-border fire from Pakistani border guards. Local residents said they had repeatedly appealed to Taliban authorities for help, but no concrete action had been taken, and warned that they might seek assistance from Pakistani forces if the situation continued.

On the same day, Afghanistan's foreign minister, Amir Khan Muttaqi, said that useful discussions had taken place between Taliban and Pakistani officials and expressed hope that minor differences in interpretation would not hinder progress in the negotiations. Meanwhile, Pakistani officials said that they had put forward three core demands to Taliban representatives: that Afghanistan formally designate Tehreek-e-Taliban Pakistan (TTP) as a terrorist organisation, dismantle its infrastructure, and provide verifiable proof of these actions. Pakistani officials also said that military operations in Afghanistan would continue until militant safe havens there were eliminated. Five policemen were injured in an IED attack by TTP in Lakki Marwat District.

=== Low-intensity conflict (8 April – 24 May) ===
On 8 April, the Taliban-run Afghan foreign ministry stated that talks with Pakistani officials in China had concluded and described the discussions as constructive. Chinese officials said that representatives of Pakistan and the Taliban had agreed to work toward an early easing of tensions and to avoid actions that could escalate the situation. Pakistani officials did not comment on the outcome of talks. On the same day, Amir Khan Muttaqi, the Taliban's foreign minister, said while meeting with diplomats from Central Asian states that the group would not permit Afghan territory to be used by any group to threaten neighboring states. Although he did not name any organisation, he said the presence of such elements anywhere was unacceptable and that the Taliban intended to deal with the matter. He also stated that the Taliban were committed to easing tensions with Pakistan through dialogue and said he hoped the talks would produce positive outcomes. However, on 9 April, Mohammad Naeem Wardak, the Taliban's deputy foreign minister, said that talks between Pakistani and Taliban officials in China had ended without agreement and attributed their failure to Pakistani officials.

On 10 April, local elders in Kunar and Nuristan said that Taliban border forces had withdrawn from several border posts in Bari Kot in Nari district, Kunar, and in Kamdesh district, Nuristan, and had taken shelter in village mosques. They said that roads leading to Kamdesh and Bargi Matal through Nari had been blocked, possibly to hide the withdrawal from border positions. Local sources said that Pakistani and Taliban posts were located close to each other. It was unclear why the Taliban had withdrawn or whether heavy Pakistani shelling had forced the evacuation. Some elders said that the Taliban lacked the logistical capacity to maintain their forces and had withdrawn out of fear of Pakistani attacks. Others accused the group of misleading the public and the media by using helicopters to visit district centres in order to create the impression that it still controlled the border areas and that the roads remained open. Militants killed a policeman in Peshawar.

On 12 April, a soldier was killed and four wounded in an IED attack in Bannu District. A civilian was injured in a mortar strike in Bajaur District. Two TTP militants were killed in a drone strike in Lakki Marwat District.

On 13 April, local Afghan sources reported that Pakistani border guards fired artillery rounds in parts of Khas Kunar and Nari districts of Kunar province, causing material damage but no casualties. Taliban authorities did not comment on reports regarding artillery shelling in parts of Kunar province. On the same day, local elders in Nuristan said that residents of Kamdesh and Bargi Matal districts were facing severe food shortages because of prolonged road closures. They warned of a possible humanitarian crisis if food was not delivered by air and said that the Taliban had neglected the situation. According to the elders, roads to the districts had been closed for nearly two months because of cross-border fire by Pakistani forces, and Taliban authorities had neither reopened the routes nor built alternative roads as promised. Residents said that food supplies in local markets had been exhausted, and warned of a shortage of wheat and medicine in health centres. Later on the day, the roads leading to Kamdesh and Bargi Matal districts were temporarily reopened following a meeting between tribal elders of these districts and tribal elders of Pakistan's Chitral district. A polio vaccination team was attacked by militants in Hangu District with the subsequent clash resulting in the death of two militant whereas a policeman was killed and four more were injured.

On 14 April, Punjab CTD claimed to have captured 16 "suspected terrorists" including a TTP suicide bomber.

On 15 April, tribal elders from eastern Afghanistan and Pakistan's Chitral district reached an agreement to reopen key routes linking Kamdesh and Barg-i Matal in Nuristan after nearly two months of closure caused by firing from Pakistani border guards. The talks were held on the Pakistani side of the border, at a Pakistani military facility, and did not include Taliban representatives. Under the agreement, both sides committed to a ceasefire across areas including Nari, Kamdesh, Bargi Matal, Arandu, and Chitral. Local elders also said Pakistani forces asked communities not to allow Pakistani Taliban to shelter in the area, and that if anyone did so, local people should stand against them. On the same day, Pakistani officials said that three civilians were killed and three others were injured in artillery shelling carried out by Taliban forces in border areas of Pakistan's Bajaur district. Pakistani officials said the shelling was intended to support an infiltration attempt, which was foiled by Pakistani border guards, destroying a gun position and inflicting heavy casualties to Taliban forces. CTD also claimed to have killed two militants in Peshawar. Clashes and clearance operations in Hangu district led to two militants being killed and several injured while a policeman was killed and another was injured.

On 17 April, Taliban-run Radio Television Afghanistan reported that 10 rockets launched by Pakistan destroyed a health center in Barikot, Kunar Province.

On 18 April, an abandoned police post in Bannu District was destroyed by militants using explosives.

On 19 April, a TTP militant and an alleged suicide bomber were killed by Pakistani forces in an operation in Bannu District. Two Federal Constabulary personnel were also killed by militants in Bannu District, the same day.

On 20 April, Taliban forces opened fire on a suspected Pakistani unmanned aircraft in Zaranj, Nimruz province, killing one Afghan civilian and injuring another. The victims were travelling in a vehicle in the city when they were struck by bullets fired by the Taliban forces. According to an Afghan media outlet, Pakistani aircraft have repeatedly patrolled Afghan airspace over the past two months, promoting Taliban forces to fire at them, which in some cases has resulted in casualties and damage to Afghan civilians. Two TTP militants and a policeman were killed in a clash in Lakki Marwat.

On 21 April, Pakistani military claimed to have carried out an operation in Khyber District killing 22 TTP militants while a child was also killed in the crossfire.

On 22 April, local Afghan sources reported that Pakistani forces carried out mortar strikes targeting Asadabad, provincial capital of Kunar province. Earlier, local Afghan sources said that the villages of Kochi, Shahbaz and Koremar in Kunar province were targeted by artillery strikes carried out by Pakistani forces. Elsewhere, border areas of Paktika province were also subjected to cross border shelling by Pakistani forces, according to local Afghan sources. No casualties were reported in these attacks, and Taliban officials did not comment on them.

On 24 April, TTP attacked a police station in Dera Ismail Khan District using heavy weapons damaging the station and nearby buildings.

On 26 April, three civilians were wounded in a Taliban artillery attack at Zalulkhel area in South Waziristan. In response, Pakistan claimed to have destroyed Taliban firing positions and foiled infiltration attempts.

On 27 April, seven people were killed and 85 others were injured in Pakistani strikes in Kunar province, including a strike on the Sayed Jamaluddin Afghani University in the provincial capital of Asadabad. Taliban deputy spokesman Hamdullah Fitrat stated that Afghanistan regarded the strikes as "grave and inexcusable war crimes, a blatant act of brutality, and a provocative action." Afghanistan's higher education ministry claimed that about 30 students and professors were injured. Pakistan denied any responsibility in the attacks. Three children were injured in a quadcopter strike targeting the house of a PMLN leader in North Waziristan.

On 28 April, Pakistan claimed to have destroyed multiple Afghan Taliban posts and vehicles in Chaman sector. On 28-29 April, Pakistani forces claimed to have killed eight militants attempting to infiltrate the border in Mohmand District and five more in North Waziristan.

On 29 April, five civilians were wounded in Taliban shelling on Angoor Adda. Police foiled an attack on a post in Bannu District killing six militants.

On 30 April, two security personnel were killed in a militant attack on a police post in Lakki Marwat District. Pakistani military claimed to have foiled two cross-border militant infiltrations from Afghanistan killing eight militants in Mohmand District and five in North Waziristan.

On 1 May, two soldiers were wounded in a quadcopter strike from Afghanistan on their position in Mohmand District. In Bannu, a constable was killed and a civilian was wounded in a rocket attack on an armored vehicle. Militants killed Malik Saifullah, a tribal leader in North Waziristan leading to heavy skirmishes between the militants and the tribesmen, in which at least two militants were also killed. A quadcopter strike from Afghanistan on a cricket ground in Bajaur district, injured three civilians.

On 2 May, Counter Terrorism Department claimed to have captured 21 suspected militants including those belonging to TTP in operations throughout Punjab. Pakistan claimed that 52 civilians had been killed in attacks from Afghanistan since the resumption of hostilities after the temporary ceasefire on Eid-ul-Fitr.

On 3 May, a policeman was killed by militants in Lakki Marwat. A TTP commander was killed in an operation in Dera Ismail Khan.

On 4 May, Pakistan reportedly launched an attack which resulted in the deaths of three civilians and the destruction of multiple schools, mosques, and a health center in Afghanistan. Pakistan disputed the claims. On the same day, a suicide attack foiled by security forces at a border checkpoint in Khyber Pakhtunkhwa resulted in a single casualty, seven civilians were also wounded. Afghan Taliban deployed hundreds of fighters and dozens of military vehicles to Spin Boldak, Shorabak and Registan districts along the Pakistan border in Kunar Province from other areas.

On 6 May 2026, in Hangu district, security forces launched an operation after militants captured a police checkpost, a school and Shinwari Fort.

On 7 May 2026, three children were killed and 10 civilians were wounded in a cylinder bombing by TTP and mortar attacks by Afghan Taliban in South Waziristan. A mortar attack by insurgents killed six civilians and wounded 14 whereas two policemen were injured by sniper fire during the operation in Hangu, following which Pakistani forces took control of the area. Two children were killed and four were injured in crossfire during a skirmish in Bajaur District. On 7-8 May 2026, Pakistani forces conducted two operations in Dera Ismail Khan and Tank District, killing five militants.

On 8 May 2026, eight civilians were injured in a quadcopter strike in Bannu District. A police constable was killed by militants after his abduction in Bajaur.

On 9 May 2026, a car bomb exploded at a Pakistani checkpoint in Bannu, leaving at least 21 dead. Ittehad-ul-Mujahideen Pakistan, a Pakistani Taliban splinter group, claimed responsibility for the attack.

On 10 May 2026, an Al-Qaeda affiliate was arrested by CTD in Pakpattan District. Pakistani forces killed seven militants including two key commanders, and destroyed militant infrastructure in a clearance operation in North Waziristan District.

On 11 May 2026, a civilian was killed while foiling a suicide bombing in Attock District.

On 12 May 2025, UNAMA stated that 372 civilians were killed and 397 had been wounded in Pakistani strikes on Afghanistan.

On 13 May 2026, nine people including two traffic police personnel were killed and 33 injured in a VBIED attack by TTP in Lakki Marwat District, TTP militants also blew up a bridge in Bannu District. TTP militants captured a bank van and robbed PKR 80M. CM Khyber Pakhtunkhwa claimed that 80% of militants operating in the province were foreigners.

On 14 May 2026, nine TTP militants and four military personnel were killed in a skirmish following an insurgent attack on Mena Army camp in Bajaur District. Militants attacked and killed an ambulance driver in Bannu. Aircraft activity and drones were reported over Kabul in the morning, followed by two large explosions and gunfire.

On 15 May 2026, further drone activity, anti-aircraft fire and explosions were reported in Kabul, for the second consecutive night.

On 16 May 2026, five militants including two commanders were killed under Operation Intiqam-e-Shuhada in retaliation for the suicide bombing targeting police, the week prior.

On 18 May 2026, two policemen deployed to protect polio vaccination teams were killed by militants in Bajaur District.

On 19 May 2026, Pakistan's Prime Minister Shahbaz Sharif reiterated that Operation Ghazab lil-Haq is "continuing with full resolve" and would remain continued, against Afghan Taliban regime and it's terrorist proxies, continuing to target their hideouts and infrastructure. After the statement, Pakistani forces conducted a clearance operation in Shewa, North Waziristan killing 22 TTP militants. Meanwhile, a policeman and a Federal Constabulary personnel were killed in separate attacks in Dera Ismail Khan and Tank districts.

On 21 May 2026, two children were killed in a quadcopter strike in Bajaur District. Five TTP militants including a commander were killed by Pakistani forces in an operation in North Waziristan.

On 22 May 2026, 19 JuA and 3 TTP militants were killed in interjihadist violence in Kurram District.

On 23 May 2026, 12 militants were killed in fighting with the police forces in Bannu District, whereas a retired FCB personnel was also killed and four policemen and a child were injured in the clashes, the death toll rose to 25 militants, two policemen and two civilians, the next day while seven policemen and three civilians were injured, a 10kg IED was also defused. Punjab CTD also claimed to have captured and arrested 13 "suspected terrorists" in 58 raids throughout the province.

On 24 May 2026, 11 TTP militants were killed in a series of operations in North Waziristan and two more in Lakki Marwat. Militants destroyed a school and a health center in Tank District.

=== Eid al-Adha ceasefire (25–29 May) ===
On 24 May 2026, the Pakistani Taliban announced a three-day ceasefire period for Eid al Adha.

=== Continued hostilities (30 May – present) ===
On 30 May 2026, five TTP militants were killed in combat in Darra Adamkhel in a military operation and in the same operation, eight more insurgents including two Afghan Tariq Gidar group affiliates were killed, the following day. Insurgents attacked a police station in Wana.

On 1 June 2026, four TTP militants were killed during an attempted VBIED suicide attack on a military post near Miranshah. Two civilians were injured in a mortar attack in Salarzai Tehsil. Pakistani forces start "Operation Iron Fist-3" in Miranshah.

From 1-3 June 2026, Pakistani forces cleared the villages of Nadeem Kot and Khuzai from TTP control, killing eight insurgents and wounding 14 to 16 under Operation Iron Fist-3 in Miranshah. On 3 June 2026, allegedly Pakistan-linked hacking group "SideCopy" conducted a cyberattack against Taliban Finance Ministry, provincial financial and revenue offices, Pashto-speaking officials and local government employees.

On 4 June 2026, ISPR claimed that Pakistani forces had killed two TTP militants in Dera Ismail Khan District and two more in Sheikh Banda area of Mohmand District. Pakistani forces began the second phase of Operation Iron Fist-3 in Miranshah. Taliban and Pakistan held an informal talk in Termez, mediated by Uzbekistan.

On 5 June 2026, Pakistan reiterated that it has the "right" to strike militant targets inside Afghanistan. Two sons of a tribal leader were killed in Wana.

On 6 June 2026, ISPR stated that Pakistani forces had killed 27 TTP insurgents in and around Miranshah, over the last three days. Meanwhile, Saddar Police, CTD, Elite Force and Quick Response Force destroyed militant hideouts during an operation near the Wanda Painda Khan area in Lakki Marwat District.

On 8 June 2026, two militants were killed in a military operation in Garah Madah area of Daraban Tehsil.

On 9 June 2026, militants attacked a Pakistani border post in Hassankhel killing six Frontier Constabulary personnel and wounding four, while three personnel were captured by the militants. A police constable was also kidnapped and a girls school was destroyed by militants in Wana.

On 10 June 2026, Pakistan conducted airstrikes in Khost, Kunar and Paktika provinces of Afghanistan, with Taliban claiming that 13 civilians, including 11 children, a woman, and an elderly man had been killed and 14 wounded in these airstrikes. At least 9 people were killed after a house in Spera district was struck. In Barmal, 3 children were killed. Pakistan, however claimed that 26 TTP militants were killed in these airstrikes. Meanwhile, in Darga Saheedan area of Karak District, eight police personnel were wounded in an ambush by insurgents.

On 11 June, a police constable was killed in an attack in North Waziristan and another was killed the following day. On June 11, a Government Middle School was blown up by militants in Lakki Marwat District. A TTP commander Abu Bakr and "several" militants linked to him were killed in Pakistani airstrikes on hideouts in Bannu District. A suicide bomber was killed and six TTP insurgents were killed in skirmishes with Pakistani forces in Kurram District. An attempted motorcycle bomb attack on a Police APC was foiled in Lakki Marwat District.

On 12 June, an alleged TTP commander was killed in a police operation in Bannu District, two bodies of civilians killed by militants were also recovered and an attempt to destroy a bridge was foiled. Pakistani forces claimed that they had concluded Operation Iron Fist-3, which was carried out from 1-12 June 2026, killing 62 TTP militants including four commanders and capturing eight, destroying 14 militant infrastructure sites, with 48 insurgents being killed in the second phase of operations, according to ISPR. Two civilians were killed and several wounded in a suicide blast near a mosque in Lakki Marwat.

On 13 June, a religious scholar was assassinated by TTP and a bridge and a mosque were damaged in an attack by TTP insurgents in Bannu District. CTD captured the brother of an Afghan TTP militant, who himself was allegedly involved in supplying drones, electronic equipment and phones to TTP insurgents.

On 14 June, militants attacked a police checkpoint in Kurram District killing a civilian and wounding three police officers, after which militant hideouts were struck by Pakistani artillery fire. 12 insurgents were killed in an infiltration attempt across the border from Afghanistan in Chaman District. Four peace committee members were killed in a TTP attack in Lakki Marwat District and ten suspected insurgents were arrested from Karak District. A TTP drone strike in Kurram District killed four civilians and wounded four more. Three TTP militants were killed while attacking a border post in Panjgur District. A suicide VBIED attack on a police post in Dera Ghazi Khan District killed two personnel and wounded three others. An abandoned police post was blown up by militants in Khyber District.

On 15 June, Ali Malang group from Nowshera and Khattab group in Makran Division formally pledged allegiance to TTP. A civilian was killed while six soldiers and three labourers were injured in a TTP drone strike targeting the construction site of a Pakistani military post in Spinwam. An On alleged militant and a facilitator were captured during an infiltration attempt from Tirah valley into Orakzai District.

On 16 June, a Pakistan Army post was hit by a drone strike and insurgents blew up a gas pipeline in Lakki Marwat District, a CCTV camera was also targeted with an IED. In Khyber District, two engagements took place between Peace Committee members and militants, one near the house of a peace committee member where five were killed and the other when insurgents were evacuating their wounded. Three bodies including a dead TTP commander were recovered from Bannu District. FC Balochistan conducted an operation in Chagai District capturing weapons and ammunition originating from Afghanistan. An IMP insurgent was killed in a military operation in North Waziristan. Three TTP insurgents were killed in a military operation in Kohat District and three more in Charsada District. In South Waziristan, two FC soldiers were killed in an engagement with militants. CTD killed five suspected insurgents in an operation in Attock District.

On 17 June, two policemen were injured by TTP militants in Karachi in a shootout. An insurgent was killed and several wounded in a military operation in Bajaur District. Three militants were killed in a CTD operation in Mardan District.

On 18 June, an IMP insurgent was killed in North Waziristan. 18 people were injured in an insurgent drone attack on a peace committee in Lakki Marwat District, a firefight between militants and police also took place in the area. A policeman was killed and three were injured in an insurgent attack in Lower Dir. Two policemen were wounded in a militant attack in Bajaur District, separately militants also destroyed a girls High School. In Bannu, TTP militants captured a supply vehicle and several explosions were also reported. TTP militants destroyed an excavator in an attack in Darra Adam Khel. An insurgent commander was killed in an operation in Tank District. The house of a Tehreek-e-Taliban Ghazi commander was destroyed in South Waziristan. TTP claimed to have conducted three consecutive drone attacks on a military camp in Chaman District. Two policemen were killed, six wounded and sixteen captured in a TTP raid on a police position in Kurram District, followed by an ambush on incoming reinforcements. A military camp in Mirali was targeted by a Taliban drone strike.

On 19 June, Afghanistan launched airstrikes inside Pakistan claiming that the camps targeted were used by terror groups like the ISIS-K and "hostile intelligence circles" that collaborated and planned attacks inside Afghanistan. Pakistan denied such strikes had taken place on any camps and instead claimed to have downed an intruding drone. An insurgent was killed following a drone strike on a security post in Lakki Marwat, which wounded three police personnel. Afghan Taliban announced the creation of a new 8,000 strong "Hibati" special unit to be deployed at the border against Pakistan, of which 4,000 were already deployed.

On 20 June, two engagements occurred between police and insurgents in Lakki Marwat District. Hathikhel tribal lashkar captured three family members of a TTP insurgent in Bannu District, accusing them of being Taliban collaborators. TTP captured an FC soldier from Kohat District, later releasing him on condition of resignment. Sindh Rangers captured a TTP militant from Karachi. A policeman was injured in a TTP grenade attack on a police post in Tank District. Two TTP IuM insurgents were killed in a military operation in North Waziristan. An operation against a TTP commander was initiated in South Waziristan. Twin bomb blasts in Bannu killed seven civilians and wounded three. TTP "intelligence" claimed to have assassinated a Pakistani intelligence collaborator in Quetta.

On 21 June, CTD captured a trained TTP suicide bomber from Karachi. A police station in Lakki Marwat District was targeted by a quadcopter drone strike. An FC soldier was slightly injured in a drone attack on a post in Bannu District. A soldier from Sindh Regiment was killed in an engagement with militants near the border in Orakzai District. Five personnel from a Bomb Disposal Unit were killed in a militant attack in North Waziristan. A soldier was injured in an IED explosion in Karak District. Eight TTP militants were killed in a military IBO in Dosali.

On 22 June, an insurgent commander was killed at South Waziristan-Chaman border.

On 23 June, a civilian was injured in a militant drone strike on a rickshaw in Bannu District, while an FC soldier and a sweeper at a police station were abducted, the Bannu cantonment was hit twice with mortar shells. A government school in South Waziristan was destroyed by militants. Several artillery and mortar shells fired from Afghanistan hit Angoor Adda and Zalol Khel, two unexploded shells were also recovered from Bajaur District.

On 24 June, a school in South Waziristan was destroyed by insurgents. Eight policemen including an SHO were abducted from South Waziristan. CTD killed six TTP militants in an operation in Lower Dir. Four TTP militants were killed in an operation near Miramshah and four more in Tank District whereas a TTP attack in Hangu District was repulsed, a soldier also died in the operation in Tank District. A quadcopter strike on a police station in Bannu District wounded two policemen whereas a school headmaster was also abducted from the district. An airstrike in South Waziristan killed two TTP insurgents.

On 25 June, a woman was killed and a child was wounded in a mortar strike on a house in Bannu District and four were killed in a TTP attack on an ambulance. Four TTP militants were killed in a military operation in Bannu District, two in Bajaur District and an operation was also conducted in Karak District. A TTP drone strike in South Waziristan killed three people.

On 26 June, a militant faction in Pishin district joined JuA. A Chitral Scouts personnel was killed in a drone strike on Orson Post 3337 at the Afghanistan border. An FC soldier and a TTP insurgent were killed in two separate engagements in Tank District. Seven insurgents were killed in a military operation in Bannu District. A soldier was killed in an engagement in South Waziristan whereas two militants were killed by Al-Buraq Division in D.I. Khan District.

On 27 June, three Rangers personnel were killed in a JuA attack on a Rangers installment in Karachi.

On 28 June, Pakistan carried out a "ground operation" and launched airstrikes in eastern Afghanistan targeting Paktia, Paktika and Kunar provinces. Afghanistan spokesperson Zabihullah Mujahid condemned the action and claimed that the attacks resulted in the deaths and injuries of dozens of civilians, including women and children. Taliban officials later told BBC Pashto that at least 100 people were killed or wounded. The combined casualties from both the ground operation and aerial strikes were 36 deaths and 160 wounded according to official figures. Hamdullah Fitrat, Taliban's deputy spokesperson, said the Pakistani forces targeted a home in Paktia's Chamkani district, killing an elder and a child, while injuring others. The area was struck again 25 minutes after the first strike when residents had gathered to rescue people. 28 villagers died in the second strike while 158 more were wounded. Hospital footage showed infants and elderly victims on stretchers. A survivor directly refuted Pakistan's claims that the targets were terrorists. Additionally, six more civilians were killed in a Giyan district village in Paktika province. Pakistani electronic jammers also downed a drone in North Waziristan.

On 29 June, insurgents killed a police constable in Bannu District, while four TTP militants were also killed in an operation in the district. An explosion and fire were reported in Kabul. Six border guards were killed, nine wounded and one abducted as Pakistani Taliban militants overrun a border post in Chitral District.

On 30 June, an Afghan Refugees Camp was hit in a drone strike/shootdown in Pishin District and a school was hit by a drone strike in Kila Abdullah District, Pakistan Air Force also downed a drone in Quetta. Pakistan claimed to have shot down a total of four "rudimentary" drones from Afghanistan. Afghanistan claimed that its forces successfully hit an ISKP camp in Pishin District. Border post No. 2417 in Kurram District was targeted by sniper fire killing one Pakistani FC soldier. On 1 July, an Afghan drone was shot down by Pakistani forces in Khyber District. A soldier of FC Wing 177 was killed by insurgents in Bajaur District and another FC soldier was killed in South Waziristan, moreover an Elite Force cop was killed in Hangu District. TTP, however claimed to have conducted 16 attacks in South Waziristan, North Waziristan, Karak, Kohat, Bajaur, Peshawar, and Harnai on the day, claiming to have killed 11 Pakistani personnel. A drone strike in Mirali injured two civilians.

On 2 July, Pakistani forces intercepted a drone targeting the 134 Wing of Pishin Scouts. A girls school was damaged in an insurgent attack in Bannu District, while an IED targeting a bridge was also neutralized. A drone attack in Bajaur allegedly intended at a Pakistani position, killed three civilians and wounded eight more. Two policemen were killed and one was wounded in a militant ambush in Mohmand District. Khalid Masood, a TTP commander was assassinated by "unidentified attackers" inside Afghanistan in Ghazni District.

On 3 July, Pakistani forces killed three insurgents in Bajaur District, while TTP claimed to have assassinated a suspected Pakistani spy in Khyber District. JuA announced its formal split from the TTP. Two FC soldiers were killed in a Taliban sniper attack on the Do Jando border Post in Khyber District. An IED was also defused by Pakistani forces in Wana.

On 5 July, heavy fighting between Pakistani and Afghan troops took place in Khyber District, following cross border fire from Afghanistan which wounded three Pakistani soldiers. A TTP insurgent was killed in a military operation in North Waziristan while a woman was injured in a grenade attack in South Waziristan. Mullah Khel tribesmen repelled militants infiltrating into the village of Maulana Zeenatullah Badan in Orakzai District. A quadcopter attack in South Waziristan killed three civilians and wounded four, two more were injured in a separate quadcopter attack there while three were injured in a quadcopter attack in Bannu District. Pakistan initiated "Operation Shaban" in Balochistan.

On 6 July, clashes between Pakistani and Afghan forces continued in Khyber District while nine dead bodies of tribesmen were recovered from Quetta District following a strike by 30-40 TTP insurgents on a meeting of what they claimed to be military collaborators.

On 7 July, TTP militants attacked a police post in Ziarat District killing nine Policemen including two SHOs whereas 15 militants were killed in retaliatory clearance operations, several policemen were also captured by the TTP of which eighteen were later executed. CPEC bridge in Bannu District was destroyed by insurgents. An ATF personnel was killed in a skirmish with TTP in Quetta. A quadcopter strike in Bannu District killed one civilian and wounded four others. TTP captured a Pakistani joint post in Harnai District seizing weapons, equipment and vehicles.

On 8 July, an ambush targeting a military convoy in Lasbela killed 11 Pakistani soldiers, with ISPR stating that 38 security personnel and four civilians had been killed in three major attacks by TTP in Balochistan over the last three days, while also claiming to have killed 54 insurgents in retaliatory operations. A mortar strike in Orakzai District killed a civilian. A military attack on an insurgent roadblock in Nushki District resulted in six insurgents being killed. An attack on a police post in Bannu District was repelled resulting in two insurgents being injured.

On 9 July, an Elite Force officer was assassinated by insurgents in Tank District.

On 10 July, insurgents destroyed a bridge on the Quetta-Taftan highway in the Batto area of Nushki District. CM Balochistan claimed that 75 terrorists had been killed in various operations since July 5 in Balochistan, with 17 more being killed in Ziarat District, that day bringing the toll of those killed under Operation Shaban to 43. Pakistani forces killed four TTP insurgents under Commander Zahid in Karak District and one more TTP militant in Peshawar as well as launching helicopter strikes against TTP infrastructure in Tank District. Two Policemen were ambushed and killed in Spinwam by insurgents. Two Lashkar-e-Jhangvi militants were also captured from Karachi.

On 11 July, suspected TTP drone strike in Tank District killed a school teacher and wounded two civilians.

On 12 July, TTP insurgents killed a CTD officer in Totalai. A mortar strike damaged a house in North Waziristan. An ex-cop was killed by insurgents on Kohat–Hangu Road in Kohat District. A police officer was assassinated by insurgents in Nowshera. TTP released a video purportedly showing it's militants capturing a Frontier Corps fort in Hangu District as well as another showing downing of a military drone in Matta Tehsil.

On 13 July, eight more insurgents were killed under Operation Shaban bringing the insurgent death toll in Balochistan since July 5 to 117 whereas a soldier was killed in a TTP IED attack followed by strikes in Zarghun Ghar area of Quetta. A policeman was killed by militants in Kafshi Khel Babo Jan area of Bannu District while two were killed and two wounded in an IED attack in the village of Grah Hayat in Tank District. A bomb disposal unit personnel died while attempting to defuse a bomb targeting an abandoned security post in Hassan Khel Tehsil. A militant commander was captured in an operation in Lakki Marwat District while a JuA commander was killed in Bajaur District. Insurgents destroyed a gas pipeline in Amir Hamza Khas area of Bannu District.

On 14 July, four more insurgents were killed under Operation Shaban in Khuzdar District and an FC soldier was killed in Quetta. An IED was defused near Hussain Khel in Bettani Tehsil.

On 15 July, three more insurgents were killed under Operation Shaban bringing the death toll so far to 126 whereas a VBIED attack on the Miryan Police Station in Bannu District was foiled before it could reach the target, however one cop was killed and six were injured, four civilians were also wounded, later it was reported that four IMP insurgents were killed during the attack and that the suicide bomber was an Afghan from Paktia Province. An attack on a military post in Shalozan Tangi area of Kurram District left seven soldiers injured as well as multiple casualties among the attackers. Four dead bodies of active duty and ex-security personnel were also recovered from Harnai District while three explosions were also reported at a Mari Gas Company site near Koh e Khalifat.

On 16 July, an ambush on a police convoy in Upper Dir District left three policemen dead and 15 injured, five insurgents were also killed in an operation in Laram area of Lower Dir District. Three more insurgents were also killed under Operation Shaban bringing the toll to 129. A suicide attack on a military post in Wana was foiled with four insurgents being killed. A military operation was initiated in multiple areas of Bannu District with a facilitator of the previous day's VBIED attack being captured.

On 17 July, ISPR claimed that Pakistani forces had killed 24 TTP insurgents in Bannu District during comprehensive operations while IMP issued a warning against travel in Bannu District as it had planted landmines during the military operation. Four dead bodies were also recovered from Bannu whereas two people were injured in a drone and a bridge was destroyed by insurgentsin Miryan Tehsil of Bannu. An MBIED attack took place in Quetta with no casualties. TTP killed an FC soldier in Wara Mamund while another soldier was killed and several injured in a TTP attack on a military camp in Shakai area of South Waziristan. An insurgent vehicle was destroyed by a drone strike in Wana Tehsil. TTP issued warnings to the public, Police and tribal elders in Tank District in a video message warning against participation in military operations and also destroyed the Outar police checkpost there with explosives.

On 18 July, a premature IED detonation led to the death of five TTP militants in the Nakhtar area of Wara Mamund Tehsil while another was killed in Wana Tehsil in a foiled VBIED attack. A TTP attack on Khazina Banda post in Hangu District wounded an Elite Force Personnel. CTD conducted an operation in Koraai area of Dera Ismail Khan District killing a TTP militant. Yaftal District in Badakhsan province, was occupied by Anti-Taliban forces, Taliban later alleged Pakistani involvement and the presence of Pakistani forces among the opposition personnel.

On 19 July, heavy skirmishes took place between Afghan and Pakistani forces in Kurram District following an attack on Pakistani positions by the Taliban, Pakistani forces then launched a counteroffensive forcing Taliban to abandon multiple posts at the border. An FC soldier was killed in an IMP sniper attack on Tor Chapar post in Tirah while several civilians were injured in a drone strike in Dabori Ganda Mela area of Tirah. An insurgent was killed and eight captured in a military operation in the Greda Shah Jahan village of Bannu District, while three more alleged militants were captured from Saidu Sharif by police. Two children were injured in an insurgent mortar attack Dabar Malano Jalwaana area of Wara Mamund tehsil.

On 20 July, four militants were killed in a military operation in Lakrai area of Mohmand District while six were killed in raids throughout Bannu District, six IEDs were also neutralized in Bannu District. Three Excise Department personnel were abducted from a checkpoint on the Dalbandin–Taftan Highway in Chagai District.

On 21 July, a peace committee member was assassinated by an IED attack in Karrapa area of Hangu District while TTP claimed to have killed two in the Muhammad Khel area of Boya Tehsil. The Wadigram area in Salarzai Tehsil was hit by two mortar shells while insurgents blew up a Government school in Mamund Tehsil.

On 22 July, a TTP insurgent was captured from the Syed Ali Mela Khor area of Kurram District while three were captured from Khyber District, three more were killed in a military operation in Chapri Naryab Chowk area of Hangu District.

On 23 July, insurgents ambushed and killed a Police Constable near Moula Khan Sarai in the Sarwekai area of South Waziristan District. Four TTP militants were killed and five captured in a military operation in Talgai mountains of Wazir Tehsil, while two militant hideouts were destroyed in the Sipah Tandi Kalay area of Bara. Three Pakistani soldiers from the 114th Brigade were killed in a roadside bombing in Mamad Gat of Safi Tehsil.

On 24 July, Afghanistan Freedom Front attacked Taliban border posts in Zabek District claiming to have killed 21 Taliban fighters and wounded 37, as well as claiming to have gained control of the area. The Taliban confirmed the attack took place and said that the infiltrators came from Chitral District in Pakistan. A customs official was killed and two wounded in an insurgent attack along the Indus Highway in Kohat District. TTP conducted a major attack on a joint security post in Manji Khel, Tank District killing soldiers and two Policemen as well as a former Forest Department official whereas 12 militants were killed in military retaliation. Four Special Operations Group personnel were injured in a grenade attack in Doaba area of Hangu District while another grenade attack tool place in Sararogha Tehsil. A TTP quadcopter strike on Speena Mena Police Check Post in the Hassankhel injured three policemen.

On 25 July, three TTP insurgents and a suicide bomber were killed in a foiled suicide attack on a military post in South Waziristan District. Two TTP militants were killed in a military operation in the Khoi Bahara area of Kulachi Tehsil. Insurgents destroyed a Girls Middle School in the Shah Hassan Khel area of Lakki Marwat District, they also attacked a village volleyball tournament in the Nandor area of Tank District wounding four civilians. CTD captured an alleged Afghan TTP militant from Hyderabad District.

On 26 July, a mortar strike from Afghanistan on Zamchan in South Waziristan killed a woman and imjured two children. A TTP militant was killed in a skirmish in Regi Model town of Peshawar while two dead bodies of TTP militants were recovered from Bannu District. Militants attacked the Gandak border post of the 133 Wing of the SWS Brigade in Azam Warsak area of South Waziristan killing three FC soldiers. Two civilians were injured in a militant drone strike on Hadi village of Mirali. Two soldiers were killed and one was wounded in an IED attack in Spinwam.

On 27 July, a quadcopter strike on a mosque in Birmal Tehsil killed a cleric and wounded two. A joint counterterrorism operation was started in the border hill tracts of Abdul Khel, Shah Hassan Khel, and Hayat Khel area of Lakki Marwat District forcing insurgents to flee while a senior TTP commander was also killed in the Wanda Semo area. An off-duty FC soldier was killed in the Dildar Garhi area of Charsadda District.

On 28 July, a counter-terrorism operation was launched in the Shalkho Sar area of Swat following the abduction of a Village defense guard while four TTP militants and one Special Operations Team personnel were killed in an operation in the Matta area of Swat District. Insurgents blew up a mosque in the Lachi area of Kohat District. The operation continued in Lakki Marwat with two alleged underground militant bunker and equipment being destroyed. Three soldiers were killed and four wounded in a TTP ambush in the Shoi Khel area of Shawal tehsil.

On 29 July, TTP attacked the Khazina Banda Police checkpost in Hangu District killing nine policemen and wounding 28, while Pakistani forces claimed to have killed 15 insurgents in retaliation. while four FC soldiers were killed in a TTP attack on an FC post in the Musa Darra area of Hassankhel. IGP KP stated that militants in southern district of KP were using weapons left by NATO during withdrawal from Afghanistan.

On 30 July, police forces neutralized a bomb in Muslim Bagh area near Serai Naurang of Lakki Marwat District. Pakistani forces killed a TTP militant in Bajaur District and two in Kulachi area of Dera Ismail Khan District. Insurgents also blew up a government school in Bajaur District.

On 31 July, an Army Major and five TTP insurgents were killed in a military operation in Razmak, 15 Hafiz Gul Bahadur Group insurgents were killed throughout Bannu and one in Loi Mamond area of Bajaur District. Two members of Ahmadzai Aman committee were killed and seven wounded in a militant quadcopter strike in Barganto area of Bannu District while two policemen were killed in an ambush in Chodhwan area of Dera Ismail Khan.

On 1 August, CTD claimed to have captured 54 suspected terrorists in 419 operations throughout Punjab, belonging to ISIS, Al Qaeda, LeJ, SSP and TTP.

On 2 August, 10 civilians and seven Policemen were killed and 34 were wounded in a suicide attack on Kabal Police Station in Swat District, the attack being claimed by TTP. Pakistan blamed Afghanistan for sheltering and facilitating the perpetrators. Pakistani forces under "Operation 11 Garaj" killed 10 TTP militants, eight in the Darbi Khel and Batan areas of Khyber District and two in Shakro area of Bajaur district. Eight more militants of HGB groups were killed in an attempt to infiltrate the Pakistan-Afghanistan border in the Datta Khel area of North Waziristan. Pakistan also claimed to have killed a senior TTP commander, Amir Muawiya during an operation (IBO) in Chapri Naryab area of Hangu District. Two insurgents including a suicide bomber were killed by the military in the Hundi Khel area of Bannu District. An IED attack on a police vehicle in Peshawar wounded two personnel, while an attempted ambush on a police convoy in Boya Tehsil led to no casualties. Taliban said they wanted to ease ties with Pakistan.

On 3 August, a cleric Mufti Jan Mir, was killed in an explosion in Wana, likely carried out by TTP. A mortar strike by militants on a nomadic camp in Ahmadwam area of Sararogha tehsil killed three and wounded five. Police repelled an attempted militant assault on the Kharai Dara Police Post in Ambar tehsil. A TTP insurgent was killed in an operation in Bara Tehsil while two Lashkar-e-Islam insurgents were killed in Bhutan Sharif area of Tirah Valley. Three militants were killed in a military operation in Lakki Marwat District while two were killed in a police encounter in Peshawar. TTP attacked and damaged a United Bank Limited branch in Dallan area of Hangu District kidnapping two employees.

On 5 August, a mortar strike in the Shaktoi Shaga Anay Khel area of South Waziristan wounded a civilian. Three militants were killed in the Ama Khel area of Tank District in a military operation.

On 6 August, Pakistani forces killed eight militants and wounded 15 during precision strikes along the Durand Line, targeting hideouts near the Kalosha, Sierra, and Zulu posts in Kalosha Sector of South Waziristan, Pakistan also warned Afghanistan against sheltering insurgents. Nine insurgents were killed and 16 wounded in the Khatti Kalay area of North Waziristan, one was killed and one wounded in Jani Khel tehsil. Two insurgents and one soldier were killed in an assault near Sarbandah area of Dir District. A planted bomb was defused in Peshawar. Insurgents also attacked a government school in Bajaur District with grenades.

On 7 August, eight more militants were killed during an attempted assault on military positions in Azam Warsak area in South Waziristan. Military operations against the TTP killed nine in Lakki Marwat, while seven militants and an Army Captain were killed in an operation in Hangu District. A drone strike in Bannu District killed two TTP militants while an IED was also defused there, two more insurgents were killed in Upper Dir District.

On 8 August, Pakistani forces killed four TTP insurgents in an operation in Bara area of Khyber District while TTP assassinated a tribal leader in Salarzai. Three civilians were injured in a quadcopter strike in lower South Waziristan.

On 9 August, two drone strikes targeted Pakistani military camps in the areas of Sultan Chiri in Nushki District and Sadda in Kurram District. A 10kg IED was defused by Pakistani BDU in Wana. A policeman was killed and another was injured in a militant attack in Lakki Marwat District while TTP also attacked a police post in Bajaur District using grenades. A quadcopter strike in the Lal Qilla area of Lower Dir District killed a TTP insurgent while two were wounded in a failed attack on Chatikhel police post in Swat District.

On 10 August, an insurgent and a policemen were killed and 10 suspected insurgents were captured in CTD operations in Bannu District, meanwhile two FC soldiers were killed in an IED attack by IMP in North Waziristan and a Badarghah force personnel responsible for providing security to an Oil and Gas Development Company Limited facility was killed by insurgents in Bahram Khel village of Lakki Marwat District. Iranian media alleged that Pakistan was cooperating with ex-Afghan National Army soldiers in mounting an offensive against Baloch separatists.

On 11 August, 10 TTP insurgents were killed and 16 were wounded in operations throughout Bannu District, with two being killed in Janikhel area meanwhile an IED also went off by the roadside in Khanikhel. A quadcopter strike was reported near police lines in Jamrud tehsil, while an ambush in North Waziristan resulted in the death of an FC soldier and wounding of two others.

On 13 August, highly intensive battle and skirmishes took place between Pakistani forces and TTP insurgents including the deployment of helicopters, artillery and mortar strikes and deployment of organized elements and militiamen from surroundings, the clashes started after a failed ambush attempt on a joint military and police convoy heading to Dobando checkpoint, following which Pakistani military sources claimed that 15 insurgents had been killed, the vehicles of DPO and of a PMLN leader leading a militia were damaged by insurgent fire. A wanted TTP commander was killed in a police operation in Bannu District, along with two more insurgents while five insurgents were reported to have been captured. An off-duty FC soldier was killed in an insurgent attack in Bannu. A failed grenade attack was reported at Daudzai Police Station in Peshawar. Afghanistan claimed Pakistan was behind the violence and expansion of republican insurgency in Badakhshan District and that opposition groups held a meeting with Pakistani authorities in Islamabad, establishing an office and had used Chitral Disrtrict as a staging ground for incursions into Afghanistan.

On 14 August, three drones targeting the Nala Kosho police post in Bannu District were intercepted by Pakistani forces, four more TTP drone attacks were reported at Gurguri Police Station, Khurram Police Station and Bahadur Khel Police Post in Karak District, of which three were foiled and one resulted in the wounding of three police personnel. Three more insurgents were killed and several were wounded while six policemen were also injured in operations in Bannu District, and locals from Hathikhel village repelled insurgent advances. An attack on a police post in Bajaur District resulted in the death of one policeman and wounding of another.

On 15 August, two suspected insurgents were captured along with weapons and equipment from Bannu District.

On 16 August, seven TTP insurgents were killed in a military operation in Kharan District, while six more TTP insurgents were killed under "Operation 11 Garaj" in Bajaur District. A policeman was killed in an insurgent attack in Bannu District while the former Afghan National Police chief for Kandahar's 2nd District was assassinated in Quetta. A TTP insurgent, belonging to Mansoor Group was captured in a joint Rangers and CTD operation in Karachi.

On 17 August, eight TTP insurgents insurgents were killed in the mountains between Ziarat and Harnai Districts while one more was killed in Surab District. Nine more TTP militants were killed in KP with seven, including a commander, being killed in Bannu and two in Lakki Marwat. A TTP attack on Maidane Lal Qila post in Upper Dir District was repelled by Pakistani forces.

On 19 August, Pakistani forces conducted two drone strikes against militant hideouts while insurgents attacked a Pakistanu position using a drone, in South Waziristan. TTP also claimed to have cut fiber optic connection lines in South Waziristan. A TTP insurgent was killed in an operation in Bajaur District. Peshawar police PRO was injured in an insurgent attack on his residence.

On 20 August, TTP claimed to have downed a Pakistani drone in Tajori area of Lakki Marwat District.

On 21 August, a policemen was killed in a militant attack in Bajaur District and another in Mardan District. Five IMP insurgents including a commander were killed in an operation in Bajaur District while the house of a wanted TTP commander was destroyed by Pakistani forces in Hangu District. Two military personnel were injured in an insurgent drone strike on a post in South Waziristan, followed by a skirmish. Insurgents also blew up a gas pipeline in Lakki Marwat.

On 22 August, CTD captured 18 insurgents belonging to TTP, ISIS and Al Qaeda in operations throughout Punjab. An ex-Taliban commander who had made peace with Pakistani government was killed in an attack in Lower South Waziristan. Two Lashkar-e-Islam militants were killed by peace committee militiamen in Orakzai District.

On 23 August, a CTD personnel was killed in an attack in Peshawar, while six policemen were injured in a grenade attack there. Three TTP insurgents were killed in a Pakistani operation in upper Dir. A motorcycle based IED was neutralized in Bannu District. Two civilians were injured in a drone attack in South Waziristan.

On 24 August, Pakistani forces repelled an insurgent attack in Khyber district and also captured drones and equipment in a raid in Kurram District.

On 25 August, six TTP insurgents were killed in an operation in South Waziristan District. An insurgent attack on Dog Shpeela Police Post in DI Khan District resulted in the wounding of three policemen and two civilians, while one policeman was injured in an attack in Bannu. Two Afghan associates of a former Afghan National Army commander were killed in an attack in Quetta.

On 26 August, an insurgent attack in upper South Waziristan resulted in one police constable being killed and another person being injured while five tribesmen were abducted by militants from lower South Waziristan, drone flights near military positions were also reported there. Two insurgents were killed in an operation in Bannu District. In Tank District, an insurgent attack on Gomal police station was repelled by police and FC 221 Wing. A grenade attack on Tarnab post in Peshawar, resulted in the wounding of seven people including two policemen. Shah Bagh Police checkpoint in Upper Dir District was set ablaze by insurgents. Pakistan rejected Afghan claims of its forces being present in Badakhshan conflict, while Taliban claimed that resistance fighters had gathered and were operating out of Chitral District.

On 27 August, four JuA insurgents including an Afghan militant were killed in a SWAT team raid by CTD in Peshawar. A TTP insurgent was killed in an operation in Mirali while homes of two insurgents were also destroyed in Upper Dir District. An ex-ANA personnel was killed in Quetta.

On 28 August, four TTP insurgents were killed and one injured in an operation DI Khan, while two more were killed in Bannu District. An IED blast in South waziristan resulted in the death of one peace committee militiaman and wounding of eight more. Skirmishes in Lachi tehsil of Kohat led to one person being injured from a drone strike hitting a mosque. Two children were injured in a bomb blast in Bajaur district.

On 29 August, six policemen were injured in an insurgent attack on a raiding team in DI Khan district, with one later dying. An operation against TTP was launched in Karak District after they blockaded a road.

On 30 August, a TTP commander was killed in an operation in Mohmand District and a wanted insurgent was killed in an encounter Lakki Marwat District, while a tribal leader was injured in an insurgent attack in Bajaur District.

On 31 August, TTP attacked the customs house in Pishin District, the ensuing skirmishes resulted in the deaths of six security personnel and 12 TTP insurgents. An IED attack on a police vehicle in Karak District, resulted in the deaths of one policeman and wounding of six. An ex-commander of Ansar-ul-Islam who had made peace, was assassinated in Peshawar. Two insurgents were killed in a CTD operation in Katlang and a suspected TTP insurgent was killed in a joint CTD-FIA raid in Karachi. Police defused an IED targeting Garaj checkpost in Orakzai District. The vehicle of Miranshah AC was fired upon by insurgents in North Waziristan. Four civilians were injured in a quadcopter strike in the Splay Panra area of Toi Khulla tehsil.

On 1 September, two insurgents were killed in a joint operation in Lakki Marwat District, while one was killed in a failed attack on a security post in DI Khan District. Two children were injured in a drone strike in South Waziristan. An IED was neutralized in Karak District. Afghanistan announced a ban on Pakistani medications.

On 2 September, Pakistani forces killed 15 TTP insurgents infiltrating across the Pak-Afghan border in North Waziristan. Four TTP TTP militants including an Afghan and a commander were killed in a CTD raid in Badaber while two TTP militants were arrested in a raid in Karachi.

On 3 September, three TTP insurgents including TTP governor for Pishin were killed in a UCAV strike in Harnai District, while three more were killed in Bannu District. An insurgent attack on Shadi Khel Police Station in Lakki Marwat District was repulsed by security forces and an off-duty FC soldier was killed by insurgents in Tank District.

On 4 September, a policeman was killed in an insurgent attack in Peshawar, while an SHO was abducted by insurgents in Kurram.

On 5 September, five TTP insurgents were killed in a CTD raid in Bannu while TTP claimed to have killed a CTD personnel in Peshawar. A girl was killed in a quadcopter strike in Kohat District and a government school was destroyed by militants in Tank District. A TTP attack on Darban checkpost in DI Khan district was repulsed by Pakistani forces. Three Afghan security guards were killed and two went missing in Duki District in an attack by TTP.

On 6 September, 12 TTP insurgents were killed in an operation in North waziristan while two more militants and two Pakistani militiamen were killed in skirmishes in South Waziristan, four more insurgents were killed in an operation in Hangu. A drone strike in Kohat led to the death of one civilian.

On 7 September, six suspected insurgents were captured from Matta in Swat District, four insurgents were killed in Kurram District in the operation leading to the recovery of the abducted SHO and another person, while insurgents blew up a BHU in Tank District.

On 8 September, 27 TTP insurgents attempting to infiltrate the Pak-Afghan border were killed by Pakistani forces in North Waziristan while four including an Afghan were killed by Pakistani forces in Kurram District.

On 9 September, a policeman was killed and another was injured in an insurgent attack on a patrol near Shatakai dam. A drone strike took place near an oil and gas facility in Karak District while a girl was killed in a TTP quadcopter strike during an operation in Kohat. Four insurgents were killed and three wounded in a foiled attack on the Anar China checkpost in Hangu District while one more was killed in Lakki Marwat District.

On 10 September, six TTP militants were killed in an operation involving quadcopter strikes in North Waziristan.

On 11 September, two police constables were killed by insurgents, one in Lakki Marwat and one in Bannu District.

On 12 September, Pakistan's Federal Government designated 26 districts of KP as "hard districts" and began providing risk allowance to security and administrative personnel worth 250% of their basic pay. Four insurgents were killed in an operation in Bara tehsil.

On 13 September, a wanted TTP militant was killed in a CTD-Rangers joint raid in Karachi.

On 14 September, an Elite Force personnel was killed by insurgents in Bannu District while an insurgent was killed in Khyber District.

On 15 September, four TTP militants were killed during an operation by Police and Lakki Police Aman Committee in the Saggai. An insurgent was killed and three policemen were injured in an attack on Sri Bahlol police post in Mardan. Two Hafiz Gul Bahadur group militants were killed in a Peace Committee ambush in South Waziristan. A civilian was killed and another injured in an attack in Upper Dir District.

On 16 September, Sra Khawra police post in Peshawar was targeted with a bomb blast resulting in two policemen being wounded, while a police SI was killed in Swabi District.

On 17 September, eight insurgents were killed in operations in Kurram and four more in North Waziristan, where two insurgents were also wounded. In Hangu District, six soldiers and four militants were killed during an operation. A soldier was killed in a skirmish with insurgents in Wana, while TTP claimed to have captured an FC soldier deployed at Ghulam Khan border sector of Pak-Afghan border.

On 18 September, Ittahid-ul-Mujahideen Pakistan militants attacked the Old Police Lines complex in Kohat, resulting in 31 deaths and 103 injuries. Pakistan accused Afghanistan of sponsoring terrorism and intensifies counterterrorism operations against Afghanistan. Following this, exchanges of fire took place between Pakistani and Afghan forces in Teri Mangal. Taliban urged Saudi Arabia to mediate between the two countries. Dead bodies of 4 surrendered TTP insurgents were also found in DI Khan.

On 19 September, eight militants were reported to have been killed in retaliatory and clearance operations following the attack in Kohat, the previous day. Two suspected insurgents were killed in two encounters in Karachi. A grenade attack targeting Sheikhan police post in Peshawar failed, while an attack on Sargah Nala post in Gilgit Baltistan was repulsed by Pakistani forces.

On 20 September, six Pakistani soldiers and nine militants were killed in an exchange of fire in Khyber Pakhtunkhwa at Hangu close to the border. Two TTP insurgents were killed and four were injured in a quadcopter strike in Lakki Marwat District.

On 21 September, Pakistan launched airstrikes on the provinces of Paktika and Kunar in retaliation for the Kohat attack. Kunar's Nurgal district was hit at 4:00 local time, striking a family home and killing three family members and four others. Paktika's Barmal district was hit at 3:00, a shop and an unoccupied house were destroyed in the bombardment. Pakistani authorities denied striking civilians and said the attacks struck militant hideouts perfectly, supposedly killing 28 militants and multiple suicide bombers. These airstrikes also accompanied ground operations by Pakistani forces. ISPR also claimed that 13 TTP militants were killed during an operation in the Shaban area of Quetta District. RFE/RL reported that Pakistan had recruited ex-ANA personnel in paid roles for counter-insurgent operations. Pakistani Defence Minister, Khwaja Asif, alleged that 70-80% of all insurgents in Pakistan were Afghan nationals.

On 22 September, it was reported that several Pakistani Taliban members attempted to cross the border at Kurram from Nangarhar and Paktia in Afghanistan. After being identified by Pakistani troops, they reportedly began firing on Pakistani checkposts. In retaliation, Pakistani troops launched multiple attacks on Afghan checkposts and defensive positions, supposedly causing several to flee. Zazi Aryub district in Paktika also saw skirmishes. A militant commander was killed by SSG in Bannu District, while five insurgents surrendered.

On 23 September, there were supposedly drone strikes inside Pakistan. While Pakistan blamed Afghanistan, Taliban officials denied the use of drones. Eight drones were downed by Pakistani Air defenses near Torkham border while quadcopter strikes targeted Pakistani positions in Kark Kot and Spin Khwara Khula areas of South Waziristan, while TTP released footage of having ambushed a military column near the Pak-Afghan border there as well. Pakistani forces, meanwhile claimed to have conducted operations against Afghan positions in the Kurram Sector. Four TTP militants were also killed in an operation in North Waziristan while a person was killed in a shootout in South Waziristan.

On 24 September, Pakistan carried out airstrikes on 10 sites in Afghanistan. Kandahar, Paktia and Khost were struck and at least four civilians were killed. Afghanistan vowed to respond. The same day, local Afghan sources like Hariyat Media claimed that a Pakistani drone was intercepted over the Garmsir district near a Taliban border brigade position. Pakistan claimed that 13 Afghan Taliban militants were killed in skirmishes over the night of 24 September, a claim which was denied by Afghanistan, Afghan Taliban's 205 Al-Badr Corps claimed to have destroyed a Pakistani post in Spin Boldak. Pakistan denied Afghan claims of its post being destroyed and released footage of strikes on Afghan positions in Gulistan sector of the border. Aral Hathi Khel in Bannu District allegedly came under siege by insurgents using drones and IEDs. A TTP commander was killed in an operation in South Waziristan while two suspected insurgents were killed in an operation in Bannu.

On 25 September, skirmishes took place between Pakistani and Afghan forces in Chaman sector, with the latter trying to infiltrate across the border, the infiltration attempt was foiled and several casualties were inflicted, mortars and drones were also used, at least 14 Afghan Taliban were reported to have been killed in these skirmishes by some reports. Pakistan claimed that TTP had established military training centres in Kunar, Nangarhar, Khost and Paktika with Afghan Taliban joining their ranks. A TTP militant was killed in Bannu District while an FC soldier was killed in a clash in Tirah.

On 26 September, heavy skirmishes were reported along the border in Kurram, Nangarhar and Paktika with gunfire, mortar strikes and artillery strikes being exchanged. A VBIED suicide attack on the Aman Mela police peace committee checkpost in Dera Ismail Khan resulted in the deaths of 12 people and wounding of 35 more, two rescue personnel were further killed as ambulances transporting came under fire by insurgents.

On 27 September, Afghanistan's Defence Ministry claimed that 28 fighters were killed in Nuristan who had crossed the border from Pakistan. The ministry also claimed that most of the fighters were former Afghan government security personnel recruited by ISI. Additionally, claims were made that there were Islamic State fighters among the ranks supported by Pakistani militias. AFF claimed that 37 Taliban had been killed and several wounded in these clashes, moreover they also claimed to have seized territory in Kunar and Nuristan provinces. Clashes between Pakistan and Afghan forces continued into the morning where a woman was killed and a child was injured in a Pakistani mortar strike in Kurram District.

On 28 September, four TTP militants were killed in an operation in DI Khan District. Three traffic policemen were killed by an insurgent attack in Tank District. Two dead insurgents were recovered during an operation in Gulbaz Dehqan area of Lakki Marwat District. Seven security personnel were abducted by insurgents in Kurram District.

On 29 September, Taliban claimed that they had killed 41 Pakistan-backed militants and captured 62, with the fighting in Nuristan coming to an end. A suicide bomber died in a premature detonation in Tank District. 13 TTP insurgents were killed in two different areas in Khyber District of which five were killed in Bara, two more were killed in Chagai, while three more were killed in Mirali, while one was captured from Sahiwal District. Clashes between Taliban and AFF resumed in Nuristan.

On 30 September, an insurgent was killed in an operation in Bara. Afghanistan alleged Pakistani involvement in the clashes in Nuristan, which was later rejected by Pakistan, an official stated that ties with the Taliban had reached a point of no return.

On 1 October, more airstrikes took place. While Pakistan claimed that 22 militants were targeted, Taliban claimed that 9 civilians were killed and 11 others were wounded. Civilian homes in Sheltan district and Garmser district were allegedly targeted. At least three homes were destroyed. Four insurgents were killed in an operation in North Waziristan District. Several insurgent hideouts were destroyed in operations in Karak District, while a joint search and strike operation was started by FC and police in Mohmand District.

On 2 October, seven TTP militants were killed in a military operation in North Waziristan. A policeman was killed and another wounded in an attack in Tank District, another was killed in Peshawar while a peace committee member was killed in South Waziristan. Two drone strikes targeted two Punjab police posts in Taunsa Sharif District. Governor of Kandahar rejected Pakistani claims that a meeting of foreign militants had taken place in the province.

On 3 October, Jhangi and Lakhani Punjab police posts in DG Khan were targeted by TTP using drones, with one personnel being injured. Pakistan claimed to have killed five TTP militants in an operation in South Waziristan while five more were killed in Bajaur.

On 4 October, 15 TTP militants attempting to infiltrate across the Pak-Afghan border in the Ghulam Khan sector were killed by Pakistani forces while eight TTP insurgents were killed in an operation in DI Khan. Three drone strikes on a residential area in South Waziristan led to two civilians being wounded. An insurgent attack on Kangar Bridge Police Checkpost in Bannu District was repelled by Police and local forces, while TTP seized a vehicle from DI Khan.

On 5 October, a Hafiz Gul Bhadur Group TTP militant was killed in a military operation in Tirah while three TTP militants were killed in an operation in DI Khan District. Two insurgents and a peace committee member were killed in a clash in Tank District while two were killed in a police encounter in Bannu District. A child was killed and seven were injured in a quadcopter strike in Mirali. Afghan foreign minister said that the Pak-Afghan disputes can be solved via diplomacy.

On 6 October, five TTP militants were killed and two were injured in a military operation in North Waziristan, three including an Afghan were killed in Tank District while three more were killed in an encounter in Bannu District. Four FBR personnel and one traffic policeman were killed while another traffic policeman was wounded in two separate attacks in DI Khan. A soldier was killed by insurgents in Tirah while a Police post construction site was blown up in Khyber District. Three NGO healthcare workers were abducted from Tank District.

On 7 October, 13 TTP militants were killed in a military operation in North Waziristan. while eight more were killed in Lakki Marwat. An SHO and another policeman were killed in an attack in Tank District while seven policemen were wounded in an insurgent attack targeting the Shadi Pur police post in Kohat District.

On 8 October, nine TTP militants including four commanders were killed in a military operation in North Waziristan. Three policemen went MIA in Nowshehra District A civilian was killed and another injured in an attack in Bajaur District, while insurgents set up blockades in South Waziristan.

On 9 October, seven TTP militants were killed in a military operation in North Waziristan, three TTP-Bhittani militants were killed in a CTD-Police operation in Tank District while a TTP-HGB commander was killed in South Waziristan. Raghzai police station in South Waziristan was targeted in a drone attack, while another quadcopter strike occurred in Lakki Marwat. A school headmaster was abducted from Orakzai District.

On 10 October, clashes took place between Pakistani forces and Taliban's 203 Mansoori Corps in Dand aw Patan Aryob Zazi districts of Paktia, with the Pakistani side launching 14 ballistic missiles and multiple drones targeting several sites. A wanted TTP militant was killed in a peace committee operation in Bannu District, while the Afghan commander of Shamshad group was killed in an interfactional clash in South Waziristan. Two policemen were killed in two separate attacks in Khyber District, claimed by TTP. A rocket strike hit the FC Farhad Camp in Wana, while insurgents blew up a gas pipeline in Lakki Marwat District.

On 11 October, 2026 Khyber Pakhtunkhwa state of emergency was declared. Pakistani forces foiled an infiltration attempt by militants across the border in Kurram District, with 12 TTP militants and one soldier being killed in the skirmishes, while a weapons smuggling attempt across the border was foiled in Pishin District. A TTP militant was killed in a foiled attack on Bomb Disposal Squad in North Waziristan District, while an alleged Army informant was killed by TTP in DI Khan District. Afghan Talian started to construct tunnels and fortifications in multiple provinces bordering Pakistan.

On 12 October, a policeman was killed in an attack in Nowshera District, while six civilians were wounded in a drone strike in DI Khan District. CTD and FIA captured a TTP insurgent from Karachi.

On 13 October, five insurgents including an IMP commander were killed in two operations in Bannu District, while four TTP militants were killed in an operation in Lakki Marwat District. An IED was neutralized in Karak District by police. A child was injured in skirmishes in South Waziristan.

On 14 October, a police constable was killed and two civilians were wounded in an insurgent attack in Bajaur District. Five TTP militants and a soldier were killed in a military operation and an Army captain was injured in an IED attack in Tank District. A TTP militant was killed and another was injured in Lakki Marwat District.

On 15 October, three civilians were killed and five were injured in a mortar strike in South Waziristan during skirmishes between Pakistani forces and TTP. Four TTP militants were killed in Mirali, three in Bajaur and three more alleged TTP militants were killed in Swat District. An FC soldier was abducted from Hangu District.

On 16 October, six TTP militants were captured during operations in Balochistan while four were killed in a drone strike in Chagai District. Ten insurgents were killed by Police and Orakzai Scouts in Orakzai, four were killed and eight injured in Tirah while an HGB commander was killed in Lakki Marwat. A policeman was killed in an insurgent attack on Spina Mela post in Peshawar, and five policemen were wounded in an attack on Gumbati checkpost in Bannu district while a quadcopter struck Tank City Police Station.

On 17 October, Pakistani and Afghan forces clashed in Kurram-Paktia sector with two FC soldiers being killed in the skirmish, however, Afghan Taliban claimed to have killed 13 Pakistani soldiers and wounding six. Pakistani forces launched artillery strikes into Afghanistan's Paktika province with an Afghan Taliban being killed in the skirmishes. Pakistan also claimed to have destroyed an Afghan Taliban base in Kurram sector, killing several Taliban. Taliban also started moving military equipment to Kandahar and Helmand provinces, bordering Pakistan.

On 18 October, an attack on Bara Police Station in Khyber District left one person injured while four insurgents were captured during an operation in Lakki Marwat District.

On 19 October, heavy skirmishes took place between Pakistani and Afghan forces for hours in Paktia province, meanwhile, six insurgents were killed in an operation in Matani near Peshawar while a civilian was killed in Bajaur District.

On 20 October, five TTP-Geedar Group militants were killed in a drone strike in Bannu District, and an insurgent commander was killed in Lakki Marwat. An SHO was assassinated by militants in Miranshah.

On 21 October, five TTP militants were killed in Kurram District, four in North Waziristan and another in Bannu District, several hideouts were destroyed in Lakki Marwat. A civilian was killed in crossfire between military and insurgents in Dera Ismail Khan District.

On 22 October, four policemen and two insurgents were killed in a clash in Karak District, while three TTP militants including an Afghan were killed in an operation in Mirali. TTP ambushed a military patrol composed of three vehicles in Garyum in North Waziristan, as well as a police patrol near Miryan Police Station in Bannu District with gunfire and a VBIED, the latter resulting in injuries to two civilians.

On 23 October, Police claimed to have completed an operation with 14 insurgents killed in Karak District, while a TTP militant was captured from Karachi. Three children were injured in a quadcopter strike in Bannu District.

On 24 October, six TTP militants and two soldiers were killed in an operation in DI Khan District. A TTP commander was killed in Qila Saifullah District and another in Khyber District. An IED targeted a police vehicle in Bannu while Pakistani and TTP forces skirmished in North Waziristan.

On 25 October, a soldier of 3rd Azad Kashmir Regiment was killed in a sniper attack on a security post in South Waziristan while drone strikes targeted a Police post in Badaber and Bagyari Joint Post of the 101 Wing, Khyber Rifles in Khyber District, the former being neutralized. A civilian was abducted by IMP and an IED was neutralized in Lakki Marwat District. A mortar strike in DI Khan led to the deaths of one child and wounding of three civilians.

On 26 October, three militants were killed in an operation in South Waziristan while an attack on Warmando Mela checkpost in Khyber District and a drone strike on Hassankhel Police Station were foiled by police forces. a civilian was killed in a militant drone strike in Bannu District while four were wounded in drone strikes in South Waziristan. Two IEDs were neutralized in Mirali.

On 27 October, Afghan forces struck Pakistani territory in Angoor Ada killing one civilian and wounding five others, Taliban claimed that the skirmishes were targeted after Pakistani strikes on Afghan territory including four drone strikes targeting the deputy commissioner office and military positions in Paktika as well as stating that multiple Pakistani soldiers had been killed or wounded in these skirmishes. An IED attack in Bannu District left one dead and three injured, while a policeman was killed in Mirali.

On 28 October, Pakistani forces engaged multiple Afghan border posts, mortar positions and defensive bunkers with small and heavy weapons, including artillery, following cross-border firing near Angoor Adda a day earlier. Pakistan also claimed that Afghan Taliban had abandoned multiple posts in the area. Pakistan claimed that its forces had destroyed seven Afghan border posts. Skirmishes also took place at the Torkham border crossing. Five militants were killed in an operation in Bannu District and five in DI Khan.

On 29 October, Pakistani forces destroyed the Shakin base of Afghan Taliban with artillery and airstrikes, the Taliban had withdrew 5 kilometres away but the base was struck as they were attempting to reoccupy it. Skirmishes were also reported along the Pak-Afghan border in South Waziristan. Five TTP-Huzaifa group militants were killed in a CTD operation in Mattani. One civilian was killed in an Army drone strike and two civilians injured in separate drone strike in South Waziristan, a military drone was also shot down. Five militants were killed and 16 injured in Tank District while a TTP militant was killed in Kurram District. Two soldiers were killed in an IMP ambush in South Waziristan while TTP killed an alleged Army collaborator in Bannu District.

On 30 October, skirmishes between Pakistan and Afghan forces continued, an Afghan child was killed and four were injured in a Pakistani mortar explosion in Paktika. Three TTP militants were killed and several injured in a drone strike in South Waziristan and another belonging to TTP's Jaish-e-Umari faction was killed in Mirali. In Bannu, a policeman was killed and another was abducted, a policeman was killed in an insurgent attack on Salai Patri post in Bajaur while a constable was killed in Lakki Marwat District with retaliatory operations leading to the deaths of two TTP militants. An insurgent was killed in Bannu District, while a civilian was killed in an insurgent attack on a mosque in Bajaur District.

On 31 October, a policeman was killed and two people were injured in firing outside a courtroom in Lakki Marwat District. Six drone strikes hit the village of Harmuz in North Waziristan while a civilian was killed in another drone strike in Lakki Marwat. Assistant Commissioner of Mansehra was injured in an attack in Nowshera. Two militants were killed in an operation in Orakzai District, while two policemen were injured during the clash. Four insurgents were killed in Lakki Marwat and four in Mohmand District in security forces operations, while TTP claimed to have killed an alleged Army informant in South Waziristan.

On 1 November, Pakistani and Afghan forces skirmished in South Waziristan exchanging fire, with Taliban allegedly leaving behind posts. An Afghan civilian was killed and two were injured in Pakistani rocket strikes on Shikin District in Paktika province. Pakistani and Afghan forces also skirmished at Torkham with te Taliban evacuating a deportee camp due to the clashes. A civilian was injured in a VBIED attack on a police van while three policemen were injured in a quadcopter strike on Bakakhel Tower No. 3, both in Bannu District. TTP shot down a military drone in South Waziristan and destroyed a surveillance camera in Tank District.

On 2 November, two Gul Bahadur Group militants were killed in an operation in North Waziristan and two more were killed in Bannu District. a soldier was killed was killed and another wounded in a drone strike on a camp in Lakki Marwat District. Two police personnel in the security detail of a polio vaccination team were killed and one was injured in Mohmand District while four polio vaccination workers were abducted by insurgents from Tank District, with two being released later. A police vehicle was damaged in an IED attack in Bannu District.

On 3 November, two TTP insurgents including a suicide bomber were killed in a police encounter in Lakki Marwat District, while a third was injured, while two more militants were killed in Tank District by locals. Heavy skirmishes and even airstrikes were reported in Panjpai area of Quetta District. Drone strikes on Malazai Police Station and a nearby FC checkpoint in Tank District resulted in three personnel being injured.

On 4 November, four insurgents were killed in an operation in Bajaur District, three TTP militants were killed in Tank District while a preparing suicide bomber was neutralized in Kurram District. Two civilians were injured in a drone strike in South Waziristan while a polio vaccination supervisor was abducted by insurgents from Jamrud. Yaadgar-e-Shuhada Police Checkpost in Dera Ismail Khan District was attacked by insurgents.

On 5 November, Pakistani and Afghan forces skirmished in the Shaluzan sector of Kurram district, following a TTP infiltration attempt across the border, multiple Afghan posts were damaged in the clashes, an Afghan Taliban was also captured by Pakistani forces in this attempt. an insurgent was killed in a drone strike in Khyber District and another in Bannu District. Four people including a policeman and an FC soldier were abducted by insurgents blockading a road in Lakki Marwat District, while an FC soldier was abducted and later killed in Dera Ismail Khan, a polio vaccination team was also attacked in Mohmand District. A civilian was killed and another injured in two insurgent attacks in North Waziristan.

On 6 November, dead body of a TTP militant was found dumped in Upper Dir District.

On 7 November, a Bomb Disposal Squad member was killed in an IED Explosion in South Waziristan, while a policeman and his son were killed in an attack in Tank District. Four TTP militants were killed in an operation in Bannu District, TTP Quetta intelligence chief was killed in Panjpai after three days of clashes while a Lashkar al-Zil (AQIS) commander was killed in an operation in South Waziristan. A drone strike hit a residential house in Tank District.

On 8 November, four TTP militants were killed in an operation in Khyber District and four more were killed in Bajaur District. An FC soldier was killed in a sniper attack in Tank District and a peace committee member was killed in Kohat. Militant infrastructure and hideouts were destroyed in North Waziristan.

On 9 November, a policeman was killed and three were wounded in an attack by IMP on a police post in Hangu District. Three polio vaccination workers were abducted from Tank District.

On 10 November, Pakistani forces foiled an insurgent infiltration attempt across the Pakistan-Afghanistan border in North Waziristan killing six insurgents while an insurgent died in a premature IED detonation in Tank District.

On 11 November, TTP ambushed police vehicles in Kohat District with the ensuing battle resulting in 10 policemen and 18 insurgents being killed, 12 policemen were injured as well. Two policemen were killed and one injured in an attack on another patrol in Swabi District while a bomb blast targeted the Bandkorai Police Station in Dera Ismail Khan. Four insurgents were killed in a military operation in Bajaur District.

On 13 November, ISPR claimed that Pakistani forces had killed 35 TTP militants in Mir Ali, eight in Orakzai district and 31 militants in Kurram area of Quetta.

== Censorship ==
During the conflict, the Taliban's intelligence agency, the General Directorate of Intelligence (GDI), ordered Afghan domestic media outlets not to cover areas targeted in recent Pakistani airstrikes. In some cases, intelligence personnel monitored media offices and newsroom operations to enforce the directive, and media outlets were warned against defying the order. Taliban intelligence officials also warned residents against publishing images or details of locations in Afghanistan targeted by Pakistani strikes.

Afghan local sources stated that the Taliban were restricting access to information about their own casualties, as well as those among civilians. They added that only Taliban members were allowed to take images of affected areas and victims, making independent verification of casualties and damage difficult. According to the sources, even Taliban controlled media outlets were not allowed to photograph the sites and areas targeted by Pakistan's airstrikes, and there were no accurate statistics on the casualties of civilians and Taliban fighters.

On 1 March, the Taliban suspended the broadcasts of Rah-e-Farda radio and television in Kabul, a channel affiliated with Mohammad Mohaqiq. The suspension was linked to remarks by Mohammad Mohaqiq, which reportedly criticized the Taliban's recent retaliatory attacks against Pakistan. On 5 March, the Taliban increased pressure on local media outlets, warning journalists not to report on attacks, particularly those targeting Taliban military sites. Under the new instructions, domestic media organizations were told not to report the locations or number of Pakistani airstrikes. On 17 March, the General Directorate of Intelligence (GDI) warned local media outlets not to report casualties among Taliban forces from Pakistani airstrikes, saying that doing so could have serious consequences. Afghan Media Support Organization (AMSO) reported that the Taliban had imposed extensive restrictions on the media, including censorship of security-related events, and restrictions on reporting Taliban casualties. It said that journalists had been forced to publish pro-Taliban reports, including during the border clashes with Pakistan, and that their online activities were being monitored.

== Analysis ==
Sultan Ahmad Baheen, former Afghan ambassador to China, suggested that the Pakistani attacks coincided with the 2026 Iran war to minimize international attention on the airstrikes. He claimed that "Pakistan does not want a fully stable and independent Afghanistan" in the long term, but rather a political landscape in Kabul that remains dependent on Islamabad.

Sardar Rahimi, an Afghan researcher in international relations at INALCO, viewed the timing of Pakistan's attacks amid the events in Iran as a strategic opportunity. He suggested that Pakistan, economically and militarily vulnerable in its war with the Taliban, needed US support and saw the attack on Bagram airfield as a projection to US president Donald Trump of Pakistan's alignment with US interests. He stated that Pakistan cannot continue the conflict without US support, and therefore, attacked Bagram airfield for political purposes.

Analysts warned that Afghanistan's drone attacks on Pakistan, targeting garrison cities among other important places, signaled a troubling trend. In response, the government imposed a nationwide drone flight ban and briefly restricted airspace over Islamabad. In Pakistan's security discourse, the focus shifted from the extent of damage caused by drones to concerns over their ability to penetrate deep into the country. This raised questions about potential vulnerabilities in Pakistan's defense preparedness. Abdul Basit, senior associate fellow at the International Centre for Political Violence and Terrorism Research (ICPVTR), stressed that the concern was not the drones' sophistication, but their presence in Pakistan's capital. Taliban drones forced airspace closures and targeted deep within the country, escalating the threat both horizontally and vertically. Hammad Waleed, a research associate at Pakistan's Strategic Vision Institute, stated that while Pakistan's air defense could counter numbered drone projectiles, it would struggle against drone swarms.

== Impact ==
According to the United Nations Office for the Coordination of Humanitarian Affairs (OCHA), the civilian infrastructure in Eastern Afghanistan suffered as a result of hostilities. As of late April 2026, about 19 health facilities were closed, suspended or operating at reduced capacity. About 78,000 people suffered from limited access to healthcare as a consequence. Education services also faced disruptions with more than 13,000 students affected in Kunar and Nangarhar provinces. Water systems were damaged in at least six villages.

Between late February and late April, approximately 100,900 people were displaced across Khost, Kunar, Nangarhar, Nuristan, Paktia, and Paktika provinces. Continuous shelling and unexploded ordnances constrained access for humanitarian operations in some of these provinces.

Death counts, especially the toll on civilians, remained disputed during the course of the conflict. While the Taliban claimed 800 Afghan civilians were killed by April, Pakistan claimed that its forces killed over 640 militants and 850 'facilitators.' According to Azizullah Aziz, a journalist and eastern zone coordinator of the Afghan Journalists Safety Committee, most of the attacks were carried out "at night, during Ramadan."

According to UN Secretary-General's spokesperson Stéphane Dujarric, more than 1,100 civilian casualties were documented in Afghanistan resulting from cross-Durand Line violence by October 2026.

Amid the conflict, the deportation of Afghans from Pakistan continued. According to the International Organization for Migration (IOM) in Kandahar, while the deportations through the Torkham crossing paused in March, repatriations continued through the Spin Boldak crossing.

== Reactions ==
=== Domestic ===
- Afghanistan: Afghanistan's Ministry of Defence condemned the airstrikes, claiming that Pakistan had "hit a religious school and residential homes". Foreign Minister Amir Khan Muttaqi said Afghanistan was "facing an imposed war" from Pakistan. Taliban spokesman, Zabihullah Mujahid, said Afghanistan had not initiated the conflict with Pakistan and that its forces were acting only in self-defence. He also stated that Taliban forces were not violating Pakistani territory and were responding only to protect the population.
  - Afghanistan Freedom Front: The Afghan Freedom Front said the Taliban had moved Pakistani Taliban militants into government buildings and crowded civilian areas, accusing them of using civilians as human shields. The Front also criticized the Taliban for secrecy and propaganda amid Pakistani attacks, condemned civilian killings, called for an independent international investigation, and urged Afghans not to be misled by Taliban messaging.
  - National Resistance Front: Ahmad Massoud said Pakistan's strikes were a consequence of Taliban policies, accusing the group of sheltering the Pakistani Taliban, Al-Qaeda, and other militant organisations and turning Afghanistan into a centre of regional insecurity. At the same time, he rejected foreign military attacks and political deals with the Taliban, arguing that Afghanistan's freedom and any lasting solution must come from the Afghan people themselves through a coordinated and legitimate national effort. Fazel Ahmed Manawi, a senior NRF leader praised Pakistan for its air operations and voiced support.
  - Afghan United Front: Sami Sadat, a former Afghan army commander, described the agreement between tribal elders from eastern Afghanistan and Pakistan's Chitral region as a humiliation, saying that Afghans had been reduced to seeking security for their villages and districts from the Pakistani military. He called the situation a historic disgrace brought about by the Taliban.
- Pakistan: Pakistan's Minister of Defence Khawaja Asif declared an "open war" between the two countries.

=== International ===
==== Nations ====
- India: Randhir Jaiswal, the official spokesperson of the Ministry of External Affairs, expressed strong condemnation of the strikes and expressed support for Afghanistan's sovereignty and territorial integrity.
- Qatar: Qatari foreign minister Mohammed bin Abdulaziz Al Khulaifi discussed with Pakistani Foreign Minister Muhammad Ishaq Dar ways to reduce tension between Pakistan and Afghanistan, thereby strengthening security and stability in the region.
- Russia: The Russian government offered to mediate the situation and urged both nations to halt cross-border attacks.
- Saudi Arabia: Prince Faisal bin Farhan and officials in the Pakistani government discussed ways to reduce regional tensions during a phone call.
- United States: The White House stated that it will continue to monitor the situation closely and expressed support for Pakistan against the Taliban attacks. US president Donald Trump praised both Shehbaz Sharif and Asim Munir for fighting against Taliban forces.

In addition, Bangladesh, China, Egypt, Iran, Iraq, Jordan, Malaysia, and Uzbekistan also called for a ceasefire to end hostilities and promoted dialogue to resolve border tensions.

==== Supranational ====
- United Nations: UN Assistance Mission in Afghanistan (UNAMA) urged both nations to cease hostilities and to take steps to prevent harm to civilians. Richard Bennett, the UN Special Rapporteur on the situation of human rights in Afghanistan, expressed concern over airstrikes in Nangarhar and Paktika, calling on the belligerent parties to exercise "maximum restraint". He stated deep concern for "a significant number of children and civilians" who were killed following the hostilities. Bennett, while calling for accountability over civilian deaths resulting from the conflict, also called on International Criminal Court to consider investigating the alleged attacks across the Durand Line and stated that Pakistani airstrikes that killed Afghan civilians may constitute war crimes.
- European Union: In a brief statement, the EU Council called on all actors for immediate de-escalation and a halt of hostilities in the area. It reiterated to the Taliban that Afghan territory must not be used to threaten or attack other countries and calls on them to take effective action against all terrorist groups operating in or from Afghanistan.

== See also ==
- 2021 anti-Pakistani protests
- 2022 Pakistani airstrikes in Afghanistan
- Deportation of undocumented Afghans from Pakistan in 2023
- War on terror
- Insurgency in Balochistan
- Insurgency in Khyber Pakhtunkhwa
