= Shash Darak =

Coordinates: 34°32′N 69°11′E

Shash Darak شش درک
- Neighborhood of Kabul
- Country: Afghanistan
- Province: Kabul

Shash Darak (Dari: شش درک) is a neighborhood located in District 2 of Kabul, Afghanistan, and includes some of the more important buildings in Kabul, including the palace, the headquarters of NATO-led forces in Afghanistan, the Afghan Defence Ministry and the CIA's Afghan station. The headquarters of KHAD, the Democratic Republic of Afghanistan’s intelligence agency, was also located in Shash Darak Centre.

== See also ==
- Neighborhoods of Kabul
