= Aral Hathi Khel =

- Town and union council
- Country: Pakistan
- Province: Khyber-Pakhtunkhwa
- District: Bannu District

Government
- Time zone: UTC+5 (PST)

Aral Hathi Khel is a town and union council in Bannu District of Khyber-Pakhtunkhwa.
