= Girdi Kas =

Village in Nangarhar Province, Afghanistan

Girdi Kas (Pashto: ګردي کس) is a village located in the Bihsud District of Nangarhar Province in Afghanistan, located around 18 km from the provincial capital Jalalabad. It covers an area of almost 2.2 square kilometers. The village is linked to the Torkham-Jalalabad highway, the Rodat district, and to Samarkhil, also a village within Bihsud District. The Kunar River flows to the north side of the village.

== Demographic Information ==
The village is divided into three sub-areas (Wahdat, Girdi Kas elay and Dag Kelay). The total population of the village is around 7,410. The adult population (aged 15 and above) are 3,920 (1890 male and 2030 female). Children (aged less than 14) are 3,490 (1,660 boys and 1830 girls). The numbers of households in Girdi Kas is estimated 920 households Girdi Kas villagers are 100% Pashtun. The population of two sub-areas (Girdi Kas Kelay and Girdi Kas Dag Kelay) is from Mohmand tribe, and the people of Wahdat sub-areas are Pashtun tribes (320 families) from Mohmand. 80 families from Khugyani, 400 families from Shinwari, with a few others (120 families) from other Pashtun groups.

== Socio-economic Facilities ==
There is only one primary school with 6 classrooms. The Girdi Kas Primary School located in Girdi Kas Dag Kaly sub-areas has a total of 350 students (114 girls and 236 boys) and 6 male teachers. Approximately 100 children commute to middle-level schools in neighboring Kama District, but the distance and time and cost needed for commuting prevent more children to seek post-primary education. There is no health facility in the village which the people are going for the treatment to the neighbors’ districts nearest clinics. According to UNHCR survey, the most common diseases in the village are diarrhoea, typhoid, and malaria. When the nearest CHC does not provide the satisfactory service, the villagers choose to travel to city hospitals in Jalalabad or to Peshawar, of Pakistan.

The vast majority of the village people uses shallow well for the potable water. Most of the community people have their own open latrines and bathrooms. The source of irrigation water is Kumar-Kabul River. It is reported that irrigation water becomes scarce, due to River water flow change, from September to March. The villagers have a traditional water management system. In water-lacking season the farmer are irrigating their land by rotation. The total agricultural area is about 450 ha which 330 ha is irrigating by the local made intake and the rest is still under the treating of seasonal floods which not irrigating regularly. Agriculture and animal husbandry are the primary livelihood activities inside Girdi Kas Village, followed by small-numbered other jobs such as shop keeping and governmental employment. However, there are not enough job opportunities in the village therefore the men are seeking for daily labor outside the village. Most of the young people of the community migrate to other cities to work in order to earn money for their families. As to the differences within the village, Wahdat sub-areas people suffer more from joblessness. Although this sub-area has the biggest male population and the percentage of working people is less.

Prior to the prolonged conflict, Girdi Kas was famous for its agricultural production. Unfortunately, the village is yet to recover its previous abundant crop. According to the respondents in the village, the volume of agricultural production is not satisfactory. There is no major selling place (such as market and bazaar) for the village's crops nearer than Jalalabad. Most crops are sent and sold in Jalalabad. The commercial activities within the village are very modest. There are approximately 25 small shops in the village, which serve for the residents’ everyday life, although too small in scale to be called an industry.

== Local Institution of Water Management ==
In Girdi Kas village has a tribal shura with 16 members, led by a landlord. The shura has functioned as the mediating body of the in-village problems and conflicts. Each of the three sub-areas has a male Community Development Council (CDC) that functions as a receptor body of outside support from aid communities and government. The village has a water management system run by Mirab.

== See also ==
- Nangarhar Province
