= 2026 Kabul hospital airstrike =

2026 Pakistan Air Force airstrike on a rehab center in Kabul, Afghanistan

- Part of 2026 Afghanistan–Pakistan War
- Location within Afghanistan
- Location: Kabul, Afghanistan
- Date: 16 March 2026 c. 09:00 p.m. (AFT, UTC+04:30)
- Attack type: Airstrike
- Deaths: 408+ (per Afghanistan); 269+ (per UNAMA)
- Injuries: 265+ (per Afghanistan); 122+ (per UNAMA)
- Perpetrator: Pakistan Air Force

On 16 March 2026, Omid Addiction Treatment Hospital, (Note: Omid (امید) means "hope" in Dari Persian and Pashto.) a drug rehabilitation center in Kabul, Afghanistan, was destroyed amid airstrikes carried out by the Pakistan Air Force during the 2026 Afghanistan–Pakistan War. Hospital officials working at the center said that about 3,000 people were treated there and estimated the casualties to be in hundreds, most of them patients. According to Afghan authorities, the attack killed at least 408 people and injured another 265. News reporters, international NGOs and emergency responders also confirmed that more than 100 people had been killed. The United Nations Assistance Mission in Afghanistan (UNAMA) said that the airstrike had killed at least 269 people and injured at least 122 others and that the actual number of casualties was likely higher.

The Afghan government claimed that the facility was directly targeted by an airstrike carried out by the Pakistan Air Force, a statement supported by UNAMA and the Human Rights Watch, who further declared it a possible war crime. Pakistani officials admitted to carrying out airstrikes in Kabul, but denied targeting the facility, stating that its air force struck military sites nearby. The airstrike was the deadliest strike on civilians in Afghanistan since 2021.

== Airstrike ==
At around 9 p.m. local time, an airstrike destroyed the Omid Addiction Treatment Hospital (or the Support and Treatment Center, Omid). Large sections of the hospital, including five blocks of the rehabilitation compound, were left completely destroyed. The main 180-foot-long destroyed building included a prayer and meal hall and housed around 500 patients at the time of the strikes, its roof collapsing due to the strikes; adjacent buildings each containing 20 to 30 bunk beds also caught fire including a teenage ward housing approximately 40 to 50 young patients, none of whom survived with the United Nations describing it as the "complete destruction of one block that housed adolescents receiving drug treatment." Container housing units south of the main building, housing around 50 patients at the time, were also destroyed amid intense fires. Most of the victims were patients. Omid Stanikzai, a security guard at the drug treatment center, who witnessed fighter jets bombing the site said that the fighter jets dropped the bombs after being fired upon by Afghan forces. Another injured victim, also witnessed the plane first firing at the hospital and then circling back around to bomb it. Maiwand Hoshmand, a doctor who worked at the facility, said that patients had just finished dinner and some were at a Ramadan congregational prayer when jets hit three parts of the facility.

A spokesperson of the Afghan government said the death toll was suspected to be 408 people with 265 people injured. According to the Afghan health ministry's spokesman, Sharafat Zaman Amarkhail, there were no military facilities near the hospital.

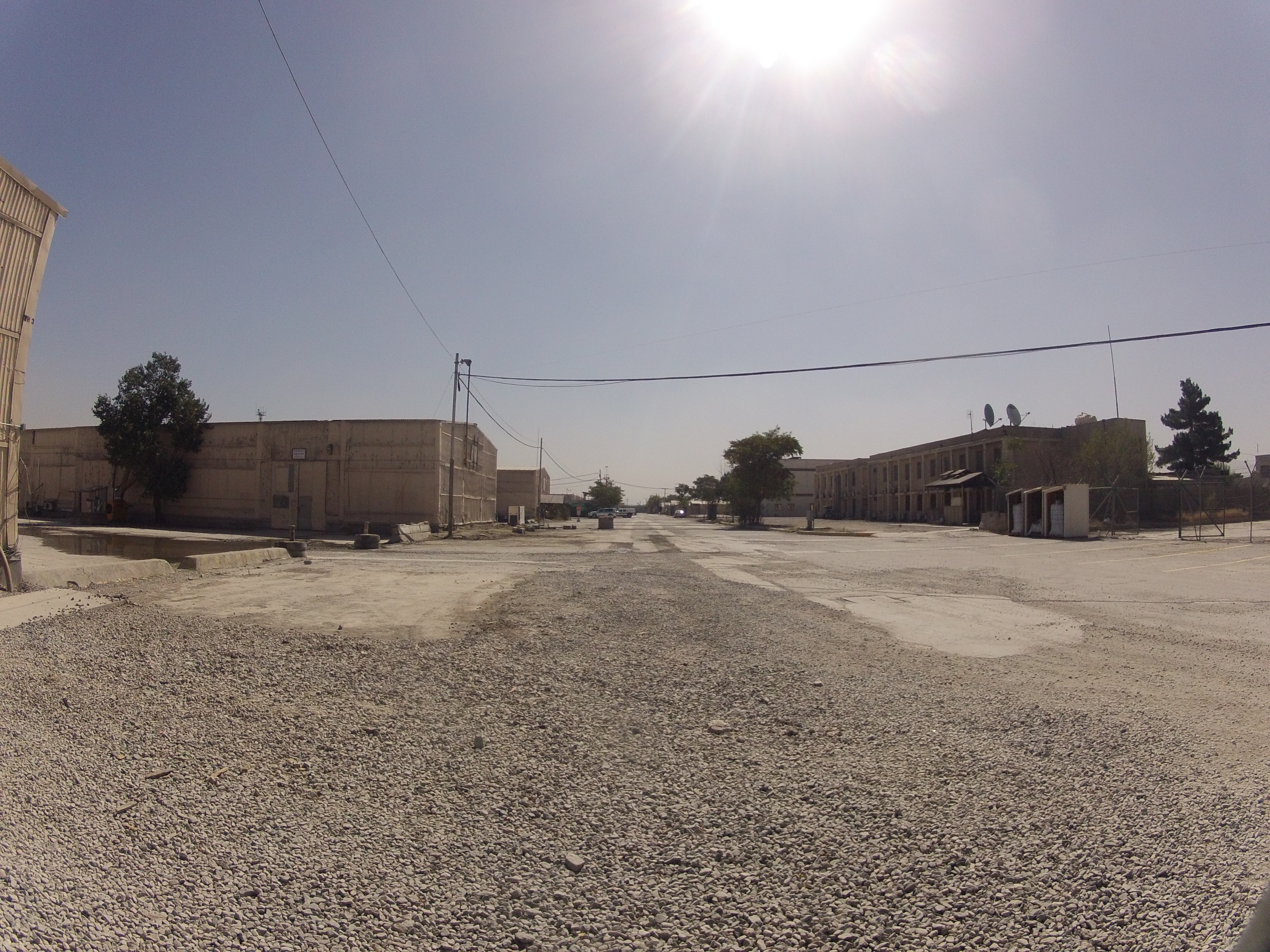
View of Camp Qargha in 2014, prior to its conversion into a drug rehabilitation facility.

The hospital was located in the Hootkhail area of Kabul's District 9, in the eastern part of the city. It was in the former U.S. military base Camp Qargha (formerly Camp Phoenix) which had been converted into a drug rehabilitation centre under the Ministry of Labor and Social Affairs about a decade ago and was transferred to the Ministry of Interior Affairs after the Taliban takeover. It served people across Kabul.

Facilities inside the former military base have also reportedly been used by the Taliban to manufacture small combat drones. Though The New York Times said that post-strike imagery showed "no sign of weapons, ammunition or military equipment in the targeted building." Jacopo Caridi, Norwegian Refugee Council's Afghanistan head, said that he had seen no military facilities in the immediate area. The strike was declared unlawful and a possible war crime by the Human Rights Watch.

Pakistani information minister Attaullah Tarar claimed that no civilian facilities were targeted, saying the Pakistani strikes hit "military installations in Kabul" and further claimed that the Omid Addiction Treatment Hospital in Camp Phoenix was located several kilometers from the original target site and that secondary explosions from stored ammunition explained the observed effects. Sky News, in its analysis of official Pakistani footage of the strikes, said that at least four buildings were hit with guided aerial bombs in targeted strikes by Pakistan on the facility in Kabul with extensive damage seen in an aftermath drone video. Trevor Ball, a conflict researcher with Bellingcat, geolocated the strikes to buildings of the rehab center. A photo from Afghanistan National Disaster Management Authority also showed significant damage to the rehab center. Human Rights Watch said that its analysis of the official Pakistani video footage and of subsequent satellite images, actually confirmed the targeted destruction of the rehab centre including its main and adjacent buildings (the latter housing upto 450 patients) and nearby container units. It added that its analysis of post strike video footage showed "no indication of secondary detonations" by ammunitions or explosives saying that the facility did not have enough space to segregate and store bulk ammunitions.

A senior Pakistani military official, who spoke with the New York Times on the condition of anonymity, said that Pakistan was aware of the former military base being converted to a rehab center years ago but had military intelligence that the broader compound housed facilities for drone storage and suicide bombers. According to Amu TV, Baheer Center, the reported drone production site, is located north of the rehabilitation center and was not hit, nor were the Afghan Police recruitment center and military hangars beside it. It said that the Pakistani strikes had dropped at least 3 bombs all of which hit the rehabilitation compound, including the main building and container housing units south of it.

The hospital was originally built with 1,000 beds but was reportedly exceeding its capacity in 2023 amid Taliban's crackdown on the drug addiction crisis in Afghanistan, cramming up to 3,000 patients. The Afghan Times reported that hundreds of patients were undergoing treatment at the 2,000-bed hospital at the time of the airstrikes. Amu TV said that there were 800 to 850 people in the compound at the time of the strikes. The Afghanistan government said that 491 people were rescued, which Radio Free Europe/Radio Liberty said would bring (along with the 408 were killed and 265 injured) the total number of people present to 1,164.

AFP and the BBC reporters counted at least 30 dead bodies while medical teams worked at ground zero at around 10 p.m. local time. The New York Times said that a reporter counted at least 80 bodies among the rubble and in body bags. A fleet of ambulances were also witnessed. A radiology department worker stated that very few of the patients living in containers on campus could survive the strike and everyone died where the bombs were dropped. A patient later recounted that everyone was inside the wards when the explosion happened. According to Amu TV around 200 people were killed in the strikes.

Officials at the destroyed hospital said that more than 50 bodies were still believed to be trapped under the debris amid rescue operations the next day with thousands from the families of victims searching for them. Many of the wounded were treated at Wazir Akbar Khan Hospital. Najibullah Farooqi, the head of Wazir Akbar Khan's Forensic Medicine Department, said that the department had received 98 bodies most of which had been identified. Other victims, including 3 dead and 27 wounded, were taken to the Kabul Emergency Hospital which is run by the Italian medical NGO Emergency. Morgues across Kabul were overwhelmed with bodies of the victims. The department later told the BBC that it had received the bodies of more than 100 people who had been killed in the strikes with some bodies injured beyond recognition. Afghanistan's poor forensic infrastructure further rendered body identification of the dead difficult.

The Norwegian Refugee Council (NRC) stated that its staff had seen large numbers of casualties when they visited the hospital next morning and found hundreds of civilians dead and injured. NRC's Caridi said that the "numbers are in the hundreds".

The United Nations Assistance Mission in Afghanistan (UNAMA) stated that the airstrike was carried out by the Pakistan Air Force, and confirmed the killing and wounding of at least 269 and 122 respectively noting that the actual number of casualties was likely higher.

== Aftermath ==
Mohammad Nabi Omari, Afghan deputy interior minister, urged families of the victims to bury the dead in a single cemetery as a symbolic gesture. Many of the dead, including unidentified victims, were later mass buried at the Badam Bagh Hill Cemetery in Sarai Shamali, Kabul.

The Afghan government announced a compensation of 600,000 Afghan afghanis for the families of the victims.

On 18 March, Pakistan announced a 5-day pause in hostilities on the occasion of Eid al-Fitr saying it had been requested to do so by Saudi Arabia, Qatar and Turkey. Afghanistan also followed with a temporary pause of its military operations. The New York Times said that Pakistan's pause came amid growing pressure from international agencies and foreign governments against Pakistan for strikes at the rehab center.

The destruction of Kabul's main drug rehab centre left many former patients and other drug addicts without access to healthcare facilities, leading to calls for the construction of a new centre.

== Reactions ==
=== Afghanistan ===
Zabihullah Mujahid, deputy information minister of Afghanistan, stated that the Afghan government considers "such an act to be against all accepted principles, and a crime against humanity." Suhail Shaheen, head of the Political Office of Afghanistan, too called it a crime against humanity and stated that Pakistan would get a "response in their language." Naseer Faiq, Afghanistan's permanent representative to the United Nations, said that targeting hospitals and civilians was a clear violation of international law and may constitute a war crime. He added that "UNAMA must conduct an impartial investigation and publish the results transparently." Ziaul Haq Amrkhil, an adviser to the president in the former Afghan government, added to the call for a UNAMA investigation. Abdul Salam Zaeef, former Afghan ambassador to Pakistan, said that the attack was exactly like the 'actions of the Israeli regime in Gaza' and must be condemned internationally.

Former Islamic Republic of Afghanistan officials including former Chief Executive Abdullah Abdullah, former head of Afghanistan's National Security Council Rahmatullah Nabil, former foreign minister Haneef Atmar and former ambassador to Pakistan and former finance minister Omar Zakhilwal among others condemned the attack by Pakistan. Nabil said that targeting civilians was a clear example of disregard for human life and a blatant violation of humanitarian principles and that no country could achieve security through the killing of civilians. Zakhliwal said that "Such hateful and violent aggression will not reduce the existing insecurity or security threats against Pakistan; on the contrary, it will worsen insecurity and violence further."

Former Afghan president Hamid Karzai, who resides near the site of the bombing, said that his house filled with smoke and dust and shook from the impact. He condemned the attack calling it a violation of international law and accused the Pakistani government of promoting "anarchy and weakness" in Afghanistan to ensure the country was "downtrodden", saying that Pakistan was disinterested in having a "civilized relationship" with Afghanistan. He added that "The government of Pakistan has not been able to live with any Afghan government, they didn't do this well with the government and the monarchist regime in Afghanistan and then the Republic and then, subsequently other governments and then the Republic again, during my time in office, I went there 20 times to seek a better relationship."

Afghan cricketer Rashid Khan, called it a war crime and said that the "sheer disregard for human lives, especially during the holy month of Ramadan, is sickening and deeply concerning" while calling upon the UN and human rights agencies to investigate. Other Afghan cricketers including Mohammad Nabi, Naveen-ul-Haq, Rahmanullah Gurbaz, Ibrahim Zadran, Hashmatullah Shahidi and Qais Ahmad also condemned the attack by Pakistan. Haq said "It is hard to find any difference between Israel and the Pakistani regime."

=== Pakistan ===
Pakistan's Minister of Information & Broadcasting (MoIB) Attaullah Tarar rejected Afghanistan's allegations that the hospital was deliberately targeted. He said the Pakistani Air Force had only carried out "precise, deliberate, and professional" strikes on "military installations and terrorist support infrastructure", including "technical support infrastructure and ammunition storage facilities at two locations in Kabul" and that strikes on the day in Kabul and Nangarhar Province were "precise and carefully undertaken to ensure no collateral damage is inflicted". Tarar added that the visible secondary explosions indicated the presence of a large ammunition depot and that "no hospital, no drug rehabilitation center, and no civilian facility were targeted."

On 19 March, Director General of Inter-Services Public Relations Lieutenant General Ahmed Sharif Chaudhry also denied attacking the hospital, saying the strikes targeted ammunition depots, drone storage and technical installations and that secondary explosions resulted in fires at the hospital. He added that Pakistan "had no animosity towards the people of Afghanistan" and had only sought to ensure that Afghan soil was not used against Pakistan. However, several organizations confirmed that the targeted site was indeed a drug rehabilitation centre with the BBC having reported from there back in 2023, Sharif still justified the strikes terming drug addicts and patients as "suicide bombers."

Manzoor Pashteen, a leader of Pashtun Tahafuz Movement (PTM) in Pakistan, condemned the attack by Pakistan saying it had killed hundreds of innocent civilians. He said that PTM would raise the voice of the victims worldwide.

=== International ===
Lin Jian, spokesperson of the Ministry of Foreign Affairs of China, said that the attack raised serious concerns over high civilian casualties.

India condemned Pakistan's strikes on Afghanistan as a massacre. Parvathaneni Harish, Permanent Representative of India to the United Nations, condemned Pakistan's strikes on Afghanistan in the month of Ramadan. The Ministry of External Affairs called it an "inhumane act of violence that claimed the lives of numerous civilians in a facility that cannot be justified as a military target." It called the attack a violation of Afghanistan's sovereignty and said that the international community must hold Pakistan accountable.

The Norwegian Ministry of Foreign Affairs and Jan Egeland, secretary-general of the Norwegian Refugee Council, both expressed concern. The foreign ministry saying that medical facilities and patients should never be targeted and Egeland said that obligations under international humanitarian law should be upheld to ensure the protection of civilians.

Zalmay Khalilzad, former U.S. Special Representative for Afghanistan, condemned the attack saying that the "massacre of Afghan civilians is the result of barbaric Pakistani air attacks on Kabul. The Afghan people are understandably outraged and the Afghan government is withdrawing its offer of negotiations." He urged the international community to denounce it and provide humanitarian assistance to the victims and added that, "I also hope that many conscientious Pakistanis will be unhappy and even angry at their military leadership's inhumane and reckless decision, which has led to the killing and injury of Afghan civilians. Unfortunately, as recent developments in Pakistan show, the military leadership and its proxy government do not value public opinion.".

==== International organizations ====
UNAMA said that "Under international law, all parties to a conflict must respect and protect the sick and wounded, medical personnel, hospitals and ambulances and attacks on hospitals and civilian facilities are strictly prohibited." It added that during the war, and prior to the attack on the rehab centre, it had documented the deaths of at least 76 Afghan and injuries of 213 civilians.

Thameen Al-Kheetan, spokesperson for the Office of the United Nations High Commissioner for Human Rights (OHCHR) called for an independent investigation into the strike, saying that those responsible must be "held to account in line with international standards", stating "victims and victims' families are entitled to reparations". He added that "under international humanitarian law, civilians and civilian objects are strictly protected". The OHCHR further noted that 289 Afghan civilians, including 104 children and 59 women, had been killed since beginning of the conflict in February.

Tedros Adhanom Ghebreyesus, the World Health Organization chief, urged a prioritization of peace saying that "at least six health facilities" in Afghanistan had reportedly been impacted straining its healthcare system.

The European Union said that attacks on civilians and medical facilities violated international humanitarian law, including the Geneva Conventions and called for an immediate reduction in the harm to civilians.

Human Rights Watch called the Pakistani airstrike an "unlawful attack and a possible war crime" and "unlawfully indiscriminate". It said that "Pakistan has an obligation under international law to investigate alleged war crimes by its forces and bring those responsible for serious abuses to account" and added that "concerned countries should press Pakistan to provide genuine accountability and ensure that failures in intelligence, target verification, and decision-making are identified and fixed so such strikes never happen again."

Amnesty International said "While the total death toll from this attack has yet to be independently verified, it’s clear that it resulted in a significant number of deaths and injuries to civilians, at least in the hundreds". Responding to Pakistan's claim that it hit an ammunition depot and not the rehab centre, Amnesty said that "It's well-documented that a large part of Camp Phoenix, a former NATO camp, had been operating as a drug rehabilitation facility since 2016. Pakistan’s military should have taken all feasible precautions to spare civilians and civilian objects before launching this strike. Any reasonable assessment and information gathering would have concluded that the camp had a high civilian presence. Even if an ammunition depot was present inside the wider camp, the decision to attack should have been weighed against any excessive harm that it was likely to cause to civilians." It called for an independent public investigation by Pakistani authorities into the attack and resultant civilian casualties. In July 2026, Amnesty announced that after "reviewing more than 60 photographs and videos and 30 satellite images" in a four-month long investigation, it found no evidence that could support Pakistan's claim that the target was a military facility. Additionally, it called for a probe and stated that the incident be investigated as a "possible war crime." The organisation also concluded that the strikes "violated the special protection afforded to healthcare facilities under international humanitarian law (IHL)."

== See also ==
- Kunduz hospital airstrike – 2015 U.S. air strike on a hospital in Afghanistan
- September 2025 Tirah airstrike – Pakistani airstrike in Tirah.
- Civilian casualties in the war in Afghanistan (2001–2021)
