= Camp Qargha =

Afghan National Army facility

Camp Qargha
- Kabul in Afghanistan

Site information
- Type: Camp

Location
- Shown within Afghanistan
- Coordinates: 34°31′31″N 69°10′42″E

Site history
- Built: 2009
- In use: 2021

Camp Qargha was an Afghan National Army facility which was home to its Officer Academy. The Afghan Army was supported by mentors from the United Kingdom, Australia, New Zealand and Denmark. The facility was located in Kabul, about six miles (9.6 km) from the Hamid Karzai International Airport (HKIA). Camp Qargha was later used to treat drug addicts. In 2026 it would become the central topic of an airstrike.

== Units ==
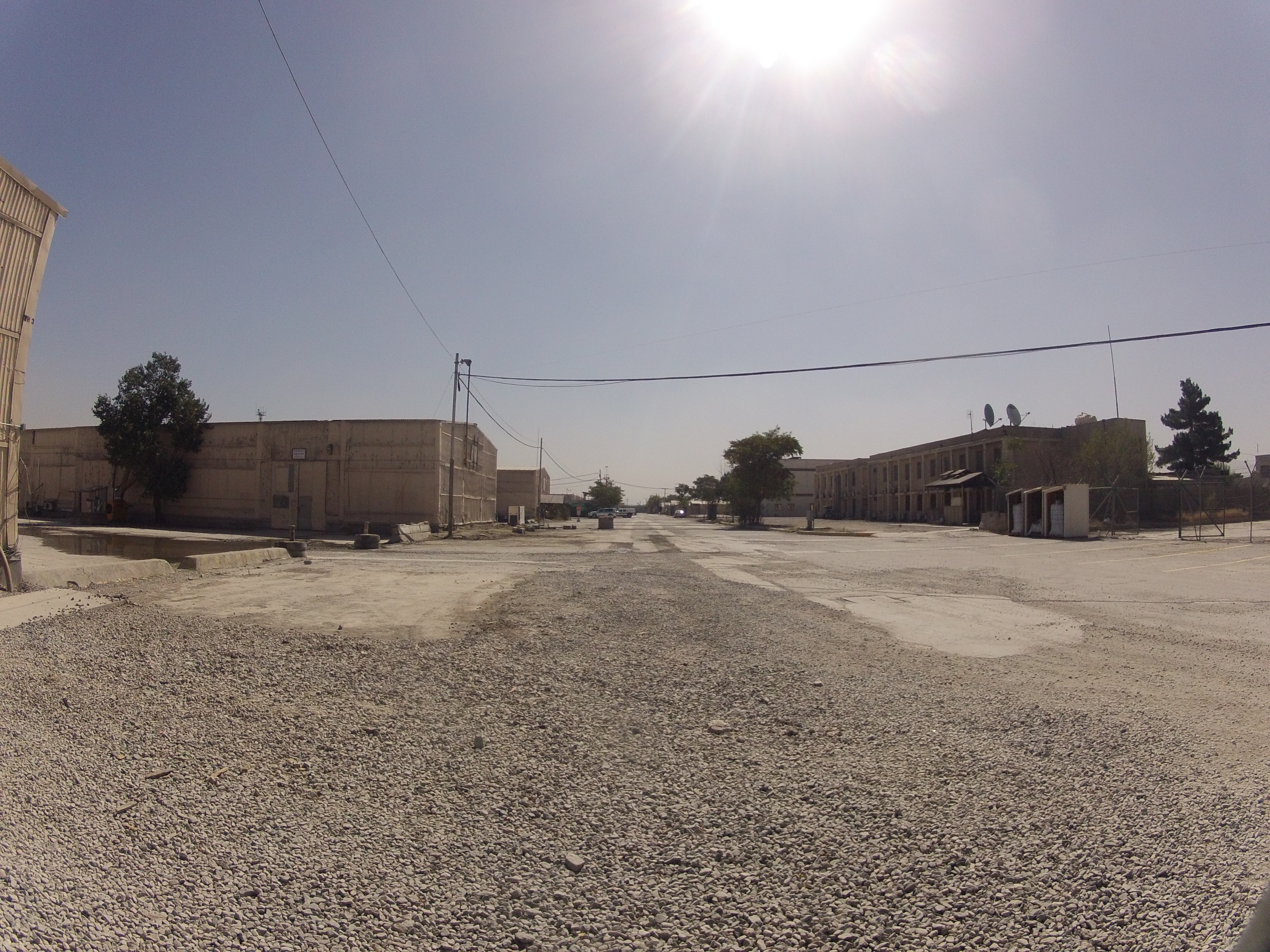
View of Camp Qargha in 2015, prior to its conversion into a drug rehabilitation facility

- Combined Joint Task Force Phoenix / 33rd Infantry Brigade Combat Team during February 2009
- 2nd Battalion, 130th Infantry Regiment during February 2009
- 2nd Battalion The Royal Regiment of Scotland (2015-16)
- Quebec Company, 2nd Battalion, Yorkshire Regiment (2018)
- 4th Battalion The Royal Regiment of Scotland (2020)
- 6th Royal Australian Regiment (2018-19)
- Australian Mentoring Team
- Afghan Garrison Support Unit
