= Hangu District =

Hangu District may refer to:

- Hangu District, Tianjin, a former district in Tianjin Municipality, China
- Hangu District, Pakistan, a district in Khyber Pakhtunkhwa Province, Pakistan
