= Amu Television =

Afghan multimedia company

Amu Television تلویزیون آمو
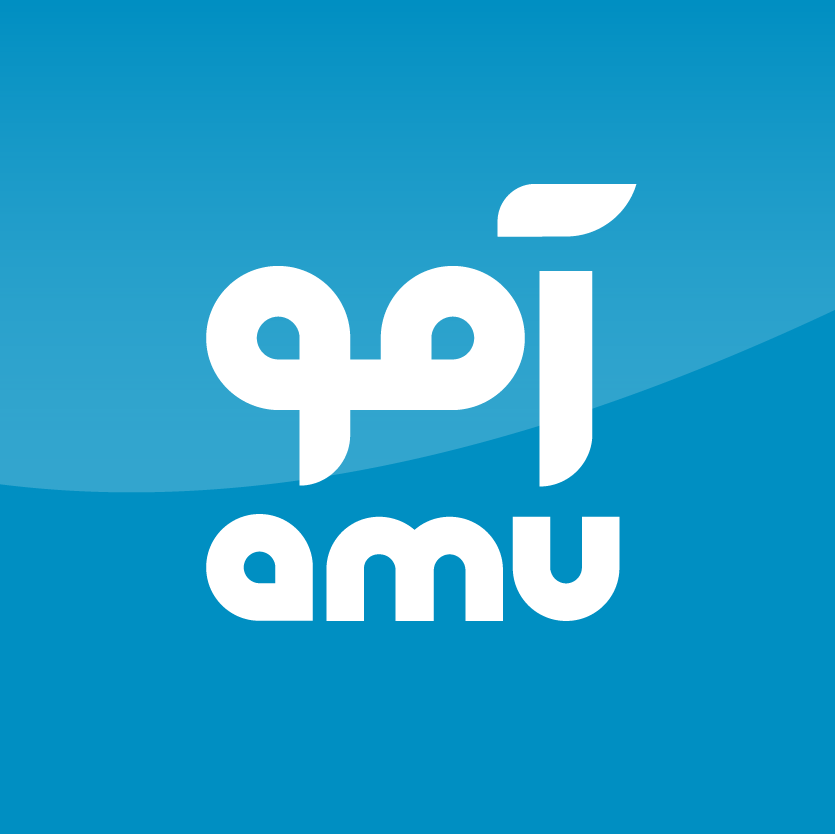
- Launch date: May 3, 2023
- Headquarters: Virginia, United States

Programming
- Language(s): Persian, Pashto
- Picture Format: HDTV
- Area served: Worldwide

Ownership
- Owner(s): Eye Media Group
- Key people: Lotfullah Najafizada, Sami Mahdi, Mujeeb Arez, Sharif Amiry, Karim Amini, Siyar Sirat, Hasiba Atakpal

Services
- Services: Television, Online
- Products: Broadcasting, Web Portals
- Website: https://amu.tv

Amu TV is an independent satellite television channel owned and operated by Eye Media Group. Providing content in Persian and Pashto, the channel was launched on May 3, 2023 to broadcast news and entertainment programs for Afghan society, promote press freedom, and support the rights of women and journalists despite the Taliban's restrictions on the media in Afghanistan. Amu TV channel's satellite broadcast reaches 19 million Afghans inside the country, and its digital platforms engage millions more worldwide.

Amu TV operates accounts on platforms like YouTube, Facebook, Instagram, X, and TikTok. Amu TV has expanded significantly since its launch, producing thousands of stories and videos across multiple languages and reaching millions of users globally.

== History ==
Following the Taliban's takeover of Afghanistan in August 2021, the country's media outlets faced censorship, persecution, and closure. Eye Media Group launched Amu TV to continue providing independent news and entertainment to the Afghan population within the country and abroad.

Amu TV was founded by journalists such as Lotfullah Najafizada and Sami Mahdi to address the need for diverse media content amidst severe media restrictions in Afghanistan. The name reflects the Amu Darya River, representing connection and resilience. While headquartered in Virginia, the network collaborates with contributors in Afghanistan, Europe, and North America.

== Content and programming ==
Amu TV broadcasts a variety of content, including news, current affairs, entertainment shows, drama, and music programs. The channel produces six hours of original content daily, which includes daily news programs in Persian and Pashto that cover domestic, economic, world, and sports news, current affairs programs like Mawj and Didban Kabul that offer analysis and interviews on significant issues, weekly entertainment programs such as Gul Shanbe, Yad Yaar Mehraban, Jan-e Gap, and Eso-Pas-Amoso which feature social media reviews and celebrity interviews, and Turkish drama shows dubbed in Persian and Pashto that provide cultural and entertainment content. The network also airs daily music programs despite the Taliban's restrictions on music.

Category	Program	Schedule	
Entertainment	Gulshanba (گلشنبه)	Fridays	9:00 PM
Entertainment	Eso Pas Amoso (ایسو! پس هموسو!)	Saturdays	8:30 PM
Entertainment	Jane Gap (جان گپ)	Saturdays, Sundays, Mondays	8:00 PM
Entertainment	Cartoon: Shaun the Sheep	Wednesday nights	7:00 PM
Entertainment	Turkish drama	Daily	2:00 PM & 7:00 PM
Politics	Mawj (موج)	Monday to Thursday	10:00 PM
Politics	Did Bane Kabul (دیدبان کابل)	Monday, Tuesday	9:00 PM
Politics	Farsi News	Daily	8:00 PM
Politics	Pashto News	Daily	10:00 PM
Politics	Tomorrow's Hope (امید فردا)	Monthly	7:00 PM

== Reception ==
In a detailed profile of Amu TV by The Atlantic, Amu TV was described as "one of the most effective chroniclers of life under Taliban rule" due to its hybrid modus operandi.

In 2023, Amu TV received the Democracy Award from the National Endowment for Democracy (NED) on behalf of independent Afghan media for its efforts in promoting press freedom in Afghanistan.
