= Bihsud District =

Bihsud District بهسود
- District
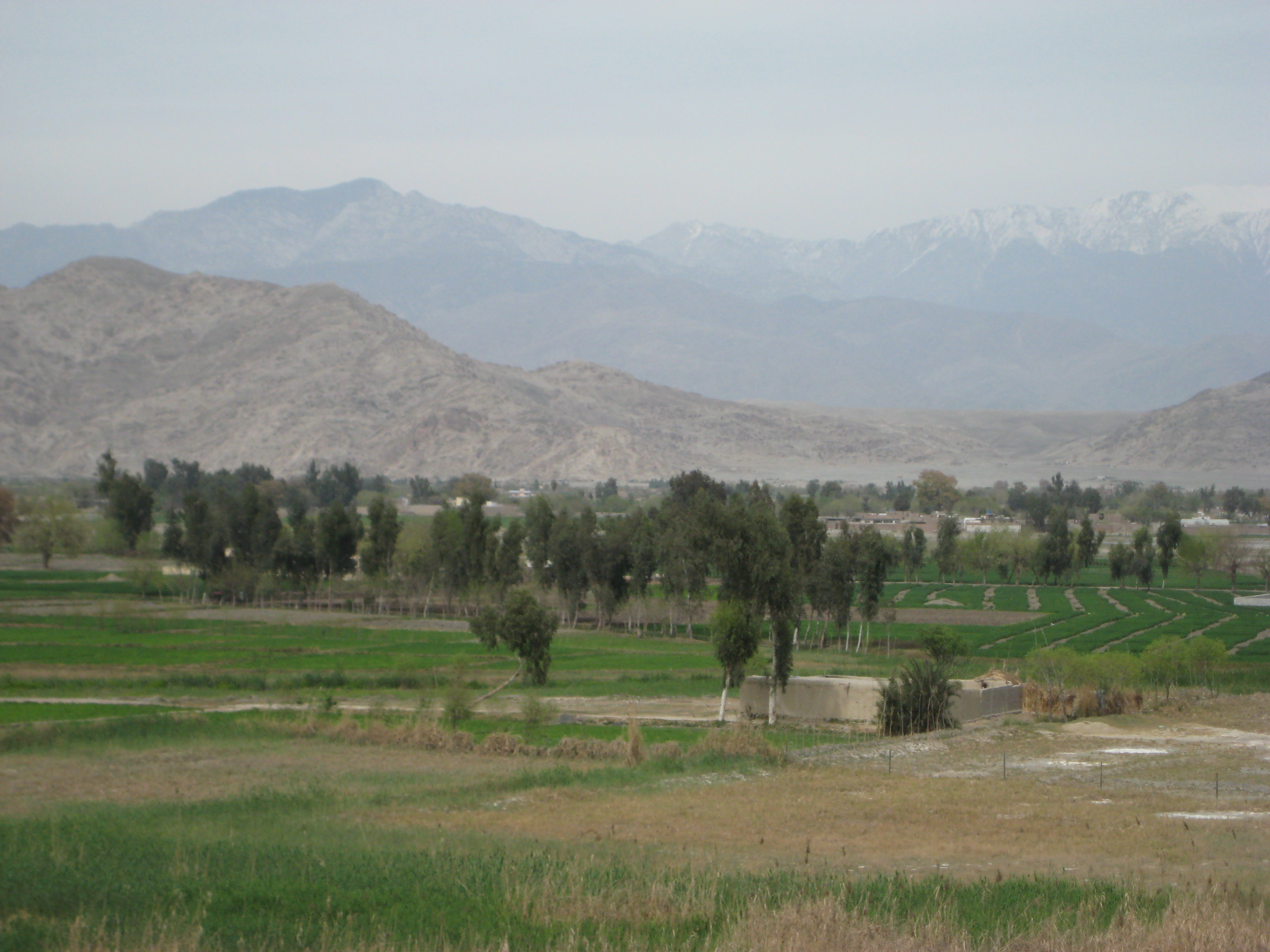
- Rural Bihsud District, looking north from the outskirts of Jalalabad

- Bishsud District is located in the north-west of Nangarhar Province.
- Country: Afghanistan
- Province: Nangarhar Province

Population (2019)
  - Total: 126,262
- Time zone: UTC+4:30 (D† (Afghanistan Standard Time))

Bihsud District (Pashto: بهسود) (formerly Jalalabad District) is a district of Nangarhar Province, Afghanistan. The district, which contains 40 main villages, is located around the city Jalalabad, spanning both sides of the Kabul River. The district was previously a unit which contained the city of Jalalabad, but in 2004 the city became independently administered under the municipality system, and the portions of the district not contained within the city became Bihsud District. Oranges, rice, and sugarcane grow in the fertile district, and the capital city has cane-processing and sugar-refining as well as papermaking industries. The district's year-round summery weather attracts many visitors.

== History ==
=== Greco-Buddhist era ===
In the past Jalalabad was the major city of the ancient Greco-Buddhist center of Gandhara. The Buddhist pilgrim Faxian visited the district around the year 400AD, and his travelogue described the many Buddhist sanctuaries in the area. The archaeological site of the city of Hadda is located in the district, and was a Buddhist center from the time of Kanishka, with statues of the Buddha as high as sixty-six feet.

Prior to the Islamic conquest, the Buddhist Kingdom of Kapisi stretched from Bamiyan to Jalalabad District.

== Communications ==
In September 2003, Internews established a Radio Sharq independent station in Jalalabad District.

August 1, 2007 marked the grand opening of the new District Communications Center (DCC). The construction of the DCC had started more than nine months before by Combined Forces Command-Afghanistan, but was handed over to the Nangarhar Provincial Reconstruction Team (PRT) to oversee completion. The new building was eventually signed over from the Nangarhar PRT to Amirzi Sengi, Minister of Communications.

== Governance ==
In an Afghanistan Research and Evaluation Unit survey conducted on 11 February 2008, respondents in Behsud district noted that problems in the community had previously been solved by gatherings of elders in a jirga which would meet when necessary. The relationship between this pattern of dispute resolution and the Community Development Council (CDC) role was not entirely clear, but seemed to involve consultation between both types of institution in the case of small problems, such as youth opium addiction, and perhaps less in more important cases. On the other hand, this community mentioned the role of maliks and uluswal as well, noting these institutions had played roles in dispute resolution, but usually in a negative way through their favouritism or likelihood to be corrupt. Moreover, the unpopularity of the malik and the uluswal could have resulted in a heightened awareness of responsibility for community issues.

== Demographics ==
As of 2002, the ethnic makeup of the district was approximately 95% Pashtun, 3% Arabs of Afghanistan and 2% Pashai. There were also 135 Hindu and Sikh families. The Khogiani tribe is centered in the area around Jalalabad.

Records from 1885 indicate the presence of Afghan Arabs (almost entirely Pashto speaking, who were described as pastoralists and agriculturalists.

In 2019, a population survey conducted by National Statistics and Information Authority estimated that total population of the district is 126,262, including 62,117 women and 64,145 men. All of them were living in rural area.

== Health ==
Jalalabad district has three hospitals: Fatumatu Zahra, Medical Hospital of Nangarhar, and the General Hospital of Public Health. The General Hospital of Public Health is one of the largest in the country.

As of July 24, 2004, polio (NSL3) has been identified and reported in the Jalalabad district area. This specific case has been linked to others reported in the past due to the highly transient and mobile population.

== Infrastructure ==
As of early 2009, Alternative Development Program - Eastern Region (ADP/E) and USAID's LGCD project have begun collaborating to build a park near the Behsud Bridge in Nangarhar, called Abdul Haq Park. ADP/E is conducting a topographical survey, and LGCD will provide funds to build the park. Together, they are working with local authorities and communities to plan the space according to the needs of the community.

== Commerce ==
The Nangarhar Handicraft Producers Association is located at Samarkhil Village of Behsud District. Formal vocational training was conducted in the reporting period. The project is jointly supported by ADP/E and the World Food Programme (WFP). Equipment and necessary raw materials are provided by ADP/E and food supply is facilitated by WFP. The training is aimed to target 120 trainees by eight trainers in eight classes of embroidery. Main activities to be covered in the first month are napkins which are further composed of different kinds of embroideries like Zanjiradozi, Pukhtadozi, Khandaridozi, and Khanjaradozi.

== Energy ==
Nangarhar has abundant water sources, and electricity in the Jalalabad area is provided by the Darunta Dam, built by the Soviet Union in 1957.

== Agriculture ==
An MAIL study on milk production and processing in June 2007 found Jalalabad district to be a recommended area for dairy development. The report stated a new dairy plant could be established near the city and collected in surrounding areas, serving the local market and selling dairy products in either Kabul or Pakistan.

=== Opium ===
In 2003, UNODC declared Jalalabad District "virtually poppy-free", with a reduction from 90 hectares in 2002 to 4 in 2003.

== Human rights ==
In the period 2003–2005, Human Rights Watch expressed concerns over gender-based violence in the area of Jalalabad, particularly in terms of threats to young women which prevented them from attending school. Due to the threat of abduction, sometimes by men associated with and protected by local powerbrokers, many young women had ceased to attend school in Jalalabad and the surrounding towns, suburbs and villages.

== Natural Disasters ==
=== 2006 flood ===
Flash floods caused by torrential rains struck Behsud district in the Nangarhar province (Jalalabad region) of eastern Afghanistan on 10 November 2006. An estimated 156 families were affected in Qasim Abad village (Behsud district), located 20 kilometres north of Jalalabad city. Five people were killed and nine injured in the village, while 50 houses were partially or totally destroyed.

== Arts and culture ==
Jalalabad District is home to various works of ancient Hindu art, though the 1908 Imperial Gazetteer of India notes that many depictions had been vandalized. Inscriptions in Aramaic have also been found in the district, indicating the presence of Jewish tribes in the area.
