= List of terrorist incidents in 2026 =

This is an ongoing/incomplete list of terrorist incidents which took place in 2026, including attacks by violent non-state actors for political motives. Note that terrorism related to drug wars and cartel violence is not included in these lists. Ongoing military conflicts are listed separately.

== Guidelines ==
- To be included, entries must be notable (have a stand-alone article) and described by a consensus of reliable sources as "terrorism".
- List entries must comply with the guidelines outlined in the manual of style under MOS:TERRORIST.
- Casualty figures in this list are the total casualties of the incident including immediate casualties and later casualties (such as people who succumbed to their wounds long after the attacks occurred).
- Casualties listed are the victims. Perpetrator casualties are listed separately (e.g. x (+y) indicate that x victims and y perpetrators were killed/injured).
- Casualty totals may be underestimated or unavailable due to a lack of information. A figure with a plus (+) sign indicates that at least that many people have died (e.g. 10+ indicates that at least 10 people have died) – the actual toll could be considerably higher. A figure with a plus (+) sign may also indicate that over that number of people are victims.
- If casualty figures are 20 or more, they will be shown in **bold**. In addition, figures for casualties more than 50 will also be **underlined**.
- Incidents are limited to one per location per day. If multiple attacks occur in the same place on the same day, they will be merged into a single incident.
- In addition to the guidelines above, the table also includes the following categories by the number of victims (people killed/injured by the attack):

0
1–19
20–49
50–99
100+

== List ==
Total incidents: 39

| Date | Type | Dead | Injured | Location | Article | Details | Perpetrator(s) | Part of |
|---|---|---|---|---|---|---|---|---|
| 19 January | Suicide bombing | 7 (+1) | 13+ | Kabul, Afghanistan | 2026 Kabul restaurant bombing | A suicide bombing on a Chinese restaurant called "Chinese Lanzhou Beef Noodles" occurred around 15:00 (AFT). The attack was perpetrated by IS-K. | Islamic State – Khorasan Province | Islamic State–Taliban conflict |
| 29 January – 5 February | Mass shooting, suicide bombing | 58 (+216) | Unknown | Balochistan, Pakistan | Jan–Feb 2026 Balochistan attacks | Militants of the separatist Balochistan Liberation Army launched a coordinated attack in multiple districts in Balochistan. | Balochistan Liberation Army | Insurgency in Balochistan |
| 3–4 February 2026 | Mass shooting | 200+ | 50+ | Nuku and Woro, Kwara State, Nigeria | 2026 Kwara State attacks | Hundreds of extremist militants attacked two villages after the villagers rejected the militants' demand to adopt their version of Sharia law. The militants torched a number of buildings and kidnapped several people. | (Islamic State) Boko Haram or (Islamic State) Lakurawa | Boko Haram insurgency |
| 6 February | Mass shooting, suicide bombing | 31 (+1) | 170 | Khadija Tul Kubra Mosque, Tarlai Kalan, Islamabad, Pakistan | 2026 Islamabad mosque bombing | A suicide bomber entered the Khadija Tul Kubra Mosque and detonated explosives around 13:30 (PKT) | Islamic State – Pakistan Province | Suicide bombings in Pakistan |
| 7 February | Mass stabbing | 0 | 6 (+1) | Ufa, Bashkortostan, Russia | Bashkir State Medical University attack | A mass stabbing occurred at a student residence of Bashkir State Medical University in Ufa. Media reported the attacker was a supporter of the National Socialism / White Power Neo-Nazi extremist group, designated as a terrorist organization by Russia. | Alexander S | Terrorism in Russia |
| 16 February | Car bombing, small arms attack | 12 (+12) | 7 | Bajaur District, Pakistan | 2026 Bajaur attack | A car bomb was detonated in front of a checkpoint at a military outpost. A group of militants then tried to enter the outpost, triggering a shootout with security forces. | Pakistani Taliban | Terrorism in Pakistan |
| 22 February | Bombing | 1 | 14 | Lviv, Ukraine | 2026 Lviv terror attacks | A police officer was killed and 14 others were injured after two explosions occurred in the western Ukrainian city of Lviv. | Unnamed Ukrainian woman, suspected to have ties with Russia | Terrorism in Ukraine |
| 25 February | Shooting | 0 (+5) | 1 (+5) | Off the coast of Cuba | 2026 Cuban boat incident | Cuba accused the ten suspects of planning "an infiltration with terrorist aims". | 10 armed suspects on a US-registered boat | 2026 Cuban Crisis |
| 1 March | Shooting | 3 (+1) | 15 | Austin, Texas, U.S. | 2026 Austin bar shooting | A man opened fire on people in a bar in Austin Texas. The motive is being investigated as terrorism. | Ndiaga Diagne | Terrorism in the United States |
| 7 March | Bombing | 0 | 0 | New York City, U.S. | 2026 New York City bombing attempt | A man threw a homemade bomb in New York City. | Islamic State | Terrorism in the United States |
| 12 March | Vehicle ramming attack, shootout | 0 (+1) | 64 | West Bloomfield Township, Michigan, U.S. | Temple Israel synagogue attack | A man rammed a truck into a synagogue, injuring 31 died in a shootout by police | Ayman Mohamed Ghazali | Terrorism in the United States |
| 12 March | School shooting, terrorism | 1 (+1) | 2 | Norfolk, Virginia, U.S. | 2026 Old Dominion University shooting | A man opened fire in an ROTC class at Dominion University killing 1 and wounding 2 other. The suspect was killed by students at the school. | Mohamed Bailor Jalloh | Terrorism in the United States |
| 16 March | Suicide bombings | 27+ | 146 | Maiduguri, Borno State, Nigeria | 2026 Maiduguri bombings | Three suspected suicide bombings were carried out at three locations in Maiduguri, Borno State, Nigeria. The bombings occurred during a yearslong peaceful stretch in the city. | (Islamic State) Boko Haram (suspected) | |
| 7 April | Shooting | 0 (+1) | 2 (+2) | Istanbul, Turkey | 2026 attack on Israeli consulate in Istanbul | Several perpetrators opened fire near the Israeli consulate building, Turkish police neutralized the attackers. | Islamic State – Turkey Province (suspected) | Terrorism in Turkey |
| 13 April | Suicide bombings | 0 (+2) | 1+ | Blida, Algeria | 2026 Blida attacks | Two attackers detonated their explosive belts near Blida's police station and near a sports complex. | Suspected islamic extremists | Jihadist insurgency in Algeria |
| 18 April | Mass shooting | 7 (+1) | 13 | Demiivka, Kyiv, Ukraine | 2026 Kyiv Shooting | A man opened fire in a supermarket and took hostages before being killed by police. The Security Service of Ukraine said that it was investigating the attack as an act of terrorism. | Dmytro Vasylchenkov | Terrorism in Ukraine |
| 25 April | Car bombing | 20 | 36 | Cajibío, Cauca, Colombia | 2026 Cauca bombing | A car bomb was detonating near the Pan-American Highway destroying multiple vehicles including a bus.<ref">"Atentado com explosivos deixa 20 mortos na Colômbia" [Bombing leaves 20 dead in Colombia]. BBC (in Portuguese).</ref> | FARC dissidents | Colombian conflict |
| 29 April | Mass stabbing | 0 | 3 | Golders Green, London, England | 2026 Golders Green attack | An individual with known history of violence and mental issues stabbed and injured a Muslim and two Jewish men in a series of attacks. The Metropolitan Police declared the incident an act of terrorism. | Harakat Ashab al-Yamin al-Islamia (claimed responsibility) | 2026 London antisemitic attacks |
| 9 May | Suicide Bombing, Shootout | 21 | 5 | Bannu, Khyber Pakhtunkhwa, Pakistan | 2026 Bannu attacks | At 8:55 p.m. local time, a suicide bomber and multiple fighters detonated an explosives-laden vehicle near a security post, causing the post to collapse, destroying nearby vehicles and severely damaging nearby civilian areas. | Ittihad-ul-Mujahideen Pakistan | Insurgency in Khyber Pakhtunkhwa |
| 16 May | Vehicle-ramming attack, Shootout | 1 | 7 | Modena, Emilia Romagna, Italy | 2026 Modena car-ramming attack | A driver ran his car over multiple pedestrians in Modena, Italy and stabbed another while escaping. One person later died of injuries. | Salim El Koudri | Terrorism in Italy |
| 18 May | Mass shooting | 3 (+2) | 1 | San Diego, United States | 2026 Islamic Center of San Diego shooting | Two neo-Nazi teenagers livestreamed themselves opening fire at the Islamic Center of San Diego, killing 3. They also injured a landscaper in a drive-by shooting, though the person was not struck by gunfire. One gunman fatally shot the other gunman who asked to be shot, before taking his own life. | Cain Lee Clark, Caleb Liam Vazquez | Terrorism in the United States |
| 24 May | Suicide Bombing | 47+ | 98+ | Quetta, Balochistan, Pakistan | 2026 Quetta train bombing | Shortly after 8:00 a.m. PKT, an explosives-laden vehicle struck one of the carriages of a shuttle train near Chaman Phatak as the train was travelling through Quetta. | Balochistan Liberation Army | Insurgency in Balochistan |
| 28 May | Mass stabbing | 0 | 3 | Winterthur, Switzerland | 2026 Winterthur stabbing attack | An individual with a known history of mental issues and support of Islamic State stabbed and injured three people at the Winterthur railway station while shouting Allahu Akbar. The Zurich canton police described the incident as an act of terrorism. | Nesip deleper | Islamic terrorism in Europe |
| 18 June | Suicide bombing, mass shooting | 13 (+22) | 4 | Niamey, Niger | June 2026 Diori Hamani International Airport attack | A group of terrorist attacked the airport committing shootings and detonating their explosive belts. Soldiers and armed civilians countered the attack. | Jama'at Nusrat al-Islam wal-Muslimin | Islamist insurgency in Niger |
| 19 June | Mass stabbing | 0 | 5 | Edinburgh, United Kingdom | 2026 Edinburgh attacks | A man carried out a stabbing spree targeting Muslim people on the streets of Edinburgh, Scotland, wounding five people. The perpetrator shouted xenophobic and Islamophobic slurs at the time of the arrest. He was detained for terrorist-related offences. | Lewis Hawkes | Islamophobia in the United Kingdom |
| 1 July | Firebombings | 1 | 4 | Thessaloniki, Greece | 2026 Thessaloniki firebombs | Firebombing attacks were carried out against homes of mebers of the New Democracy party. Two suspects were arrested for the attacks. | Two unidentified people | Terrorism in Greece |
| 4 July – 8 July | Mass shooting, ambush | 129 (+182) | 6 | Balochistan, Pakistan | July 2026 Balochistan attacks | Militants of the separatist Balochistan Liberation Army launched a coordinated attack in multiple districts in Balochistan. The Pakistani army later launches a military operation against the terrorists. | Balochistan Liberation Army | Insurgency in Balochistan |
| 22 July | Mass shooting, bombing | 5 | 6 | Narathiwat, Thailand | 2026 Narathiwat attack | Militants attacked paramilitary personnel by shooting at them and throwing pipe bombs. | Unidentified militants | Southern Thailand insurgency |
| 25 July | Vehicle ramming attack | 1 (+1) | 29 | Berlin, Germany | 2026 Berlin Pride van attack | Abdul Ballout rammed his car in to a pride parade in Berlin Germany, killing one wounding 29 others. The attack is to be motivated by homophobia. The suspect later died by rushing the police with a knife, believed to be suicide by cop | Abdul Ballout | Terrorism in Germany |
| 1 August | Suicide bombing | 4 (+1) | 19 | Moscow, Russia | 2026 Moscow restaurant bombing | An improvised explosive device was detonated by a woman inside the Balzi Rossi restaurant in Moscow, while a private banquet, which was being attended by military official, was taking place. The attack was reportedly an assassination attempt against Aleksandr Chayko, who survived the bombing. | Unidentified woman, Security Service of Ukraine (alleged by Russia) | Terrorism in Russia |
| 10 September | Assault | 105-155+ | Unknown | Dioura, Mali | 2026 Dioura attack | Jihadists attacked and captured a military base hosting malian and russian soldiers. | Jama'at Nusrat al-Islam wal-Muslimin | 2026 Mali offensives |
| 18 September | Car bombing, Suicide bombing, Mass shooting | 23 (+8) | 103 | Kohat, Pakistan | 2026 Kohat attack | At about 13:15 PKT, a suicide bomber rammed and detonated a car bomb into the entrance of the Old Lines Police Complex Mosque in Kohat, Pakistan. Six gunmen and a suicide bomber then proceeded to enter the complex and engaged in a 22-hour long gun battle with Pakistani security forces within the complex. A total of 31 people, including the eight attackers, died and 103 were injured. Fighting between Pakistan and Afghanistan renewed because of the attack. | Ittihad-ul-Mujahideen Pakistan | Insurgency in Khyber Pakhtunkhwa, 2026 Afghanistan–Pakistan war |
| 20 September | Mass shooting, ambush | 0 (+1) | 1 | Belleville, Ontario, Canada | 2026 Belleville synagogue shooting | A man opened fire against a synagogue injuring a police officer. The attacker was later killed by cops. | Sean Ward | Far-right Terrorism in Canada |
| 30 September | Attempted aircraft hijacking, Attempted mass murder-suicide by pilot | 0 | 6+ | Over Saudi Arabia | Flydubai Flight 1073 | The aircraft was flying over the skies of Saudi Arabia on a Dubai-Tel Aviv flight when the first officer, who was banned from flying for Oman Air, his previous employer, due to his religious fanaticism, attacked the captain with an axe and deliberately damaged the aircraft in an attempt to cause a crash and kill everyone onboard, a struggle ensued involving the pilots and several passengers who came to the captain's aid, resulting in multiple injuries. The first officer was subsequently removed from the cockpit and both pilots were given first aid. A set of relief crew then took over the controls, safely landing the damaged aircraft in Saudi Arabia. This attack is believed to be motivated by Islamic extremism. | Hammam al-Hammami, the first officer of the flight | |
| 13 October | School shooting | 0 | 3 | Aubagne, France | 2026 Aubagne school shooting | A 14-year-old middle school student opened fire with a hunting rifle at a school in Aubagne, France wounding two people. The shooting is being investigated as an act of terrorism involving the True Crime Community. | 14-year-old student | Terrorism in France, crimes involving the True Crime Community |
| 19 October | Attempted Mass stabbing | 0 | 2 (+1) | Bistrița, Romania | 2026 Bistrița school stabbing | A 13-year-old student stabbed a teacher and a fellow student. After the incident was investigated, his TikTok profile was found to contain content related to the Great Replacement Theory. He had also been inspired by Timofey Kulyamov and Brenton Tarrant. | Andi | Terrorism in Romania |
| 23 October | Mass shooting, | 9 | 40 | Hammoud, Karak governorate, Jordan | 2026 Karak church shooting | Two gunmen committed a mass shooting against a Christian Orthodox Church in Hammoud, Karak governorate, Jordan. The attack occurred during a funeral. The two attackers fled the scene. | Islamic State (suspected) | Terrorism in Jordan |
| 23 October | Mass shooting | 1 | 7 | Trappes and La Verrière, France | 2026 Trappes and La Verrière shootings | A gunmen drove his car across Trappes and La Verrière, France, committing multiple shootings. The attacker targeted immigrants at a petrol station, a medical centre and a playground. | Unidentified individual | Terrorism in France, Far right terrorism in Europe |
| 7 November | Mass shooting | 9 (+1) | 15 | Kraków, Poland | 2026 Kraków shooting | A gunman shot and killed three of his family members inside his home, then drove his car through the Main Market Square of Krakow, where he shot bystanders. The attacker was stopped and wounded by the police, and later declared dead at the hospital. Polish authorities called the shooting an act of terrorism. | Michał O. | Terrorism in Poland |
