= 2026 Kohat attack =

Attack on a police complex in Kohat, Pakistan

- Part of the insurgency in Khyber Pakhtunkhwa and the 2026 Afghanistan–Pakistan war
- CCTV still frame of the car bomb exploding outside the mosque
- Location: 33°35′22″N 71°25′52″E; Kohat, Khyber Pakhtunkhwa, Pakistan
- Date: 18–19 September 2026; 13:15 (PKT; UTC+5)
- Target: Old Police Lines complex
- Attack type: Car bombing; Suicide bombings; Shootout
- Deaths: 31 (including 8 attackers)
- Injuries: 103 (4 critical)
- Perpetrator: Ittihad-ul-Mujahideen Pakistan
- No. of participants: 8
- Defenders: Kohat Police; Elite Force; Counter Terrorism Department; Pakistan Army

On 18 September 2026, armed insurgents attacked and occupied the Old Police Lines complex in Kohat, Pakistan. After an initial attack on the Old Police Lines mosque, a battle and clearance operation continued for about 22 hours, resulting in 31 deaths and 103 injuries.

It is the second attack on the Old Police Lines complex; it had previously been targeted in a suicide car bombing on 7 September 2010 that resulted in 20 deaths and over 90 injuries. It is the deadliest attack against a police complex in Khyber Pakhtunkhwa since the 2023 bombing of the Peshawar Police Lines mosque.

After the attack, Pakistan significantly strengthened counterterrorism operations along the Afghan border, alleging that the perpetrators had originated from Afghanistan. Pakistan launched air strikes in retaliation for the attack, breaking a three-month lull in the 2026 Afghanistan‍–‍Pakistan war. Hostilities quickly grew, with skirmishes, air strikes, artillery fire, and drone attacks being exchanged after supposed incursions.

== Attack ==
People outside the mosque reacting to the car bomb explosion

On the afternoon of 18 September, police officers and civilians were attending Friday prayers at the mosque of the Kohat Old Police Lines, whose Counter Terrorism Department (CTD) had participated in counterterrorism operations in Khyber Pakhtunkhwa. At around 13:15 PKT (UTC+5:00), a suicide bomber rammed an explosives-laden car through the gate of the police complex and into the entrance of the mosque before it exploded. Gunfire broke out when seven heavily armed militants with hand grenades, sniper rifles, and other weaponry launched an assault on the complex, taking up positions in the complex's Special Branch building. During the engagement with security personnel, a suicide bomber detonated himself near the Special Branch building. Six of the eight attackers were dead within the first few hours of the battle.

Militants also targeted a police post at the main gate of Kohat's district courts, damaging it but causing no casualties. All offices and district courts near the Old Police Lines were then closed as authorities declared an emergency and implemented additional security measures.

On the morning of 19 September, the Pakistan Army joined. A joint operation was initiated to clear the two remaining militants who had hidden themselves within the complex, utilising drone technology to monitor their movements.

The militants were eventually defeated by the Kohat Police, Elite Force, CTD, and Pakistan Army after about 22 hours of fighting. All of the attackers, including suicide bombers and a sniper, died.

The police complex suffered extensive damage. The car bomb blew a crater outside the mosque, trapped people in rubble, and caused offices to collapse. Damage was done to nearby structures, including government and private property. Rescue 1122 provided relief efforts at the site with more than 60 personnel and 24 emergency vehicles, some from neighbouring districts.

== Casualties ==
Thirty-one people died in the attack, identified as fifteen government personnel, six civilians, eight attackers, and two government personnel who later died of injuries. Seventy-three government personnel and thirty civilians were injured, four of whom were in critical condition and required laparotomies. Ninety of those wounded were received at DHQ Hospital Kohat while the other thirteen were sent to Liaqat Memorial Hospital. Funeral prayers were held for the killed officers later in the day while the remains of the civilians were released to their families for burial.

== Investigation ==
Pakistani president Asif Ali Zardari initially implicated the Pakistani Taliban, who denied carrying out the attack. Ittihad-ul-Mujahideen Pakistan, an alliance of Pakistani Taliban offshoots led by Hafiz Gul Bahadur, claimed responsibility for the attack.

An investigation was conducted to determine the planning, supplies, training, and potential links to other actors involved in the attack. On 20 September, a first information report was registered by Kohat Police with the CTD against "unidentified terrorists", charging them with terrorism, murder, and attempted murder, among other offences. Investigators believed the attackers planned for a prolonged siege at the complex for several hours.

The Kohat Police, CTD, and Elite Force jointly investigated the identities of the attackers and potential links to foreign actors. Pakistani authorities claimed to have identified one of the attackers as an Afghan national named Mutiullah, which prompted further scrutiny regarding the perpetrators' alleged links to Afghanistan.

On 16 October, the CTD announced the death of several Hafiz Gul Bahadur group militants in a raid in Lakki Marwat including commander Zahid Gul, labelled the mastermind of the attack. Gul reportedly organised the arrival of the suicide bombers in Kohat and guided the vehicle used in the bombing to the Old Police Lines complex. He was also wanted for several other militant incidents, and had organised a suicide attack in Kohat two months prior which was foiled by security services.

== Reactions ==
=== Pakistan ===
Asif Ali Zardari expressed "regret" over the attack, giving "his best wishes for the swift recovery of those injured in the explosion" in a statement, and called for the "complete elimination" of foreign-backed terrorists. Prime Minister Shehbaz Sharif condemned the attack and gave condolences to the victims. He directed authorities to accelerate rescue operations. The Ministry of Interior said that the "cowardly actions" of the attackers would not weaken "the nation's resolve." Chief Minister of Khyber Pakhtunkhwa Sohail Afridi visited those affected by the attack and paid tribute to responders.

=== International ===
United Nations spokesperson Stéphane Dujarric stated that Secretary-General António Guterres strongly condemned the terrorist attack targeting the mosque and police complex in Kohat, saying "attacks targeting civilians and places of worship are unacceptable". UN Under-Secretary-General Miguel Ángel Moratinos also offered condolences and condemned the Kohat attack, saying "Places of worship must remain protected spaces where people feel safe." United Nations Security Council president Jérôme Bonnafont condemned the attack "in the strongest terms", describing it as "heinous and cowardly". Security Council members obliged all states to cooperate with Pakistan to bring the perpetrators to justice and for adherence to international law.

The attack drew condemnation from several Islamic terrorist groups, including the Pakistani Taliban, Jamaat-ul-Ahrar, and al-Qaeda in the Indian subcontinent.

The General Secretariat of the Organisation of Islamic Countries offered condolences and condemned the Kohat attack, as did Afghanistan, Australia, China, Iran, Jordan, Kuwait, Palestine, Poland, Qatar, Russia, Saudi Arabia, Turkey, and the United Kingdom. Pakistan rejected Afghanistan's statement, calling it a "pretence of dialogue", and demanded they act on dismantling "terrorist sanctuaries, alongside their recruitment and support infrastructure in Afghanistan" instead of "deflecting responsibility" onto Pakistan.

== Aftermath ==
On 19 September, Pakistan's Ministry of Information & Broadcasting (MoIB) accused Afghanistan of sponsoring terrorism in Pakistan, demanding its Taliban government take "credible, verifiable and sustained measures" to dismantle militant sanctuaries and terrorist recruitment and training networks on its soil, warning they have the "will and the capability to eliminate terrorist threats wherever they are".

Ahmed Sharif Chaudhry of the Pakistan Army declared that the Taliban's inaction constituted a violation of the Doha Accords, which requires that the Taliban prevent terrorist groups from being hosted in Afghan territory. Asserting Pakistan's "right to defend itself", he warned that Pakistan was "left with no other option" than to take any necessary steps to resolve the issue if the Taliban did not comply. Afghanistan denied the accusations, threatening "retaliatory action" and a "crushing response" if Pakistan violated Afghan sovereignty. Aziz Maraj, a former diplomat, suggested that Afghanistan should file a complaint to the International Court of Justice to protect "Afghanistan's dignity and reputation" against Pakistani defamation should Pakistan fail to provide evidence of the Afghan involvement.

Pakistan increased counterterrorism operations in provinces along its border with Afghanistan under its ongoing counterterrorism campaign, Operation Ghazab lil Haq. On 20 September, a Pakistani Security Forces convoy attacked a group of terrorists supposedly "belonging to Indian proxy Fitna Al Khwarij" in a "well-planned intelligence-based ground operation" in Kohat, Hangu, and Thal. Nine of the terrorists and six Pakistani personnel died in the exchange and a number were injured. More intelligence-based operations occurred in the region, with six terrorists killed and nine suspects "belonging to Fitna al-Hindustan" being arrested in Saran Tangi, Balochistan on 22 September, in a mission named Operation Shaban‑2.

On 21 September, Pakistani fighter jets launched overnight air strikes on Nurgal District and Barmal District in eastern Afghanistan, breaking a three-month period of reduced conflict. Afghan officials reported that strikes in Barmal destroyed a grocery store and an empty house in the Rakhah and Tor Kandi areas with no casualties, while strikes in Nurgal hit a family home, killing three and injuring four family members. The casualties were corroborated by the United Nations Assistance Mission in Afghanistan, who reported that "a man, woman and a girl were killed and four injured in apparent strikes". Pakistan denied attacking civilians, claiming the buildings were militant hideouts and that the strikes hit their targets with "[m]aximum precautions" against collateral damage; targets purportedly included a suicide bomber training centre and weapons depot, and 28 militants and multiple suicide bombers were killed according to the Pakistani MoIB. Afghanistan condemned the air strikes as acts of “aggression and criminality”, alleging the Pakistan Air Force carried them out as a distraction from Pakistan's security failures. The Afghan Ministry of Foreign Affairs summoned Pakistan’s chargé d’affaires in Kabul and handed him a formal protest over the violation of Afghan airspace and civilian attacks. More Pakistani air strikes on Afghanistan continued into October.

On 22 September, Pakistani officials reported that several Pakistani Taliban militants attempted to infiltrate the border at Kurram from Nangarhar and Paktia in Afghanistan. After being identified by Pakistani troops, the militants and Afghan Army reportedly began firing mortars and heavy weapons on Pakistani checkposts unprovoked. In retaliation, Pakistani troops launched multiple artillery strikes on Afghan checkposts and defensive positions, reportedly causing several to flee their posts as a result. Afghanistan denied that such an attack occurred.

On 23 September, eight rudimentary attack drones were launched from Afghanistan and entered Pakistani airspace but then were shot down over Torkham and Kohat by Pakistani air defences and armed forces. In retaliation, Pakistan carried out ten "deliberate, precise, calibrated, and proportionate" air strikes and drone attacks on Afghan military sites in Kandahar, Paktia, and Khost early on 24 September, claiming they were used to store and launch drones. The air strikes killed at least four civilians according Afghan officials. Afghanistan denied launching the drones and called the strikes "indiscriminate and cowardly", warning of "dire consequences".

On 25 September, Pakistani officials reported that several Afghan Taliban members were killed while attempting to enter Gulistan, Balochistan. Intermittent exchange of fire between security forces and the Afghan Taliban continued after midnight, with thirteen Taliban personnel reportedly dying in the clash. Afghanistan's Ministry of Defence denied that its forces suffered any casualties. From 27 to 30 September, Afghanistan claimed that its forces killed 41 insurgents and captured 62 others in Nuristan allegedly belonging to ISIS and Pakistani militias. Pakistan’s MoIB dismissed the claim as a fabrication, describing it as “frivolous, baseless and devoid of any truth”.

== See also ==
- 2026 Bannu attacks
- April 2010 Kohat bombings
