= 2022 Bannu counterterrorism centre attack and siege =

Islamist attack and special forces counter-siege in Khyber Pakhtunkhwa

2022 Siege of CTD Bannu centre
- Part of the Insurgency in Khyber Pakhtunkhwa
Date	18 – 20 December 2022
Location	Bannu Cantonment, Bannu District, Khyber-Pakhtunkhwa Province, Pakistan 32°59′52.5″N 70°36′00.2″E
Result	Pakistani victory: Pakistan regains control of Bannu CTD centre

Belligerents
Pakistan Army; Frontier Corps	Tehrik-i-Taliban Pakistan

Units involved
Special Service Group	Unknown

Strength
Unknown	35

Casualties and losses
3 killed 15 wounded	25 killed
- Location of Bannu Cantonment in Khyber Pakhtunkhwa Location of Bannu Cantt in Pakistan

On 18 December 2022, the Pakistani Taliban carried out an attack on a counterterrorism centre in the Bannu District, Khyber Pakhtunkhwa. They took the officers hostage until 20 December, when Pakistan's security forces lay siege to the centre, rescuing the hostages and killing 25 militants inside. Two officers were killed during the siege.

== Background ==
An Islamist insurgency began in 2004 in the Federally Administered Tribal Areas and North-West Frontier Province, which are now Khyber Pakhtunkhwa. Terrorist attacks in Bannu included bombings in 2014 and 2018.

== Initial attack ==
=== Escape and takeover ===
On 18 December 2022, terrorists incarcerated at a Counter Terrorism Department facility in Bannu Cantt, Pakistan managed to escape their cells and held security personnel hostage for over 48 hours.

A policeman and a soldier were injured when the extremists "took over the premises," according to an official source. According to a provincial government spokesperson, the militants demanding the safe passage to Afghanistan via helicopter

They took all the staff at the centre hostage.

=== Perpetrators ===
The Pakistani Taliban claimed responsibility for the attack.

=== Reaction ===
During a press briefing US State Department Spokesperson Ned Price, while responding to a question regarding the Bannu situation offered 'assistance' to Pakistan and said the Government of Pakistan was a partner when it came to shared challenges, including the challenge of terrorist groups inside Afghanistan.

== Siege ==
=== Outcome ===
On 20 December at 12:30 pm, the Special Service Group launched an operation in which all the terrorists were killed and hostages were freed. The CTD compound was cleared by 2:30 p.m.

== See also ==
- 2014 Bannu bombing
- 2018 Mastung and Bannu bombings
