= Bakka =

Bakka may refer to:

== Places ==
=== Lebanon ===
- Bakka, Lebanon, a village, Roman temple and municipality in the Rashaya District, Lebanon

=== Norway ===
- Bakka, Aurland, a village in Aurland Municipality in Vestland county, Norway
  - Bakka Church in Aurland Municipality in Vestland county, Norway
- Bakka, Kvam, a village in Kvam Municipality in Vestland county, Norway
- Bakka, Kvinnherad, a farm area in Kvinnherad Municipality in Vestland county, Norway

=== Saudi Arabia ===
- Bakkah, also transliterated Bakka, is the ancient name for Mecca, Saudi Arabia

=== Pakistan ===
- Bakka, Haripur, a union council in Pakistan

== People ==
- Bakka Khel, a subtribe of the Utmanzai (Pashtun tribe)

== Other ==
- Bakka-Phoenix, a bookstore in Toronto, Canada
