= Bannu Cantonment attack =

15 July 2024 terror attack on Bannu Cantonment, Pakistan

Bannu Cantonment Attack
- CCTV of the explosion
Date	15 July 2024
Location	Bannu Cantonment, Khyber-Pakhtunkhwa, Pakistan
Result	Pakistani victory: Attack repelled; All attackers eliminated

Belligerents
Pakistan	Pakistani Taliban

Commanders and leaders
Unknown	Hafiz Gul Bahadur

Units involved
Pakistan Armed Forces	(al-Qaeda) Hafiz Gul Bahadur Group

Strength
Unknown	10 attackers

Casualties and losses
8 soldiers killed 141 injured (including at least 7 civilians)	10 attackers killed

On 15 July 2024, before dawn, the Bannu Cantonment in Khyber-Pakhtunkhwa, Pakistan, was targeted by ten militants from the Hafiz Gul Bahadur group of the Pakistani Taliban, based in Afghanistan. The militants attempted to breach the cantonment's defenses but were repelled by security forces. In retaliation, the militants detonated a vehicle filled with explosives against the cantonment's boundary wall, causing a section of it to collapse and inflicting damage on the nearby infrastructure. The attack resulted in the killing of eight soldiers and injuries to over 141 others including, seven civilians who were also injured in the crossfire. Security forces responded following the initial breach, killing all ten attackers.

== Casualties ==
The explosion caused a section of the wall to collapse and inflicted damage on the nearby infrastructure. Eight soldiers of the Pakistan Army and ten militants were killed in the attack.

== Counter-attack ==
The security forces swiftly responded to the attack, resulting in the neutralization of all ten militants. Military helicopters were dispatched to the region and ground troops were also deployed in the region. A military operation is being conducted in the area by Pakistan Army.

== Perpetrators ==
The attack was carried out by the Hafiz Gul Bahadur group, which is based in Afghanistan. This group has previously used Afghan territory to plan and execute terrorist activities inside Pakistan.

== Aftermath ==
Pakistan has repeatedly expressed its concerns to the Interim Afghan Government, urging them to prevent the misuse of Afghan territory by terrorists and to take effective action against such elements. The Pakistan Armed Forces have reaffirmed their commitment to protect the country from the threat of terrorism and are prepared to take all necessary steps to counter these threats originating from Afghanistan.

== March 2025 attack ==
On March 4, 2025, a terrorist attack struck the Bannu Cantonment. Four suicide bombers detonated explosives at the base's perimeter, allowing armed militants to enter and engage in a fierce gun battle with security forces. The attack resulted in at least 16 deaths, meanwhile 13 civilians lost their lives, while 30 others sustained injuries. The militant group Jaish Al-Fursan, affiliated with the Pakistani Taliban, claimed responsibility. The explosions also damaged nearby buildings, including a mosque, where civilians were caught in the collapse. Prime Minister Shehbaz Sharif and COAS Asim Munir strongly condemned the attack, pledging a firm response against terrorism.

== See also ==
- 2024 in Pakistan
- Terrorist incidents in Pakistan in 2024
- 2025 in Pakistan
- Terrorist incidents in Pakistan in 2025
- 2025 Mir Ali attack, another attack by the same group
