= Ittihad-ul-Mujahideen Pakistan =

Pakistani Islamist militant organisation

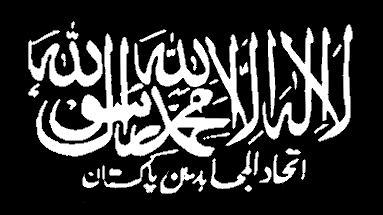
- One of the flags used by the group
- Founding leader: Hafiz Gul Bahadur
- Spokesperson: Mahmood ul-Hasan
- Founded: 11 April 2025
- Merger of: Hafiz Gul Bahadur Group; Lashkar-e-Islam; Harakat-e-Inqilab-e-Islami
- Country: Pakistan
- Headquarters: Kunar, Afghanistan
- Active regions: Khyber Pakhtunkhwa
- Ideology: Jihadism; Islamism; Pashtunwali
- Part of: al-Qaeda in the Indian Subcontinent (alleged)
- Wars: Insurgency in Khyber Pakhtunkhwa; 2026 Afghanistan–Pakistan war

Ittihad-ul-Mujahideen Pakistan (IMP; Urdu: اتحاد المجاہدین پاکستان, lit. 'United Warriors of Pakistan') is a Pakistani alliance of Islamist militant groups operating in the Khyber Pakhtunkhwa province. Groups that joined the alliance include; Hafiz Gul Bahadur Group, Lashkar-e-Islam and Harakat-e-Inqilab-e-Islami.

The formation of the alliance was announced on 11 April 2025, by media wings of all three groups. IMP described itself as an "unified front" for "elevating the word of Allah". The alliance said its factions are splinter groups of the Pakistani Taliban movement. The coalition was established under the leadership of Hafiz Gul Bahadur, head of a Pakistani Taliban faction.

== History ==
The founder of Ittihad-ul-Mujahideen Pakistan is Hafiz Gul Bahadur, who leads an eponymous militant group. During the war in Afghanistan, Gul Bahadur sheltered Taliban, Haqqani Network and al-Qaeda militants in North Waziristan, Pakistan. Gul Bahadur's group fought alongside the Taliban in Afghanistan while he amassed influence as a power broker among jihadists in northwest Pakistan. He maintained a truce with the Pakistani government until 2014, when a major Pakistani offensive forced his group to flee across the border. The group remained dormant until the Taliban regained control of Afghanistan in 2021, whereupon Bahadur began to reactivate his network from there. Leveraging his long-standing links to al-Qaeda from the war, he forged alliance and attracted militants from North Waziristan and neighbouring tribal districts. His group re-emerged in 2022 fighting against Pakistan.

Ittihad-ul-Mujahideen Pakistan was founded on 11 April 2025, its creation was announced by media wings of Hafiz Gul Bahadur Group, Lashkar-e-Islam and Harakat-e-Inqilab-e-Islami. IMP said it would support the oppressed and wage jihad against the Pakistani government as an "unified front" for "elevating the word of Allah". IMP created its media wing, naming it "Sada-e-Ghazwat-ul-Hind" and assigned Mahmood ul-Hasan to be IMP's spokesperson. IMP uses Twitter account "@Tarjuman_IMP" to make statements and threats, the account is operated by the spokesperson. IMP also has a Telegram channel which they use to distribute propaganda videos in Pashto, Urdu and English.

While the alliance did not officially reveal the name of its leader, Hafiz Gul Bahadur was widely regarded as instrumental in its formation among militant circles. Journalist Jawad Yousafzai speculated in April 2025 that Gul Bahadur will lead the group. "The Khorasan Diary" news outlet stated that the IMP alliance was established under the leadership of Hafiz Gul Bahadur, head of a Pakistani Taliban faction.

Between 12 April and 16, 2025, IMP claimed responsibility for armed attacks against Pakistani security forces in North Waziristan District and Tirah. The group conducted grenade attacks, rocket attacks as well as ambushes on convoys. IMP, together with Tehreek-e-Taliban Pakistan used anti-drone technology to counter aerial attacks from the government. Unlike the TTP, which preferred to keep its drone capabilities secret, IMP has publicly announced the use of explosive-laden quadcopters against government forces. The groups conducted a total of 405 attacks using quadcopters in 2025.

The Pakistani government has accused IMP of being a front for TTP, as well as Al-Qaeda. A report from the United Nations said that IMP, along with other militant groups, operate out of Afganistan.

In July 2025, a Lashkar-e-Islam source claimed that a Pakistani Taliban commander from South Waziristan, along with a group of militants led by an associate of the later-deceased former TTP Emir Hakimullah Mehsud joined IMP. That same month, IMP released a report on its military activities, claiming the group had carried out 89 attacks in July 2025 that killed 88 and injured 15 security personnel. It stated that its attacks are usually carried out by Hafiz Gul Bahadur Group and Lashkar-e-Islam.

In February 2026, Al-Qaeda in the Indian Subcontinent (AQIS) mentioned IMP in its infographic overviewing militant activity of Islamist groups. Analysts speculated that this suggests ideological or operational links between the two groups. A United Nations Security Council report released later in the year stated that AQIS provides training and strategic planning for IMP and forms "the backbone" of the alliance.

== Organization ==
Ittihad-ul-Mujahideen Pakistan operates as an umbrella organization in which each of its various sub-groups coordinate attacks, intelligence-sharing, media activity and propaganda output. Led by Gul Bahadur, the group has highlighted its unified chain of command. The Gul Bahadur group is considered the most powerful faction within the alliance—it operates four suicide bomber training camps. Manpower for attacks are primarily pooled from Gul Bahadur, while other factions provide it with auxiliary support. The alliance does not recruit foreign fighters or affiliate itself with transnational jihadist groups, likely to appease the Afghan Taliban.

S. Rajaratnam School of International Studies analyst Abdul Basit described the alliance as "an umbrella of different militant groups where al Qaeda is the architect and Gul Bahadur is the face".

=== Ideology and media ===
According to Jamestown Foundation, Ittihad-ul-Mujahideen Pakistan promotes anti-western, jihadist, and nationalist rhetoric. A propaganda pamphlet of IMP centered on strong criticism of the West and portrayed Pakistan as its "slave"; the text presented anti-imperialist, nationalist, and populist views and called for armed jihad. It also stated the group was inspired by various Islamic revivalist and jihadist figures, such as anti-colonial activist Syed Ahmad Shaheed, Jamiat Ulama-e-Hind leader Maulana Mahmud Hasan and Taliban founder Mullah Muhammad Omar. The pamphlet stated that the goal of IMP was the establishment of Islamic governance in Pakistan. The group seeks to implement this goal by attacking and weakening the Pakistani government.

The media wing of Ittihad-ul-Mujahideen Pakistan is Sada-e-Ghazwat-ul-Hind, and its spokesperson is Mahmood ul-Hasan. Its social media presence is multifaceted, with the group itself and its various factions each maintaining affiliated accounts which post and share each others material, which includes content on attacks, preparations, and training, as well as ideological material. Harakat-e-Inqilab-e-Islami has been considered the most active among them on social media.

== Activities ==
=== 2025 ===
On 25 April 2025, Ittihad-ul-Mujahideen Pakistan ambushed a station house officer's car in Bannu District using an IED, two officers were injured. On 4 September 2025, IMP conducted a suicide attack against Federal Constabulary base in Khyber Pakhtunkhwa province using a vehicle carrying an IED. According to the government, the attack killed 6 officers, IMP claimed the attack killed 20 officers.

In July 2025, IMP claimed to have conducted three quadcopter drone attacks on military facilities in Mir Ali and Bakka Khel. On 8 July 2025, IMP announced its first joint attack with Tehreek-e-Taliban Pakistan in Orakzai District. IMP reported that they destroyed a military vehicle and seized three G3 rifles and a light machine gun. In October 2025, IMP claimed responsibility for armed attack on a checkpoint in Peshawar District that killed seven officers. Pakistani police chief said that 6 suicide bombers were used for the attack, 13 officers were injured. On 15 October 2025, IMP claimed responsibility for killing a police officer guarding polio vaccination workers in Nowshera District.

=== 2026 ===
In January 2026, Pakistan conducted six drone strikes against IMP, killing 27 militants. Days later, IMP claimed to have stolen an anti-drone gun from security forces during clashes. In February 2026, a team of Counter Terrorism Department officers who were transporting a prisoner were ambushed in Bannu District. During the gunfight, detained IMP commander Usama Daniyal Baghi was killed. Baghi was accidentally killed by gunfire from the attackers trying to rescue him; no officers were injured.

On 22 February 2026 IMP claimed responsibility for ambushing a military convoy. During the exchange, five IMP militants were killed. Commanding officer and a soldier were also killed after they were rammed by an IED-laden vehicle.

On 9 May 2026, Ittihad-ul-Mujahideen Pakistan conducted a suicide attack on military post in Bannu District, killing 14 and injuring 3 police officers. Several IED-laden vehicles and a suicide bomber were used for the attack. Dawn reported that surrounding civilian areas suffered significant damage, 3 civilians were injured. A state of emergency was declared in Bannu hospitals.

July 2026 proved to be the most lethal month for Pakistani security forces in nearly 10 years with 198 security forces killed. Most likely perpetrators being Pakistani Taliban and Ittihad-ul-Mujahideen Pakistan.

On 18 September 2026, IMP claimed responsibility for an armed attack on the police headquarters in Kohat. Police said 31 people, including 16 police officers, were killed and more than 100 others were injured in the attack. The group used IED-laden vehicles and deployed several gunmen who engaged in a shootout with the police and Pakistan Army for 22 hours.
