= Asim Umar =

Al-Qaeda leader and conspiracy theory author

- Born: 1974/1976; Sambhal, Uttar Pradesh, India
- Died: 23 September 2019 (aged between 42 and 45); Musa Qala District, Helmand Province, Afghanistan
- Military career
- Allegiance: Al-Qaeda
- Branch: Al-Qaeda in the Indian Subcontinent
- Rank: Emir of AQIS

Sana-ul-Haq (1974/1976 – 23 September 2019), better known as Asim Umar, was an Indian Jihadist militant leader of the Al-Qaeda in the Indian Subcontinent. Al-Qaeda leader Ayman Al-Zawahiri announced the creation of AQIS and introduced Asim Umar as its leader in a video posted online in September 2014.

Outside his militant activities he was also an author of what Praveen Swami calls "several best-selling dystopic jihadist fantasies that give fascinating glimpses into the inner world of Islamists", centered on a global conspiracy involving the Dajjal and Jews as well Islamic eschatology.

== Biography ==
=== Early life and education ===
He was born Sana-ul-Haq into an influential peasant family (his grandfather was a village pradhan, his grand uncle a freedom fighter and great-grandfather a district magistrate under the British rule), between 1974-76 in Sambhal, Uttar Pradesh, India. He attended the Darul Uloom Deoband seminary in Uttar Pradesh, India and graduated from there in 1991. In the late 1990s, he visited Pakistan.

Umar studied at Jamia Uloom-ul-Islamia in Karachi and the Darul Uloom Haqqania in Khyber Pakhtunkhwa. His friend in Jamia Uloom-ul-Islamia, Moazzam, said of him that at that time "he was known for his very strong views against democracy and in favor of jihad. He could be described as a version of Anwar Awlaki, who was good in indoctrination too." Before joining militancy, he was himself a teacher in a madrassa in Karachi and used to translate jihadist literature from Pashto to Urdu.

=== Militancy ===
Umar is said to have traveled to Afghanistan where he met Osama bin Laden, and later joined Harkat-ul-Jihad Al-Islami (HUJI), a Jihadist group with branches across the Indian subcontinent. Umar's affiliation with Al-Qaeda was reportedly solidified after the Pakistani government's 2007 storming of the radical Lal Masjid seminary, resulting in the deaths of many militants. He is said to have made contact with Ilyas Kashmiri, a top jihadist with close links to Al-Qaeda.

In 2009, Indian intelligence officials visited Asim Umar's house in Deepa Sarai, Uttar Pradesh. Umar was missing for 14 years at that time and was presumed dead. Indian officials informed Umar's family that their son was alive and working for a terrorist organisation. After hearing the news, Umar's father promptly inserted advertisements in newspapers where he disowned his son.

Umar quickly began playing a prominent role as a propagandist in video releases from Al-Qaeda and authored at least four books promoting jihad. By April 2014, several months before being named leader of AQIS, Al Qaeda was identifying Umar as the head of its sharia committee in Pakistan.

In September 2014, Al-Qaeda leader Ayman Al-Zawahiri announced the creation of Al-Qaeda in the Indian Subcontinent (AQIS) and introduced Asim Umar as its leader in a video posted online.

In 2016 and 2018, the United States had designated Asim Umar a Specially Designated Global Terrorist in the Specially Designated Nationals and Blocked Persons List.

=== Death ===
On 23 September 2019, Afghan officials announced that Asim Umar was killed in a joint US-Afghan military raid in the Afghan Province of Helmand. 40 Afghan civilians and six other Al-Qaeda militants were also killed in the raid.

== Books ==
He wrote "a number of conspiracy theory books", centered around Islamic eschatology and the Dajjal, that he himself translated from Urdu into Arabic, Pashto and Uzbek languages, including:

- Teesri Jang-e-Azeem Aur Dajjal (transl. World War III and Dajjal)
- Dajjal Ka Lashkar: Black Water (transl. Army of Anti-Christ: the Black Water)
- Imam Mehdi ke Doost aur Dushman (transl. Friends and Foes of the Mahdi [Messiah])
- Bermuda Tikon aur Dajjal (transl. Bermuda Triangle and Dajjal)
- Adyan ki Jang (transl. War of Ideologies)
- Ghaltiyan (transl. Mistakes)
