= Shakil Auj =

Pakistani writer killed by al-Qaeda on 18 September 2014

- Born: 1 January 1960; Karachi, Sindh, West Pakistan
- Died: 18 September 2014 (aged 54)
- Education: University of Karachi
- Occupations: Scholar, reformer, writer, quranist

Hafiz Muhammad Shakil Auj TI was a Pakistani Islamic scholar and author. He also served as a professor and dean at Karachi University's faculty of Islamic Studies. During his career, Auj taught at the Karachi University for nineteen years, including heading the Islamic Studies department between 1 February 2012 until his assassination on 18 September 2014 by Al-Qaeda. During this time, Auj authored fifteen books on Islamic studies. Auj had received Tamgha-e-Imtiaz (English: Medal of Excellence) from the President of Pakistan for his contributions to the field of Islamic education. Auj was noted as an Islamic reformist for his liberal interpretation of Islam.

Auj held a PhD in Islamic jurisprudence from the University of Karachi. Prior to his assassination, Auj had been accused of blasphemy.

== Career ==
Auj was the Dean of the Faculty of Islamic Studies at the University of Karachi. He also was director of the Seerat Chair at the University of Karachi, ex-director of the Sheikh Zayed Islamic Centre, and a member of the Senate of Federal Urdu University. He was a disciple of Shah Ahmad Noorani.

Auj published fifteen books and more than one hundred research articles on issues pertaining to the immediate needs of the society, in accordance with Quranic interpretation. He was part of numerous religious and social awareness programs on different television channels.

Auj was a strong advocate of women's rights. He wrote his book Nisaiyaat; (meaning Issues pertaining to women) which was labelled by The New York Times as the first feminist book in the context of the Quran. In the book, he argues that Muslim women are allowed to marry non-Muslim men, and that girls should be both mentally and physically mature before they are married. He received threats from extremists, and was stopped from launching the book. He was strongly criticized by the orthodox clergy for this book.

Auj's book Tabeerat relates to the Islamic principles in the contemporary world. In one chapter, he elaborates on the way non-Muslims may be accepted by God if they remain committed to universal human values. He also explains the way the Quran encourages a moderate society based on universal human values, and how Islam can very easily connect to the modern world. His book Sahib E Quran is about the honor and attributes of the Prophet Muhammad. He started the book with the Na`at. In one chapter, he expresses the view that there is only defensive holy war in Islam.

Auj was founder and editor-in-chief of HEC's research journal Al-Tafseer. He was a member of the editorial board of journals; JIHAR; IJTIHAD; FIKR-O-NAZR; Peace and Peshawar Islamics. He was a member of the Committee on Development of Social Sciences and Humanities (CDSSHR), Pakistan and the Board of Trustees, International Islamic University, Islamabad, the sub-committee of Islamic Studies & Arabic, HEC, Islamabad, and chair of the Tahqeeq-o-Tafseer Welfare Association. He was a member of the Institute of Education and Research, Islamabad.

Auj was honoured with the honorary degree of Ijaza in Hadith by Shaik-ul-uHadiths Mufti Anwar Ullah of Aleemiyah Institute of Islamic Studies, Karachi. He was awarded Tamgha-e-Imtiaz by the President Mamnoon Hussain of Pakistan.

== Controversy ==
Auj had been a moderate in the context of the Quran and established Sunnah. He suffered a backlash from the orthodox majority in his department and in Pakistan. By assuming power as the Dean of Faculty of Islamic studies, he cracked down extensively on faculty members involved in academic and moral corruption. He was reluctant to let Dr. Jalaluddin Ahmed Noori rejoin as a faculty member after his suspension on the basis of having plagiarised his PhD thesis and several research papers. HEC declared him blacklisted as well. However, the Karachi University Syndicate, under pressure from several religious and political figures, let him rejoin. He also restrained seminary students from enrolling in MS programs without a proper channel. Director Sheikh Zayed of the Islamic Centre and Dr. Noor Ahmed Shahtaz were declared ineligible by the inquiry committee on the basis of forged degrees. Auj took charge as director on 28 June 2012 but was unable to take office immediately due to a court order.

== Death ==
Auj was killed on 18 September 2014 by al-Qaeda (AQIS) while going to an event at an Iranian cultural centre organized in his honor for his contribution and services to Islam.

== Selected bibliography ==
- Quran majeed k 8 muntakhib tarajim ka taqabuli jaaiza
- Nisaiyaat (Urdu, Arabic)
- Sahib-e-Quran
- Tabiraat
- Khawaja Ghulam Fareed kay Mazhabi Afkaar
- Afkaar e shagufta
- Usool e Hadith and Tareekh e Hadith
- Usool e Tafseer and Tareekh e Tafseer etc
