= Harakat-e-Inqilab-e-Islami =

Militant group formed in 2025 in Pakistan

Harakat-e-Inqilabi Islami Pakistan
- Leader: Amir Ghazi Shahabuddin
- Dates active: 2025 - 2026
- Country: Pakistan
- Part of: Ittehad-ul-Mujahideen Pakistan

Harakat-e-Inqilab-e-Islami Pakistan (Urdu: حرکت انقلاب اسلامی "Islamic Revolutionary Movement") is a militant group formed in Pakistan in early 2025, led by Amir Ghazi Shahabuddin. The group is suspected to have historical links to Harakat-i Inqilab-i Islami, an Afghan faction active during the Soviet–Afghan War. The group vowed to fight against the Pakistani state and establish an Islamic Emirate of Afghanistan-style government.

Unverified reports also suggest possible ties to Al-Qaeda.

Lashkar-e-Islam announced the formation of an alliance, Ittehad-ul-Mujahideen Pakistan, with two other factions of the Pakistani Taliban, Hafiz Gul Bahadur and the recently formed, Harakat-e-Inqilab-e-Islami, The Khorasan Diary reported on April 12. The alliance will be represented by "Sadaye Ghazwat-ul-Hind" as its media mouthpiece, with Mahmud-ul-Hasan as its ‘spokesperson’. The statement calls on other Pakistani jihadist factions to join, aiming to "organize jihad among the Mujahideen".
