= Raymond Allen Davis incident =

Killing of two Pakistani men causing diplomatic incident

Raymond Allen Davis
- Born: October 2, 1974 (age 52); Wise, Virginia, U.S.
- Occupation: Private security contractor
- Employer(s): Central Intelligence Agency, based at the American consulate in Lahore
- Criminal charges: Double homicide, illegal possession of a firearm
- Criminal status: Pardoned and released after payment of diyya to victims' families
- Spouse: Rebecca Davis (m. 2004; div. 2013)

Raymond Allen Davis is a former United States Army soldier, private security firm employee, contractor with the Central Intelligence Agency (CIA), and convicted criminal who killed three unarmed Pakistani men in Lahore and triggered a diplomatic crisis between the United States and Pakistan in 2011.

On January 27, 2011, Davis shot two men in the back, killing both, in Lahore, Pakistan. At least one of the men was armed. Immediately after the shooting, a car coming to aid Davis killed a third Pakistani man, Ibadur Rahman, in a hit and run while speeding on the wrong side of the road. In the aftermath of the incident, the U.S. government contended that Davis was protected by diplomatic immunity because of his employment with the American consulate in Lahore. However, he was jailed and criminally charged by Pakistani authorities with two counts of murder and the illegal possession of a firearm. On March 16, 2011, Davis was released after the families of the two killed men were paid US$2.4 million in diyya (a form of blood money compensation in Islamic law). Judges then acquitted him on all charges, and Davis immediately left Pakistan.

The incident led to a diplomatic furor and deterioration in Pakistan–United States relations. A major focus of the incident was the U.S. government's assertion that Davis was protected under the principle of diplomatic immunity due to his role as an "administrative and technical official" attached to the American consulate in Lahore. The United States claimed that Davis was protected under the Vienna Convention on Diplomatic Relations and demanded he be released from custody immediately. Barack Obama, then-President of the United States, asked Pakistan not to prosecute Davis and recognize him as a diplomat, stating, "There's a broader principle at stake that I think we have to uphold." Pakistani officials disputed the claim of immunity from a murder charge, asserting that Davis was involved in clandestine operations, and questioned the scope of his activities in Pakistan. The Pakistani Foreign Ministry stated that "this matter is sub judice ["under adjudication"] in a court of law and the legal process should be respected." Pakistani Foreign Minister Shah Mahmood Qureshi stated that, according to official records and experts in the Foreign Office, Davis was "not a diplomat and cannot be given blanket diplomatic immunity"; Qureshi claimed that his stand on the issue allegedly led to him being sacked as the foreign affairs minister.

The aftermath of the shooting led to widespread protests in Pakistan, demanding action against Davis.

Almost a month after the incident, U.S. officials revealed Davis was a contractor for the CIA after it was reported in The Guardian. According to The Telegraph, he was the acting CIA Station Chief in Pakistan.

An unnamed official with Pakistan's Inter-Services Intelligence (ISI) stated that Davis had contacts in the Federally Administered Tribal Areas along the Afghanistan–Pakistan border and knew both of the men that he had shot. He stated that the ISI would investigate the possibility that the encounter on the streets of Lahore stemmed from a meeting or from threats to Davis. Some media outlets have suggested, according to anonymous sources, that data retrieved from Davis's phones and GPS device indicated that he had been to Islamabad, Lahore, Peshawar and some areas in the tribal belt of the country that have been the subject of U.S. drone attacks. These attacks were interrupted for several weeks after Davis's arrest before resuming on March 18, 2011, in a strike at Datta Khel, two days after Davis left Pakistan.

== Incident ==
Davis indicated in his written statement that the incident happened when he was coming from the consulate, although the report from Pakistani police stated that the GPS record showed he was coming from his private residence at Scotch Corner, Upper Mall. Davis stated that after withdrawing cash from a bank cash machine, he was driving alone in his white Honda Civic and had stopped at a traffic light near Qurtaba Chowk in the Mozang Chungi area of Lahore when two men pulled alongside him on a motorbike. After one of the young men allegedly brandished a pistol, Davis opened fire and killed both of them with his own 9mm Glock pistol.

The two men were identified as Faizan Haider, 22 years old and Faheem Shamshad (also known as Muhammad Faheem), 26 years old. Davis told police that he acted in self-defence. The police were unable to find any eyewitnesses to support Davis's contention that the deceased men brandished a weapon. Police confirmed that Faheem was carrying a pistol at the time of the shooting. According to the investigative officers, when Davis fired at Faizan and Faheem, they were sitting on their bike in front of his car with their backs towards Davis. Davis shot them through his windshield. After the shooting, Davis is alleged to have exited his car to take pictures and videos of the casualties with his cell phone. There are additional reports that Davis shot five rounds through his windshield, got out of his vehicle and shot four more rounds into the two men as they lay on the pavement. The police report notes that both witnesses and Davis reported that Davis fired from behind Haider as Haider was running away.

Davis then radioed for backup. Minutes later, four men in a Toyota Land Cruiser with fake registration plates made an unsuccessful attempt to reach the scene. Stopped in a traffic jam, the driver of the Land Cruiser jumped the median on Jail Road and traveled against the oncoming traffic. The Land Cruiser collided with a motorcyclist unconnected to the initial incident, later identified as Ebadur Rehman (also transliterated Ibad-ur-Rehman). Faizan Haider died at the scene, while both Faheem Shamshad and Ibad-ur-Rehman were taken to Services Hospital, Lahore and subsequently also died. Security camera footage of the damaged vehicle after its fatal collision with Rehman were later shown on Pakistani Geo TV. Pakistani official requested the U.S. to produce the men, who had come from the same suburban house where Davis lived and had the same diplomatic visas, for questioning, but the U.S. refused and the men left Pakistan.

After the accident, the vehicle fled the scene and proceeded without stopping to the U.S. Consulate, jettisoning items outside Faletti's Hotel. Police say they included four magazines containing 100 bullets, various battery cells, a baton, scissors, a pair of gloves, a compass with knife, a black colored mask/blindfold, and a piece of cloth bearing the American flag. Davis also attempted to leave the scene in his vehicle, but he was apprehended by two traffic wardens at Old Anarkali Food Street in Anarkali Bazaar and handed over to police.

According to news sources, items recovered from Davis's car included a Glock handgun, an infrared light, a portable telescope, GPS equipment, two cellphones, a satellite phone, 9mm ammunition, multiple ATM and military ID cards, and a camera containing pictures of "prohibited areas such as installations along the border with India". Pakistani media also reported that Davis also carried multiple ATM and military ID cards and what was described as a facial disguise or makeup. The Pakistani official said Davis also carried identification cards from the U.S. consulates in Lahore and Peshawar but not from the U.S. embassy in Islamabad.

== Investigation ==
Police stated that the two men that were shot by Davis were carrying sidearms but that no shots were fired from these weapons. It is disputed whether the firearms were licensed or not. A senior police officer has said that Haider had a criminal record and was previously involved in dacoity, but neighbors, friends and family of the young men stated that they had no criminal records or history of illegal activity.

The police officer in charge of the investigation, Zulfiqar Hameed, was initially reported as having said that eyewitness testimony suggested that the men were trying to rob Davis. Later press statements from the Lahore Police Chief, Aslam Tareen, explain that police rejected Davis's plea of self-defence precisely because of eyewitness statements. Tareen, describing the shooting as "a clear-cut murder," explained that the self-defence plea "had been considered but the eyewitnesses, the other witnesses and the forensic reports ... showed that it was not a case of self-defence."

The Toyota Land Cruiser that killed Rehman had the fake number plates LZN-6970. Investigations have revealed that the car number was actually registered in the name of Sufi Munawwar Hussain, a resident of Sahiwal district in Punjab province. The men driving the car were allegedly heavily armed and came from Davis's suburban house, raising concerns amongst officials that they were also CIA. The men, who had the same diplomatic visas as Davis, left the country after the U.S. refused Pakistani requests to interview them.

After the incident multiple Pakistani officials told ABC News that both men Davis killed were working for Inter-Services Intelligence and were following Davis because he was spying and had crossed a "red line". This was initially denied by U.S. officials. The Express Tribune also reported that the two dead motorcyclists were intelligence operatives, quoting a Pakistani security official who requested not to be identified since he was not authorized to speak to the media. Pakistani officials alleged that Davis had travelled to the Federally Administered Tribal Areas and met with some people without the approval of ISI and therefore was being followed in an attempt to intimidate him. Davis alleged that the men he shot were trying to rob him but the police delayed registering cases against Haider and Shamshad.

== Diplomatic status ==
The U.S. and Pakistani governments did not agree as to Davis's legal status in Pakistan at the time of his arrest. The U.S. government claimed that Davis was a diplomat and should neither have been arrested nor should be prosecuted under Pakistani law because he had diplomatic immunity under the Vienna Convention on Diplomatic Relations. The Punjab authorities (the province in which Davis was arrested) claimed that Davis was not on a diplomatic visa but on an official business visa.

According to U.S. officials cited in The New York Times, senior Pakistani officials "believed in private that Davis had diplomatic immunity but that the government was unwilling or unable to enforce the protocol". After senior Pakistani official, Information Secretary of the PPP Fauzia Wahab made statements reflecting her personal belief that Davis did have diplomatic immunity, she resigned her post rather than testify. A contempt of court petition was filed against her in the Lahore High Court.

In two articles appearing in the Pakistani newspaper The Express Tribune, the precise status of Davis's and the American government's claim of immunity was examined by Najmuddin Shaikh, a former Pakistani diplomat. He wrote that the question of diplomatic immunity depended on whether Davis was on the staff of the "consulate" or the "embassy" as the privileges and immunities of each are very different. Shaik wrote that if Davis was on the staff of the "embassy", the question of immunity would depend upon whether Davis was in Mozang Chowrangi in the "course of his duties" and questioned who should decide that. Regarding the law concerning if Davis was on the "consular" staff, a practising lawyer in Islamabad, Mirza Shahzad Akbar, referred to the Vienna Convention of 1963 in The News International, writing: "one needs to read Article 41 (1) which says: Consular officers shall not be liable to arrest or detention pending trial, except in the case of a grave crime and pursuant to a decision by the competent judicial authority. Now having read the law, there should be no doubt in anyone's mind that if a member of US Consulate in Lahore kills someone, he is answerable to a court of law in that jurisdiction, as there is no other crime more heinous or more grave than murder." Pakistani investigators took the position that Davis did not shoot the two men acting in self-defence and the police recommended he face a charge of double murder.

Davis in the mobile phone video of his interrogation did not claim that he had a diplomatic rank, but rather that he was "doing consulting work for the Consul General, who is based at the US consulate in Lahore." The Consul General at that time was Carmela Conroy. In the video, Davis is heard and seen showing several ID badges around his neck, and states that one is from Islamabad, and one is from Lahore. He then adds, "I work as a consultant there".

According to USA Today, "U.S. officials in Islamabad will say only that he was an American Embassy employee who was considered part of the 'administrative and technical staff'."

Ejaz Haider pointed to this difference, writing, "This has now been changed to this man being an employee of the US embassy. Why? Because, and this is important, there are two different Vienna Conventions, one on diplomatic relations (1961) and the other on consular relations (1963)."

Davis was not one of the embassy employees listed on January 25, 2011, two days before the incident. However, a revised list submitted a day after the incident on Jan 28 carried his name. Pakistani officials believe that his name was missing from the Jan 25 list because at that time he was assigned to the consulate general. It has been assumed that he was put on the list given subsequently so that he could benefit from Vienna Convention on Diplomatic Relations 1961 instead of 1963 Convention on Consular Relations that have a narrower scope in terms of immunity.

== Davis's background ==
United States Army records indicate that Davis is a native of Wise, Virginia, and spent 10 years in the U.S. Army, being discharged in 2003. Davis served in infantry units. He received basic training at Fort Benning in Georgia, served six months with the United Nations peacekeeping force in Macedonia in 1994, and later joined the Special Forces. Davis's final assignment with the army was weapons sergeant with the Fort Bragg, North Carolina–based 3rd Special Forces Group.

After his military service, Davis was the operator of "Hyperion Protective Consultants, LLC" a company organized as an LLC. Varying reports indicate that the firm is based in either Nevada or Orlando, Florida. The company's website was taken down after the incident, but before its removal the website described the firm as specializing in "loss and risk management." According to the BBC, "the offices that the company says it had in Orlando have been vacant for several years and the numbers on its website are unlisted."

Davis was also a CIA contractor as an employee of Blackwater Worldwide (now Academi).

== Davis's activities in Pakistan ==
It was reported in one of the Pakistani newspapers following his arrest, the police recovered photographs of sensitive areas and defence installations from Davis's camera, among which included snapshots of the Bala Hisar Fort, the headquarters of the paramilitary Frontier Corps in Peshawar and of the Pakistani Army's bunkers on the Eastern border with India. The Government of Punjab considered Davis a security risk after the recovery of the photos. Prosecutors also suggested that Davis be charged with espionage. In particular, Davis' main espionage activities were against Lashkar-e-Taiba (LeT) and Pakistan's nuclear facilities. The LeT also demanded the death penalty for Davis.

On February 28, Dawn News reported that law enforcement agencies arrested 45 individuals in Pakistan for staying in constant contact with Davis. Other media reported at the same time that at least 30 suspected covert American operatives had suspended their activities in Pakistan and 12 already left the country.

It is believed that Washington halted the CIA drone attacks in the Federally Administered Tribal Areas, which had been occurring at the average rate of two to three per week since 2008, after Raymond Davis was arrested to avoid further straining the tense situation. There were no reported drone attacks from January 23, four days before the Raymond Davis incident, until February 21.

== Aftermath ==
The government of Pakistan was under extreme pressure from the United States to release Davis. News reports indicate that the Pakistani Embassy in Washington was cut off from all communications with the United States Department of State over this issue. Diplomatic notes were sent by the U.S. Government to Pakistan's Foreign Office urging it to grant diplomatic immunity to Davis. A delegation of the United States House Committee on Armed Services conveyed a veiled threat that Pakistan–US defense cooperation could be under cloud if the standoff persisted on the issue of immunity for Davis.

In another incident, ABC News reported that two Pakistani officials claimed that the Pakistani ambassador to the U.S., Husain Haqqani, received threats from the U.S. National Security Advisor Tom Donilon of being removed if action was not taken on the Davis case. Haqqani however categorically denied the allegation. According to the same report, Donilon also warned of U.S. consulates closing down in Pakistan and an upcoming visit by Pakistan's president, Asif Ali Zardari, to Washington being rejected.

It was also reported that top Pakistani Foreign Office officials alleged Zardari instructed the Foreign Office in categorical terms that Davis be given diplomatic immunity and for this purpose the Foreign Office should immediately issue a backdated letter notifying Davis as 'member of staff member of the US embassy, in Islamabad.' Former foreign minister Shah Mehmood Qureshi refused, saying: "on the basis of the official record and the advice given to me by the technocrats and experts of the Foreign Office, I could not certify him (Raymond Davis) as a diplomat. The kind of by blanket immunity Washington is pressing for Davis, is not endorsed by the official record of the Foreign Ministry." Qureshi reiterated this stance after a meeting with Senate Foreign Relations Committee Chairman John Kerry on February 16. Qureshi said he kept quiet on the Davis case earlier upon instructions from the leadership of the Pakistan People's Party (PPP), but implied that his stance on the matter had cost him his job. As of February 16 a new foreign minister has not yet been appointed.

The Guardian reported that a number of U.S. media outlets learned about Davis's CIA role but "kept it under wraps at the request of the Obama administration." Colorado television station KUSA (9NEWS) learned that Davis worked for the CIA speaking to Davis's wife, who referred inquiries to a Washington, D.C. number for the CIA. The station then "removed the CIA reference from its website at the request of the U.S. government."

On February 6, Shamshad's widow, Shumaila Kanwal, committed suicide with an overdose of pills, fearing that Davis would be released without trial, police and doctors said.

== Release ==
Charges were dropped and Davis was released after payment to the families of the two people he had shot. He was released under a principle of sharia (Islamic law) that allows murder charges to be dismissed if diyya is paid to the deceased's families (if and only if, they agreed without any pressure), an arrangement which is legal and common in Pakistan.

A senior Pakistani official stated that between $1.4 and $3 million was paid to families of the deceased. U.S. Secretary of State Hillary Clinton stated that the U.S. government had not paid money for Davis to be released. Davis was also fined Rs20,000 by the judge for possessing illegal firearms. An attorney representing the families said that the Pakistani government paid the diyya, but U.S. officials indicated that the U.S. government would reimburse Pakistani authorities. Asad Manzoor Butt, a lawyer who had been representing the deceased's relatives, told the media outside the jail that he had been detained for several hours by the prison administration and the heirs had been forced to sign the diyya papers.

After being released, Davis was flown to Bagram Airfield in Kabul aboard U.S. aircraft. He was accompanied on the flight by Cameron Munter, the U.S. ambassador to Pakistan. A senior U.S. official told The Washington Post that Davis was flown there because U.S. wanted Davis out of Pakistan as soon as possible and "it was the closest place" and stated that Davis was in "good spirits." The Pakistani newspaper The News International stated that Davis left Lahore at 4:53 p.m. aboard the Viper 18, a 12-seat Cessna and claimed that there were "strong indications" that four family members of the Pakistani men (Imran Haider, brother of Faizan Haider, and Mohammad Waseem, brother of Mohammad Fahim, and two other family members) were on board the plane.

In December 2012, the Washington Post stated without more details that U.S. Senator John Kerry helped broker the release of Davis.

== Events after release ==
There have been allegations of further repercussions stemming from the Davis incident. A petition has been filed in the Lahore High Court, alleging that family members of the two victims have gone missing. Maulana Fazal-ur-Rehman, a politician opposed to U.S. presence in Pakistan, has blamed the "Raymond Davis network" for a March 31, 2011 bomb attack targeting him. According to unnamed sources, Davis provided extensive information under interrogation on foreign spy networks in Pakistan, causing some foreign agents to flee the country. Overall, the Raymond Davis incident was detrimental to U.S.-Pakistani relations, possibly even leading to the cessation of all joint operations between Pakistan and the CIA.

On October 1, 2011, Douglas County, Colorado, sheriff's deputies arrested Davis in Highlands Park, Colorado, at the Town Center in Highlands Ranch, for third-degree assault and disorderly conduct, both misdemeanors, stemming from a dispute between Davis and 50-year-old Jeff Maes about a parking space. Maes and his family got to a parking spot first and parked in it. A witness told police that Davis then confronted Maes and said, "I was waiting for that spot and it wasn't right for you to take it." When Maes refused to move, Davis struck Maes. The blow sent Maes to the ground. Davis was released on a $1,750 bail bond. When prosecutors later learned that Maes may have suffered a broken vertebra in the incident, they increased one of the charges against Davis to second-degree assault (a felony), a crime of violence that carries a five-year mandatory minimum, and Davis's bond was raised to $10,000. Neither Maes nor a third man present at the scene have been charged in the incident. Davis later pleaded guilty to misdemeanor third-degree assault and received a two-year probationary sentence.

In 2013, Raymond and his wife Rebecca divorced amicably, ending their marriage which began in 2004.

=== Davis' book ===
In June 2017, Davis launched his book titled The Contractor: How I Landed in a Pakistani Prison and Ignited a Diplomatic Crisis, detailing his narration of the incident and the events which unfolded during his imprisonment in Pakistan. In the book, Davis made several adversarial claims about the Pakistani government and military establishment's actions, and their involvement with respect to his case. He claimed that his release was finally facilitated following a secret meeting in Oman between CIA chief Leon Panetta and ISI chief Ahmad Shuja Pasha. Pakistan's former interior minister Rehman Malik termed the book a "pack of lies" maligning Pakistan's government and military, denying allegations regarding the extent of Pasha's role, and accused Davis of ulterior motives.

An editorial in Dawn noted: "the book cannot be taken as a complete account of what occurred because some details will undoubtedly have been removed by US government censors who authorised the book's publication. But the book itself is a reminder of how opaque Pakistan-US security relations have been and perhaps continue to be." The editorial also noted that Davis' account of his exit suggested "a range of Pakistani officials bent over backwards to ensure his release" which appeared plausible in light of the U.S. government's public position. However, what could not be ascertained is "whether Pakistani military and government officials were arm-twisted and what were the parameters of the debate surrounding Mr Davis's possible release inside Pakistani policymaking circles."

== See also ==
- Pakistan–United States relations
