= 2026 Kabul restaurant bombing =

2026 terrorist attack in Afghanistan

Kabul Chinese Restaurant Explosion Incident
- Part of Islamic State–Taliban conflict
- Location: 34.5319922°N 69.1735724°E; Kabul
- Date: January 19, 2026; 9 months ago 15:00–15:30 (AFT)
- Target: Chinese citizens
- Attack type: Suicide bombing
- Deaths: 8 (including the perpetrator)
- Injuries: 13 - 20
- Perpetrator: Islamic State - Khorasan Province
- Motive: Sinophobia; Response to persecution of Uyghurs in China

On 19 January 2026, IS–K carried out a suicide bombing targeting a Chinese restaurant called "China Lanzhou Beef Noodles" in the urban area of Kabul, Afghanistan around 15:00–15:30 AFT (UTC+4:30), killing at least 7 people and injuring at least 13. The dead included one Chinese Muslim and six Afghans. There were some additional 13 to 20 casualties, of which five were reportedly Chinese citizens. Amid the aftermath, Salafi jihadist organization IS claimed responsibility for the attack, while articulating that the target is against Chinese citizens.

== Background ==
Shahrnau has always been considered a relatively stable area in Kabul, with numerous embassies, large shopping malls, and commercial office buildings located within its boundaries. Since the Taliban retook power in 2021, internal conflicts at scale has mostly decreased, despite the Islamic terrorism actions on foreign nationals are seemly unaffected.

Since the fall of Kabul, the PRC authority has maintained close relationships with the Taliban government, with an ever-increasing amount of Chinese investors seeking to place entities within. Prior to this attack, Kabul experienced another deadly attack in 2022 against a hotel popular with Chinese tourists, which was also claimed by the Islamic State.

== Reactions ==
- Afghanistan: The Ministry of Interior Affairs and Afghan police stated that authorities are conducting further investigations into the cause of the explosion and the background of the attackers, and reiterated their commitment to maintaining domestic security to protect the safety of people and property, including foreign investors.
- China: Spokesperson of the PRC Foreign Ministry Guo Jiakun stated on Jan. 20th that China strongly condemned the terrorist attack and had made urgent representations to Afghanistan regarding the incident, requesting it to thoroughly investigate the incident and effectively strengthen security. At the same time, the Chinese government issued a security alert, advising Chinese citizens to avoid traveling to Afghanistan in the near future, and urging Chinese citizens and companies already there to evacuate high-risk areas as soon as possible.

== See also ==
- List of terrorist incidents linked to Islamic State – Khorasan Province
- List of terrorist incidents in 2026
- Sinophobia
