= Datta Khel airstrike =

2011 American airstrike in Khyber Pakhtunkhwa, Pakistan

- Part of Insurgency in Khyber Pakhtunkhwa
- Type: UAV-strike
- Location: Datta Khel, North Waziristan, Pakistan; 33°09′N 70°26′E
- Target: Taliban fighters
- Date: 17 March 2011
- Executed by: CIA
- Casualties: 44 killed 10 injured
- Location within Pakistan

The Datta Khel airstrike was an American airstrike carried out on 17 March 2011 in Datta Khel, North Waziristan that killed 44 people and led to widespread condemnation in Pakistan. Sherabat Khan Wazir, a top commander of Hafiz Gul Bahadur's Taliban faction, was killed in the strike, and in response Bahadur threatened to end the peace deal struck with the Pakistani government almost four years earlier. The airstrike was part of a long series of drone attacks in Pakistan carried out by the CIA and United States military. It occurred just two days after diyya, a form of compensation paid to a victim's family under Islamic law, was paid for the release of U.S. CIA operative Raymond Allen Davis, signaling a resumption of U.S. activity after a several week hiatus while Davis' pardon on murder charges was being negotiated.

== Attack ==
According to Pakistani intelligence officials, the attack targeted a compound where several dozen people believed to be Taliban militants linked to Hafiz Gul Bahadur were meeting. On 17 March 2011, two or three missiles were fired within three minutes, killing at least 44 people and injuring around fifteen others. A security official in Peshawar said that the building that was attacked was used as a training location and meeting place for militants. A car that was transporting additional suspected militants near the location of the primary target was also fired upon.

Of those killed, a Pakistani security official said that eleven Taliban personnel were killed in the attack, while the remainder were civilians. According to a local tribesman, however, the suspected militants were actually a group of tribal elders from a nearby village who were having a business meeting. The meeting was said to be regarding the disputed sale of a chromite mine in the area. The tribesman said that a commander loyal to Bahadur, Sharabat Khan, was present, but only because he was also a tribal elder. Khan was reported to have been killed in the attack. After the attack the Taliban faction led by Hafiz Gul Bahadur threatened to cancel the peace deal with Pakistani government to protest the governments inability to halt drone attacks.

== Reaction ==
General Ashfaq Parvez Kayani, the Chief of Army Staff of Pakistan Army, issued a statement saying that the attack was "in complete violation of human rights" and that "such aggression against people of Pakistan is unjustified and intolerable under any circumstances." Prime Minister Yousaf Raza Gillani condemned the attack, saying that it would only strengthen the hands of militants. The governor of Khyber Pakhtunkhwa, Syed Masood Kausar, also strongly condemned the attack, saying that civilians and policemen were killed.

Pakistan foreign secretary Salman Bashir asked the U.S. ambassador to Pakistan, Cameron Munter, for an explanation and an apology. After the attack, Pakistan said it would not attend talks with the United States on 26 March 2011 in Brussels to discuss the future of Afghanistan. The foreign ministry of Pakistan stated that "[i]t is evident that the fundamentals of our relations need to be revisited… Pakistan should not be taken for granted nor treated as a client state." The US embassy in Pakistan refused to comment, saying it was not aware that such talks had been proposed.

The attack came shortly after CIA contractor Raymond Allen Davis, who had been arrested on charges of killing two people in January, was released, and protests against his release were expected to intensify after the drone strike.

=== Protests ===
Thousands of Pakistani protesters took to the street following the attack. The US Embassy in Islamabad and consulates in Karachi, Lahore and Peshawar were closed due to security concerns. Thousands of protesters gathered in the capital Islamabad, chanting "[f]riends of the US are traitors", "[d]own with America" and "[h]ang Zardari." In Miranshah more than a thousand locals collected and demanded compensation for the dead and an immediate stop to the drone attacks.

=== Military ===
After the attack, the Pakistani Air Force increased air patrols of the northwestern tribal areas in Pakistan. It also cancelled holidays and breaks for officials in the region.

== See also ==
- 2009 Makin airstrike
- Gora Prai airstrike
- List of drone strikes in Pakistan
- Pakistan–United States relations
- Waziristan War
