= 2026 Thessaloniki firebombs =

Firebombing attacks in Thessaloniki, Greece

2026 Thessaloniki firebombings
- Location: Thessaloniki, Greece
- Date: 1 July 2026
- Attack type: Firebombings
- Weapon: Crude explosive devices made with camping gas canisters
- Deaths: 1
- Injuries: 4
- Perpetrator: Unknown
- Motive: Under investigation

On the early hours of 1 July 2026, a series of firebombs exploded in Thessaloniki outside the homes of members belonging to the New Democracy, the leading party in Greece. The two suspected perpetrators, a 29-year-old man and a 26-year-old woman, were arrested nine days later alongside a man accused of hiding them

Crude explosive devices made with camping gas canisters were used in the attack. All the injuries were sustained from the last of the three attacks, where cars and motorcycles were set ablaze.

The main attacck occurred against parliamentary candidate for the New Democracy party, Afroditi Nestora, who suffered burns, while her mother succumbed to her wounds in an intensive care unit. Two other residents in the apartment building were also hospitalized.
