= Kunar =

Kunar may refer to:

== Places ==
- Kunar, Budaun, a village in India
- Künar, Kale, a village in Turkey
- Kunar Province, Afghanistan
  - Islamic Emirate of Kunar, a 1991 quasi-state in Kunar Province
- Kunar River, Afghanistan and Pakistan
- Kunar Valley, Afghanistan and Pakistan

== Other uses ==
- Kunar Hembram (born 1962), Indian politician
- Kunar snowtrout, a species of ray-finned fish
- Raid on Kunar, a 2012 NATO operation in Kunar Province, Afghanistan
