= Hafiz Gul Bahadur Group =

Faction of the Pakistani Taliban

- حافظ گل بہادر گروپ
- Flags used by Hafiz Gul Bahadur group
- Leader: Hafiz Gul Bahadur
- Dates active: 2007 – present
- Merged into: Ittehad-ul-Mujahideen Pakistan
- Headquarters: Khost, Afghanistan (since 2021)
- Active regions: Pakistan; Afghanistan
- Ideology: Sunni Islamism; Deobandi
- Size: 1000–1500
- Part of: Tehrik-i-Taliban Pakistan
- Wars: War in Afghanistan; War in North-West Pakistan; Global War on Terrorism; 2026 Afghanistan–Pakistan war

Hafiz Gul Bahadur Group (HGBG; Urdu: حافظ گل بہادر گروپ) is a faction of the Pakistani Taliban (TTP) based in Eastern Afghanistan. HGB largely operates across Pakistan-Afghanistan border in the regions like North Waziristan and surrounding districts of the former FATA region in Khyber Pakhtunkhwa, Pakistan. The group is led by tribal leader Hafiz Gul Bahadur, who is affiliated with the Afghan Taliban and the Haqqani Network. Though the group had previously directed most of its attacks against the Afghan government and NATO forces during the war in Afghanistan, it has since targeted the Pakistani government after the fall of Kabul in 2021. Militants affiliated with HGB have been linked to several high-profile attacks on Pakistani security forces in the ongoing insurgency in Khyber Pakhtunkhwa.

HGB traces its roots from the tribal followers of Hafiz Gul Bahadur. Bahadur organized resistance against a Pakistani operation in the northwest in 2005, later signing a peace deal with the government in 2006 and becoming the leader of the local Taliban in North Waziristan. Bahadur was named first deputy of the Pakistani Taliban upon its formation in December 2007, but infighting plagued the group due to Bahadur's insistence on attacking targets in Afghanistan and not the Pakistani government. HGB's acceptance of the Pakistani government had led them to be dubbed the 'good Taliban' by media and government sources. HGB's peace agreement with the Pakistan ended in 2014 with the launch of an offensive against all militants in the area, including HGB. After a Taliban offensive in 2021 defeated the Islamic Republic of Afghanistan, HGB has shifted its activities against Pakistan and has collaborated further with the TTP. The group has been suspected of using Afghanistan as a launching ground for its operations against Pakistan.

== History ==
After the subsequent invasion of Afghanistan, many militants including that of the Afghan Taliban, al-Qaeda and other Central Asian groups from Afghanistan fled to northwest Pakistan, where Bahadur was one of many tribal leaders who gave them refuge. As a leader of the Utmanzai Wazir, Bahadur maintained a loyal following of men reportedly numbering in the thousands. Utilizing his position, Bahadur served as chief negotiator in multiple peace talks and ceasefires between tribal militants and the Pakistani government. He rose to prominence in 2005 for leading armed opposition against the Pakistani military which had begun operations in 2004 to evict foreign fighters, mainly al-Qaeda, from Waziristan. Bahadur's hostility to the Pakistani government seemingly changed in September 2006 after signing a peace treaty with the government agreeing to expel foreign fighters, the deal being heavily influenced by the Afghan Taliban and Haqqani Network. After signing the treaty, Bahadur became the leader of the local Taliban in North Waziristan, where he effectively governed the region with the acceptance of Pakistan while maintaining ties with the Afghan Taliban and participating in the neighbouring war. Bahadur eventually resumed hostilities with the Pakistani state in July 2007. Amid peace talks, the Pakistani Taliban was officially formed in December 2007 with Bahadur being named as first deputy leader under Baitullah Mehsud, who led armed opposition against Pakistan. Bahadur distanced himself from the TTP as Mullah Omar opposed its foundation, instead calling for focus upon coalition and security forces in Afghanistan. Bahadur signed a peace agreement with the government on 18 February 2008. On 22 February 2009, Bahadur reconciled with Mehsud and other TTP leader Maulvi Nazir, forming an alliance to direct attacks on NATO forces in Afghanistan, while Bahadur and Nazir still remained pro-Pakistani government. Due to their lingering allegiance to Pakistan, the alliance broke down shortly after its formation, with HGB's relations remaining strained with the TTP.

HGB began taking more significant action against Pakistan from June 2009 as the government began to crack down on the TTP and Baitullah Mehsud. Bahadur opposed US drone strikes within Pakistan, threatening to pull out of their agreement with the government after the Datta Khel airstrike on 17 March 2011 which killed HGB commander Sherabat Khan Wazir. HGB's peace treaty with Pakistan eventually came to an end in May 2014 after they accused the government of violating their treaty with the launch of Operation Zarb-e-Azb. The group announced the shifting of all operations out of Afghanistan and into Pakistan and forced members to sever ties with the Pakistani government by 10 June. Significantly weakened by the operation, HGB and many other TTP elements fled to Afghanistan.

With the Taliban takeover of Afghanistan in 2021, HGB's main target, the Islamic Republic of Afghanistan, had been defeated. With the installment of a Taliban government, both HGB and the TTP's goals have reportedly shifted, with HGB claiming multiple attacks upon Pakistani security forces in the ensuing years, including through collaborative operations with the TTP. The Pakistani government has accused the Afghan Taliban of allowing HGB and commander Hafiz Gul Bahadur to reside in Afghanistan and use their land as a staging ground for attacks in Khyber Pakhtunkhwa.

On 28 June 2025, a suicide car bombing targeted a Pakistan Army convoy in Mir Ali, North Waziristan, resulting in the deaths of 13 to 16 soldiers and injuring numerous others, including civilians. The attack took place during an active curfew and was claimed by a suicide wing of Hafiz Gul Bahadur’s faction, which operates under the umbrella of the Tehrik-i-Taliban Pakistan (TTP). While the Pakistani government initially blamed India, the claim made by Bahadur’s group and reported by AFP clearly attributed the attack to domestic insurgent activity, reinforcing his faction’s ongoing involvement in anti-state violence in the region.

== Activity ==
=== 2023 ===
On 3 June, HGB and the TTP launched a joint attack on a security checkpoint in Jani Khel, Bannu, killing two soldiers and losing two members in a gunfight.

On 26 November, a suicide bomber on a motorcycle attacked a security convoy in Bannu, killing two civilians and injuring three soldiers. The attacker was an Afghan citizen affiliated with HGB.

=== 2024 ===
On 16 March, HGB militants attacked a military post in North Waziristan, ramming a suicide car bomb into the post before starting a firefight. The attacked killed 7 soldiers and 6 HGB fighters.

On 15 July, HGB carried out an attack on an army cantonment in Bannu which killed 8 soldiers and wounded 141 people. The attackers utilized a suicide bomber to breach the cantonment walls before gunmen stormed the base.

On 9 August, HGB launched three attacks on different military posts in Tirah along the Afghan border, killing three Pakistani soldiers and wounding dozens while suffering four casualties.

=== 2025 ===
On 28 June, a suicide car bombing targeted a military convoy in Mir Ali, North Waziristan, killing between 13 and 16 soldiers and wounding many others, including civilians. The attack occurred during a curfew, and HGB claimed responsibility for the bombing.

On 12 April, Lashkar-e-Islam, Harakat-e-Inqilab-e-Islami and Hafiz Gul Bahadur Group announces the creation of ‘Itteihad-ul-Mujahideen Pakistan’ alliance in collaboration with TTP.

== Jaish-e-Fursan-e-Muhammad ==
Jaish-e-Fursan-e-Muhammad (JFM) is a subgroup of HGB that was seemingly formed in 2024 for the purpose of fighting Pakistani security forces. JFM is believed to be a front for HGB, in line with the TTP's usage of front groups such as Tehreek-e-Jihad, in order to claim plausible deniability for attacks in Pakistan. The group has claimed multiple attacks in Khyber Pakhtunkhwa, including the Bannu Cantonment attack.

== Designation as a terrorist group ==
The group was designated a terrorist organization by Pakistan on 31 July 2024.

== Hafiz Gul Bahadur ==
Hafiz Gul Bahadur
- Born: 1961 (age 64–65)
- Military career
- Allegiance: Hafiz Gul Bahadur Group (until 2026)
- Conflicts: War in North-West Pakistan

Hafiz Gul Bahadur (Urdu: حافظ گل بہادر, born c.1961) hails from the Madda Khel clan of the Utmanzai Wazir and was raised in a village in North Waziristan. He is the direct descendant of religious extremist and anti-colonial militant Mirzali Khan, also known as the Faqir of Ipi, who had fought against Pakistan during the Waziristan rebellion (1948–1954).

Bahadur attended a Deobandi madrassa in Multan, Punjab and participated in the Soviet–Afghan War and Afghan civil war, the latter which he likely fought on the side of the Afghan Taliban through developing ties with the Haqqani Network. He was also a leader of the student wing of Jamiat Ulema-e-Islam-Fazal (JUI-F) in North Waziristan, receiving attention in 2001 for recruiting a militia of 4,000 in opposition to United Nations monitors who were set to deploy along the Afghanistan-Pakistan border in order to prevent flow of weapons to the Afghan Taliban. The deployment didn't occur due to the September 11 attacks.

In 2005 the Pakistani military began operations within North Waziristan to pursue foreign, mainly al-Qaeda, militants fleeing from South Waziristan. They met resistance from militant groups led by Hafiz Gul Bahadur, among others. In September 2006 he negotiated a peace deal with the Pakistani military in which he agreed to expel all foreign militants, such as al-Qaeda and Uzbek militants, from Pakistani soil.

After a year of fighting US-led forces in Afghanistan, he returned to Pakistan in late 2007. During late 2007 and early 2008, Bahadur refused to assist Baitullah Mehsud against the Pakistani Army and urged him to refrain from fighting Pakistani forces in Razmak, North Waziristan.

Upon the formation of the Tehrik-i-Taliban Pakistan (TTP) in December 2007, he was announced as the militant group's overall naib amir under Baitullah Mehsud, who was based in South Waziristan, but has largely distanced himself from the TTP due to rivalries with Mehsud and disagreements about the TTP's attacks against the Pakistani state. Although no formal announcement of leaving the TTP occurred, Gul Bahadur often refused to coordinate activities with the TTP against the government.

In July 2008 Gul Bahadur and Maulvi Nazir, leader of the Ahmedzai Wazirs in South Waziristan, announced the creation of the Muqami Tehrik-e Taliban, translated as the Local Taliban Movement and also referred to as the "Waziri Alliance", with Gul Bahadur as its leader and Nazir as his deputy.

In late 2008 missile strikes from U.S. drones in North Waziristan strained the peace deal with Islamabad that he had agreed previously to observe in 2006. In March 2011 he threatened to pull out of the peace deal with Pakistani government after one of his top commanders Sherabat Khan Wazir was killed in Datta Khel airstrike.

In 2014 conflicting reports suggest that air strikes conducted in Datta Khel Tehsil of North Waziristan Agency have killed key commanders of the Hafiz Gul Bahadur group including Gul Bahadur.

Following the Fall of Kabul (2021), the Gul Bahadur Network’s ties to the Haqqani network and TTP have significantly improved, resulting in a sharp increase in cross border militant incursions along the Pakistan-Afghanistan international border.

Hafiz Gul Bahadur is closely allied with Sirajuddin Haqqani and provides him with a rear base in North Waziristan. Anti-American Taliban are headed by Gul Bahadur and Haqqani network.

Pakistani outlets claimed to have eliminated Hafiz Gul Bahadur and Noor Wali Mehsud in October 2025, however both later released proof of life addressing the alleged airstrikes that killed them.

== See also ==
- Drone attacks in Pakistan
- War in North-West Pakistan
