= Al-Qaeda in the Indian subcontinent =

Islamist militant organisation

- جماعة قاعدة الجهاد في شبه القارة الهندية
- Flag of AQIS
- Leaders: Asim Umar † (2014–19); Osama Mahmood (2019–present)
- Dates active: 3 September 2014 – present
- Merger of: Various Pakistani, Indian, Bangladeshi and Afghan Jihadist factions
- Allegiance: Al-Qaeda; Ittehad-ul-Mujahideen Pakistan (suspected since 2025)
- Groups: Ansarullah Bangla Team; Harkat-ul-Jihad al-Islami; Ansar Ghazwat-ul-Hind; Lashkar al-Zil; Muslim United Liberation Tigers of Assam (until 2016)
- Headquarters: Eastern Afghanistan
- Active regions: Indian subcontinent
- Ideology: see list: Deobandism Deobandi jihadism Islamic fundamentalism Islamic extremism Sunni Islamism Jihadism Qutbism Anti-Indian sentiment Anti-Ahmadi Anti-Zionism Antisemitism
- Size: 180-400 in Afghanistan (UN report); Unknown in Pakistan and India
- Part of: Al-Qaeda; Ittehad-ul-Mujahideen Pakistan (suspected)
- Wars: War in Afghanistan
- Website: https://al-sahab.co/

Al-Qaeda in the Indian subcontinent (Arabic: جماعة قاعدة الجهاد في شبه القارة الهندية, romanised: Jamā‘at Qā‘idat al-Jihād fī Shibh al-Qārrah al-Hindīyah, lit. 'Group of the Base of Jihad in the Indian subcontinent') usually abbreviated as AQIS, is a branch of the pan-Islamist militant organisation al-Qaeda. After announcing the establishment of AQIS on 3 September 2014, Ayman al-Zawahiri declared that the branch's stated objectives involved fighting the governments of India, Myanmar, Bangladesh and Pakistan.

The formation of the group was part of al-Qaeda's efforts to capitalise on Pakistani military's policy of tolerance to anti-Indian insurgent groups, as well as to counter the expansion of the Islamic State militant group in the subcontinent. AQIS stated in 2014 that it views Pakistan as a "doorstep" to expand its war against India. The militant group has also stated its intentions to attack American targets in the Indian subcontinent. This group is listed as a terrorist organisation by the United Nations, United States, Canada, India and Pakistan.

== History ==
=== Before Al-Qaeda in the Indian subcontinent ===
Before coming together under AQIS, there were various jihadist factions operating in Pakistan, India, Bangladesh, and Afghanistan. One of these factions operated in Karachi, Pakistan, and were responsible for numerous attacks in the city. On 11 December 2014, AQIS issued a report detailing these attacks. The attacks targeted local police, a professor, and a blogger.

=== As Al-Qaeda in the Indian subcontinent ===
On 3 September 2014, Ayman al-Zawahiri, leader of al-Qaeda, announced the establishment of a new branch in the Indian subcontinent in a 55-minute video posted online. During the announcement, Zawahiri stated that it had taken two years to gather various jihadist factions into the new group, and introduced Asim Umar, an Indian national and a former commander of Tehrik-i-Taliban Pakistan (TTP), as its Emir.

The announcement also introduced the group's spokesman, Usama Mahmoud, who praised militant commanders like Amjad Farooqi, Ilyas Kashmiri and Hassan Ghul. Farooqi was killed by Pakistani security forces. Kashmiri and Ghul were killed by US drone strikes in Pakistan. The formation of the AQIS was part of Zawahiri's strategy to capitalise on Pakistani military's policy of tolerance towards anti-Indian insurgent groups, as well as to counter the expansion of the Islamic State militant group in the subcontinent.

On 11 December 2014, Pakistani police arrested Shahid Usman, the head of the al-Qaeda wing in Karachi, and four others in Karachi along with weapons and 10 kg of explosives. Ahmad Farooq, the deputy emir for AQIS, was killed on 15 January 2015 following a US drone strike in South Waziristan. Qari ‘Imran, a member of the group's ruling Shura Council, was killed on 5 January 2015 in a drone strike in North Waziristan.

In July 2018, United States designated Asim Umar a global terrorist.

Despite Zawahiri's announcement, Al Qaeda could not succeed in making any direct presence in India. Although some Kashmiris were arrested for assisting al Qaeda in the country, there is no evidence of any organised presence of the group in the region. Specifically, there has been no record of territorial claim, group activity or kidnapping of civilian or government officials by Al Qaeda. Some experts also suggest that Al Qaeda have links with some local Kashmiri factionist groups to spread insurgency in the Indian state of Jammu & Kashmir. Indian Prime Minister Narendra Modi told CNN in an interview with Fareed Zakaria that Indian Muslims would not be allied with Al Qaeda because of their patriotism, modernity and literacy.

On 23 September 2019, Afghan officials announced that they had killed Asim Umar, the head of al-Qaeda in the Indian subcontinent, during a joint US-Afghan military raid in Helmand province of Afghanistan. 40 Afghan civilians and 6 other Al-Qaeda militants were also killed in this raid.

== Relations with other Islamist factions ==
Since the 1980s, al-Qaeda has formed close relations with Islamist insurgent groups in Kashmir. In his announcement declaring the formation of AQIS, Ayman al-Zawahiri stated that sharia law has to be completely implemented under an Islamic state in Pakistan, while fervently denouncing the Indian government as an enemy of Islam. Al-Qaeda's emphasis on directing its enmity against India, while refraining from directly targeting Pakistan, is viewed as part of its strategy to strengthen its relations with Pakistan-backed militant groups.

In October 2014, a Kashmiri militant group calling itself "Ansar ut-Tawhid wal Jihad in Kashmir" published a video expressing support for Al Qaeda in the Indian subcontinent. The group offered to provide shelter to foreign fighters within AQIS as well as fight alongside it.

AQIS spokesman Usama Mahmoud, in series of tweets, expressed support for militant groups in Chechnya, Dagestan, and Yemen. He also gave a eulogy for al-Shabaab leader Ahmed Abdi Godane, who was killed in a US drone strike.

== Media ==
On 19 October 2014, a 117-page English-language magazine called Resurgence was released online. It was produced by the subcontinent branch of Al Qaeda's As-Sahab media production house, and the articles focused on waging jihad in the Indian subcontinent.

=== Statements ===
Al Qaeda in the Indian subcontinent has released multiple statements, mainly via the Twitter account of Usama Mahmoud, the group's spokesperson.

On 13 September 2014, Usama Mahmoud claimed responsibility for the attempted raid on a Pakistani naval frigate and the assassination of Pakistani Brigadier Zahoor Ahmad Fazal in Punjab Province. On 17 September, Mahmoud released a statement which justified the attempted attack on the Pakistani frigate, stating that America was the primary enemy of AQIS. On September 30, AQIS released another statement which said that the intended targets were the American and Indian navies.

On 14 October 2014, Mahmoud confirmed that AQIS senior leader Imran Ali Siddiqi was killed in a US drone strike. He also spoke about the US-led coalition in Iraq and Syria. Siddiqi was a member of the group's Shura council.

On 4 November 2014, Mahmoud released a series of tweets that condemned what he said as the "Infidel System." He also prayed for god to support militants in Chechnya, Dagestan, and Yemen, as well as Iraq and Syria. The following day, Mahmoud released a statement giving condolences for the killing of Somali al-Qaeda leader Ahmed Abdi Godane. He directed a statement to Somali fighters which said that the US must be fought.

AQIS released an audio message from its leader, Asim Umar, on 10 November 2014. Umar eulogised AQIS Shura Council member Imran Ali Siddiqi, who was killed in a US drone strike in the Federally Administered Tribal Areas.

On 20 November 2014, AQIS spokesman Usama Mahmoud released a statement confirming the death of two officials of the group in a US raid on the border between Pakistan and Afghanistan. One of the officials owned the house that Khalid Sheikh Mohammed lived in when he was captured. Four days later, Mahmoud gave a eulogy for the two officials, and urged Pakistani doctors and military officers to follow their example.

On 5 December 2014, AQIS published a photo showing the two officials who were killed in the US raid on the Afghan-Pakistani border, as well as a photo of the deceased son of one of the officials.

On 20 December 2014, Usama Mahmoud, spokesman for AQIS, condemned an attack on a school in Peshawar, Pakistan, which was carried out by the Pakistani Taliban. He said that the attack was un-Islamic and that "the massacre of innocent children makes our hearts burst."

On 7 June 2022, AQIS threatened suicide attacks in Gujarat, Uttar Pradesh, Mumbai and Delhi to "fight for the dignity of our Prophet" amid brewing controversy over the remarks by BJP leaders on the founder of Islam.

== Claimed, alleged and repudiated attacks ==
As of now, AQIS have carried out multiple terrorist attacks in Pakistan and Bangladesh:

- The group took responsibility for the 2 September 2014 assassination of Brigadier Fazal Zahoor, a senior officer in the Pakistani Army, who was shot dead by men riding motorcycles.
- Spokesman Usama Mahmoud claimed responsibility for a 6 September 2014 attack on a Naval dockyard in Karachi, reportedly carried out by former Pakistan Navy officers, who unsuccessfully tried to hijack a F-22P frigate. Three attackers were killed and seven were arrested by Pakistani forces. On September 30, AQIS released another statement which asserted that the attacks were carried by defectors within the Pakistani navy who "responded to the appeal of the scholars and jihad". AQIS stated that the target of the operation was the American naval fleet stationed in the dockyard.
- Spokesman Usama Mahmoud condemned on 20 December 2014 the Peshawar school attack.
- In video released on 2 May 2015, AQIS claimed responsibility for the death of four Bangladeshi bloggers; Avijit Roy, Oyasiqur Rahman Babu, Ahmed Rajib Haider and AKM Shafiul Islam. They also claimed responsibility for killing two Pakistani citizens, Dr Shakil Auj and blogger Aneeqa Naz. They mentioned Indian Prime Minister Narendra Modi.
- On 7 April 2016, AQIS claimed responsibility for the stabbing death of a blogger in Bangladesh by some Islamist militias.
- On 25 April 2016, AQIS claimed responsibility for the death of an LGBT activist in Dhaka, Bangladesh.
- On 7 September 2023, AQIS fighters collaborated with Pakistani Taliban militants in conducting an attack on Chitral District, Khyber Pakhtunkhwa, which killed four Pakistani soldiers.

== Criticism ==
The group has been condemned by other Muslim religious and political organisations including the Association of Indian Muslims, Indian American Muslim Council, Indian Minorities Advocacy Network, Indian Muslim Educational Foundation of North America, Indian Muslim Relief and Charities, Muslim Youth Awareness Alliance in India, and the Hefazat-e-Islam Bangladesh and Khelafat Majlish in Bangladesh and Burmese Muslim Association in Myanmar. A spokesman for Hefazat-e-Islam Bangladesh added:

There is prevailing a congenial and peaceful environment in Bangladesh. People are living in peace and in such a situation the announcement by Al Qaeda chief Zawahiri has made the people fearful and worried. Bangladesh had experienced earlier militant activities and terrorism by Jamaat-ul-Mujahideen Bangladesh and Harkat-ul-Jihad al-Islami. However, they could not emerge successful and Al Qaeda would not come out successful in Bangladesh despite their announcement.

== See also ==
- Al-Qaeda
- Shakil Auj
- Ansar Ghazwat-ul-Hind
- Islamic terrorism
