= Bakka, Haripur =

Bakka Jabbi(Bakka) Bakka
- Union council
- Location in Pakistan
- Coordinates: 33.9684°N 72.8344°E
- Country: Pakistan
- Region: Khyber Pakhtunkhwa
- District: Haripur District
- Tehsil: Haripur
- Time zone: UTC+5 (PST)

Bakka Jabbi(Bakka) (administratively known as Bakka) is one of the 44 union councils of Haripur District in Khyber Pakhtunkhwa, Pakistan. The settlement lies in the Hazara region and is located near the Haro River. Bakka Jabbi is the full local name used by residents of the area.

== Etymology ==
The name Bakka Jabbi is derived from local geographical features. "Jabbi" is a regional term used for rocky riverbanks or stony terrain. The village is located near the Haro River, and the name reflects the rocky landscape found along the river. The settlement is commonly referred to as Bakka, while Bakka Jabbi represents the full local name used by residents.

== History ==
According to the journal of James Abbott, who was boundary commissioner at the time, on 29 June 1847 a group referred to as the Gundgurrias crept into the defenceless "village of Bukka" and murdered in cold blood three sleeping women and several children.

== Geography ==
Bakka Jabbi is located in Haripur District of Khyber Pakhtunkhwa, Pakistan. The area lies in the Hazara region and is situated near the Haro River. The surrounding landscape consists of agricultural land, rural settlements, and rocky terrain associated with the riverbanks.

== Administration ==
Bakka serves as a local administrative unit of Haripur District and functions as a union council responsible for local governance and development within the area.

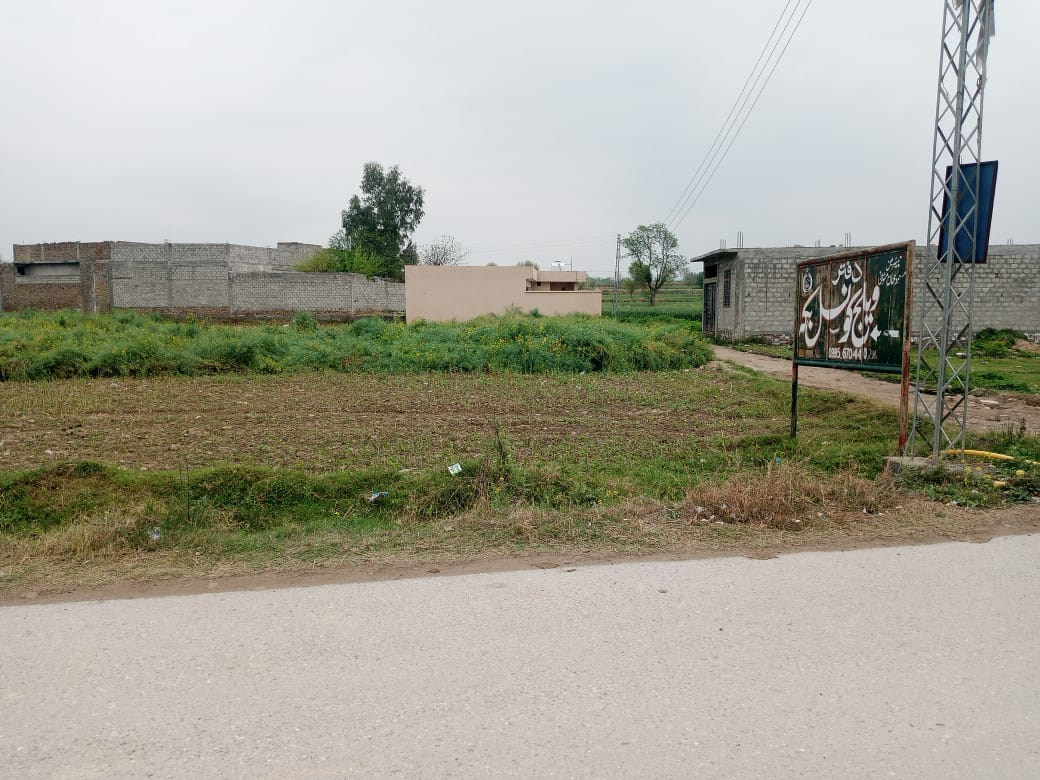
Village Council office building in Bakka Jabbi, Haripur District, Khyber Pakhtunkhwa, Pakistan.

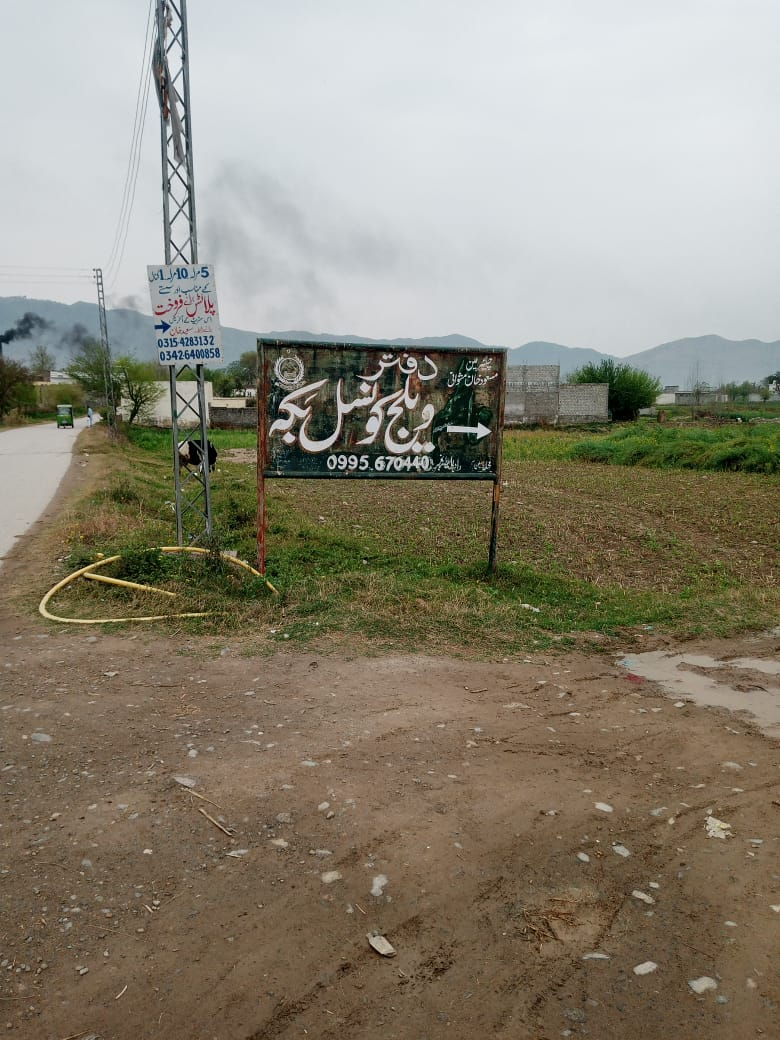
Another view of the Village Council office building in Bakka Jabbi.

== Education ==
Educational facilities in Bakka include government primary schools serving the surrounding villages.

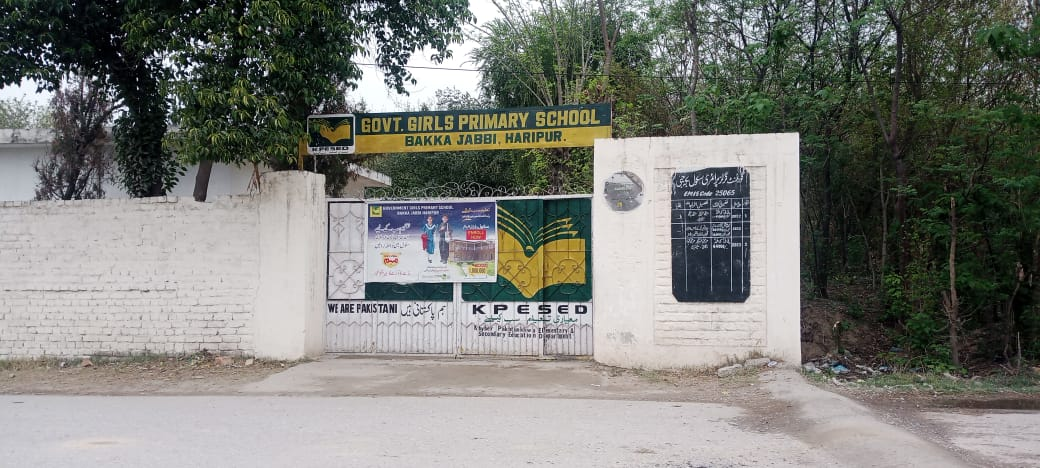
Government Girls Primary School in Bakka Jabbi village, Haripur District.

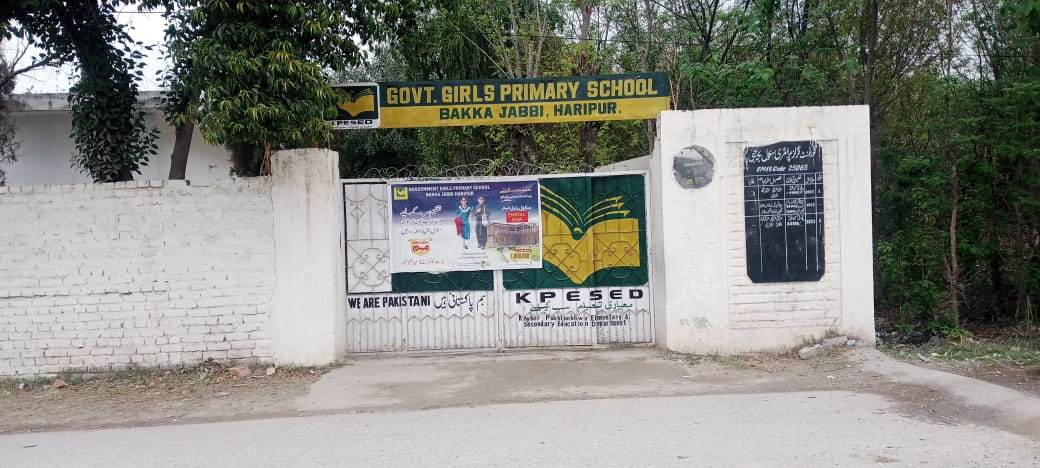
Another view of Government Girls Primary School in Bakka Jabbi.

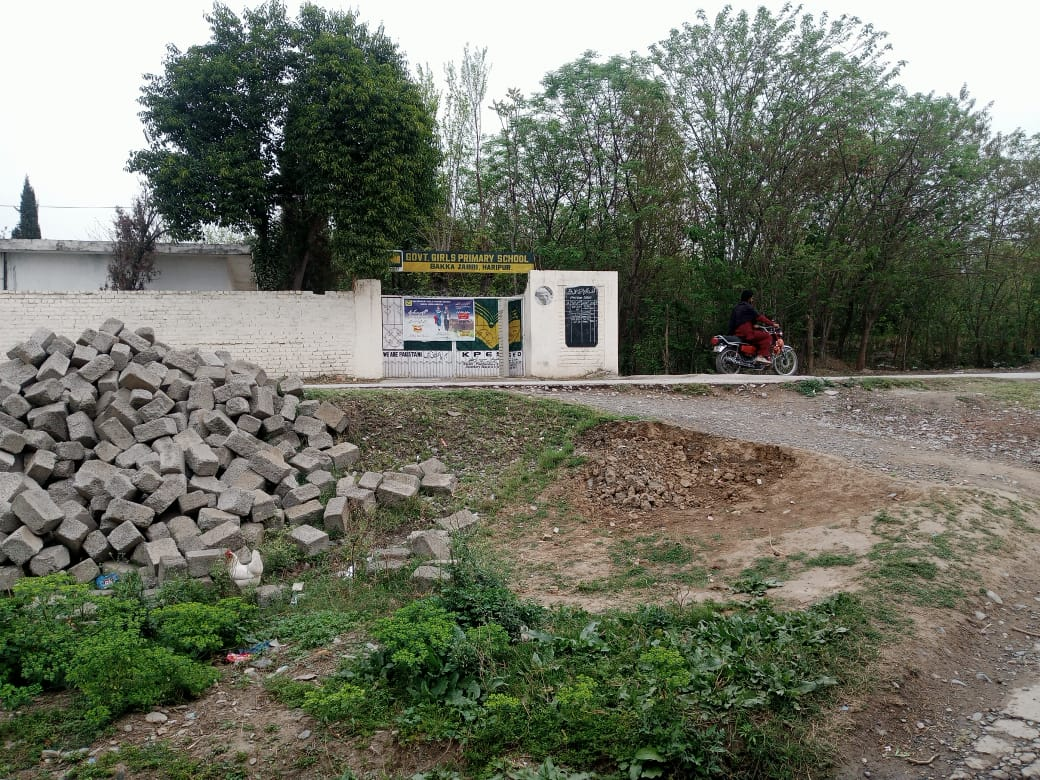
Government Girls Primary School building in Bakka Jabbi.

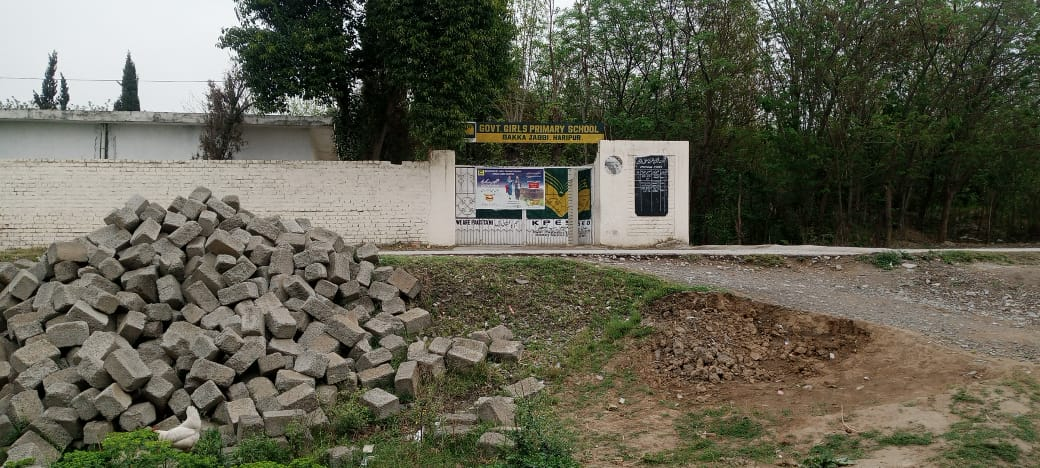
Government Girls Primary School campus in Bakka Jabbi.

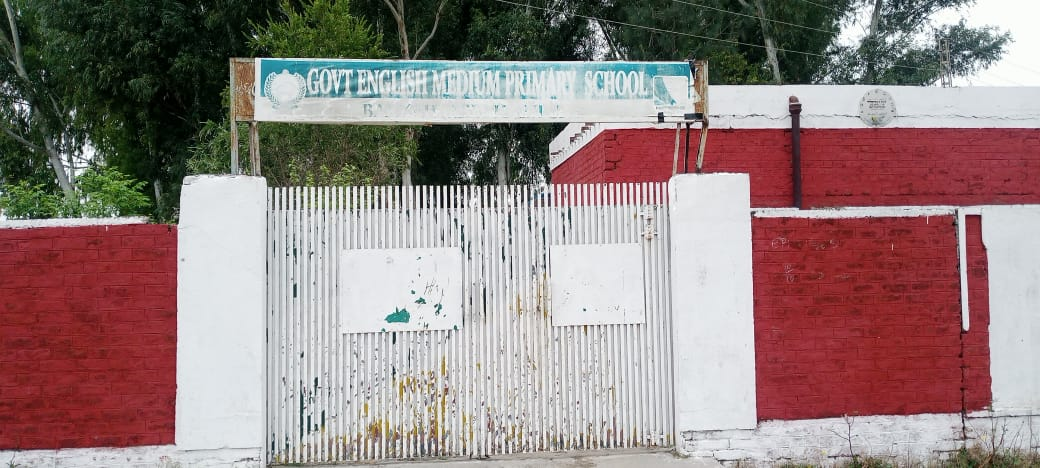
Government Primary School building in Bakka Jabbi, Haripur District.

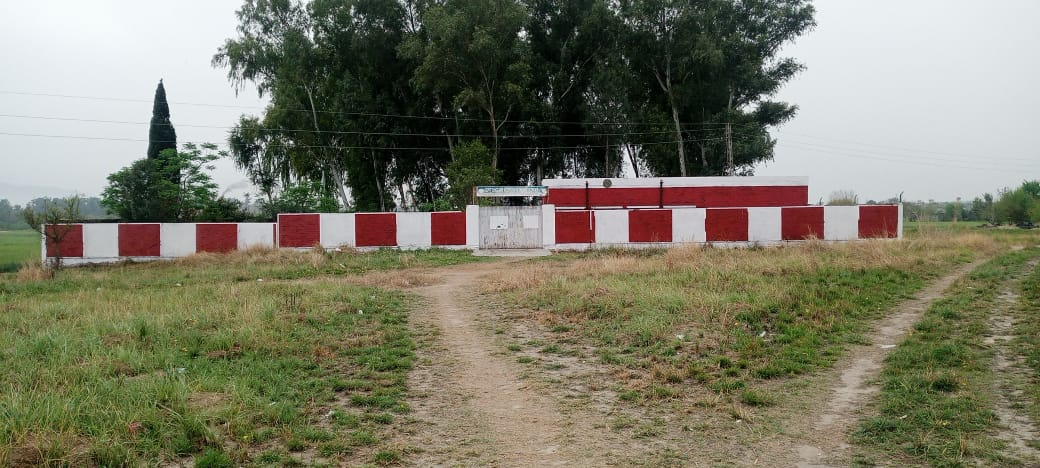
Another view of Government Primary School in Bakka Jabbi.

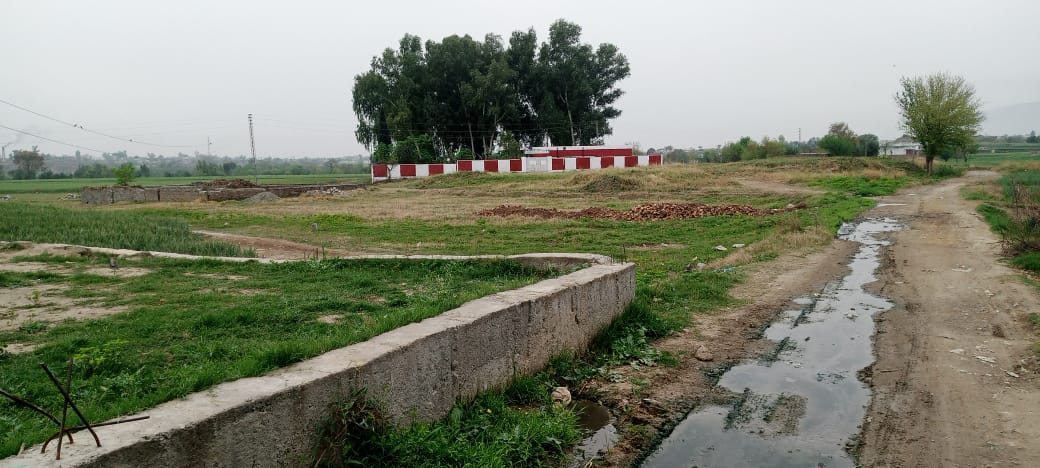
Government Primary School campus in Bakka Jabbi.

== Gallery ==
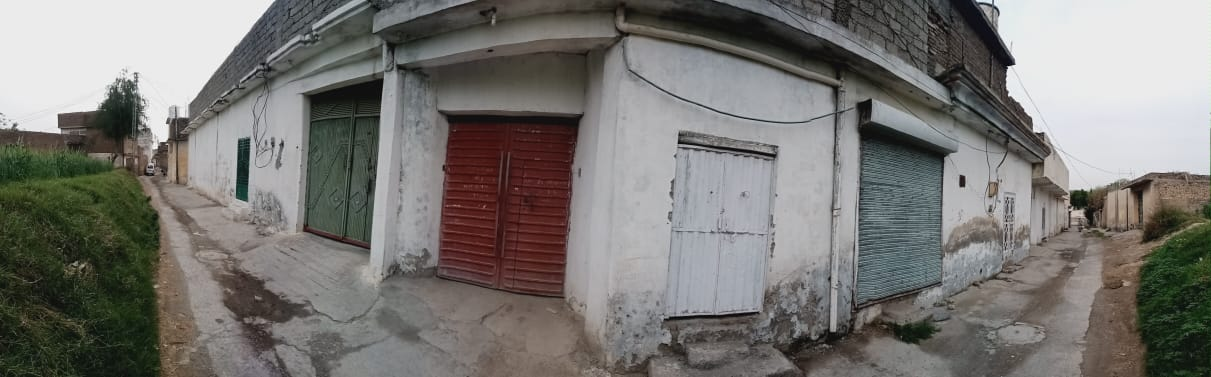
View of main street in Bakka Jabbi village in Haripur District.

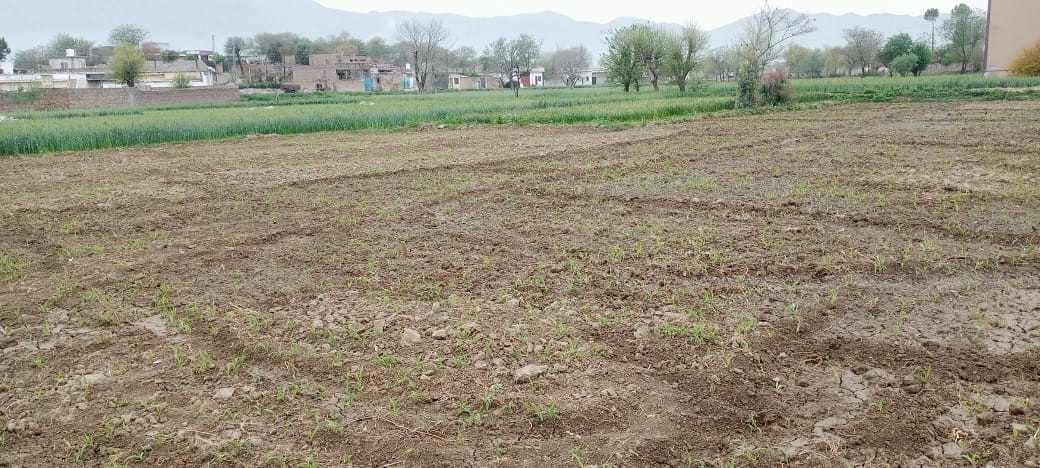
View of Bakka Jabbi village in Haripur District.

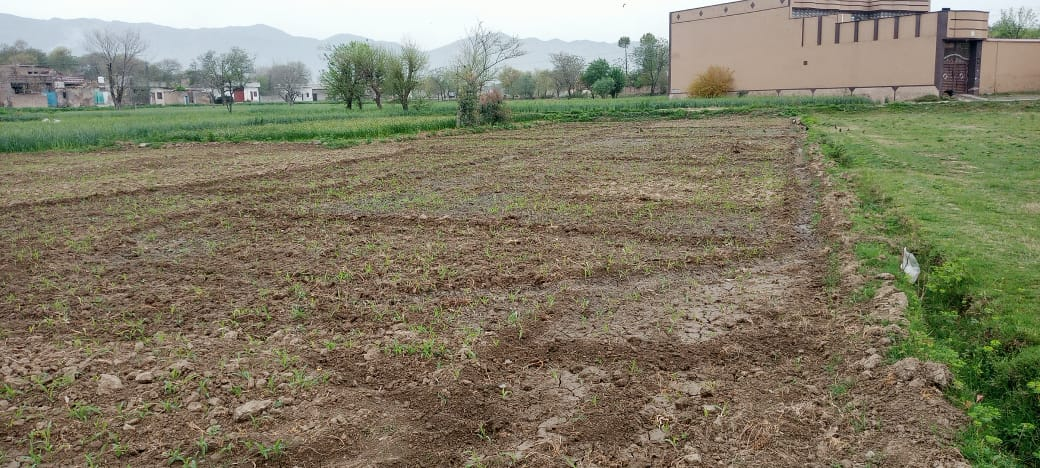
Landscape view of Bakka Jabbi village.

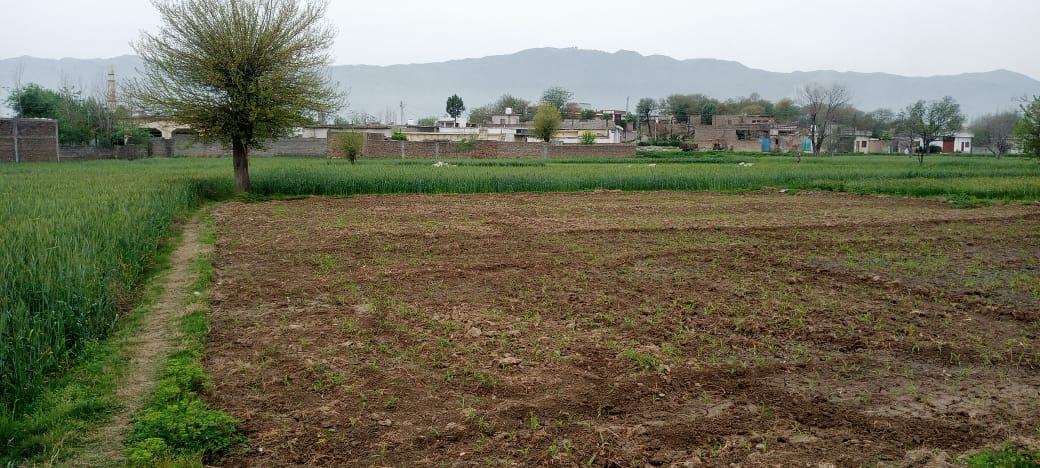
Residential area in Bakka Jabbi village.

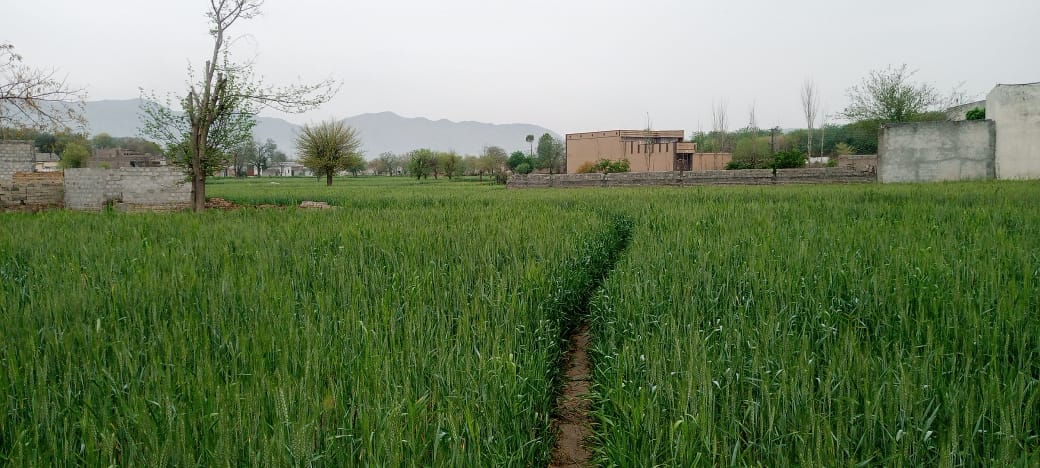
Village surroundings of Bakka Jabbi.

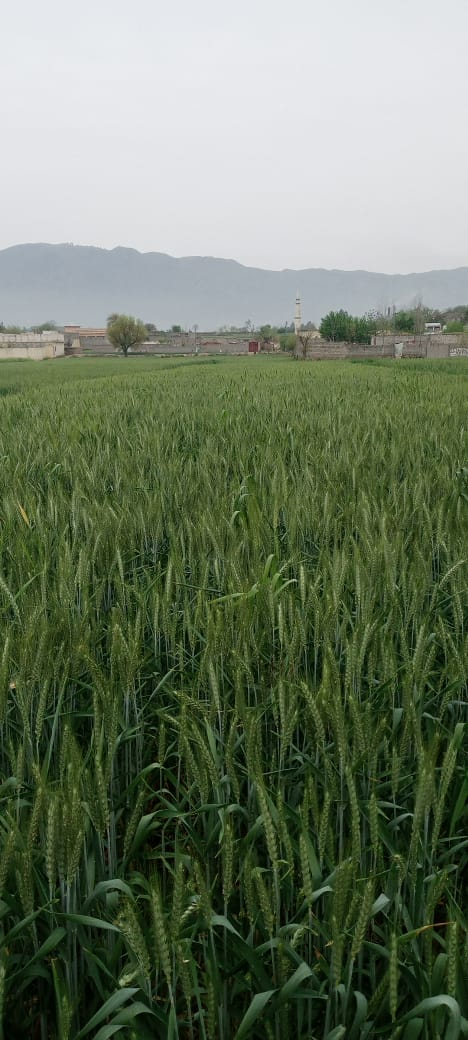
Agricultural land near Bakka Jabbi village.

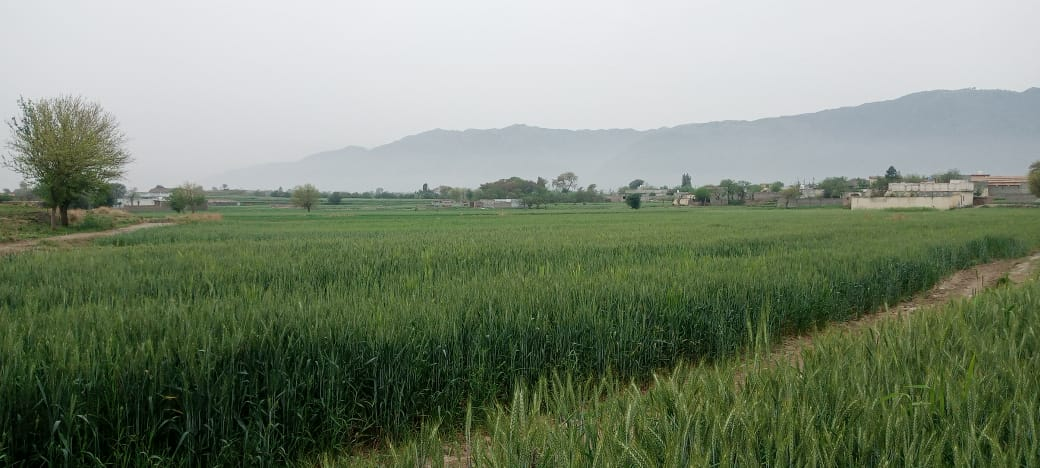
Another view of Bakka Jabbi village landscape.

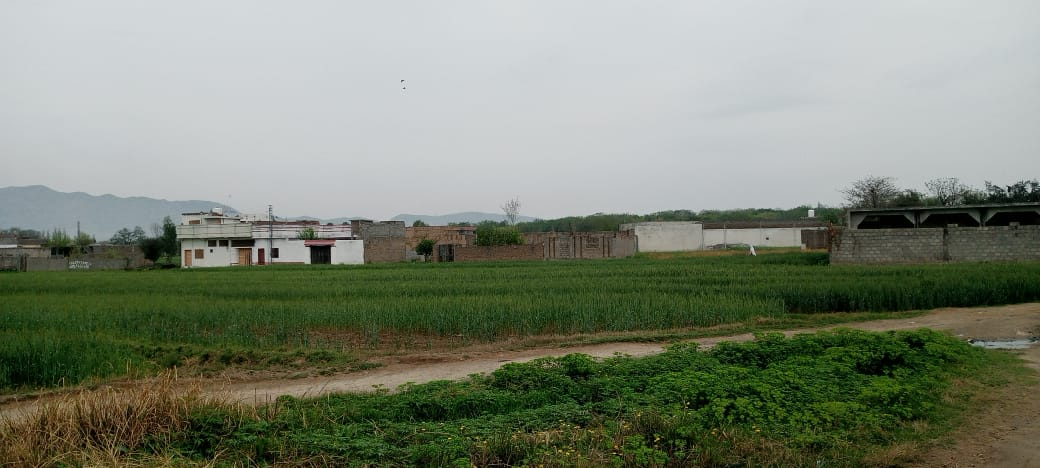
Road and houses in Bakka Jabbi village.

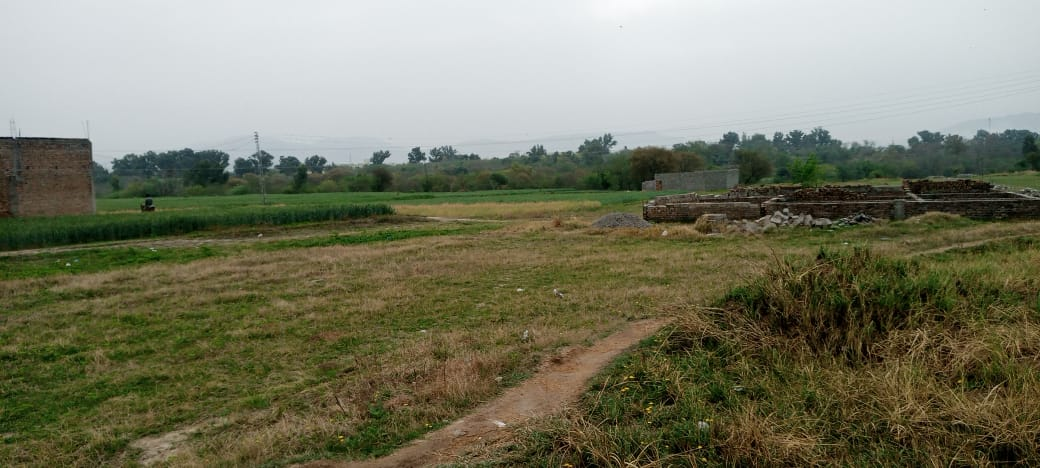
General view of Bakka Jabbi village area.

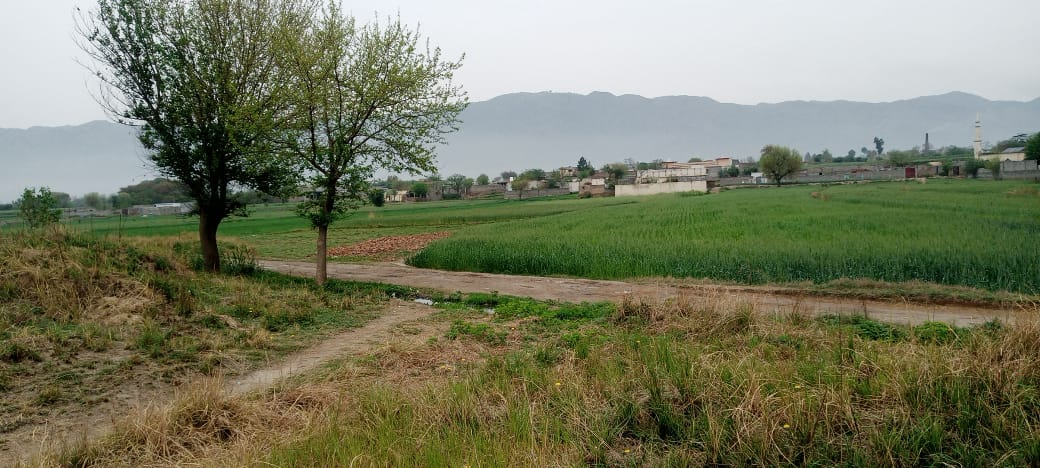
Village scenery in Bakka Jabbi, Haripur District.

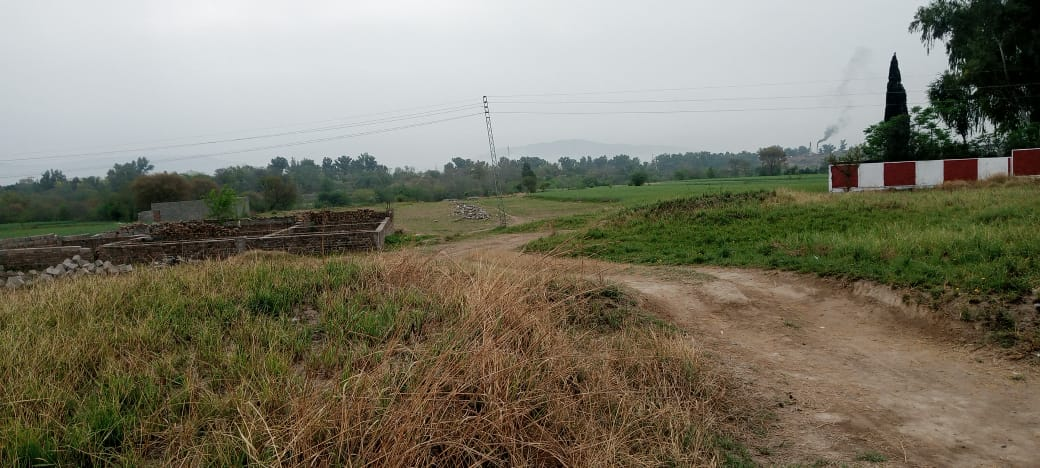
View of Bakka Jabbi village and surrounding terrain.
