= 2026 Bannu attacks =

Suicide attacks in Bannu, Pakistan

- Part of the insurgency in Khyber Pakhtunkhwa
- Location: Bannu, Khyber Pakhtunkhwa, Pakistan
- Date: 9 May 2026; 8:55 p.m. (PKT)
- Target: Police, Frontier Corps
- Attack type: Suicide bombing, shootout, drone attacks, ambush
- Weapons: Quadcopter drones, firearms, explosives
- Deaths: 21
- Injuries: 5
- Perpetrator: Ittehad-ul-Mujahideen Pakistan (claimed)
- No. of participants: 100+
- Defender: Bannu Regional Police

On 9 May 2026, several fighters detonated a car bomb near a security post before opening fire on police in Bannu, Khyber Pakhtunkhwa, Pakistan, killing at least 21 officers and injuring five others. An alliance of armed groups known as Ittehad-ul-Mujahideen Pakistan claimed responsibility for the attacks.

== Attacks ==
At 8:55 p.m. local time, a suicide bomber and multiple fighters detonated an explosives-laden vehicle near a security post, causing the post to collapse, destroying nearby vehicles and severely damaging nearby civilian areas. Several houses collapsed due to the force of the blast. The Bomb Disposal Squad estimated that between 1,200 and 1,500 kg of explosives were used in the attack. Shortly after the explosions, the attackers entered the premises and got into a shootout with the remaining police officers. Other law enforcement personnel were sent to help the police but were ambushed by the gunmen. Police sources said the attackers also used quadcopter drones. Bannu police official Muhammad Sajjad Khan said more than 100 militants were involved in the attacks. Ambulances from rescue agencies and civil hospitals were dispatched to the scene, with officials saying a state of emergency was declared in government hospitals in Bannu.

Rescuers conducted an hourslong search operation using heavy machinery to retrieve bodies from under the rubble.

== Victims ==
At least 21 police officers were killed and three others were injured. Two civilians also sustained injuries from the car bombing.

== Aftermath ==
Ittehad-ul-Mujahideen Pakistan, a newly formed self-proclaimed breakaway group from the Pakistani Taliban, claimed responsibility for the attack. The Ministry of Foreign Affairs said that the attack was carried out by terrorists from Afghanistan. A day after the attack, hundreds gathered at the police headquarters to attend the funerals of the deceased.

Days later on 12 May, an improvised explosive device detonated at a crowded market in Lakki Marwat, Khyber Pakhtunkhwa, killing at least 10 people and injuring around 30 others, including some seriously. No group claimed responsibility.
