= Bannu Cantonment =

Bannu Cantt بنو کېنټ
- Cantonment
- Bannu Cantonment
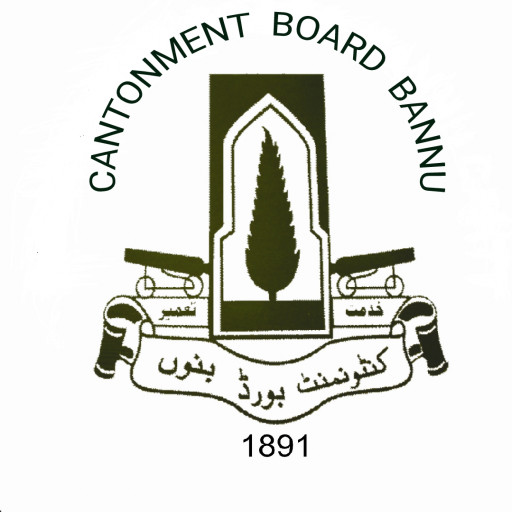

- Location within Pakistan Bannu Cantt (Pakistan)
- Coordinates: 32°59′54″N 70°36′04″E
- Country: Pakistan
- Province: Khyber Pakhtunkhwa
- District: Bannu
- Tehsil: Bannu

Population (2017)
  - Total: 8,320
- Time zone: UTC+5 (PST)

Bannu Cantonment is a cantonment adjacent to Bannu in Khyber Pakhtunkhwa, Pakistan. It is the only cantonment in Bannu District or the Bannu Division. It has a population of 8,320.

== History ==
=== Town of Bannu ===
The town of Bannu was founded in 1848 by Herbert Benjamin Edwardes, a lieutenant in the 1st Bengal European Fusiliers Regiment of the East India Company's private army. The fort, named Dhulipgarh (Dalipgarh) after the Maharajah of Lahore, was constructed at the same time. Originally named Dhulipnagar (Dalipnagar), the town was later renamed to Edwardesabad in 1869 before receiving its current name in 1903.

=== District Bannu ===
Bannu was recorded as a district in 1861 during the British Raj. The district is situated 190 km to the south of the provincial capital Peshawar and shares borders with North Waziristan, Karak, Lakki Marwat, and South Waziristan. The district covers an area of approximately 1,227 square kilometers and has a population of around 1.4 million people. Bannu is largely a rural area with agriculture being the main source of income. The district is known for its fertile agricultural land, historical and cultural sites, and as an important transportation hub in the region. The city of Bannu serves as the district's headquarters and is a commercial and administrative center.

=== Bannu Cantt ===
Before its declaration as a Cantonment, Bannu Fort was constructed on December 18, 1847. Named "Duleep Garh Fort" after the ruler of Punjab, it played a crucial role in the region's defense infrastructure. Later, the Cantonment was officially declared on December 17, 1891, with defined boundaries under Punjab Government Notification No. 1016, which were last extended and defined in October 1953 under Ministry of Defence Notification No. 1035/53.

The Cantonment's importance is evident from its first survey in 1929 by the Special Land Officer as part of the General Land Register (GLR) preparation under the Cantonment Land Administration Rules of 1925. The survey was last conducted in 1957-58 by the Survey of Pakistan Department, and the Register and plan prepared in conjunction with it provide a comprehensive description, classification, management, and ownership of each holding within the Cantonment limits.

Today, Bannu Cantonment spans over an area of 4.298 square kilometers (1.66 square miles or 1062.12 acres). Its well-defined boundaries and strategic location make it an essential component of Pakistan's defense infrastructure.
