= Bangi District =

- District
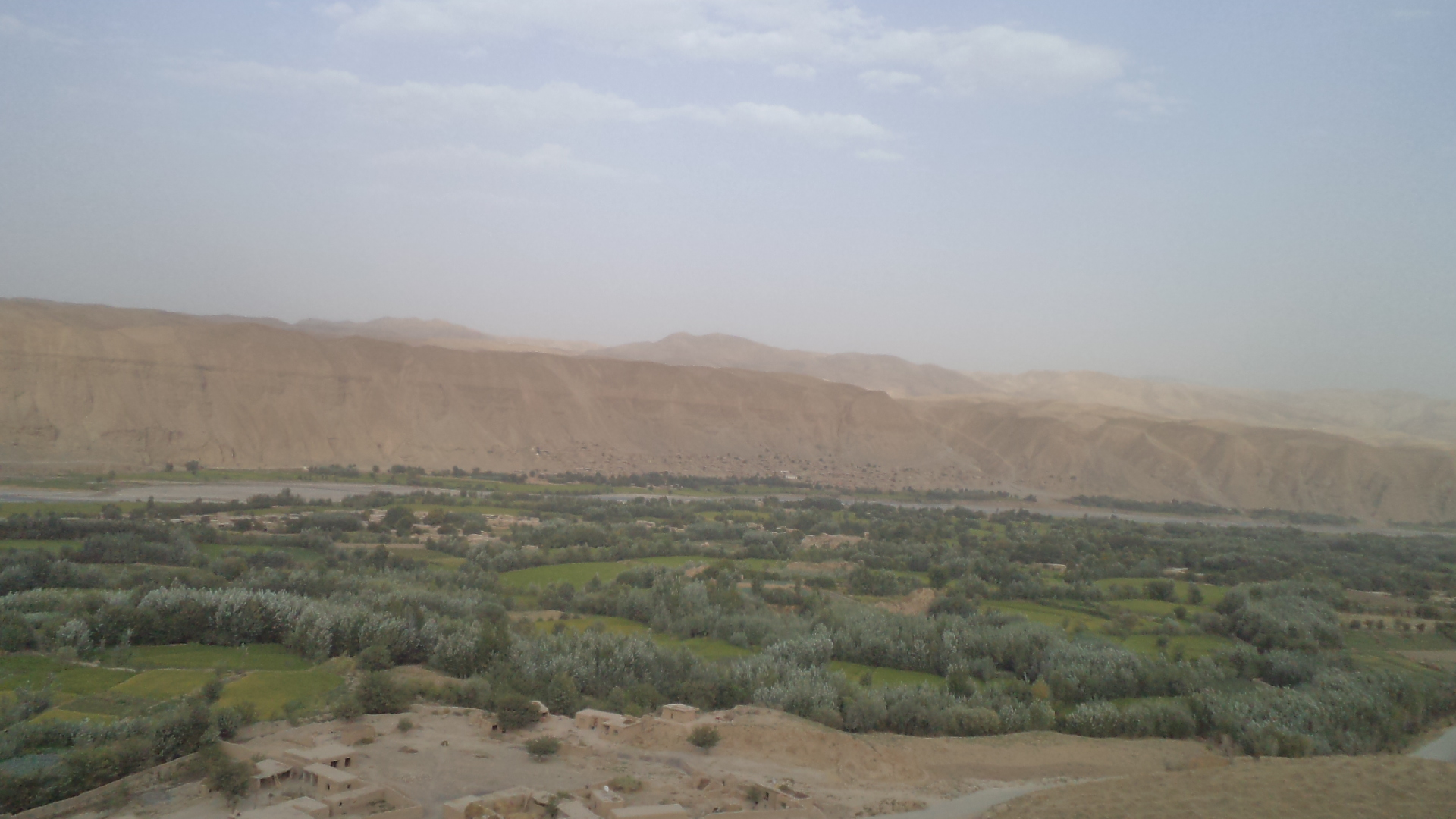
- Kadokhor and Garek villages

- Location of Bangi in Takhar Province
- Coordinates (district center): 36.66°N 69.34°E
- Country: Afghanistan
- Province: Takhār Province

Government
  - Governor: Faizurrahman Haidery

Area
  - Total: 566 km^{2} (219 sq mi)

Population (2003)
  - Total: 28,197
  - Estimate (2019): 39,042
  - Density: 49.8/km^{2} (129/sq mi)
- Time zone: UTC+4:30 (Afghanistan Standard Time)

Bangi District is a district of Takhar Province, Afghanistan.

== Geography ==
Bangi has an area of 566 square kilometers, comparatively equivalent to the area of Hitra Island. The district does have access to the highway linking Kunduz and Taloqan, which is a major road. Bangi has two tributaries of the Bangi River running through the district. One of them originates in Ishkamish District and the other originates in Khost wa Fereng District. They meet in Bangi District and run to the Khanabad River. There is one bridge over the Bangi river, which connects 15000 people with the district center. Before it was built, a portion of the district would be cut off from the rest for several months.

Bangi is bordered by Dasht-e-Archi to the north, Baharak to the northeast, Taluqan to the east, Chal to the southeast, Ishkamish to the south, and Khanabad to the west. Khanabad is located in Kunduz Province, with all other districts in Takhar Province. Bangi may also border Aqtash District, but Aqtash is a temporary district.

There are 59 villages in Bangi District.

== History ==
Bangi was first recognized in 1998 in the 329 Afghanistan district set, mapped by AIMS.

The district was considered to be an anti-Taliban bulwark in 2010 (in the Taliban insurgency) because of its large Uzbek population. The district governor was killed by the Taliban in 2015. Later in 2015, the Taliban claimed to have captured Bangi. Two years later, the Taliban claimed that the entire district was under full governmental control.

Bangi was considered to be under full government control in late 2017 by the BBC, but just a few months later SIGAR classified it as contested.

An irrigation canal that benefits over 7,500 people was built in 2019.

== Demographics ==
The district has a population of about 39,042 and a sex ratio of 101 males for every 100 females. Bangi has an Uzbek majority at 80% of the population, with Tajik, Hazara, and Pashtun minorities at ten, six and four percent of the total population. The median age is 17.2, which is one of the highest in the province. Only Warsaj District has a higher median age. About 50% of the population is working, and about 10% of the unemployed are seeking a job. The district is home to about 5,827 households, with an average size of 6.7 people.
