= Khash Darreh =

Khash Darreh is the name of two villages in Badakhshan Province in north-eastern Afghanistan.

== First village ==
Khash Darreh Khāsh Darreh
- Location in Afghanistan
- Coordinates: 36°54′15″N 70°45′25″E
- Country: Afghanistan
- Province: Badakhshan Province
- District: Khash
- Elevation: 6,686 ft (2,038 m)
- Time zone: + 4.30

This village lies in a ravine of the Kokcha River south of Bagh Mubarak, within the Khash District.

== Second village ==
Khash Darreh Khāsh Darreh
- Location in Afghanistan
- Coordinates: 36°32′26″N 70°40′09″E
- Country: Afghanistan
- Province: Badakhshan Province
- District: Yamgan
- Elevation: 6,686 ft (2,038 m)
- Time zone: + 4.30

The second village lies west of Khaneqa.
