= Chal District =

Chal چال
- District
- Location of Chal in Takhar Province
- Coordinates (district center): 36.528°N 69.539°E
- Country: Afghanistan
- Province: Takhār

Area
  - Total: 330.8 km^{2} (127.7 sq mi)

Population (2019)
  - Total: 31,337
  - Density: 94.73/km^{2} (245.4/sq mi)
- Time zone: UTC+4:30 (Afghanistan Standard Time)

Chal District (Dari: چال) is a district of Takhar Province, Afghanistan. It was considered to be largely under control of the Afghan government in 2018.

== Geography ==
Chal has an area of 331 kilometers, comparatively equivalent to the area of Komodo Island. The main river running through the district is the Chal River, which is a tributary of the Khanabad River.

Chal is bordered by Taluqan District to the north, Namak Ab District to the east, Guzargahi Nur District to the southeast, Ishkamish District to the south, and Bangi District to the west. Guzargahi is located in Baghlan Province, with all other districts in Takhar Province.

58 villages are located in Chal.

== History ==
Chal was created in 1975 by a cartographer in service of Mohammed Zahir Shah. The district was not mapped until 1998 by AIMS. Chal was captured by the Taliban on June 5 2001, and was subsequently retaken in the US invasion of Afghanistan.

From 2017 to 2020, Chal has been relatively peaceful in the Taliban insurgency. The BBC considered it to be under full governmental control in late 2017, which meant that it is attacked, at most, once in three months by the Taliban. SIGAR classified it as under Government of Afghanistan influence. About 3000 votes were cast in the district as part of the 2019 Afghan presidential election.

== Demographics ==
The district has a population of 31337 and a sex ratio of 24 males for every 20 females. The median age is 16.5 and about 40% of the population is working. 10% of the unemployed are seeking a job. The district is home to about 5,000 households, with an average size of about 6.3 people.

== See also ==
- Districts of Afghanistan
- Takhar Province
