= Baharak District, Takhar =

Baharak District
- District
- Location of the district in Takhar Province
- Coordinates: 36.805°N 69.41°E
- Country: Afghanistan
- Province: Takhār Province
- Established: 1992
- Functioning: 2002

Area
  - District: 231 km^{2} (89 sq mi)
- Elevation: 703 m (2,306 ft)

Population (2019)
  - District: 34,339
  - Density: 149/km^{2} (390/sq mi)
  - Urban: 0
  - Rural: 34,339

Ethnicity
  - Uzbek: 83%
  - Pashtun: 10%
  - Tajik: 5%
  - Hazara: 2%
- Time zone: UTC+4:30 (Afghanistan Standard Time)
- Post code: 3762

Baharak District is a district of Takhar Province, Afghanistan. The district was split-off from Taluqan District in 2005. Most people work in agriculture. The district has been the site of fighting between the Afghan Government and the Taliban; Baharak was considered to be contested in late 2018 and taken by the Taliban by August 2021.

== Geography ==
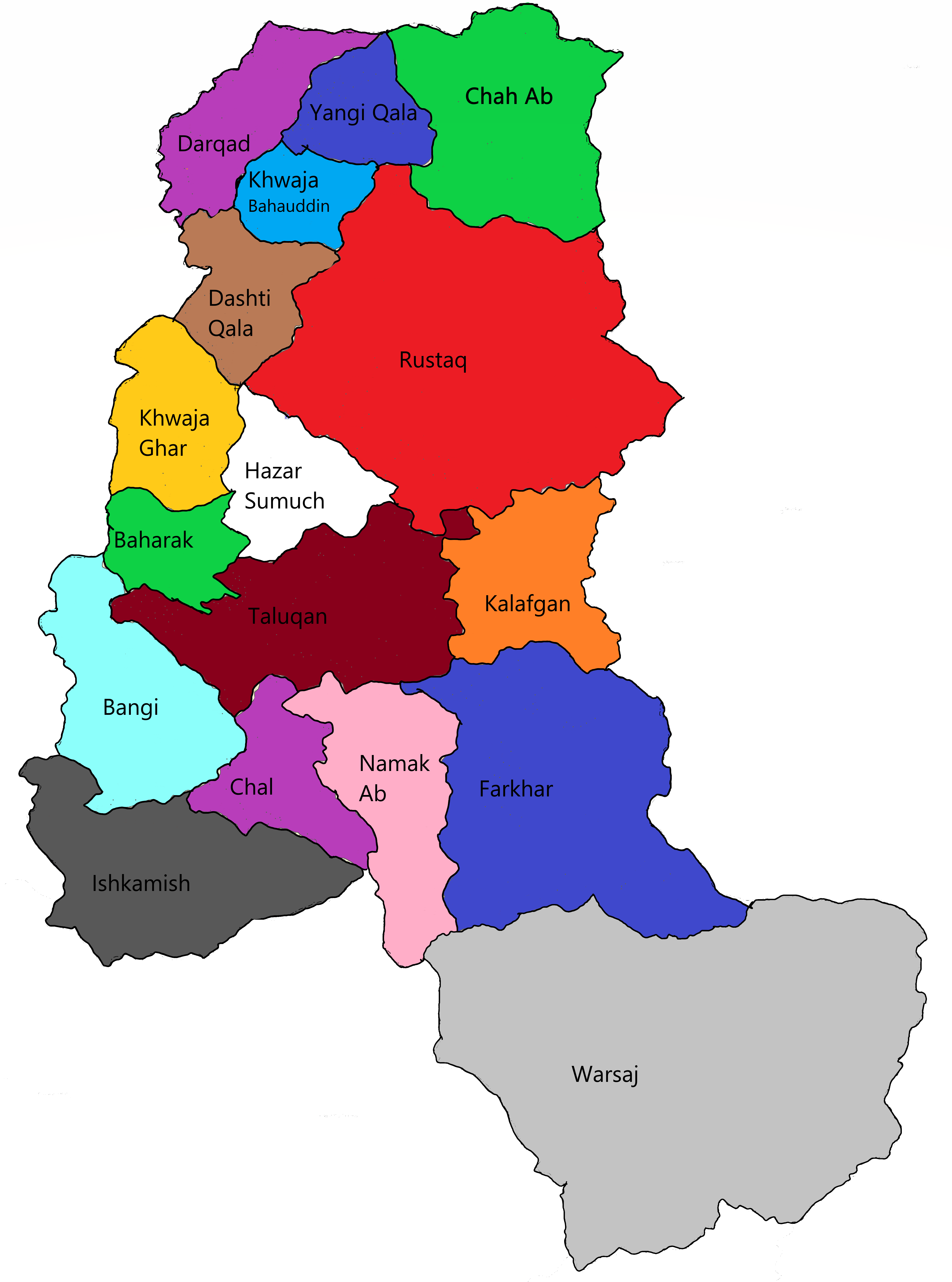
Map of Takhar Province

Baharak has an area of 231 square kilometers, comparatively equivalent to the area of São Vicente. There are secondary roads that connect the district to the provincial capital, Taloqan, and a smaller road connecting the district with Khwaja Ghar District. It is 15 kilometers away from Taloqan.

Baharak is bordered by Khwaja Ghar District to the north, Hazar Sumuch District to the east, Taluqan District to the south, and Bangi District with Dashti Archi District to the west. Dashti Archi is located in Kunduz Province, with all other districts located in Takhar Province. Baharak may also border Aqtash District, but Aqtash is a temporary district.

There is another Baharak District in Badakhshan Province.

== Demographics ==
Baharak has a population of 34339 and a sex ratio of 101 males for every 100 females. Most of the district is made up of Uzbeks, with Pashtun, Tajik, and Hazara minorities. The median age is 16.6 and 57.6% of the population is unemployed. 13% of the unemployed are seeking work. Baharak has about 4800 households, with an average size of 7.1 people.

== Economy ==
Close to half of employed people in Baharak work in agriculture, forestry, or fishing. Wheat and rice are the main crops, with barley, sorghum, sesame, corn, cotton, and melon also being grown. However, there is a lack of seeds, machinery, cold storages, and fertilizer. There used to be livestock, but much was lost because of war and drought.

Handicraft is another trade present in Baharak.

== Education and healthcare ==
Baharak has a 35% literacy rate among people ages 15–24. There is one madrasa, two high schools, and several primary schools in the district. The education situation has been improving- in 2002 there were only a handful of schools. However, there is a lack of teachers, supplies, and anti-government opposition to schools.

There are two health centers in Baharak: one by the district center and another by the village of Qara Kamar. There is also an ambulance to transport patients to Taloqan if needed. Tuberculosis and malaria remain an issue. Baharak suffers from a lack of medical knowledge, money, doctors, and medical equipment.
