= Darayem =

Darayem Darāyem Darāim
- Location in Afghanistan
- Coordinates: 36°52′0″N 70°23′0″E
- Country: Afghanistan
- Province: Badakhshan
- District: Darayim
- Elevation: 5,554 ft (1,693 m)
- Time zone: + 4.30

Darayem is a village in Badakhshan Province in north-eastern Afghanistan.

== Climate ==
Darayem features a warm-summer humid continental climate (Köppen climate classification: Dsb). Precipitation mostly falls in spring and winter.

Climate data for Darayem
Month	Jan	Feb	Mar	Apr	May	Jun	Jul	Aug	Sep	Oct	Nov	Dec	Year
Daily mean °C (°F)	−7.5 (18.5)	−6 (21)	−0.9 (30.4)	4.9 (40.8)	9.1 (48.4)	13.9 (57.0)	17.0 (62.6)	16.9 (62.4)	13.0 (55.4)	7.2 (45.0)	1.0 (33.8)	−4.7 (23.5)	5.3 (41.6)
Average precipitation mm (inches)	69.7 (2.74)	106.4 (4.19)	114.2 (4.50)	144.3 (5.68)	150.1 (5.91)	45.1 (1.78)	4.6 (0.18)	1.9 (0.07)	2.9 (0.11)	28.1 (1.11)	65.0 (2.56)	49.1 (1.93)	781.4 (30.76)
Average relative humidity (%)	63	71	63	55	50	37	30	30	31	39	52	55	48
Source 1: ClimateCharts
Source 2: World Weather Online (Precipitation & humidity)
