= Hazar Sumuch District =

- District
- Location of the district in Takhar Province
- Coordinates: 36.9°N 69.6°E
- Country: Afghanistan
- Province: Takhār Province

Area
  - District: 309 km^{2} (119 sq mi)

Population (2019)
  - District: 15,276
  - Urban: 0
  - Rural: 15,276
- Time zone: UTC+4:30 (Afghanistan Standard Time)
- Post code: 3761

Hazar Sumuch District is a district of Takhar Province, Afghanistan. The district was split-off from Taluqan District. Most people in the district work in agriculture. In late 2018, Hazar Sumuch was considered to be government influenced as opposed to the Taliban.

== Geography ==
Hazar Sumuch has an area of 309 square kilometers, comparatively equivalent to the area of Tobago. There is a secondary road connecting the district with Khwaja Ghar District and smaller roads connecting Hazar Sumuch to Rustaq District and Taloqan, the provincial capital. 28 villages are located in Hazar Sumuch.

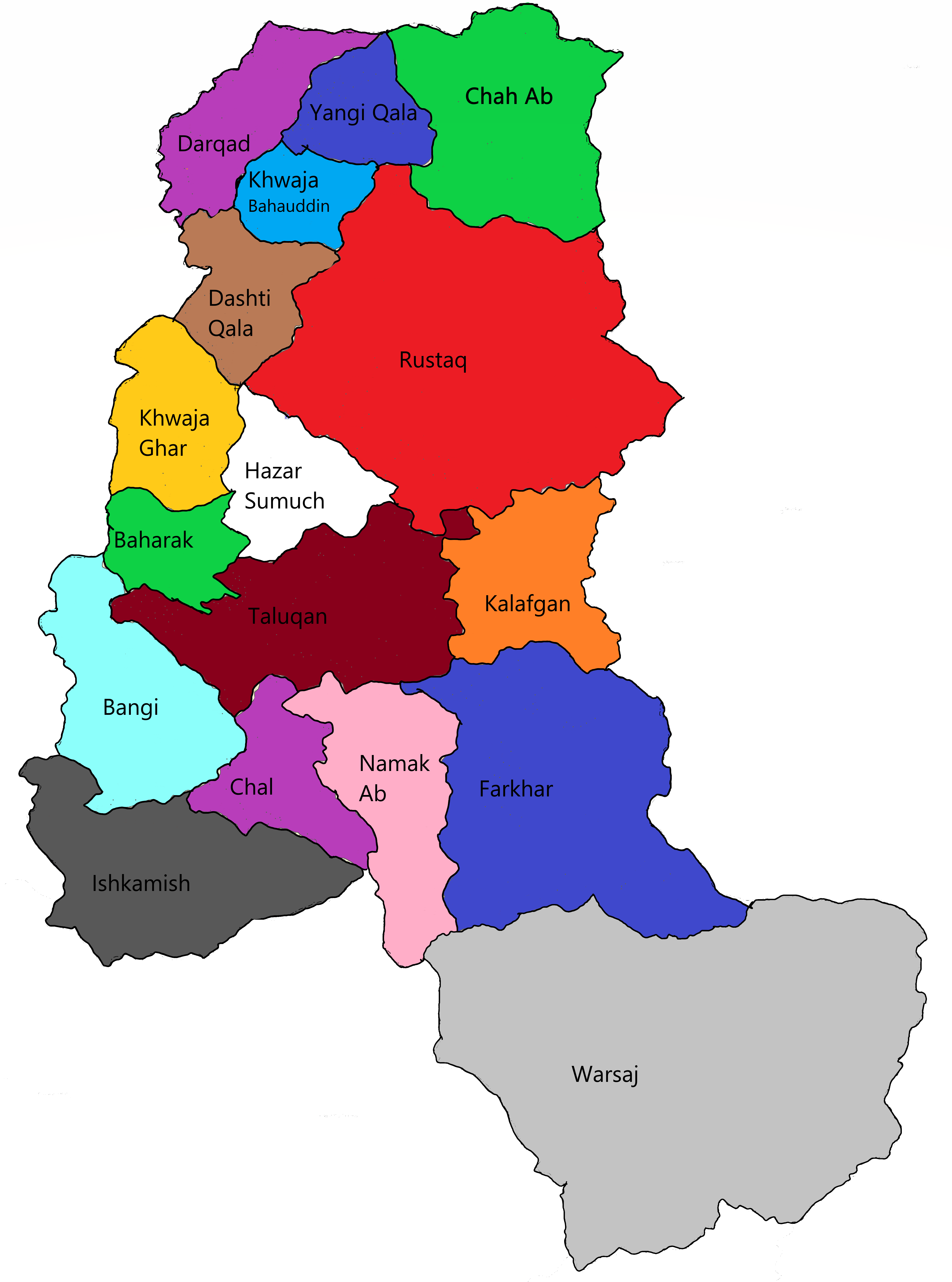
Map of Takhar Province

Hazar Sumuch is bordered by Dashti Qala District to the north, Rustaq District to the northeast, Taluqan District to the south, and Baharak District and Khwaja Ghar District to the west. Taluqan is the location of Taloqan. The Kokcha River forms Hazar Sumuch's northeast border.

== Demographics ==
Hazar Sumuch has a population of 15276 and a sex ratio of one female for every male. The average age is 17.4, and 43.3% of the population is employed. 14% of the unemployed are seeking work. Hazar Sumuch is home to about 2504 households, with an average size of 6.1 people.

== Economy ==
About two-thirds of the workforce works in agriculture or livestock. There are springs available, but there is a lack of seeds, improved machinery, animal care, and a market to sell goods. Handicrafts are also produced, but they are not produced systematically.

== Education and Healthcare ==
Hazar Sumuch has a literacy rate of 20% for people ages 19–24, which is among the worst in the district. The only other district in the province with a worse literacy rate is Namak Ab District. There are about 15 schools in the district, but they lack buildings, supplies, teachers, and funds.

Hazar Sumuch has one health center, located along the Kokcha river, with only a few doctors. Midwives are available.
