= Namak Ab District =

- District
- Location of Namak Ab in Takhar Province
- Coordinates (District Center): 36.62°N 69.62°E
- Country: Afghanistan
- Province: Takhār Province

Area
  - Total: 547.4 km^{2} (211.4 sq mi)

Population (2019)
  - Total: 13,579
  - Density: 24.81/km^{2} (64.25/sq mi)
- Time zone: UTC+4:30 (Afghanistan Standard Time)

Namak Ab District is a district of Takhar Province, Afghanistan. The district was split-off from Taluqan District. In late 2018, Namak Ab was considered to be government influenced, as opposed to the Taliban.

== Geography ==
Namak Ab has an area of 547.4 square kilometers, comparatively equivalent to the area of San Cristóbal Island. The only river in the district flows north until it reaches the Khanabad River. The district does not have good access to roads, with only 10% of the district having road access as of 2006.

Namak Ab is bordered by Taluqan District to the north, Farkhar District to the east, Warsaj District to the southeast, Farang Wa Gharu District to the south, Guzargahi Nur District to the southwest, and Chal District to the west. Farang Wa Gharu and Guzargahi Nur are located in Baghlan Province, with all other districts located in Takhar Province.

28 villages are located in Namak Ab.

== History ==
Namak Ab was created in June 2005 from Taluqan District. It was cleared of insurgents in December 2018.

The Taliban military chief for Namak Ab was captured in July 2020.

A district administration complex was built in 2020, costing about 24,000,000 Afghani (about 310,000 USD).

== Demographics ==
The district has a population of 13579, with a sex ratio of 53 males for every 50 females. The median age is 16.7, and about 50% of the population is employed. About 20% of the unemployed are seeking work. Namak Ab has roughly 2500 households, with an average size of 5.4 people. The average household size is the lowest out of all the Takhar districts.
