= Shuhada District =

District of Badakhshan Province, Afghanistan

Shuhada District Dari: ولسوالی شهدا Pashto: د شهدا ولسوالۍ
- District
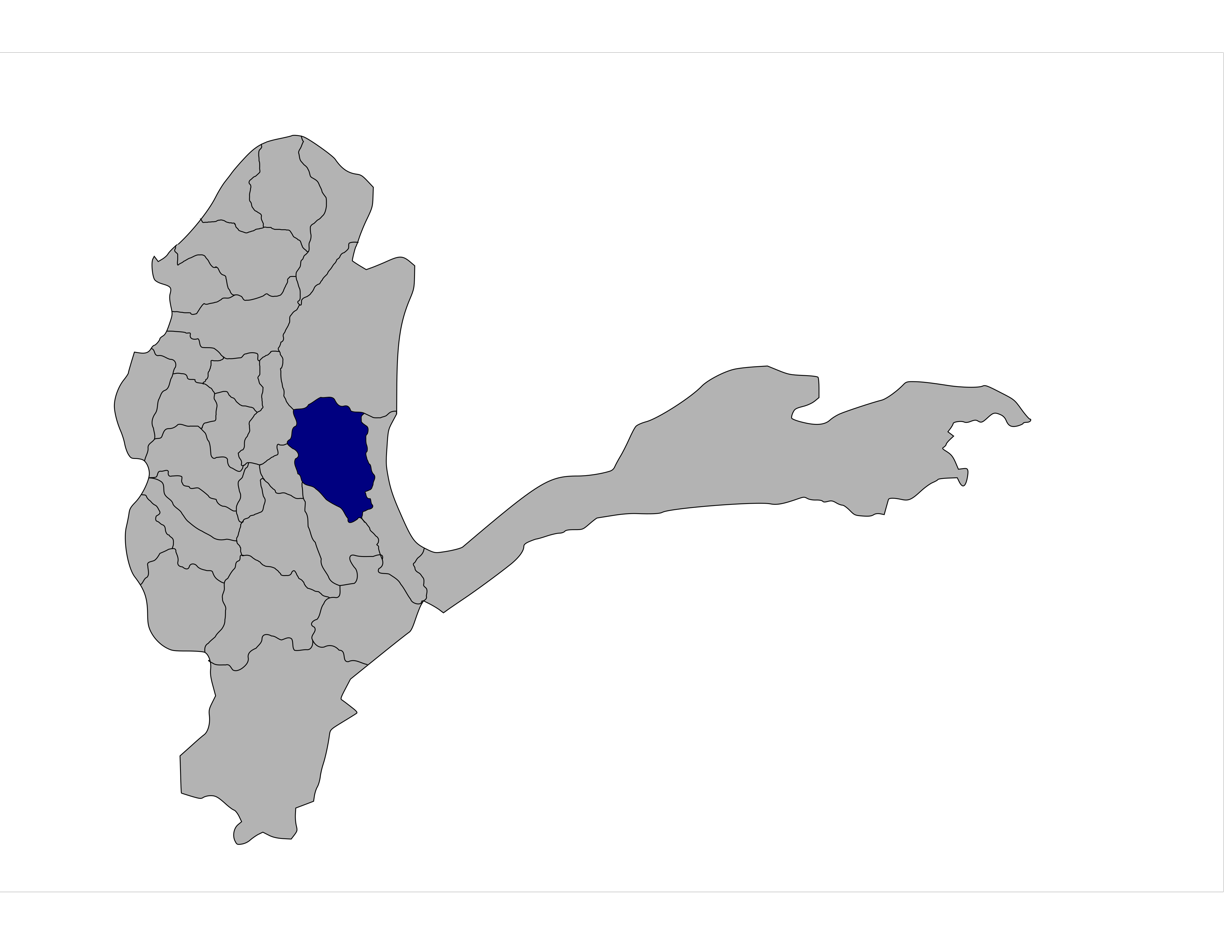
- Shuhada District was formed within Baharak District in 1995

- Location in Afghanistan
- Country: Afghanistan
- Province: Badakhshan

Government
  - Type: District
  - District Governor: Motiur Rahman

Population (2025)
  - Total: 42,570
- Time zone: UTC+04:30 (Afghanistan Time)

Shuhada District (Dari: شهداء; Pashto: د شهدا ولسوالۍ) is one of the 29 districts of Badakhshan Province in northeastern Afghanistan. It has an estimated population of 42,570 people. The district is located in the central part of the province, bordering Shighnan to the north and northeast; Ishkashim to the east; Wurduj to the south and southwest; Baharak to the west; and Arghanj Khwa to the northwest. Shuhada was officially separated from Baharak District in the late 20th century as part of administrative reforms.

== Geography ==
Shuhada is a mountainous district situated in the southern part of the Hindu Kush range. The region is characterized by high-altitude valleys, narrow river gorges, and scattered agricultural plains. The climate is continental, with cold winters and temperate summers. The district is largely rural and isolated, which contributes to its preservation of traditional lifestyles.

Shuhada is notable for its rich natural beauty and cultural heritage. Its remote valleys, alpine meadows, and flowing streams offer a scenic environment largely untouched by urban development. Traditional music, poetry, and oral history are important cultural elements in the district.

== Demographics ==
The population of Shuhada District is predominantly Tajiks, with Dari (Persian) being the main spoken language. Small minorities of Uzbeks and other ethnic groups also inhabit the region.

== Economy ==
The local economy is based on subsistence agriculture, animal husbandry, and small-scale trade. Residents cultivate wheat, barley, potatoes, and vegetables, while also raising livestock such as sheep, goats, and cattle. Due to the district’s remote location, many goods are still transported by animals such as donkeys or mules.

== Villages ==
The district comprises more than 120 villages. The main ones include:

1. Busht-e Vasat (بوشت وسط)
2. Busht-e Pāin (بوشت پایین)
3. Busht-e Bālā (بوشت بالا)
4. Dasht-e Shah Aref (دشت شاه عارف)
5. Chakaran (چاکران)
6. Dasht-e Mohammad Razaq (دشت محمد رازق)
7. Sangarian (سنگریان)
8. Sari Bagh-e Bālā (سری باغ بالا)
9. Deh-e Qaziyan (ده قاضیان)
10. Deh-e Pāin (ده پایین)
11. Sherkani (شیرکانی)
12. Bagh-e Nasheeb (باغ نشیب)
13. Ayvinak Kalan (ایوینک کلان)
14. Muslim Abad (مسلم آباد)
15. Sar Ask (سر اسک)
16. Saylāb (سیلاب)
17. Nowabad Ayvinak (نوآباد ایوینک)
18. Yababak (یبابک)
19. Deh-e Bālā-ye Ayvinak (ده بالای ایوینک)
20. Azryu (ازریو)
21. Saghi (سغی)
22. Ghozkani (غوزکانی)
23. Yāghan Joybar (یاغان جویبار)
24. Yarim Markaz (یاریم مرکز)
25. Joybar Markazi (جویبار مرکزی)
26. Nowabad Joybar (نوآباد جویبار)
27. Pitaw (پیتاو)
28. Yarim Bālā (یاریم بالا)
29. Nowabad Yarim (نوآباد یاریم)
30. Beykan (بیکان)
31. Joy-e Pariān (جوی پریان)
32. Nowabad Lab-e Darrah (نوآباد لب دره)
33. Kalānterān (کلانتران)
34. Dewāna (دیوانا)
35. Lab-e Darrah Kalān (لب دره کلان)
36. Wahdat Abad (وحدت آباد)
37. Arowan (اروان)
38. Walil (ولیل)
39. Madreseh (مدرسه)
40. Poshtān (پشتان)
41. Pālil (پالیل)
42. Raghankan (رغنکان)
43. Dasht-e Afghānha (دشت افغان‌ها)
44. Meydān Markazi (میدان مرکزی)
45. Payān-Deh (پایان‌ده)
46. Towhid Abad-e Meydān (توحید آباد میدان)
47. Osman Ghani (عثمان غنی)
48. Sarghoziyu (سرغوزیو)
49. Konāra Deh (کناره دیه)
50. Dargāb (درگاب)
51. Wala (ولا)
52. Sangāb (سنگاب)
53. Ghoziyu Bālā (غوزیو بالا)
54. Wanar (ونر)
55. Ghoziyu Pāin (غوزیو پایین)
56. Mazār (مزار)
57. Sar Simā (سر سیما)
58. Maghayeb Bālā (مغایب بالا)
59. Wajinj Bālā (وجینج بالا)
60. Wajinj Pāin (وجینج پایین)
61. Tarsgān (ترسگان)
62. Maghayeb Markazi (مغایب مرکزی)
63. Barchip-hā (برچیپ‌ها)
64. Qal‘a-e Warm (قلعه ورم)
65. Darrah Nāwak (دره ناوک)
66. Yājik (یاجک)
67. Miyandeh-e Parkhwāb (میانده پارخواب)
68. Ab Chashmeh (آبچشمه)
69. Arghdang (ارغدنگ)
70. Posht-e Khāna (پشت خانه)
71. Nowabad Sar-e Pol-e Zāgh (نوآباد سر پل زاغ)
72. Pas Kham (پسخم)
73. Sar-e Pol-e Zāgh (سر پل زاغ)
74. Sar-e Luleh (سر لوله)
75. Sarhangān (سرهنگان)
76. Livāni (لیوانی)
77. Mahmoodān (محمودان)
78. Motespān (متسپان)
79. Miyandeh Maghayeb (میانده مغایب)
80. Pejooj (پیجوج)
81. Deh-e Khāla (ده خاله)
82. Deh Darreh (ده دره)
83. Rezwān (رضوان)
84. Shakheyārak (شخیارک)
85. Sarkhān (سرخان)
86. Wāim (وایم)
87. Darrah Bālā-ye Bālā (دره بالای بالا)
88. Darrah Bālā-ye Pāin (دره بالای پایین)
89. Bostān (بوستان)
90. Ghazāliyu Bālā (غزالیو بالا)
91. Sari Tal (سری تل)
92. Darrah Qalāt (دره قلات)
93. Ghazāliyu Pāin (غزالیو پایین)
94. Yabab Kalān (یباب کلان)
95. Yabab Mahallah (یباب محله)
96. Yabab Maghayeb (یباب مغایب)
97. Nowabad Kowkān (نوآباد کوکان)
98. Yabab Kowkān (یباب کوکان)
99. Kurkho Darrah (کورخو دره)
100. Ghazmorgh (غزمرغ)
101. Yāferej Markazi (یافریج مرکزی)
102. Yāferej Jangalak (یافریج جنگلک)
103. Yāferej Vasat (یافریج وسط)
104. Yāferej Pāin (یافریج پایین)
105. Sochiyu (سوچیو)
106. Zir-e Yakhchiyu (زیر یخچیو)
107. Forojch (فُرُجچ)
108. Deh-e Bālā-ye Yakhchiyu (ده بالای یخچیو)
109. Yakhchiyu Kalān (یخچیو کلان)
110. Yāsich Kalān (یاسیچ کلان)
111. Towhid Abad-e Yāsich (توحید آباد یاسیچ)
112. Yakhshik (یخشیک)
113. Nowabad Tarwāzah (نوآباد تروازه)
114. Tagābah Yāsich (تگابه یاسیچ)
115. Dasht-e Sayyid Ahmad (دشت سید احمد)
116. Sari Dasht (سری دشت)
117. Zarghāb (زرغاب)
118. Tarwāzah Kalān (تروازه کلان)
119. Yāwach Khord (یاواچ خورد)
120. Yāwach Kalān (یاواچ کلان)
121. Deh-e Bālā-ye Tarwāzah (ده بالای تروازه)

== See also ==
- Districts of Afghanistan
