= Warsaj District =

- District
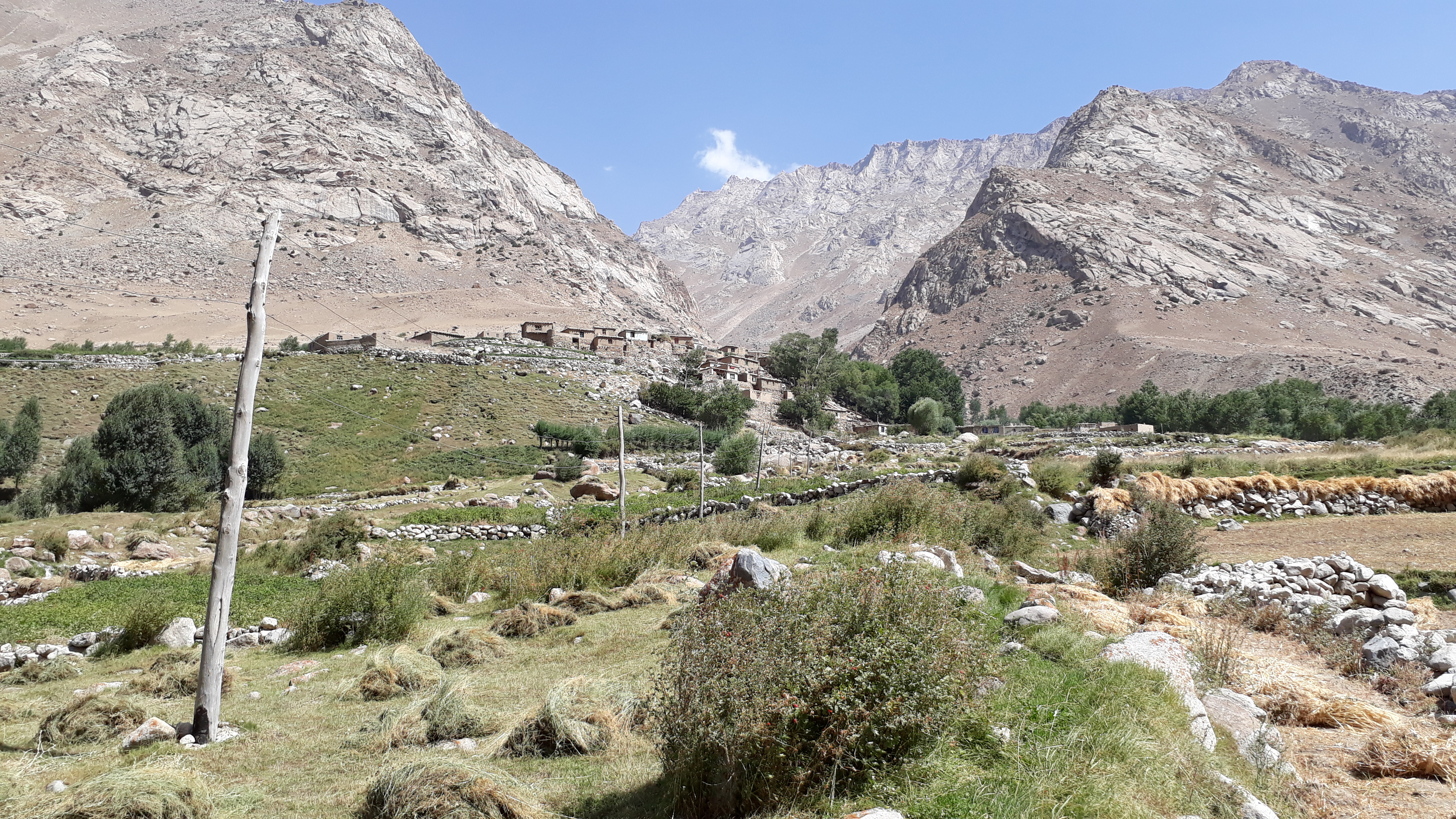
- Yangai village in Warsaj district

- Location of Warsaj in Takhar Province
- Coordinates (district center): 36.2°N 70°E
- Country: Afghanistan
- Province: Takhār Province
- District center: Warsaj

Area
  - Total: 2,705.3 km^{2} (1,044.5 sq mi)

Population (2003)
  - Total: 33,506
  - Estimate (2019): 42,175
  - Density: 12.385/km^{2} (32.078/sq mi)

Ethnicity
  - Tajik: 100%
- Time zone: UTC+4:30 (Afghanistan Standard Time)

Warsaj District is a district of Takhar Province, northern Afghanistan.

== Geography ==
Warsaj has an area of 2705.3 square kilometers, comparatively equivalent to the area of Unalaska Island. Warsaj District is located at the end of the Farkhar River valley and has historically only had roads to Farkhar and beyond to Taloqan, but has roads built recently connecting it to Fereng Wa Gharu and Khost wa Fereng. Most of the district is located within the Farkhar River basin and is the river's source.

Warsaj is bordered by Farkhar District and Tagab District to the north, Yamgan District to the northeast, Kuran wa Munjan District to the east, Paryan District to the south, Khost wa Fereng District and Farang Wa Gharu District to the west, and Namak Ab District to the northwest. Paryan is located in Panjshir Province. Khost wa Farang and Farang Wa Gharu are located in Baghlan Province. Namak Ab and Farkhar are located in Takhar Province, with all other districts it borders in Badakhshan Province.

== History ==
The district was first mapped in 1998 by AIMS. The district has been under control of the Afghan Government during the Taliban insurgency. The BBC classified Warsaj as under "full government control" in mid to late 2017, and SIGAR classified it as "government influenced" in December 2018. Around 10,000 votes have been cast in the district in both 2018 and 2019.

About 40 militants surrendered in Warsaj on 14 September 2019.

== Demographics ==
The district has a population of about 42,175 and a sex ratio of 97 males for every 100 females. 100% of Warsaj's population is Tajik. The median age is 17.5, which is the highest in the province. About 39% of the population is working, and about 12% of the unemployed are seeking a job. The district is home to about 6,800 households, with an average size of 6.2 people.
