= Khaneqa, Afghanistan =

Khaneqa Khāneqā
- Location in Afghanistan
- Coordinates: 36°32′46″N 70°41′22″E
- Country: Afghanistan
- Province: Badakhshan Province
- District: Yamgan
- Time zone: + 4.30

Khaneqa is a village in Badakhshan Province in north-eastern Afghanistan.
