= Dado, Afghanistan =

Dadokhel دادوخېل
- Location in Afghanistan
- Coordinates: 33°40′5″N 68°36′3″E
- Country: Afghanistan
- Province: Ghazni
- District: Zana Khan
- Elevation: 8,270 ft (2,520 m)
- Time zone: UTC+4:30

Dado (Pashto: دادو) is the district center of Zana Khan district, Afghanistan. It is located 30 km north-east of Ghazni on 33.6681°N 68.6008°E at 2,520 m altitude.

The town is located within the heartland of the Andar tribe of Ghilji Pashtuns.

== Climate ==
Dado has a humid continental climate (Köppen climate classification: Dsb) with warm, dry summers and cold, snowy winters.

Climate data for Dado, Ghazni Province
Month	Jan	Feb	Mar	Apr	May	Jun	Jul	Aug	Sep	Oct	Nov	Dec	Year
Daily mean °C (°F)	−7.7 (18.1)	−4.4 (24.1)	1.4 (34.5)	8.3 (46.9)	13.8 (56.8)	18.1 (64.6)	20.2 (68.4)	19.1 (66.4)	15.0 (59.0)	8.7 (47.7)	2.0 (35.6)	−3.7 (25.3)	7.6 (45.6)
Average precipitation mm (inches)	43.4 (1.71)	89.3 (3.52)	78.3 (3.08)	56.8 (2.24)	36.5 (1.44)	9.4 (0.37)	22.0 (0.87)	16.2 (0.64)	4.5 (0.18)	6.0 (0.24)	33.9 (1.33)	13.4 (0.53)	409.7 (16.15)
Average relative humidity (%)	56	65	52	36	28	21	24	26	20	23	38	40	36
Source 1: ClimateCharts
Source 2: World Weather Online (precipitation & humidity)

== See also ==
- Ghazni Province
