= Wurduj District =

Coordinates: 36°45′40.6″N 71°11′7.2″E

Wurduj وردوج
- District
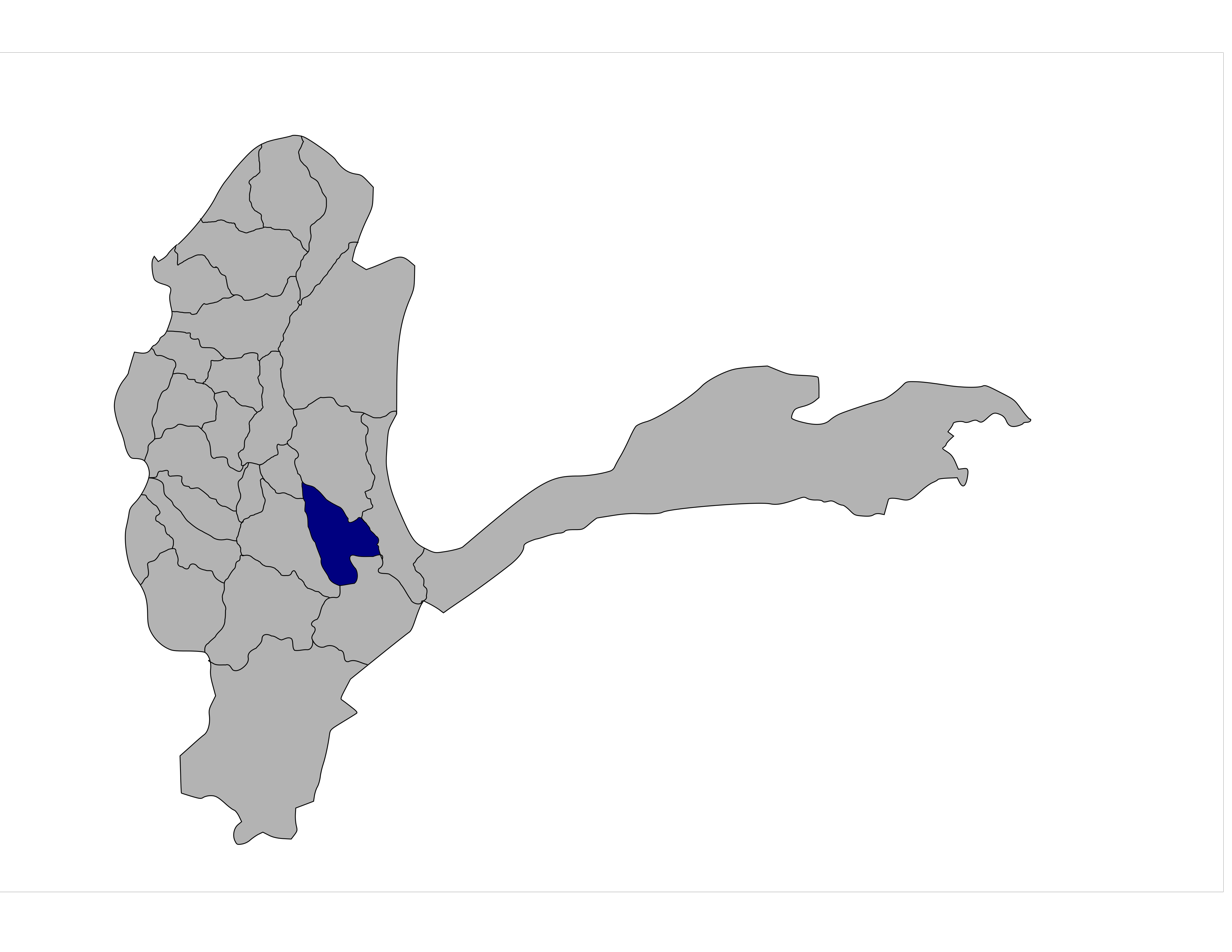
- Wurduj District was formed within Baharak District in 2005
- Country: Afghanistan
- Province: Badakhshan

Government
  - Type: District council
  - Governor: Dawlat Mohammad

Population
  - Estimate (2019): 24,285

Wurduj (Dari: وردوج) is one of the 28 districts of Badakhshan province in eastern Afghanistan. It was created in 2005 from part of Baharak District and is home to approximately 24,285 residents. Total area of the district is 929 square kilometers. 45 villages are located within its borders. Ethnic composition: 90% Tajik and 10% Uzbek.

As of January 2018 the district is almost entirely under the control of the Taliban. Training camps of the Turkistan Islamic Party are also based here.

== See also ==
- Baharak district
