= Tishkan District =

Place in Badakhshan, eastern Afghanistan

Tishkan تیشکان
- District
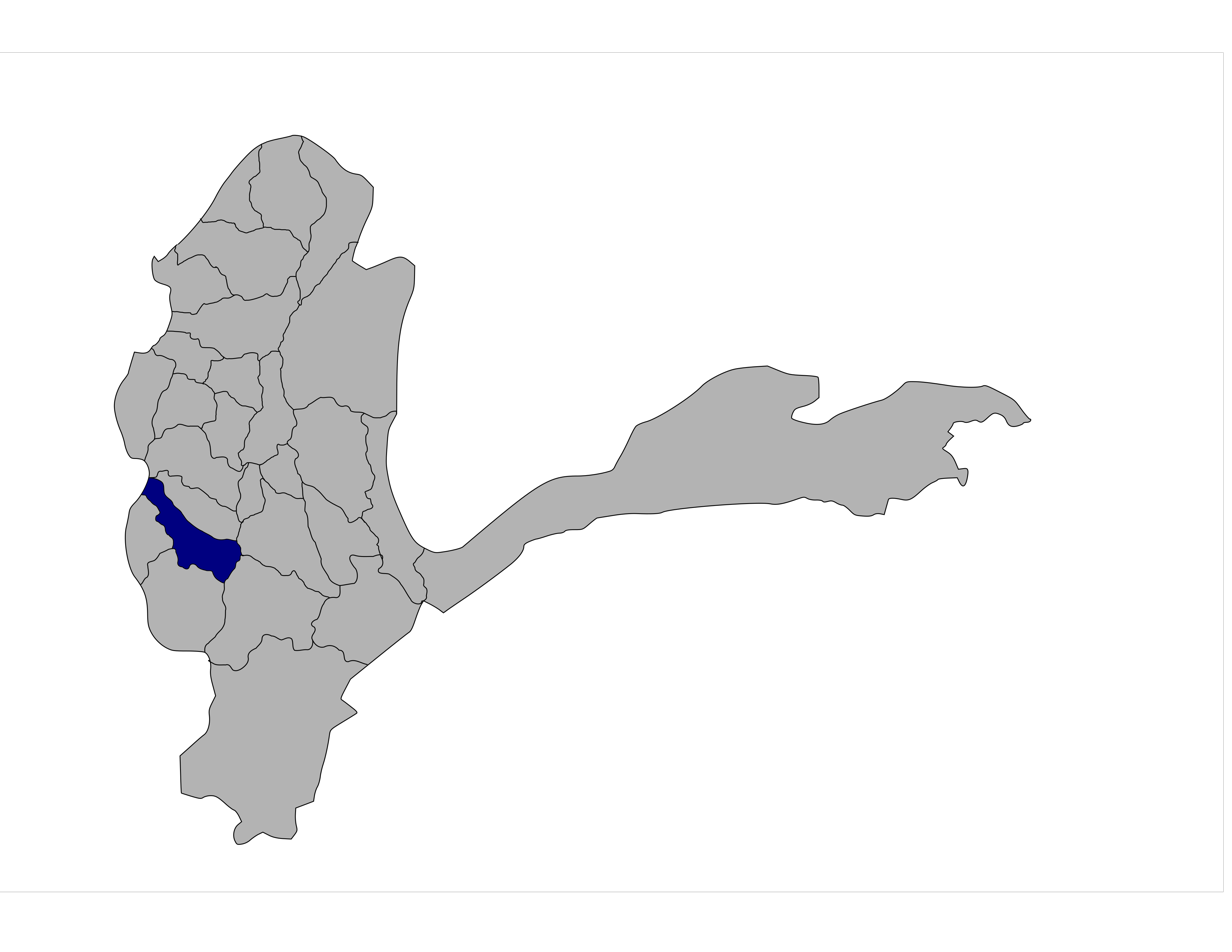
- Tishkim District was formed within Kishim District in 2005
- Country: Afghanistan
- Province: Badakhshan

Government
  - Type: District council

Population
  - Estimate (2019): 33,746

Tishkan (Dari: تیشکان) is one of the 29 districts of Badakhshan province in eastern Afghanistan. It was created in 2005 from part of Kishim District and is home to approximately 33,746 Population [2020]residents.

== See also ==
- Kishim District
