= Burka District =

Burka برکه
- District
- Location within Afghanistan
- Coordinates: 36°14′24″N 69°09′36″E
- Country: Afghanistan
- Province: Baghlan
- Control: Taliban

Burka (Dari: برکه) is in the northeastern district of Baghlan province. Its population is approximately 49,000. The capital is the city of Burka (alternate names: Borkeh, Barkah). It is in the foothills of the Hindu Kush mountains. The district is prone to earthquakes. On 5 May 2021 it was captured by Taliban forces.

== Demographics ==
The district dominated by Uzbeks at 60%, followed by Tajiks with 20%. Hazaras and Pashtuns share half-half their part in the district.
