= Zana Khan District =

Zana Khan زنه خان
- District
- Location within Afghanistan
- Coordinates: 33°41′N 68°40′E
- Country: Afghanistan
- Province: Ghazni
- Capital: Dado

Population (2002)
  - Total: 12,230

Zana Khan (Pashto: زنه خان) is a mountainous district in Ghazni province, Afghanistan with more than 12,000 people living there. The district center is Dado.

The district is within the heartland of the Andar tribe of Ghilji Pashtuns. Continuing drought is the main problem as in the whole province. It seriously affects agriculture, the main source of income. Health and education services need serious improvement.

Zana Khan district is currently under occupation of the Taliban and has been since August 2017.

== Agriculture ==
Land condition in 2002 found 20% of arable land in use.

- Main crops: wheat, alfalfa, maize and barley.
- Animal husbandry: sheep, goats and cows.

== See also ==
- Districts of Afghanistan
- Ghazni Province
