= Khash District =

Coordinates: 36°56′29″N 70°43′39″E

Khash خاش
- District
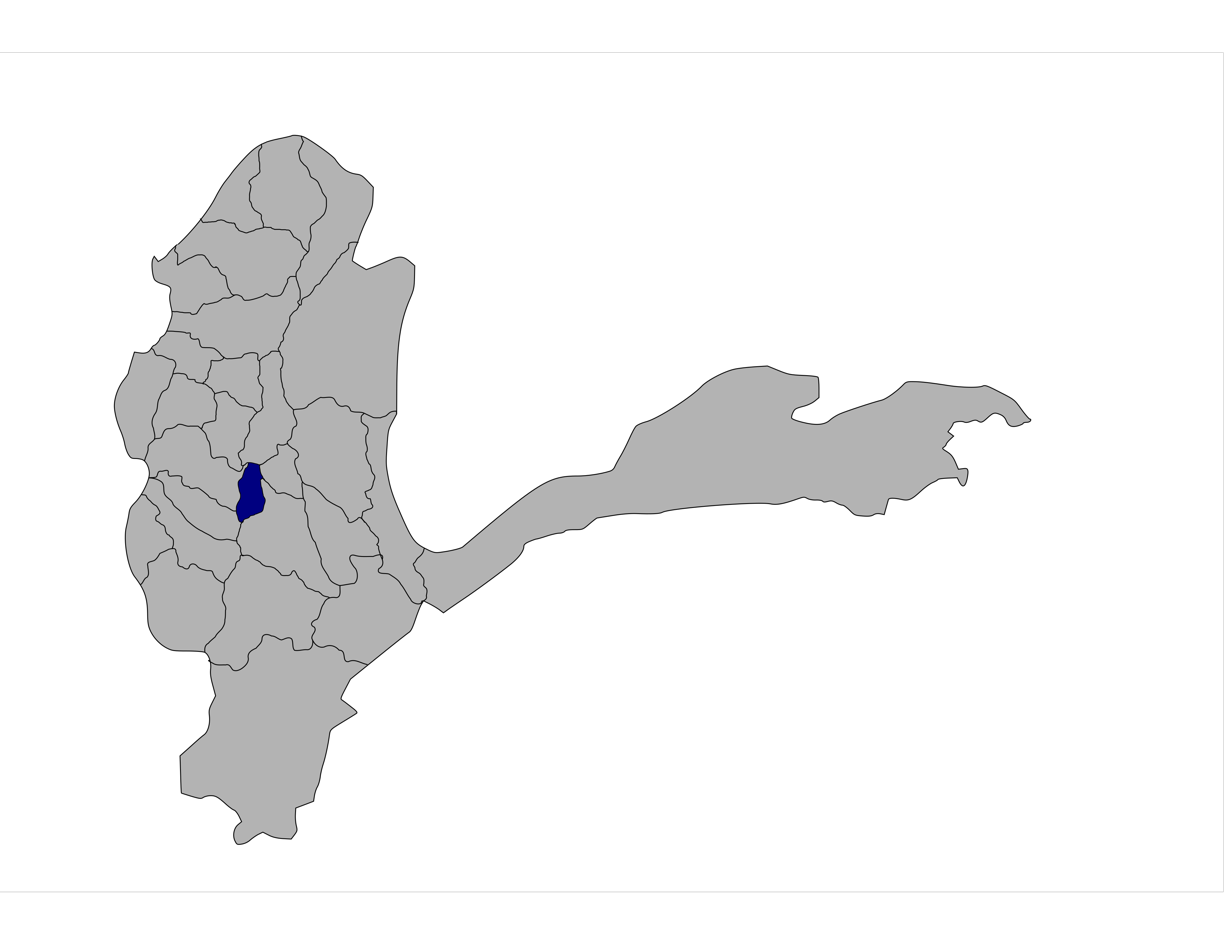
- Khash District was formed within Jurm District in 2005
- Country: Afghanistan
- Province: Badakhshan

Government
  - Type: District council

Population
  - Estimate: 48,000

Khash District (Dari: خاک) is one of the 28 districts of Badakhshan province, northeastern Afghanistan. It was created in 2005 from part of Jurm district and is home to approximately 43,306 residents, making it the third most populous district of the province.
