= Districts of Afghanistan =

Second-level administrative subdivision of Afghanistan

The districts of Afghanistan, known as wuleswali (Pashto: ولسوالۍ, wuləswāləi; Dari: ولسوالی, wuləswālī; Uzbek: اولسوالیک ulasvolik), are secondary-level administrative units, one level below provinces. The Afghan government issued its first district map in 1973. It recognized 325 districts, counting wuleswalis (districts), alaqadaries (sub-districts), and markaz-e-wulaiyat (provincial center districts). In the ensuing years, additional districts have been added through splits, and some eliminated through merges. In June 2005, the Afghan government issued a map of 398 districts. It was widely adopted by many information management systems, though usually with the addition of Sharak-e-Hayratan for 399 districts in total. It remains the de facto standard as of late 2018, despite a string of government announcements of the creation of new districts.

The latest announced set includes 421 districts. The country's Central Statistics Office (CSO) and the Independent Directorate of Local Governance (IDLG) came up with a joint, consolidated list of Afghan districts. It has handed this list over to the Independent Election Commission (IEC), which has used it in preparing the elections. The set contains 387 "districts" and 34 "provincial center districts" for 412 districts in total.

This article does not correspond with any particular district set; it lacks a number of districts currently recognized by the Afghan government, and some others that are popularly, but not officially, recognized.

== List of districts ==
District	Capital	Population (2020)	Area in km^{2}	Pop. density per km^{2}	Ethnic composition (Note: Note: "Predominantely" or "dominated" is interpreted as 99%, "majority" as 70%, "mixed" as 1/(number of ethnicities), "minority" as 30% and "few" or "some" as 1%.)
Badakhshan		1,054,087	44,836	24	85.4% Farsiwan (85.3% Tajiks, 0.1% Aimaqs), 7.2% Pamiris (incl. 1.5% Ishkashimi, 1.0% Munji, 3.0% Shughni, 1.1% Wakhi), 5.4% Turkmens, 1.5% Baloch, 0.5% Kyrgyz.
Arghanj Khwa		18,201	2,327	8	Majority Farsiwan (Tajiks, Aimaqs).
Argo		88,616	1,059	84	145 villages. Majority Tajik, minority Turkmens.
Baharak	Baharak	32,551	324	101	51 villages. 100% Tajik.
Darayim		69,618	585	119	101 villages. 100% Tajik.
Fayzabad	Fayzabad	77,154	497	155	175 villages. 100% Tajik.
Ishkashim	Ishkashim	15,677	1,415	11	43 villages. Predominantly Pamiris (Ishkashimi), few Tajik.
Jurm	Jorm	42,671	1225	35	75 villages. 100% Tajik
Khash		43,046	243	177	21 villages. Majority Turkmen, minority Tajik
Khwahan	Khwahan	18,734	698	27	46 villages. Predominantly Tajik.
Kishim	Mashhad	91,407	767	119	100 villages. 100% Tajik
Kohistan		18,733	494	38	13 villages. 100% Tajik
Kuf Ab	Qal`eh-ye Kuf	25,243	1,439	18	Predominantly Tajik, some Aimaq.
Keran wa Menjan	Keran wa Menjan	10,761	4,712	2	42 villages. Predominantly Pamiri (Munji), few Tajiks.
Maimay (Darwaz-e Payin)	Jamarj-e Bala	29,893	1,217	25	Predominantly Tajik, some Aimaq.
Nusay (Darwaz-e Bala)	Nusay	26,173	1,589	16	16 villages. Tajik.
Raghistan	Ziraki	44,773	1,321	34	25 villages. 100% Tajik.
Shahri Buzurg	Shahri Buzurg	59,123	942	63	74 villages. 100% Tajik.
Sheghnan	Shughnan	31,487	1,968	16	28 villages. Predominantly Pamiri (Shughni).
Shekay	Jarf	29,760	635	47	38 villages. Tajik, etc.
Shuhada		39,061	1,244	31	62 villages. Predominantly Farsiwan (Tajik, Aimaq), few Pamiri (Ishkashimi).
Tagab		31,753	1,401	23	Mixed Tajik and Baloch.
Tishkan		33,746	821	41	57 villages. 100% Tajik.
Wakhan	Khandud	16,873	10,930	2	110 villages. Majority Pamiri (Wakhi), minority Kyrgyz.
Warduj		24,712	684	36	45 villages. 100% Tajik.
Yaftali Sufla		59,654	606	98	93 villages. 100% Tajik.
Yamgan		29,096	1,744	17	39 villages. 100% Tajik
Yawan		36,669	431	85	100% Tajik.
Zebak	Zebak	8,902	2,057	4	62 villages. Majority Pamiri, minority Tajik.
Badghis		549,583	20,794	26	51.7% Pashtuns, 44.9% Farsiwan (44.7% Tajiks, 0.2% Aimaqs), 0.5% Balochi, 1.5% Turkmens, 1.4% Uzbeks.
Ab Kamari		83,169	2,311	36	80% Tajiks, 20% Pashtuns.
Ghormach		62,311	1,782	35	97% Pashtuns, 2% Tajik Aimaqs, 1% Baloch.
Jawand		89,148	6,105	15	Mixed Pashtuns and Tajiks.
Muqur		26,838	620	43	Mixed Pashtuns and Tajiks.
Bala Murghab		109,874	4,237	26	85.6% Pashtuns, 7% Tajiks, 7% Turkmens, 0.3% Uzbeks.
Qadis		102,833	3,391	30	Mixed Pashtuns and Tajiks.
Qala i Naw		75,410	841	90	82% Tajiks, 10% Uzbeks, 5% Pashtuns, 3% Baloch, 1% Turkmen.
Baghlan		1,014,634	18,255	56	52.8% Tajiks, 25.5% Pashtuns, 13.0% Hazaras, 8.2% Uzbeks, 0.2% others.
Andarab		28,830	807	36	Tajik
Baghlani Jadid	Baghlan	198,382	1,676	118	Pashtun 70%, Tajik 20%, Uzbek 10%
Burka		59,521	933	64	60% Uzbek, 20% Tajik, 10% Hazara, 10% Pashtun
Dahana-I-Ghuri		66,618	1,333	50	80% Pashtun, 10% Hazara, 10% Uzbek
Dih Salah		36,137	633	57	Created in 2005 within Andarab District. Tajik dominated
Dushi		75,597	2,356	32	60% Hazara, 39% Tajik
Farang Wa Gharu		18,733	244	77	Tajik dominated, created in 2005 within Khost Wa Fereng District
Guzargahi Nur		11,426	425	27	Tajik dominated, created in 2005 within Khost Wa Fereng District
Khinjan		34,411	1,017	34	85% Tajik, 5% Hazara, 5% Pashtun, and 5% other
Khost Wa Fereng		71,345	1,898	38	Tajik dominated, sub-divided in 2005
Khwaja Hijran		26,971	659	41	Tajik dominated, created in 2005 within Andarab District
Nahrin		78,438	998	79	60% Tajik, 35% Pashtun 35%, 5% Uzbek
Puli Hisar		31,222	905	35	Tajik dominated, created in 2005 within Andarab District
Puli Khumri	Puli Khumri	242,859	664	366	Tajik 60%, Hazara 20%, Pashtun 13%, Uzbek 7%
Tala wa Barfak		34,144	2,525	14	Hazara 70%, Tajik 30%
Balkh		1,509,183	16,186	93	43.5% Farsiwan (Tajiks, Persianized Arabs, Aimaqs), 27.0% Turkic (17.4% Uzbeks, 1.7% Kyrgyz, 7.4% Turkmens, 0.5% Kazakhs), 18.3% Pashtuns (Kandahari, Balochi, Kochi), 11.9% Hazaras.
Balkh		136,097	536	254	Predominantly Farsiwans, few Uzbeks and Hazaras.
Charbolak		91,539	607	151	Majority Pashtuns, minority Farsiwans (Tajiks, Arabs).
Charkint		50,220	1,222	41	Majority Uzbeks, minority Kazakhs and Pashtuns, some Farsiwans.
Chimtal		103,630	1,917	54	Majority Uzbeks, minority Farsiwans, Pashtuns and Hazaras.
Dawlatabad		119,083	1,804	66	Majority Farsiwans, minority Uzbeks, Hazaras, Turkmens, Pashtuns.
Dihdadi		76,261	274	278	Mixed Kyrgyz, Farsiwans and Hazaras.
Kaldar		22,586	803	28	Predominantly Uzbeks.
Khulm	Tashqurghan	83,032	3,204	26	91 villages. Mix of Uzbeks, Farsiwans (Arabs, Aimaq), Pashtuns, Hazaras. Used to be part of Samangan Province.
Kishindih		55,003	1,083	51	Majority Hazaras, minority Pashtuns and Uzbeks.
Marmul		12,888	375	34	Majority Farsiwans, minority Uzbeks, few Kyrgyz.
	Mazar-e-Sharif	484,492	67	7,218	50% Farsiwans, 27% Pashtuns, 12% Turkmens, 11% Uzbeks.
Nahri Shahi		50,752	1,409	36	Predominantly Farsiwans, some Uzbeks and Hazaras.
Sholgara		129,271	1,755	74	40% Farsiwans (Tajiks, Arabs), 20% Pashtuns (Kandahari, Baloch, Kuchi), 20% Hazaras, 20% Uzbeks.
Shortepa		44,773	1,563	29	Predominantely Turkmens, few Uzbeks.
Zari		49,556	869	57	Predominantly Hazaras. Used to be part of Kishindih District.
Bamyan		495,557	18,029	27	83.9% Hazaras (71.1% Shiites, 10.8% Sayyids, 1.1% Ismailis, 0.9% Sunni Tatars), 16.1% Farsiwan (15.9% Tajiks, 0.2% Qizilbash), 0.3% Pashtuns.
Bamyan	Bamyan	94,855	1,798	53	94% Hazaras (82% Shiites, 12% Sayyids), 5% Tajiks, 1% Qizilbash, <1% Pashtuns.
Kahmard	Kahmard	41,053	1,389	30	85% Tajiks, 14% Hazaras (8% Shiites, 6% Sunni Tatars), 1% Pashtuns. Used to belong to Baghlan Province.
Panjab	Panjab	77,058	1,961	39	100% Hazaras.
Sayghan	Sayghan	27,103	1,729	16	Used to be part of Kahmard District.
Shibar	Shibar	33,348	1,372	24	53% Hazaras (35% Shiites, 17% Ismailis, 1% Sayyids), 47% Tajiks.
Waras	Waras	123,293	2,975	41	99% Hazaras, 1% Sayyids.
Yakawlang	Yakawlang	68,821	4,579	15	>99% Hazaras (59% Shiites, 41% Sayyids), <1% Tajiks.
Yakawlang 2		30,026	2,223	14	Used to be part of Yakawlang District.
Daykundi		516,504	17,501	30	96.4% Hazaras (92.8% Shiites, 3.6% Sayyids), 3.6% Balochi.
Ishtarlay		61,174	1,607	38	343 villages. Hazaras
Kijran		37,062	882	42	Baloch, Sadat
Khedir		53,434	1,744	31	294 villages. Hazaras
Kitti		56,436	1,004	56	196 villages. Hazaras
Miramor		86,024	2,208	39	326 villages. Hazaras
Nili	Nili	42,832	591	72	165 villages. Hazaras
Sangi Takht		59,043	1,711	35	Hazaras
Shahristan		80,740	1,916	42	290 villages. Hazaras
Farah		563,026	49,339	11	73.8% Pashtuns, 24.4% Tajiks, 1.8% others.
Anar Dara		31,487	1,703	18	70% Tajiks, 30% Pashtuns.
Bakwa		40,124	2,324	17	100% Pashtuns.
Bala Buluk		80,778	5,525	15	95% Pashtuns, 5% Tajiks.
Farah	Farah	128,047	3,588	36	85% Pashtuns, 10% Tajiks, 5% others.
Gulistan		49,025	6,576	7	80% Pashtuns, 20% Tajiks.
Khaki Safed		34,277	1,938	18	99% Pashtuns, 1% Tajiks.
Lash Wa Juwayn		31,621	5,323	6	50% Pashtuns, 50% Tajiks.
Pur Chaman		60,450	6,188	10	95% Tajiks, 5% Pashtuns.
Pusht Rod		45,969	327	141	99% Pashtuns, 1% Tajiks.
Qala-I-Kah/ Pusht-e-Koh		34,809	4,485	8	70% Pashtuns, 30% Tajiks.
Shib Koh		26,439	2,928	9	70% Pashtuns, 15% Tajiks, 15% others.
Faryab		1,109,223	20,798	53	58.0% Uzbeks, 21.0% Tajiks, 13.0% Turkmens, 6.0% Pashtuns, 1.5% Hazaras, 0.4% others.
Almar		79,449	2,034	39	86 villages. 60% Uzbek, 30% Turkmen, 10% Tajik.
Andkhoy	Andkhoy	46,789	378	124	81 villages. 58% Turkmen, 40% Uzbek, 2% Pashtun.
Bilchiragh		58,989	1,098	54	44 villages. 55% Uzbek, 40% Tajik, 5% Turkmen.
Dawlat Abad		55,186	2,657	21	56 villages. 40% Pashtun, 30% Uzbek, 20% Turkmen, 10% Tajik.
Gurziwan		85,694	1,844	46	54 villages. 40% Uzbek, 30% Tajik, 20% Turkmen, 5% Pashtun, 5% others.
Khani Char Bagh		26,173	939	28	16 villages. 60% Uzbek and 40% Turkmen.
Khwaja Sabz Posh		57,395	610	94	85 villages. 80% Tajik, 19% Hazara, 1% Pashtun.
Kohistan		61,646	2,402	26	133 villages. 85% Uzbeks, 10% Tajiks, 5% Hazara
Maymana	Maymana	95,971	90	1,061	75% Uzbeks, 20% Tajiks, 3% Hazaras, 2% Pashtun.
Pashtun Kot		213,371	2,807	76	331 villages. 65% Uzbek, 30% Tajik, 5% Pashtun.
Qaramqol		22,187	1,079	21	19 villages / 73 Semi-villages. 60% Turkmen, 35% Uzbek, 5% Pashtun.
Qaysar		161,025	2,257	71	190 villages. 70% Uzbeks, 16% Tajiks, 10% Pashtun, 4% Turkmen.
Qurghan		53,277	806	66	13 villages. 60% Turkmen, 40% Uzbek.
Shirin Tagab		92,071	1,809	51	116 villages. 80% Uzbek, 10% Pashtun, 10% Tajik.
Ghazni		1,362,504	22,461	61	48.1% Pashtuns, 43.8% Hazaras, 7.4% Tajiks, 0.7% Hindus.
Ab Band	Haji Khel	31,089	991	31	>99% Pashtun, <1% Tajik.
Ajristan	Sangar	32,550	1,461	22	97% Pashtun, 3% Hazara.
Andar	Miray	140,963	681	207	100% Pashtun.
Deh Yak	Ramak	55,269	709	78	89% Hazara, 11% Pashtun.
Gelan	Janda	65,366	1,116	59	100% Pashtun.
Ghazni	Ghazni	186,706	380	491	50% Tajik, 25% Pashtun, 20% Hazara, 5% Hindus.
Giro	Pana	41,319	878	47	100% Pashtun.
Jaghori	Sang-e-Masha	199,553	1,965	102	100% Hazara.
Jaghatū	Gulbawri	35,871	696	52	73% Hazara, 27% Pashtun.
Khogyani	Khogyani	22,719	147	155	>99% Pashtun, <1% Hazara and Tajik.
Khwaja Umari	Kwaja Umari	21,390	176	122	45% Hazara, 35% Tajik, 20% Pashtun.
Malistan	Mir Adina	92,736	1,978	47	100% Hazara.
Muqur	Muqur	56,863	931	61	99% Pashtun, 1% Tajik and Hazara.
Nawa	Nawa	33,613	1,753	19	100% Pashtun.
Nawur	Du Abi	106,952	5,097	21	100% Hazara.
Qarabagh	Qarabagh	161,424	1,690	96	55% Pashtun, 45% Hazara.
Rashidan	Rashidan	20,328	98	208	96% Pashtun, 4% Hazara.
Waghaz	Waghaz	43,578	512	85	Predominantly Pashtun.
Zana Khan	Dado	14,215	284	50	100% Pashtun.
Ghor		764,472	36,657	21	71.0% Farsiwan (59.2% Aimaqs, 11.8% Tajiks), 26.5% Hazaras, 2.0% Pashtuns, 0.4% Uzbeks.
Chaghcharan		132,537	6,870	19	96% Tajik Aimaqs, 2% Pashtuns, 2% Hazaras
Charsada		30,956	1,485	21	60% Tajik Aimaqs, 30% Hazaras, 10% Uzbeks
Dawlat Yar		36,934	1,686	22	Predominantly Hazaras, few Tajik Aimaqs
Du Layna		40,788	3,246	13	Predominantly Tajik Aimaqs
Lal wa Sarjangal		126,615	3,634	35	100% Hazaras
Marghab		21,051	2,930	7	Predominantly Hazaras
Pasaband		107,217	5,073	21	84% Tajiks, 11% Pashtuns, 5% Hazaras
Saghar		39,193	2,404	16	Predominantly Tajik Aimaqs, few Pashtuns
Shahrak		67,625	4,600	15	100% Tajik Aimaqs
Taywara	Qala-e-ghore	103,364	4,030	26	Predominantly Tajik Aimaq, few Hazaras
Tulak		58,192	2,908	20	Predominantly Tajik Aimaq, few Pashtuns and Uzbeks
Helmand		1,446,230	58,305	25	88.1% Pashtuns, 5.4% Balochi, 3.9% Hazaras, 0.9% Hindus, 0.9% Uzbeks, 0.8% Farsiwans (Tajiks), <0.1% Sikhs.
Baghran		129,745	3,858	34	38 villages. 90% Pashtun, 10% Hazara.
Dishu		30,296	11,680	2	80% Pashtun, 20% Baloch
Garmsir		119,237	14,260	8	112 villages. 99% Pashtun, 1% Baloch.
Kajaki		116,827	2184	53	220 villages. 100% Pashtun.
Khanashin (Reg)		26,348	7,064	4	52% Pashtun, 48% Baloch.
Lashkargah	Lashkargah	194,473	1,891	103	160 villages. 60% Pashtun, 20% Baloch, 20% Hindu, Hazara and Uzbek.
Marjah	Marjah	30,425	2,904	10	Used to belong to Nad Ali District.
Musa Qala	Musa Qala	121,749	1,209	101	100% Pashtun.
Nad Ali		186,929	3,046	61	80% Pashtun, 10% Hazara, 5% Tajik, 5% Baloch.
Grishk (Nahri Saraj)		174,820	1,554	113	97 villages. 90% Pashtun, 5% Hazara, 5% Baloch.
Nawa-I-Barakzayi		111,259	617	180	350 villages. 99% Pashtun, 1% Farsiwan, Hindu and Sikh.
Nawzad		97,824	5,318	18	100% Pashtun.
Sangin	Sangin	77,353	516	150	100% Pashtun.
Washir		28,945	4,647	6	100% Pashtun.
Herat		2,140,662	55,869	38	39.8% Pashtuns, 37.1% Tajiks, 21.6% Aimaqs, 1.3% Uzbeks, 0.9% Turkmens, 0.2% Hazaras, 0.1% Balochi.
Adraskan		60,716	8,113	7	Predominantly Pashtuns, few Farsiwan (Tajiks).
Chishti Sharif		26,838	1,626	17	Majority Farsiwan (Aimaqs), minority Pashtuns.
Farsi		34,676	2,194	16	Predominantly Farsiwan (Aimaqs, Tajiks), few Pashtuns and Uzbeks.
Ghoryan		101,878	7,934	13	Majority Pashtuns, minority Farsiwan (Tajiks, Aimaqs).
Gulran		106,420	5,544	19	Majority Pashtuns, minority Farsiwan (Aimaqs) and Turkmen.
Guzara		165,940	2,455	68	Mixed Farsiwan (Tajiks) and Pashtuns.
Herat	Herat	574,276	234	2,452	Majority Farsiwan (Tajiks), minority Pashtuns, few Hazaras, Uzbeks, Turkmens and others.
Injil/Enjil		276,479	896	308	Majority Farsiwan (Aimaqs, Tajiks), minority Pashtuns.
Karukh		72,530	2,123	34	Majority Farsiwan (Aimaqs), minority Pashtuns.
Kohsan		61,513	2,688	23	60% Pashtuns, 35% Farsiwan (Tajiks, Aimaqs), 5% Baloch.
Kushk		141,585	2,959	48	Majority Farsiwan (Aimaqs), minority Pashtuns, few Turkmens.
Kushki Kuhna		51,682	1,817	28	55% Tajik, 40% Pashtun, 5% Hazara.
Obe		85,836	2,427	35	Majority Farsiwan (Aimaqs, Tajiks), minority Uzbeks, few Pashtuns.
Pashtun Zarghun		113,329	2,196	52	Majority Farsiwan (Tajiks, Aimaqs), minority Pashtuns.
Shindand	Shindand	202,395	15,760	13	Majority Pashtuns, minority Farsiwan (Tajiks, Aimaqs).
Zinda Jan		64,569	2,542	25	Predominantly Farsiwan (Tajiks, Aimaqs), few Pashtuns.
Jowzjan		602,082	11,292	53	50.8% Uzbeks, 19.3% Pashtuns, 14.4% Farsiwans, 10.5% Turkmens (1.7% Afsharids), 4.8% Hazaras.
Aqcha		87,265	611	143	Predominantly Uzbek, few Pashtun.
Darzab		55,635	489	114	Predominantly Uzbek, few Pashtun.
Fayzabad		47,032	824	57	50% Uzbek, 20% Turkmen, 20% Farsiwan, 10% Pashtun.
Khamyab		15,811	912	17	Predominantly Turkmen.
Khaniqa		26,306	341	77	Predominantly Uzbek, few Pashtuns. Used to belong to Aqcha District.
Khwaja Du Koh		30,424	2,042	15	Mixed Uzbeks, Afsharid Turkmen and Farsiwan.
Mardyan		43,577	657	66	Predominantly Pashtun, few Turkmen.
Mingajik		48,493	907	53	Mixed Uzbek and Pashtun.
Qarqin		28,243	981	29	Predominantly Turkmen.
Qush Tepa		26,572	883	30	Mixed Uzbek and Pashtun. Used to belong to Darzab District.
Sheberghan	Sheberghan	192,724	1,951	99	Majority Uzbek and Farsiwan, minority Pashtun and Hazara.
Kabul		5,204,667	4,524	1,150	44.8% Tajiks (4.3% Qizilbash), 29.3% Pashtuns, 21.6% Hazaras, 1.7% Uzbeks, 0.9% Turkmens, 0.9% Balochi, 0.9% Hindus, 0.1% Pashai.
Bagrami	Bagrami	62,709	230	272	Pashtuns (majority), Tajik
Chahar Asyab	Qalai Naeem	41,452	246	168	Pashtuns, Tajiks, and few Hazara
Deh Sabz	Tarakhel	61,115	525	117	70% Pashtuns; 30% Tajiks
Farza	Dehnawe Farza	24,313	85	287	Mix Pashtuns and Tajiks Created in 2005 from Mir Bacha Kot District
Guldara	Guldara	25,907	84	310	70% Tajiks; 30% Pashtuns
Istalif	Istalif	37,998	108	354	Mix of Tajik, Pashtun, and Hazara
Kabul (city)	Kabul	4,434,550	383	11,575	45% Tajiks (5% Qizilbash), 25% Pashtuns, 25% Hazaras, 2% Uzbeks, 1% Turkmen, 1% Balochi, 1% Hindu.
Kalakan	Kalakan	34,278	73	470	Predominantly Tajik and some Pashtuns
Khaki Jabbar	Khak-i Jabbar	16,209	590	27	95% Pashtuns; 5% Tajiks
Mir Bacha Kot	Mir Bacha Kot	59,122	62	956	Tajiks and some Pashtun families Split in 2005 to create a new Farza District
Mussahi	Mussahi	26,439	119	222	Pashtuns and a number of Tajik families
Paghman	Paghman	138,507	385	360	70% Pashtuns; 30% Tajiks
Qarabagh	Qara Bagh	86,358	214	403	60% Tajiks; 40% Pashtuns
Shakardara	Shakar Dara	93,001	271	344	Either majority Tajik or majority Pashtun
Surobi	Surobi	62,709	1,314	48	90% Pashtuns; 10% Pashais
Kandahar		1,399,594	54,845	26	98.7% Pashtuns, 0.9% Balochi, 0.1% Tajiks, 0.1% Hazaras, 0.1% Uzbeks, 0.2% others.
Arghandab		70,016	606	116	79 villages. Pashtun
Arghistan		38,928	3,728	10	Pashtun
Daman		39,193	4,179	9	Pashtun.
Ghorak		10,895	1,742	6	Pashtun
Kandahar	Kandahar	632,601	114	5,539	Predominantly Pashtun, few Baloch, Tajik, Hazara, Uzbek.
Khakrez		25,774	1,738	15	Pashtun
Maruf		37,333	3,335	11	Pashtun
Maiwand		66,297	2,963	22	160 villages. 95% Pashtun and 5% other.
Miyanishin		17,006	803	21	Pashtun. Used to be part of Shah Wali Kot District.
Nesh		15,146	1,110	14	Pashtun. Used to belong to Uruzgan Province.
Panjwayi		98,448	5,841	17	Pashtun
Reg		10,097	13,470	1	Baloch and Pashtun
Shah Wali Kot		49,025	3,345	15	Pashtun
Shorabak		13,020	4,153	3	Pashtun and Baloch
Spin Boldak		113,727	2,963	38	Pashtun
Takhta-pul		14,349	2,926	5	Pashtun
Zhari		96,987	745,1	130	Pashtun. Created out of Maiwand and Panjwayi District.
Dand		50,752	617	82	Pashtun
Kapisa		488,298	1,908	256	57.4% Tajiks, 28.5% Pashtuns, 14.1% Pashayi.
Alasay		42,780	327	131	60% Pashayi in the upper half of the district and 40% Pashtuns in its lower half.
Hesa Awal Kohistan		76,925	88	872	Tajiks. Created in 2005 within Kohistan District
Hesa Duwum Kohistan		50,885	38	1,346	Tajiks. Created in 2005 within Kohistan District
Koh Band		26,572	163	163	Pashayi
Mahmud Raqi	Mahmud-i-Raqi	72,716	173	422	70% Tajiks and 30% Pashtuns
Nijrab	Nijrab	127,013	594	214	80% Tajiks, 14% Pashtuns and 6% Pashayi
Tagab	Tagab	91,407	497	184	90% Pashtuns and 10% Pashayi
Khost		636,522	4,235	150	99.8% Pashtuns, 0.2% Tajiks.
Bak		24,977	139	180	>99% Pashtun.
Gurbuz		29,627	379	78	>99% Pashtun.
Jaji Maydan		27,236	331	82	>99% Pashtun.
Khost	Khost	156,106	418	373	Predominantly Pashtun, few Tajiks.
Mandozayi		63,772	128	498	>99% Pashtun.
Musa Khel		46,368	470	99	>99% Pashtun.
Nadir Shah Kot		36,005	381	94	>99% Pashtun.
Qalandar		11,559	100	116	>99% Pashtun.
Sabari		80,114	259	310	>99% Pashtun.
Shamal		15,411	169	91	>99% Pashtun.
Spera		27,501	499	55	>99% Pashtun.
Tani		67,360	410	164	>99% Pashtun.
Tirazayi		50,486	427	118	>99% Pashtun.
Kunar		499,393	4,926	101	97.9% Pashtuns, 0.7% Nuristanis, 0.7% Pashayi, 0.7% Gujars, <0.1% Tajiks.
Asadabad	Asadabad	38,374	84	455	100% Pashtun. Is the Capital of Kunar Province, which includes Asadabad and adjacent towns, immediately surrounding the confluence of the Pech and Kunar Rivers
Bar Kunar	Asmar	24,844	187	133	100% Pashtun. Formerly known as Asmar District.
Chapa Dara	Chapa Dara	35,074	417	85	100% Pashtun.
Chawkay		40,389	245	167	100% Pashtun. Also known as Sawkai District.
Dangam		19,132	176	109	98% Pashtun, 2% Tajik.
Dara-I-Pech		61,779	418	148	100% Pashtun. Commonly known as the Pech District or Manogai District
Ghaziabad	Ghaziabad	21,124	578	37	100% Pashtun. Formerly northern Bar Kunar District.
Khas Kunar		39,592	209	190	100% Pashtun. Khas Kunar District is the largest district in the Kunar Province.
Marawara		23,118	147	157	100% Pashtun.
Narang Aw Badil		34,145	187	183	100% Pashtun.
Nari		31,222	305	103	60% Pashtun, 40% Nuristani, Gujar and Kohistani (Pashai).
Nurgal		35,739	302	118	100% Pashtun.
Shaigal		13,585	336	40	100% Pashtun. Formed from northeastern Dangam District.
Shultan		19,497	93	209	100% Pashtun. Formed from northeastern Dangam District.
Sirkani		30,823	320	96	100% Pashtun.
Wata Pur		30,956	215	144	100% Pashtun. Formed from northwestern Asadabad District
Kunduz		1,136,677	8,081	141	33.2% Pashtuns, 26.8% Uzbeks, 21.8% Tajiks, 9.9% Turkmens, 6.1% Hazaras, 1.1% Pashayi.
Ali Abad		53,276	565	94	47% Pashtuns, 33% Tajiks, 12% Hazara, 8% Uzbeks
Archi		95,903	676	142	40% Pashtuns, 35% Uzbeks, 15% Tajiks, 10% Turkmen
Chardara		83,037	1,158	72	33% Uzbeks, 25% Tajiks, 22% Pashtuns, 17% Turkmen, 3% Hazara
Imam Sahib	Sherkhan Bandar	264,555	1,778	149	45% Uzbeks, 25% Pashtuns, 25% Tajiks, <1% Hazara Includes the Kalbaad District.
Khan Abad		184,062	1,092	169	40% Pashtuns, 25% Tajiks, 20% Hazara, 10% Uzbeks, 5% Pashai Includes the Aqtash District.
Kunduz	Kunduz	376,232	612	615	33% Pashtuns, 27% Uzbeks, 22% Tajiks, 11% Turkmen, 6% Hazara, 1% Pashai Includes the Gul Tepah District.
Qalay-I-Zal		79,612	1,984	40	60% Turkmen, 40% Pashtuns
Laghman		493,488	3,978	124	52.0% Pashtuns, 26.7% Pashai, 21.3% Tajiks.
Alingar		109,343	804	136	70% Pashtun, 5% Tajik, 25% Pashai.
Alishing		80,645	654	123	60% Pashai, 25% Pashtun, 15% Tajik.
Dawlat Shah		37,599	741	51	70% Pashai, 29% Tajik, 1% Pashtun.
Mihtarlam	Mihtarlam	155,097	758	205	60% Pashtun, 35% Tajik, 5% Pashai. Includes the Badpash District.
Qarghayi		110,804	944	117	60% Pashtun, 20% Tajik, 20% Pashai.
Logar		434,374	4,568	95	64.0% Tajiks, 36.0% Pashtuns, 0.3% Hazaras.
Azra		22,985	777	30	100% Pashtuns.
Baraki Barak		99,210	239	416	Predominantly Tajiks, few Pashtuns.
Charkh		50,220	304	165	Majority Tajiks and minority Pashtuns.
Kharwar		29,628	469	63	Majority Pashtuns, minority Tajiks.
Khoshi		27,236	398	69	65% Tajiks, 1% Hazaras and 34% Pashtuns.
Mohammad Agha		85,295	1,076	79	60% Pashtuns and 40% Tajiks.
Puli Alam	Puli Alam	119,800	1,131	106	Majority Tajiks and minority of Pashtuns, few Hazaras.
Nangarhar		1,701,698	7,641	223	92.5% Pashtuns (89.5% Pashtun tribes, 3.0% Pashtunized Arabs), 4.8% Pashayi, 2.3% Hazaras, 0.3% Hindus, 0.1% Uzbeks, <0.1% Tajiks.
Jalalabad	Jalalabad	271,867	122	2,228	85% Pashtun, 9% Hazara, 6% Pashai and other.
Haska Meyna/Deh Bala	Haska Meyna	45,570	337	135	100% Pashtun.
Shinwar	Shinwar	67,758	133	508	100% Pashtun.
Achin	Achin	113,328	466	243	100% Pashtun. Includes the Spin Ghar District.
Bihsud	Bishud	128,474	265	485	95% Pashtun and Pashtunized Arab, 5% Hazara. Used to belong to Jalalabad District.
Chaparhar	Chaparhar	68,156	277	246	100% Pashtun.
Darai Nur	Darai Nur	45,571	253	180	99% Pashai, 1% Pashtun.
Bati Kot	Bati Kot	85,562	195	438	100% Pashtun.
Dur Baba	Dur Baba	26,306	302	87	100% Pashtun.
Goshta	Goshta	30,823	523	59	100% Pashtun.
Hisarak	Hisarak	34,809	620	56	100% Pashtun.
Kama	Kama	86,890	229	380	97% Pashtun, 2% Uzbek, 1% Hazara.
Khogyani	Kaga	147,745	789	187	100% Pashtun.
Kot	Kot	58,857	188	313	99% Pashtun, 1% Tajik. Created in 2005 within Rodat District
Kuz Kunar	Kuz Kunar	62,178	298	209	75% Pashtun, 25% Pashai and others.
Lal Pur	Lal Pur	23,117	475	49	100% Pashtun.
Momand Dara	Momand Dara	50,752	240	211	100% Pashtun.
Nazyan	Nayzan	16,607	188	88	100% Pashtun.
Pachir Aw Agam	Pachir Aw Agam	48,095	516	93	100% Pashtun.
Rodat		78,121	272	287	100% Pashtun. Sub-divided in 2005
Sherzad		74,932	480	156	100% Pashtun.
Surkh Rod		136,180	312	437	88% Pashtun, 5% Hazara, 7% Pashai, Hindu and others.
Nimruz		183,554	42,410	4	42.2% Balochi, 36.3% Pashtuns, 16.9% Tajiks, 4.6% Brahui.
Chahar Burjak		29,893	20,730	1	65 villages. 88% Baloch, 10% Brahawi, 1% Pashtun, and 1% Tajik.
Chakhansur	Chakhansur	26,837	8,856	3	160 villages. Pashtun, Tajik and Baluch .
Kang		25,376	898	28	119 villages. 60% Pashtun, 25% Baloch, 15% Tajik.
Khash Rod	Khash	36,138	8,066	4	63 villages. 55% Pashtun, 20% Baluch, 15% Brahawi, 10% Tajik. Includes the Delaram District.
Zaranj	Zaranj	65,310	1,716	38	242 villages. 44% Baloch, 34% Pashtun, and 22% Tajik.
Nuristan		163,814	9,267	18	99.9% Nuristani, 0.1% Gujars, <0.1% Tajiks.
Barg-i Matal		17,537	1,731	10	100% Nuristani.
Du Ab		8,902	652	14	99% Nuristani, 1% Gujar. Established in 2004, formerly part of Nuristan District and Mandol District
Kamdesh	Kamdesh	28,564	1,452	20	100% Nuristani.
Mandol		22,320	1,996	11	99% Nuristani, 1% Gujar and Tajik. Lost territory to Du Ab District in 2004
Nurgram		36,536	943	39	100% Nuristani. Established in 2004, formerly part of Nuristan District and Wama District
Parun	Parun	15,279	1,509	10	100% Nuristani. Established in 2004, formerly part of Wama District
Wama		12,489	389	32	100% Nuristani. Lost territory to Parun District and Nurgram District in 2004
Waygal		22,187	907	24	100% Nuristani.
Paktia		611,952	5,583	110	93.3% Pashtuns, 6.7% Tajiks.
Ahmad Aba		31,488	364	86	Pashtuns. Created in 2005 within Said Karam District; includes the unofficial district Mirzaka
Ahmadkhel		25,775	220	117	Pashtuns
Dand Aw Patan		30,027	219	137	Pashtuns
Gardez		95,663	679	141	60% Pashtun and 40% Tajik. Includes the capital Gardez, which lies at the crossroads of the province's main north–south and east–west roads
Gerda Serai		12,642	293	43	Pashtuns
Janikhel District		39,459	353	112	Pashtuns
Laja Mangal District		21,258	193	110	Pashtuns
Mirzaka		9,698	220	44	Pashtuns
Rohani Baba		23,018	653	35	Pashtuns
Said Karam		62,975	256	246	95% Pashtuns and 5% Tajiks. Sub-divided in 2005
Shwak		6,245	114	55	Pashtuns
Chamkani		56,465	301	188	Pashtuns. Includes the town of Chamkani (called Share Now), the largest in the eastern half of Paktia and a major gateway to Pakistan
Zadran		27,480	263	104	Pashtuns. Sub-divided in 2005 to create Gerda Serai
Zazi (Jaji)		71,212	591	120	100% Pashtuns. People fleeing sectarian strife between Shiites and Sunnis in Pakistan occasionally take refuge in Zazi
Zurmat		98,547	747	132	97% Pashtuns and 3% Tajiks. Populous, relatively prosperous agricultural district. Unlike most other districts, Zurmat includes more than one tribal group, making it somewhat more fractious than other districts.
Paktika		775,498	19,516	40	96.4% Pashtuns, 3.6% Tajiks, <0.1% Hazaras.
Barmal	Angur Ada	78,351	952	81	100% Pashtun. Includes Barmal, Shkin & Margha Cities.
Dila		77,006	952	81	100% Pashtun.
Gayan		47,848	1,372	35	100% Pashtun.
Gomal	Shkin	46,586	4,108	11	100% Pashtun.
Janikhel		36,873	1,052	35	100% Pashtun. Created in 2004 within Khairkot District.
Khairkot (Zarghun Shar or Katawaz)	Khairkot	42,044	403	105	100% Pashtun. Sub-divided in 2004.
Mata Khan		27,189	405	67	Predominantely Pashtun, few Tajik.
Nika		17,041	129	132	100% Pashtun.
Omna		23,811	468	51	100% Pashtun.
Sar Hawza		37,053	707	52	100% Pashtun.
Surobi		38,855	451	86	100% Pashtun.
Sharana	Sharana	64,774	487	133	Predominantely Pashtun, few Tajik and Hazara.
Terwa		11,266	1,034	11	100% Pashtun. Created in 2004 within Waza Khwa District.
Urgun	Urgun	90,549	481	188	Majority Pashtun, minority Tajik.
Wazakhwa	Wazakhwa	46,647	2,336	20	100% Pashtun. Sub-divided in 2004
Wor Mamay		21,777	3,052	7	100% Pashtun.
Yahyakhel		29,771	321	93	100% Pashtun. Created in 2004 within Khairkot District.
Yusufkhel		29,193	590	50	100% Pashtun. Created in 2004 within Khairkot District.
Zerok	Zerok	39,415	274	144	100% Pashtun.
Panjshir		169,926	3,772	45	99.6% Tajiks, 0.4% Pashtuns (0.3% Pashayi, 0.1% Ormuri).
Abshar		12,488	517	24	Predominantly Tajik, few Pashai.
Anaba		20,328	186	109	Predominantly Tajik, few Ormuri. 31 villages.
Bazarak	Bazarak	21,257	394	54	100% Tajik. 29 villages.
Darah		15,677	192	82	Predominantly Tajik, few Pashai. 134 villages.
Khenj		45,172	689	66	100% Tajik. 154 villages.
Paryan		16,740	1,428	12	100% Tajik. 67 villages.
Rokha		25,908	113	230	Predominantly Tajik, few Pashai. 72 villages.
Shotul		12,356	225	55	100% Tajik. 23 villages.
Parwan		737,700	5,715	129	48.5% Tajiks, 38.8% Pashtuns, 12.6% Hazaras.
Bagram		117,181	381	308	60% Tajiks, 35% Pashtuns, 5% Hazara.
Charikar	Charikar	202,210	258	783	Mixed Tajiks and Pashtuns.
Ghorband		109,342	908	120	Mixed Pashtuns, Tajiks and Hazaras.
Jabal Saraj		72,345	99	730	Tajiks.
Kohi Safi		35,075	569	62	Predominantly Pashtuns.
Salang		29,362	547	54	Predominantly Tajiks, few Pashtuns.
Sayed Khel		51,549	31	1,639	Mix Tajiks and Pashtuns. Used to be part of Jabal Saraj District.
Sheikh Ali		27,901	913	31	Predominantly Hazaras.
Shinwari		46,501	722	64	Predominantly Pashtuns.
Surkhi Parsa		46,234	1,152	40	Mixed Hazaras and Tajiks.
Samangan		430,489	13,438	32	32.1% Hazaras (26.1% Shiites, 6.0% Sunni Tatars), 28.3% Uzbeks, 26.8% Farsiwans (25.7% Tajiks, 1.1% Persianized Arabs), 11.4% Pashtuns, 1.4% others.
Aybak	Samangan	118,537	2,145	55	96 villages. 55% Uzbek, 35% Tajik, 5% Pashtun, 5% other.
Darah Sof Balla	Dari Suf Bala	73,072	2,283	32	146 villages. 100% Hazara. Used to be part of Darah Sof District.
Darah Sof Payan	Dari Suf Payan	80,778	1,699	48	209 villages. Majority Uzbek and minority Pashtun. Used to be part of Darah Sof District.
Feroz Nakhchir	Feroz Nakhchir	14,747	930	16	22 villages. Mixed Pashtun and Tajik. Used to be part of Aybak District.
Hazrat Sultan	Hazrat Sultan	46,766	2,102	22	66 villages. Majority Hazara, minority Tajik, Pashtun, Arab.
Khuram Wa Sarbagh	Khuram Wa Sarbagh	45,039	1,815	25	52 villages. Majority Tajik, minority Pashtun and Hazara.
Ruyi Du Ab	Ruyi	51,550	2,477	21	83 villages. Mixed Tajik and Hazara (Tatar tribe).
Sar-e Pol		621,002	16,386	38	43.3% Uzbeks, 38.6% Hazaras, 18.1% Pashtuns, 0.2% Kyrgyz.
Balkhab		56,864	2,958	19	Predominantly Hazaras, few Pashtuns.
Gosfandi		64,038	620	103	Majority Hazaras, minority Uzbeks. Used to belong to Sancharak District.
Kohistanat		90,477	5,771	16	Mixed Uzbeks, Pashtuns, Hazaras.
Sancharak		115,050	1,316	87	Majority Hazaras, minority Uzbeks, few Kyrgyz.
Sare-Pol	Sar-e-Pol	176,994	2,442	72	Majority Uzbeks, minority Pashtuns.
Sayyad		61,646	1,334	46	Predominantely Uzbeks, few Pashtuns.
Sozma Qala		55,933	531	105	Mixed Pashtuns and Hazaras.
Takhar		1,093,092	12,458	88	46.0% Uzbeks, 42.1% Tajiks, 8.0% Pashtuns, 2.1% Hazaras, 0.6% Gujar, <0.1% Balochi, <0.1% Turkmens, 1.2% others.
Baharak		34,942	379	92	74 villages. 83% Uzbek, 10% Pashtun, 5% Tajik, 2% Hazara.
Bangi		39,725	434	92	59 villages. 80% Uzbek, 10% Tajik, 6% Hazara, 4% Pashtun.
Chah Ab		90,011	833	108	63 villages. 97% Tajik, 3% Uzbek.
Chal		31,885	404	79	58 villages. 55% Uzbek, 38% Tajik, 6% Hazara, 1% Pashtun, 1% Gujar.
Darqad		30,424	310	98	34 villages. Predominantely Uzbek, few Tajik.
Dashti Qala		36,137	314	115	49 villages. 70% Uzbek, 25% Tajiks, 5% Pashtuns
Farkhar		53,051	1,306	41	75 villages. 94% Tajik, 5% Hazara, 1% other.
Hazar Sumuch		15,545	265	59	28 villages. Predominantely Pashtun, few Turkmen, Tajik, Uzbek.
Ishkamish		66,695	948	70	103 villages. 40% Tajik, 30% Uzbek, 20% Pashtun, 10% Gujar.
Kalafgan		39,858	526	76	42 villages 95% Uzbek, 2% Hazara, 2% Tajik, 1% Pashtun.
Khwaja Bahauddin		26,306	182	144	25 villages. Predominantely Uzbek.
Khwaja Ghar		76,132	404	188	62 villages. 70% Uzbek, 20% Pashtun, 10% Tajik, <1% Hazara.
Namak Ab		13,817	431	32	28 villages. 100% Tajik.
Rustaq		186,144	1,824	102	179 villages 50% Uzbek, 50% Tajiks, <1% Pashtun, <1% Baloch
Taluqan	Taluqan	258,724	833	311	40% Uzbek, 40% Tajik, 10% Pashtun, 5% Hazara, 5% others
Warsaj		42,914	2,668	16	94 villages. 100% Tajik.
Yangi Qala		50,782	360	141	64 villages 65% Uzbeks, 18% Pashtun, 15% Tajik, 2% Hazara.
Uruzgan		436,079	11,474	38	50.5% Pashtuns, 49.6% Hazaras.
Shahidi Hassas		66,695	2,261	30	Predominantely Hazara, few Pashtun.
Chora		72,276	2,189	33	Mixed Pashtun and Hazara. Includes Chinarto District.
Deh Rawood		69,213	1,360	51	Majority Pashtun, minority Hazara.
Gizab		47,632	2,520	19	126 villages. Predominantely Hazaras, few Pashtun. Used to belong to Daykundi Province.
Khas Uruzgan		63,904	2,821	23	Majority Hazara, minority Pashtun.
Tarinkot	Tarinkot	116,359	1,974	59	Predominantely Pashtun, few Hazara.
Wardak		660,258	10,348	64	63.9% Pashtuns, 33.5% Hazaras, 2.5% Tajiks.
Chaki Wardak	Chaki Wardak	95,392	1,153	83	Predominantely Pashtuns.
Day Mirdad	Miran	35,075	976	36	63% Pashtuns, 37% Hazaras.
Hisa-I-Awali Bihsud		41,850	1,406	30	Majority Hazaras, minority Pashtuns.
Jaghatu		51,682	595	87	100% Pashtuns. Shifted from Ghazni Province in 2005.
Jalrez		59,920	1,182	51	Majority Hazaras, minority Pashtuns, few Tajiks.
Markazi Bihsud	Behsud	134,852	3,616	37	Predominantly Hazaras.
Maidan Shar	Maidan Shar	45,787	211	217	85% Pashtuns, 14% Tajiks, 1% Hazaras.
Nirkh		64,436	530	122	80% Pashtuns, 15% Tajiks, 5% Hazaras.
Saydabad	Saydabad	131,264	1,130	116	Predominantely Pashtuns.
Zabul		384,349	17,472	22	99.4% Pashtuns, 0.6% Tajiks, <0.1% Hazaras.
Arghandab		36,934	1,490	25	100% Pashtun. Sub-divided in 2005
Atghar		14,059	458	31	100% Pashtun.
Daychopan		44,508	1,491	30	100% Pashtun.
Kakar		27,234	981	28	99% Pashtun, 1% Hazara. Created in 2005 within Arghandab District Also known as Khak-e-Afghan Province.
Mezana		21,623	1,079	20	100% Pashtun.
Naw Bahar		24,534	1,137	22	100% Pashtun. Created in 2005 from parts of Shamulzayi and Shinkay Districts
Qalat	Qalat	44,928	1,914	23	95% Pashtun, 5% Tajik.
Shah Joy		79,889	1,878	43	100% Pashtun.
Shamulzayi		36,515	3,295	11	100% Pashtun.
Shinkay		31,911	1,861	17	100% Pashtun.
Tarnak Aw Jaldak		22,214	1,434	15	100% Pashtun.
throughout Afghanistan		1,500,000			
		1,500,000			100% nomadic Pashtuns (Kochis), living throughout Afghanistan, especially central and southern Afghanistan.
Afghanistan		32,890,200	652,864	50	48.2% Pashtuns (incl. 4.6% Kochis, 0.9% Pashayi, 0.8% Balochi, 0.2% Pashtunized Arabs, <0.1% Ormuri), 28.2% Farsiwans (incl. 22.4% Tajiks (Note: Many "Tajiks", who are defined as non-tribal Sunni Muslims who speak Dari as their primal language, identify more with the region they live in than with any ethnicity (e. g. the use of ethnic-neutral designations like Kabuli, Herati etc.) and hence in some cases are classified as Tajiks or Farsiwans, even though being Pashtuns, Uzbeks, Qizilbash etc.) (incl. Persianized people (>5.9% Pashtuns, >0.8% Uzbeks, >0.2% Turkmens) amongst others), 2.8% Aimaqs, 0.7% Qizilbash, <0.1% Persianized Arabs), 13.1% Hazaras (incl. 0.2% Sayyids, 0.1% Sunni Tatars, <0.1% Ismailis), 9.8% Turkic (8.0% Uzbeks, 1.7% Turkmens (incl. <0.1% Afsharids), 0.1% Kyrgyz, <0.1% Kazakhs), 1.1% others (incl. 0.5% Nuristanis, 0.3% Indic (0.2% Hindus, <0.1% Sikhs, <0.1% Gujars, <0.1% Brahui), 0.2% Pamiris (Ishkashimi, Munji, Shughni, Wakhi).

== Northern Afghanistan ==
=== North East Afghanistan ===
==== Badakhshan Province ====
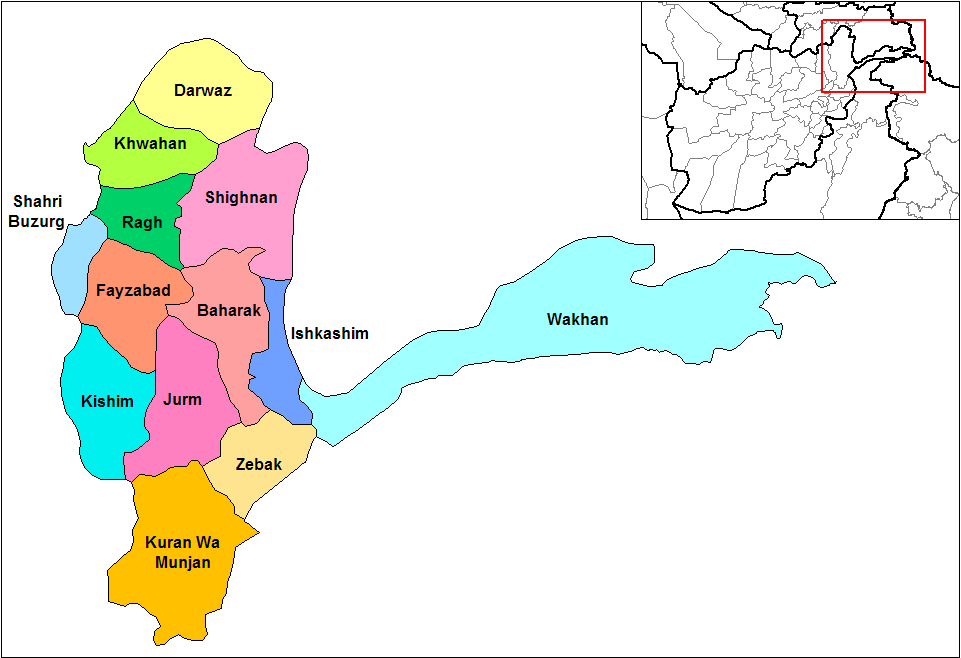
Former districts of Badakshan

- Arghanj Khwa – formerly part of Fayzabad District
- Argo – formerly part of Fayzabad District
- Baharak
- Darayim – formerly part of Fayzabad District
- Fayzabad
- Ishkashim
- Jurm
- Khash – formerly part of Jurm District
- Khwahan
- Kishim
- Kohistan – formerly part of Baharak District
- Kuf Ab – formerly part of Khwahan District
- Kuran wa Munjan
- Maimay – formerly part of Darwaz District
- Nusay – formerly part of Darwaz District
- Ragh
- Shahri Buzurg
- Shekay – formerly part of Darwaz District
- Shighnan
- Shuhada – formerly part of Baharak District
- Tagab - formerly part of Fayzabad District
- Tishkan – formerly part of Kishim District
- Wakhan
- Wurduj – formerly part of Baharak District
- Yaftali Sufla - formerly part of Fayzabad District
- Yamgan – formerly part of Baharak District
- Yawan – formerly part of Ragh District
- Zebak

==== Baghlan Province ====
Districts of Baghlan

- Andarab
- Baghlan – now part of Baghlani Jadid District
- Baghlani Jadid
- Burka
- Dahana i Ghuri
- Dih Salah – formerly part of Andarab District
- Dushi
- Farang wa Gharu – formerly part of Khost Wa Fereng District
- Guzargahi Nur – formerly part of Khost Wa Fereng District
- Khinjan
- Khost wa Fereng
- Khwaja Hijran – formerly part of Andarab District
- Nahrin
- Puli Hisar – formerly part of Andarab District
- Puli Khumri
- Tala wa Barfak

==== Kunduz Province ====
Districts of Kunduz

- Aliabad
- Archi
- Char Dara
- Imam Sahib
- Khan Abad
- Kunduz
- Qalay-I-Zal
- Aaqtash
- Gul Tepa
- Kalbaad

==== Takhar Province ====
Districts of Takhar

- Baharak – formerly part of Taluqan District
- Bangi
- Chah Ab
- Chal
- Darqad
- Dashti Qala – formerly part of Khwaja Ghar District
- Farkhar
- Hazar Sumuch –formerly part of Taluqan District
- Ishkamish
- Kalafgan
- Khwaja Bahauddin – formerly part of Yangi Qala District
- Khwaja Ghar
- Namak Ab – formerly part of Taluqan District
- Rustaq
- Taluqan
- Warsaj
- Yangi Qala

=== North West Afghanistan ===
==== Balkh Province ====
Districts of Balkh

- Balkh
- Chahar Bolak
- Chahar Kint
- Chimtal
- Dawlatabad
- Dihdadi
- Kaldar
- Khulmi
- Kishindih
- Marmul
- Mazar-e Sharif
- Nahri Shahi
- Sholgara
- Shortepa
- Zari – formerly part of Kishindih District

==== Faryab Province ====
Districts of Faryab

- Almar
- Andkhoy
- Bilchiragh
- Dawlat Abad
- Gurziwan – formerly part of Bilchiragh District
- Khani Chahar Bagh
- Khwaja Sabz Posh
- Kohistan
- Maymana
- Pashtun Kot
- Qaramqol
- Qaysar
- Qurghan – formerly part of Andkhoy District
- Shirin Tagab

==== Jowzjan Province ====
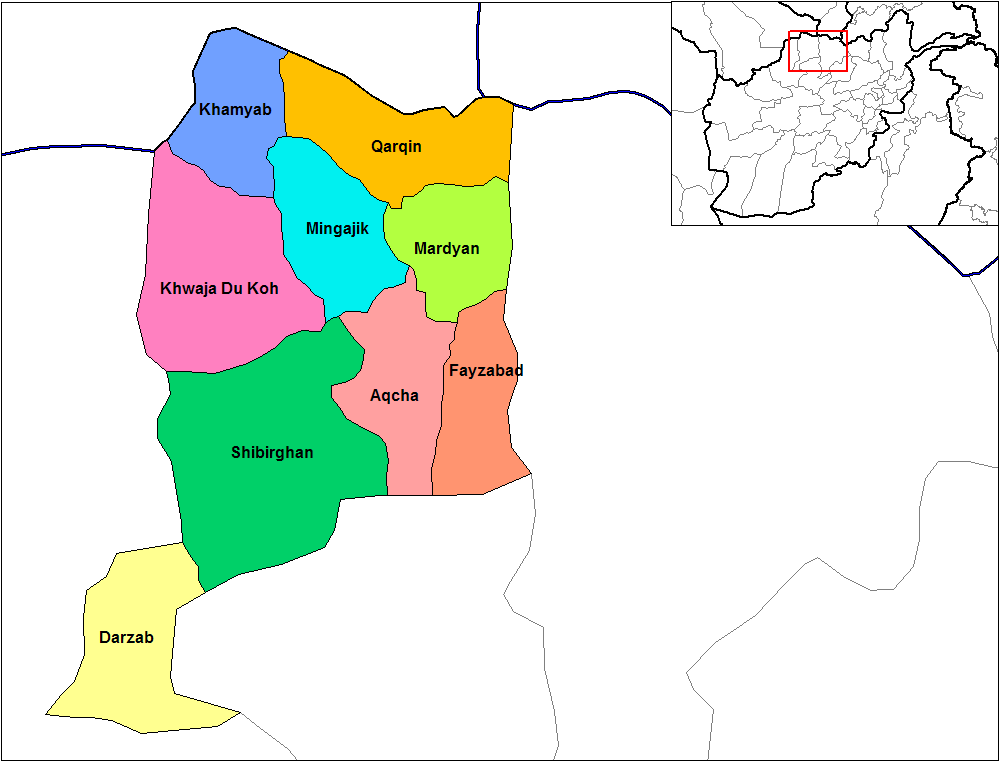
Districts of Jowzjan

- Aqcha
- Darzab
- Fayzabad
- Khamyab
- Khaniqa – formerly part of Aqcha District
- Khwaja Du Koh
- Mardyan
- Mingajik
- Qarqin
- Qush Tepa – formerly part of Darzab District
- Shibirghan

==== Samangan Province ====
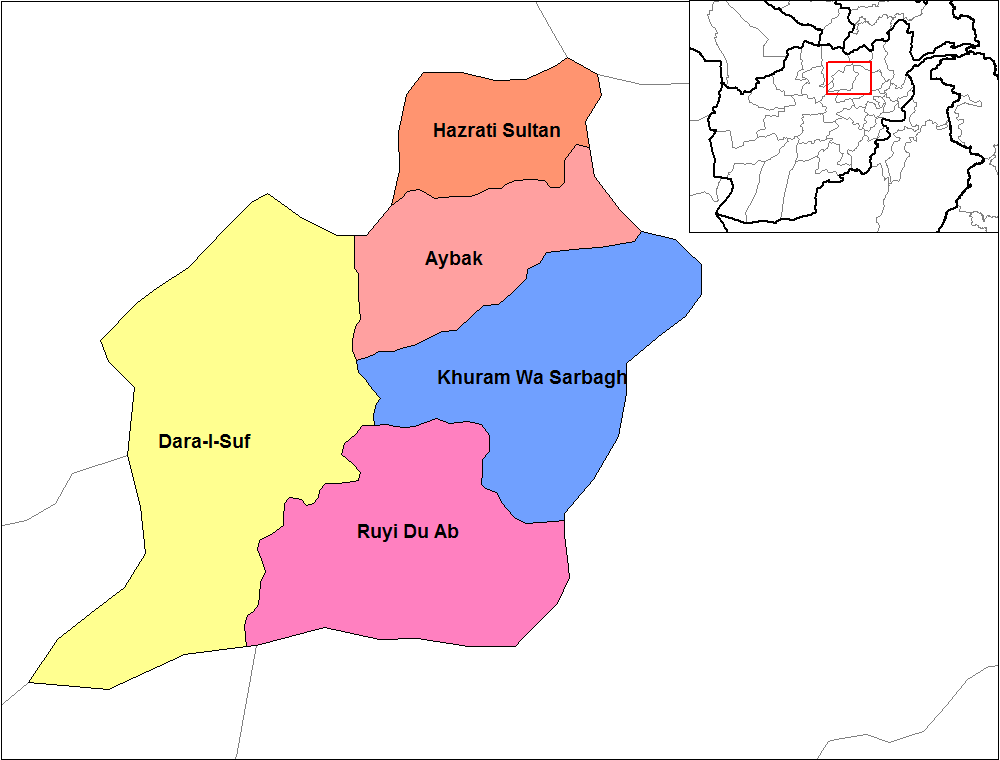
Districts of Samangan

- Aybak
- Dara-I-Sufi Balla – part of the former Dara-I-Suf District
- Dara-I-Sufi Payan – part of the former Dara-I-Suf District
- Feroz Nakhchir – formerly part of Khulmi District; shifted from Balkh Province
- Hazrati Sultan
- Khuram Wa Sarbagh
- Ruyi Du Ab

==== Sar-e Pol Province ====
Districts of Sar-e Pol

- Balkhab
- Gosfandi – formerly part of Sayyad District
- Kohistanat
- Sangcharak
- Sar-e Pul
- Sayyad
- Sozma Qala

== Central Afghanistan ==
=== Central Afghanistan ===
==== Bamyan Province ====
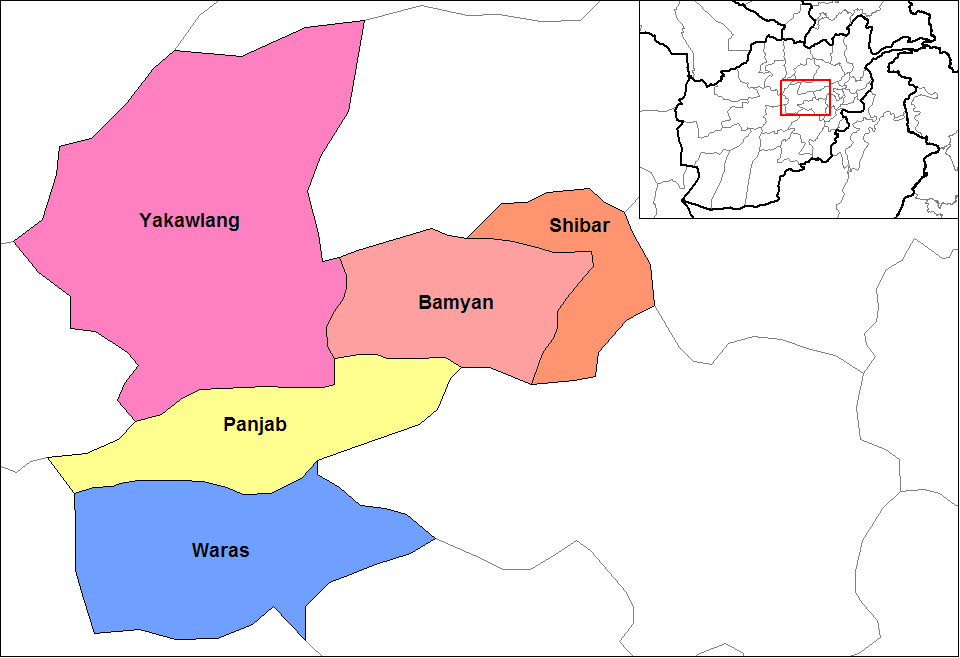
Districts of Bamyan

- Bamyan
- Kahmard - shifted from Baghlan Province
- Panjab
- Sayghan - formerly part of Kahmard District; shifted from Baghlan Province
- Shibar
- Waras
- Yakawlang

==== Kabul Province ====
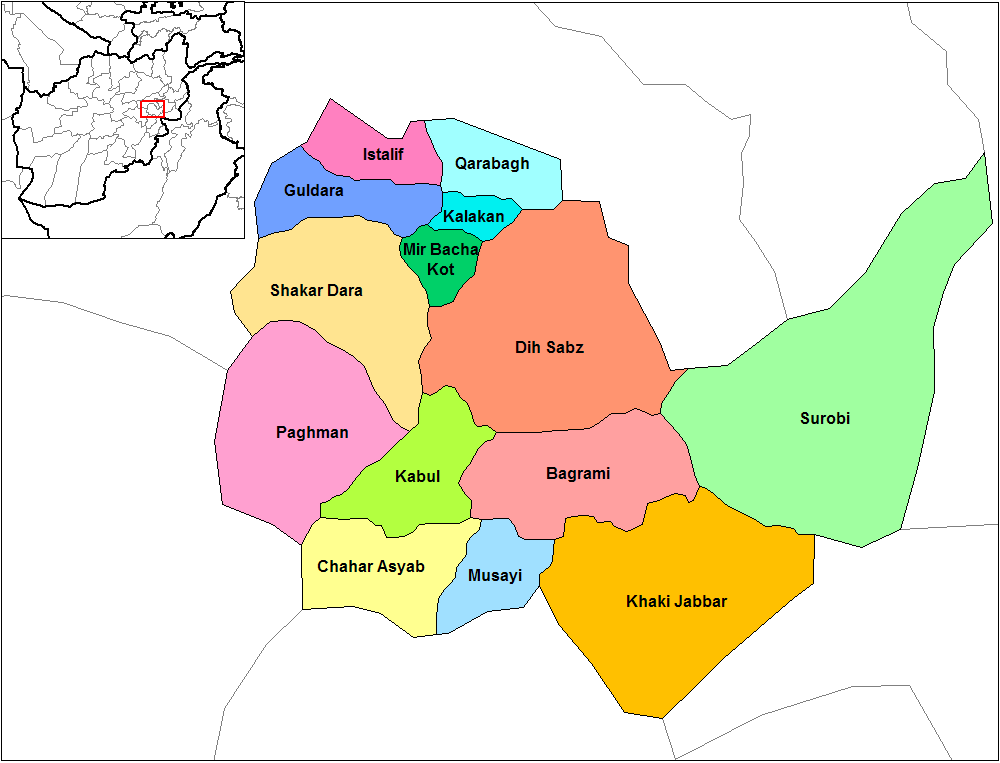
Districts of Kabul

- Bagrami
- Chahar Asyab
- Deh Sabz
- Farza - formerly part of Mir Bacha Kot District
- Guldara
- Istalif
- Kabul
- Kalakan
- Khaki Jabbar
- Mir Bacha Kot
- Mussahi
- Paghman
- Qarabagh
- Shakardara
- Surobi

==== Kapisa Province ====
Districts of Kapisa

- Alasay
- Hesa Awal Kohistan - part of the former Kohistan District
- Hesa Duwum Kohistan - part of the former Kohistan District
- Koh Band
- Mahmud Raqi
- Nijrab
- Tagab

==== Logar Province ====
Districts of Logar

- Azra - shifted from Paktia Province
- Baraki Barak
- Charkh
- Kharwar - formerly part of Charkh District
- Khoshi
- Mohammad Agha
- Puli Alam

==== Panjshir Province ====
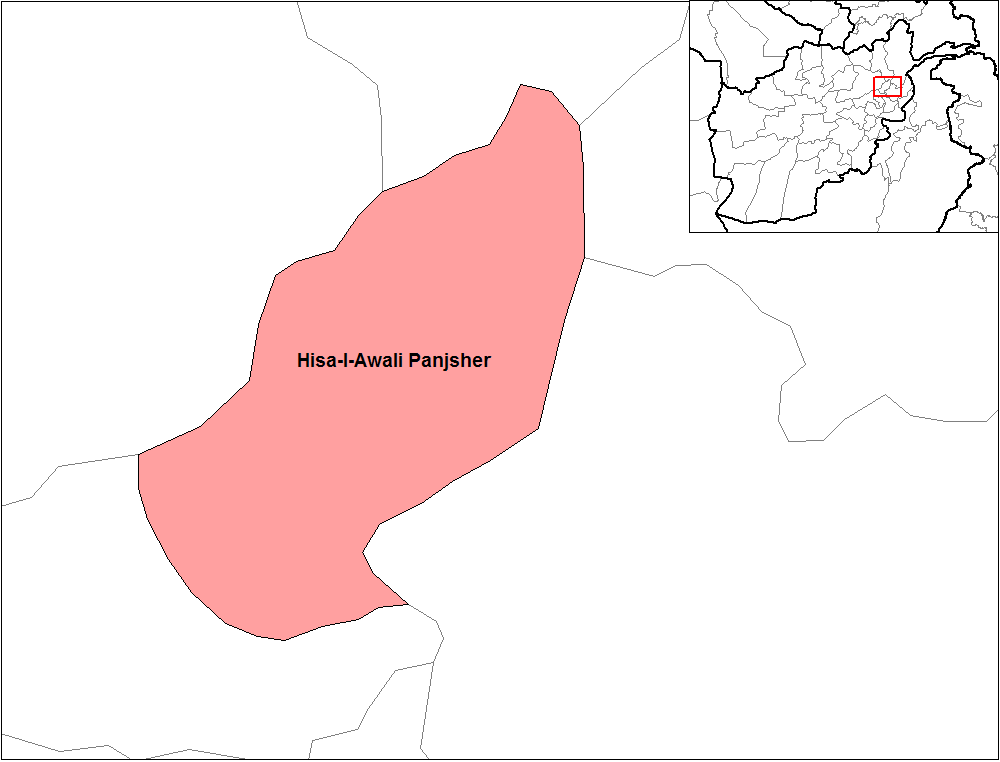
District of Panjshir

- Anaba - part of the former Panjsher District
- Bazarak - part of the former Panjsher District
- Darah Abdullah khail - part of the former Hisa Duwum Panjsher District
- Khenj - part of the former Hisa Awal Panjsher District
- Paryan - part of the former Hisa Awal Panjsher District
- Rokha - created from parts of the former Hisa Duwum Panjsher and Panjsher Districts
- Shotul - part of the former Panjsher District
- Darah Abshar - part of the former Hisa Duwum Panjsher District

==== Parwan Province ====
Districts of Parwan

- Bagram
- Charikar
- Ghorband
- Jabul Saraj
- Kohi Safi
- Salang
- Sayed Khel - formerly part of Jabul Saraj District
- Sheikh Ali
- Shinwari
- Surkhi Parsa

==== Maidan Wardak Province ====
Districts of Wardak

- Chaki
- Day Mirdad
- Hisa-I-Awali Bihsud
- Jaghatu - shifted from Ghazni Province
- Jalrez
- Markazi Bihsud
- Maydan Shahr
- Nirkh
- Saydabad

=== Eastern Afghanistan ===
==== Kunar Province ====
Districts of Kunar

- Asadabad
- Bar Kunar
- Chapa Dara
- Chawkay
- Dangam
- Dara-I-Pech
- Ghaziabad - formerly part of Nurgal District
- Khas Kunar
- Marawara
- Narang Wa Badil
- Nari
- Nurgal
- Shaigal - formerly part of Chapa Dara District
- Shultan - formerly part of Chapa Dara District
- Sirkanai
- Wata Pur - formerly part of Asadabad District
- Shultan - formerly part of Shaygl District

==== Laghman Province ====
Districts of Laghman

- Alingar
- Alishing
- Baad Pakh - formerly part of Mihtarlam District
- Dawlat Shah
- Mihtarlam
- Qarghayi

==== Nangarhar Province ====
Districts of Nangarhar

- Achin
- Bati Kot
- Behsud - formerly part of Jalalabad District
- Chaparhar
- Dara-I-Nur
- Dih Bala
- Dur Baba
- Goshta
- Hisarak
- Jalalabad
- Kama
- Khogyani
- Kot - formerly part of Rodat District
- Kuz Kunar
- Lal Pur
- Muhmand Dara
- Nazyan
- Pachir Wa Agam
- Rodat
- Sherzad
- Shinwar
- Surkh Rod
- Haska Meyna

==== Nuristan Province ====
Districts of Nuristan

- Bargi Matal
- Du Ab - created from parts of Nuristan and Mandol Districts
- Kamdesh
- Mandol
- Nurgaram - created from parts of Nuristan and Wama Districts
- Parun - formerly part of Wama District
- Wama
- Waygal

=== Western Afghanistan ===
==== Badghis Province ====
Districts of Badghis

- Ab Kamari
- Ghormach
- Jawand
- Muqur
- Bala Murghab
- Qadis
- Qala-I-Naw

==== Farah Province ====
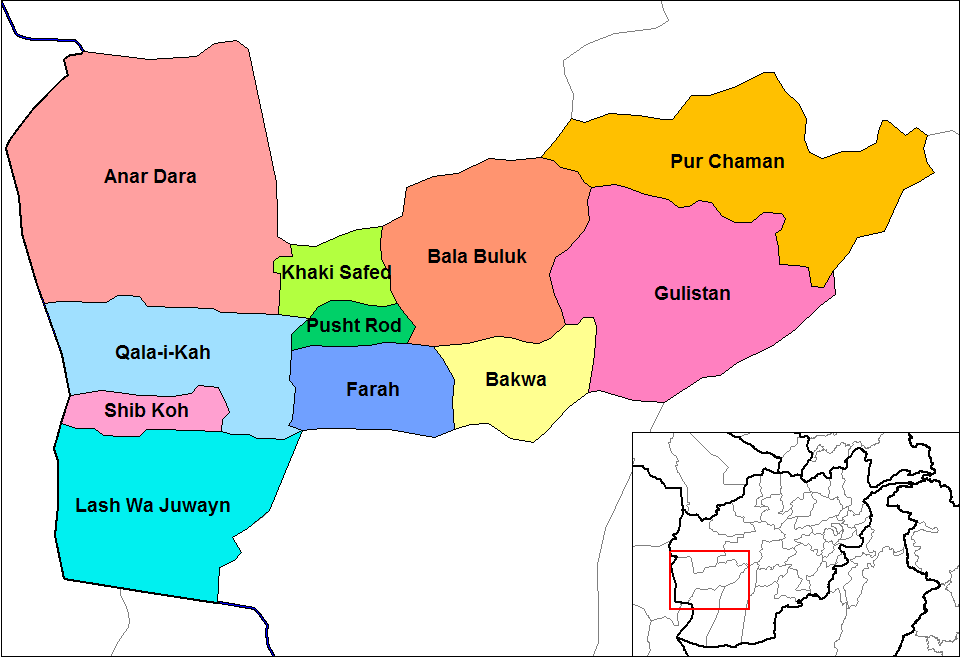
Districts of Farah

- Anar Dara
- Bakwa
- Bala Buluk
- Farah
- Gulistan
- Khaki Safed
- Lash wa Juwayn
- Pur Chaman
- Pusht Rod
- Qala i Kah
- Shib Koh

==== Ghor Province ====
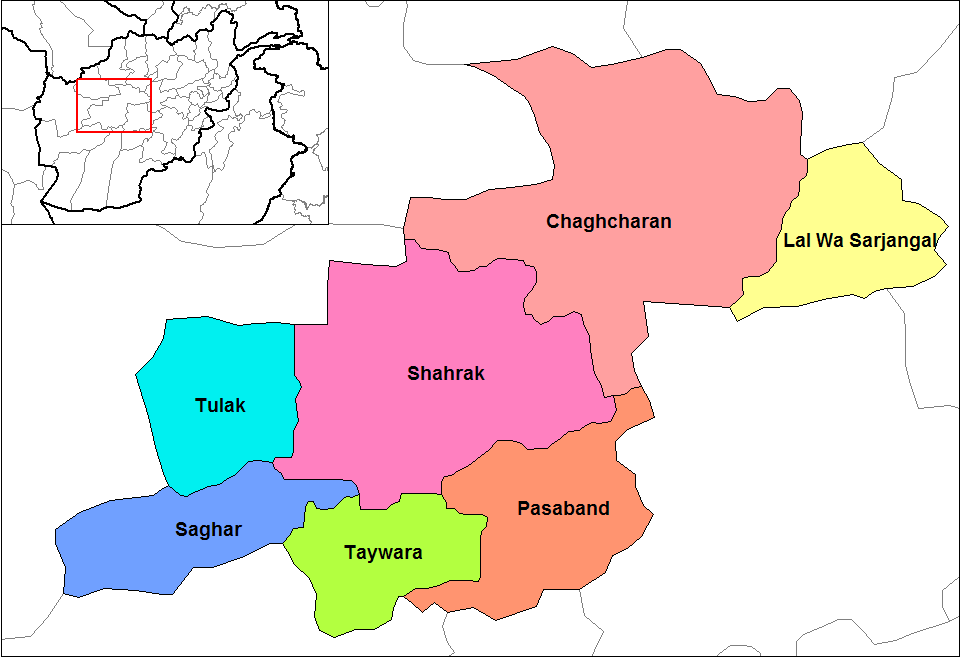
Districts of Ghor

- Chaghcharan (Firozkoh)
- Marghab District - formerly part of ferozkoh.
- Charsada
- Dawlat Yar
- Du Layna District
- Lal Wa Sarjangal
- Pasaband
- Saghar
- Shahrak
- Taywara
- Tulak

==== Herat Province ====
Districts of Herat

- Adraskan
- Chishti Sharif
- Farsi
- Ghoryan
- Gulran
- Guzara
- Hirat
- Injil
- Karukh
- Kohsan
- Kushk
- Kushki Kuhna
- Obe
- Pashtun Zarghun
- Shindand
- Zinda Jan (Pooshang)
- Turghandi
- Islam Qala

== Southern Afghanistan ==
=== South East Afghanistan ===
==== Ghazni Province ====
Districts of Ghazni

- Ab Band
- Ajristan
- Andar
- Dih Yak
- Gelan
- Ghazni City
- Giro
- Jaghatū District
- Jaghuri
- Khugiani - created from parts of Waeez Shahid and Ghazni Districts
- Khwaja Umari - formerly part of Waeez Shahid District
- Malistan
- Muqur
- Nawa
- Nawur
- Qarabagh
- Rashidan - formerly part of Waeez Shahid District
- Waghaz - formerly part of Muqur District
- Zana Khan

==== Khost Province ====
Districts of Khost

- Bak
- Gurbuz
- Jaji Maydan
- Khost (Matun)
- Mandozai
- Musa Khel
- Nadir Shah Kot
- Qalandar
- Sabari
- Shamal - shifted from Paktia Province
- Spera
- Tani
- Tere Zayi

==== Paktia Province ====
Districts of Paktia

- Ahmad Aba - formerly part of Said Karam District
- Ahmadkhel
- Dand Aw Patan
- Gardez
- Janikhel
- Lazha Mangal
- Said Karam
- Shwak
- Tsamkani
- Zadran
- Zazi
- Zurmat
- Rohani Baba
- Mirzaka
- Gerda Serai

==== Paktika Province ====
Districts of Paktika

- Barmal
- Dila
- Gayan
- Gomal
- Janikhel - formerly part of Khairkot District
- Khairkot
- Mata Khan
- Nika
- Omna
- Sar Hawza
- Surobi
- Sharan
- Terwa - formerly part of Wazakhwa District
- Urgun
- Wazakhwa
- Wor Mamay
- Yahya Khel - formerly part of Khairkot District
- Yusufkhel - formerly part of Khairkot District
- Ziruk

=== South West Afghanistan ===
==== Daykundi Province ====
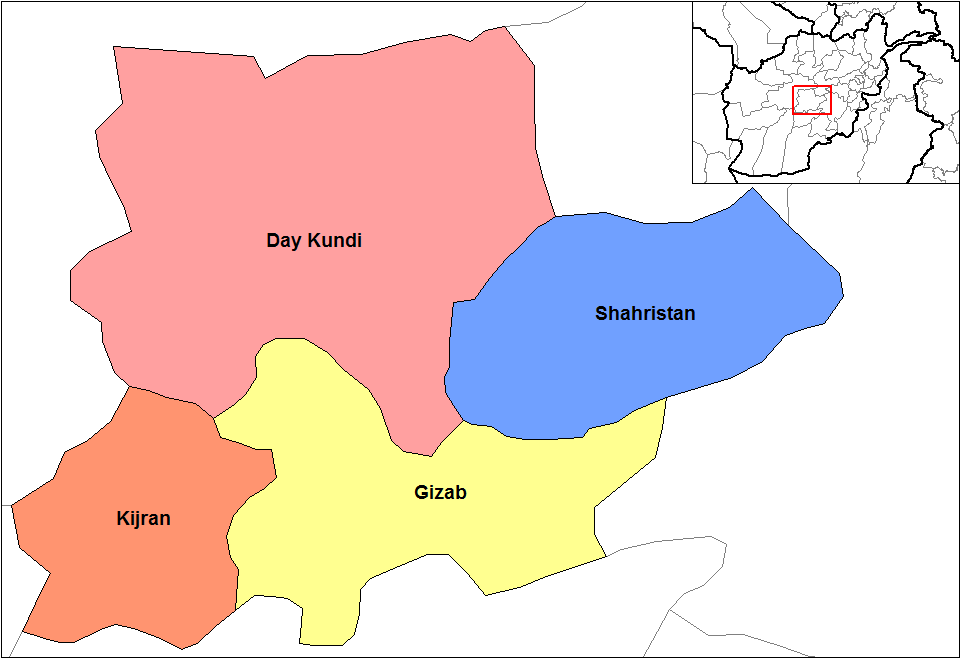
Districts of Daykundi

- Ishtarlay - part of the former Daykundi District; shifted from Uruzgan Province
- Kajran - shifted from Uruzgan Province
- Khadir - part of the former Daykundi District; shifted from Uruzgan Province
- Kiti - formerly part of Kajran District; shifted from Uruzgan Province
- Miramor - formerly part of Sharistan District; shifted from Uruzgan Province
- Nili - part of the former Daykundi District; shifted from Uruzgan Province
- Sangtakht - part of the former Daykundi District; shifted from Uruzgan Province
- Shahristan - shifted from Uruzgan Province
- Patoo - Shifted from Uruzgan Province

==== Helmand Province ====
Districts of Helmand

- Baghran
- Dishu
- Garmsir
- Grishk
- Kajaki
- Khanashin
- Lashkargah
- Majrah - formerly part of Nad Ali District
- Musa Qala
- Nad Ali
- Nawa-I-Barakzayi
- Nawzad
- Sangin
- Washir

==== Kandahar Province ====
Districts of Kandahar

- Arghandab
- Dand
- Arghistan
- Daman
- Ghorak
- Kandahar
- Khakrez
- Maruf
- Maiwand
- Miyan Nasheen - formerly part of Shah Wali Kot District
- Naish - shifted from Oruzgan Province
- Panjwaye
- Reg
- Shah Wali Kot
- Shorabak
- Spin Boldak
- Zhari - created from parts of Maiwand and Panjwaye Districts

==== Nimruz Province ====
Districts of Nimruz

- Chahar Burjak
- Chakhansur
- Kang
- Khash Rod
- Zaranj

==== Orūzgān Province ====
Districts of Orūzgān

- Chora
- Deh Rawood
- Gizab
- Khas Uruzgan
- Shahidi Hassas
- Tarinkot

==== Zabul Province ====
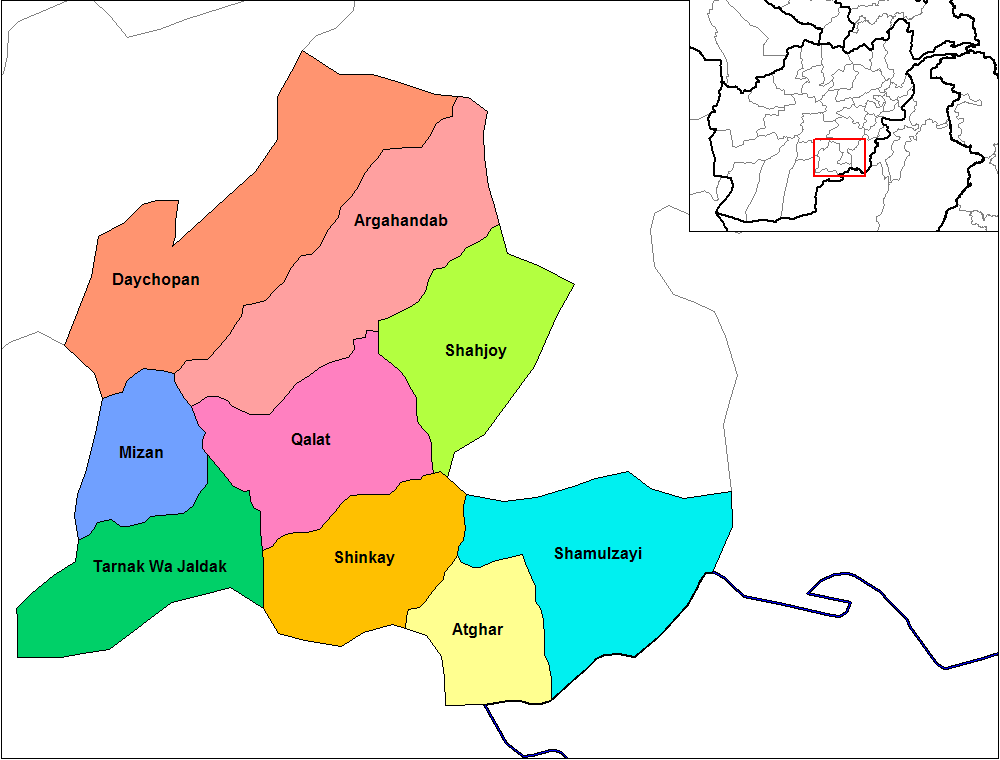
Districts of Zabūl

- Argahandab
- Atghar
- Daychopan
- Khaka-e-Afghan
- Mezana
- Naw Bahar - created from parts of Shamulzuyi and Shinkay Districts in Zabul Province .
- Qalat (technically only a municipality, not a district)
- Shah Joy
- Shamulzayi
- Shinkay
- Tarnak Wa Jaldak
- Suria

== See also ==
- List of splits and creations of districts in Afghanistan
- Valleys of Afghanistan
