= Du Abi =

Village in Nawur District, Ghazni Province, Afghanistan

Du Abi (also Doābī) (Dari: دوآبی) is a village located at 33.9033°N 67.8753°E with an altitude of 3091 m in the central part of Nawur District, Ghazni Province, Afghanistan. It is Nawur District's administrative center where the local council (or shura) sits. The name is also applied to include another village just south of Du Abi, on the same stream.

== See also ==
- Ghazni Province
