= Tatar (Hazara tribe) =

Afghani tribe

Tatar Hazara (Persian: هزارهٔ تاتار) is a tribe consisting mostly of Sunni and some Shia Hazaras in Afghanistan. They live mainly in northern parts of Afghanistan and Bamyan. They speak the Hazaragi dialect of Persian.

== See also ==
- List of Hazara tribes
