= Darayim District =

District in Badakhshan Province, Afghanistan

Darayim درایم
- District
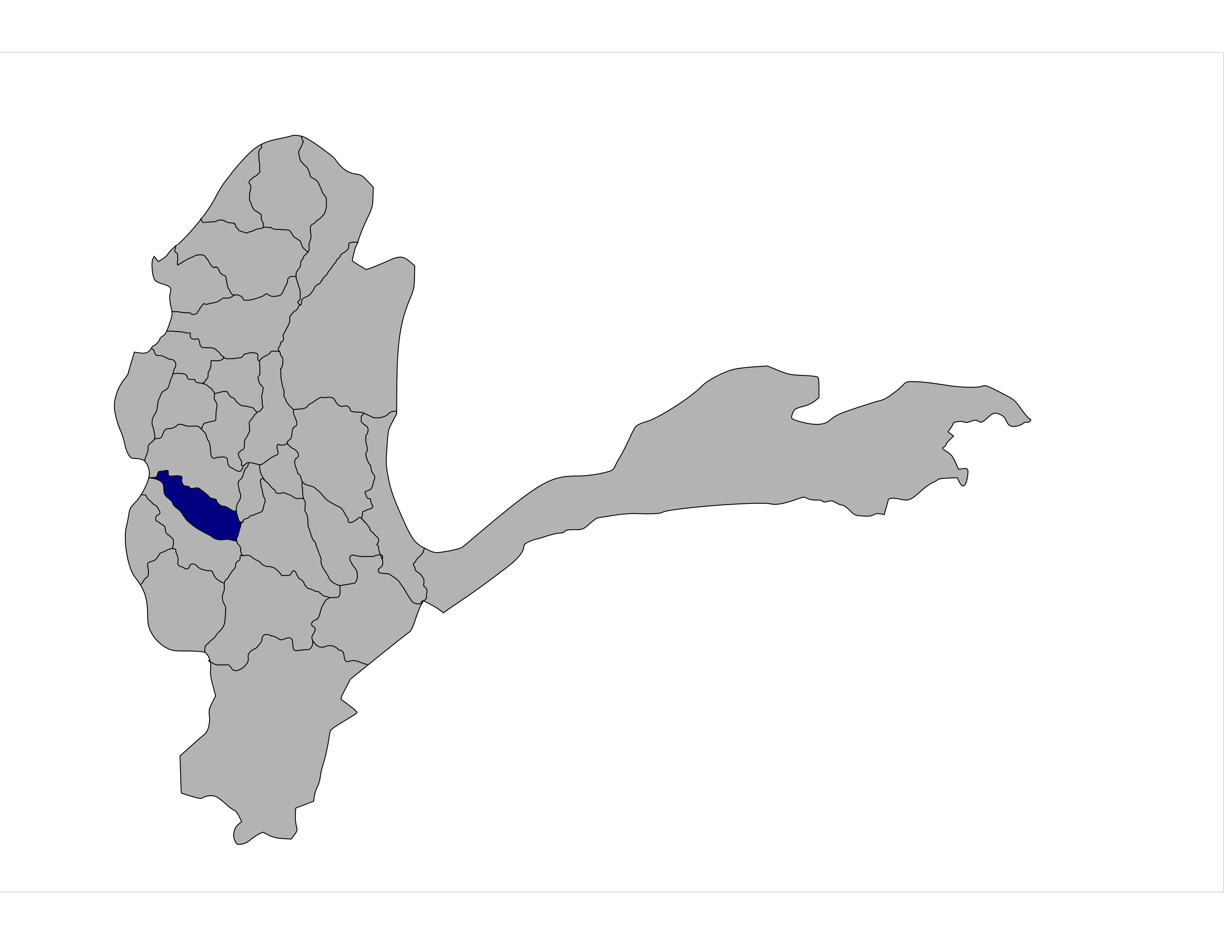
- Darayim District was formed within Fayzabad District
- Coordinates: 36°52′21″N 70°28′07″E
- Country: Afghanistan
- Province: Badakhshan

Government
  - Type: District council

Population
  - Estimate (2020): 69,618

Darayim (Dari: درایم) is a district in Badakhshan province, Afghanistan. It was created in 2005 from part of Fayzabad district and is home to an estimated 69,618 Population [2020] residents.
