= Ishkamish District =

- District
- Location of Ishkamish in Takhar Province
- Country: Afghanistan
- Province: Takhār Province

Population (2015)
  - District
  - Urban
- Time zone: UTC+4:30 (Afghanistan Standard Time)

Ishkamish District is a district of Takhar Province, Afghanistan.
