= Guzargahi Nur District =

Guzargahi Nur گذرگاه نور
- District
- Location within Afghanistan
- Coordinates: 36°13′48″N 69°34′12″E
- Country: Afghanistan
- Province: Baghlan

Population (2012)
  - Total: 9,900

Guzargahi Nur or Gozargah-e-Noor (Dari: گذرگاه نور) is a district in Baghlan province, Afghanistan. It was created in 2005 from part of Khost wa Firing District.

== 2014 Baghlan floods ==
In the afternoon of 06 June 2014 large flash floods devastated a number of villages in Guzargah-e-Nur district of Baghlan province, in North East Afghanistan. Reports from the Afghan National Disaster Management Authority (ANDMA) say 81 people died due to flood, 35 people were injured, seven seriously who were sent to the provincial hospital for further treatment ... Hundreds of houses have damaged or destroyed in Yahya, Jeryan, Zeh Wali, Dahte Khasa, Mir Khel, Yahood, Dahnae Gharoo, Deh Qandee, Koree Naw, Jar Ab, Dashte Khakaye Payeen, Khasaye Payeen villages in Guzargahi Nur district according to the Baghlan Provincial Governor and the ANDMA director. Affected people have been taken in by the local community in surrounding villages.
