= Farang Wa Gharu District =

Farang wa Gharu فرنگ و غارو
- District
- Location within Afghanistan
- Coordinates: 36°08′24″N 69°40′48″E
- Country: Afghanistan
- Province: Baghlan

Population (2012)
  - Total: 16,100

Farang wa Gharu or Firing wa Gharu (Dari: فرنگ و غارو) is a district in Baghlan province, Afghanistan. It was created in 2005 from part of Khost wa Fereng District.
