= Baharak District, Badakhshan =

Coordinates: 37°00′10″N 70°54′27″E

Baharak بهارک
- District
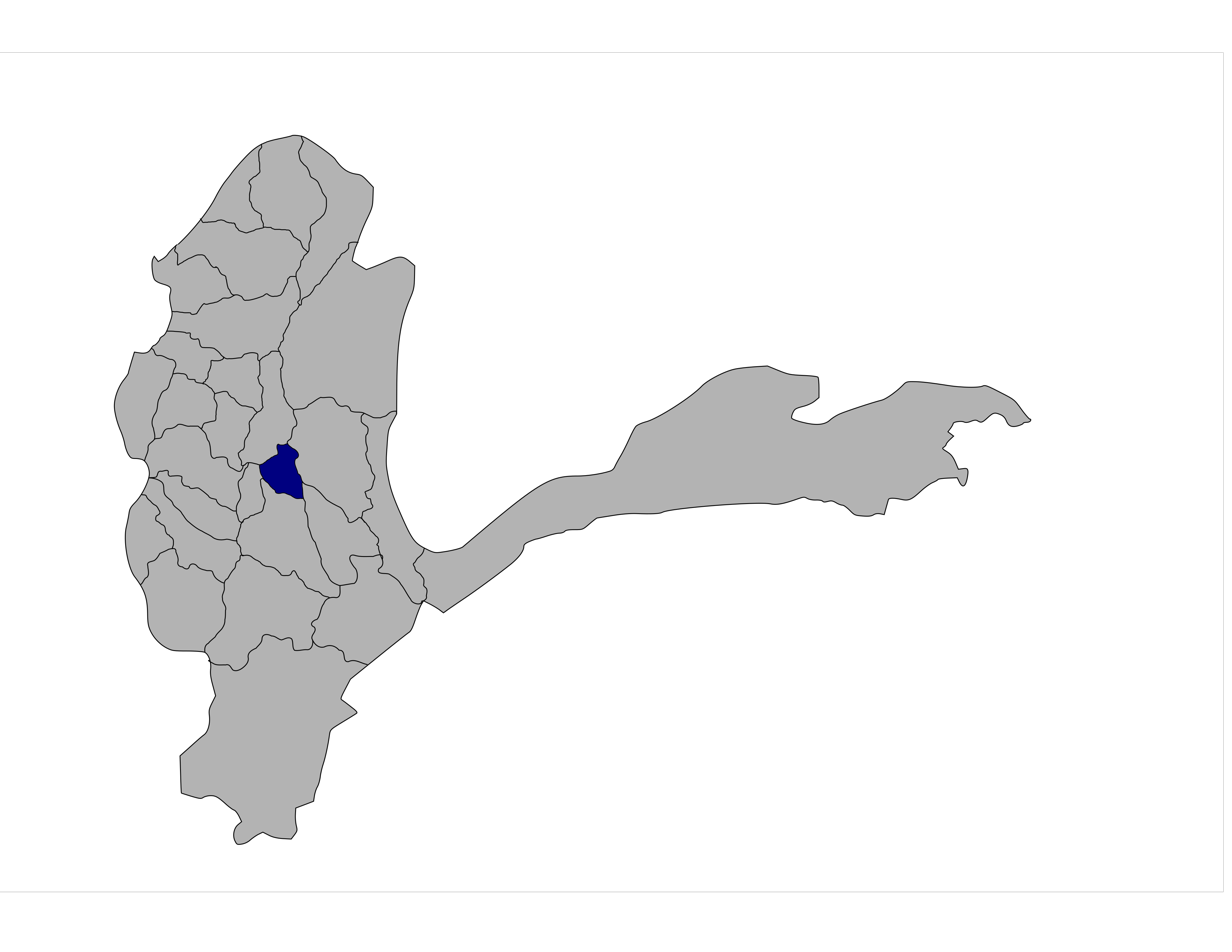
- Country: Afghanistan
- Province: Badakhshan
- Capital: Baharak

Government
  - Type: District council

Population
  - Total: 32,551

Baharak district (Dari: بهارک) is a district of Badakhshan province, Afghanistan, located about 30 km southeast of the provincial capital Fayzabad. The capital is the city of Baharak. The district is also called Baharistan.

Sir Aurel Stein says that Bahārak was the capital of Badakhshan before the present capital of Fayzabad.

The district has a population of 32,551.
