= Taloqan District =

Taluqan تالقان
- District
- Location of the district in Takhar Province
- Coordinates: 36°43′N 69°31′E
- Country: Afghanistan
- Province: Takhār
- Elevation: 876 m (2,874 ft)

Population (2015)
  - District: 258,219
  - Urban: 258,219
- Time zone: UTC+4:30 (Afghanistan Standard Time)

Taluqan, (Dari: تالقان), is a district of Takhar Province, in northeastern Afghanistan. The city has a total population of 258,219 (2015) and has 6 Police districts (nahias). The total land area of the city is 10,744 Hectares while there are a total of 28,691 dwellings.

Taluqan is a trading and transit hub in northern Afghanistan. Although agriculture is the majority of land (55%), there are also 28,691 residential houses. Almost half the residential dwellings are concentrated in District 6. The Khanabad River flows through Taluqan and accounts for 7% of total land use.

== See also ==
- Taloqan
- Districts of Afghanistan
