= List of bridges in Kunar Province =

As of the opening of the Guryak Truck Bridge in February 2009 there were three bridges crossing the Kunar River in Kunar Province. The Konar Provincial Reconstruction Team is working on four additional new bridges. The bridges are designed to last sixty years. According to Lieutenant Neil Myers USN, of the Kunar Provincial Reconstruction Team the popularity of the bridges stopped insurgents from attacking the bridges.

Bridges in Konar Province
completed	name	location	notes
	Nawabad Bridge	Nawabad	Built prior to the 2001 invasion.; Crosses the Kunar River.; Road approaches paved in 2009.
		Asmar	Built prior to the 2001 invasion.; Crosses the Kunar River.; The 1911 edition of the Encyclopædia Britannica says a bridge spanned the river at Asmar.
	Senji Bridge		
2006-09-18	Pesh Bridge	FOB Ghazni	Completed in just one month.
2008-02-00	Matin Bridge	Pesh valley	Old bridge was washed away in a flood in 2007.
2009-02-17	Guryak Truck Bridge	Chapadara district	
2009-x-x	Khas Konar Truck Bridge	Khas Konar	
2009-x-x	Marawara Truck Bridge	Marawara District	
2009-x-x	Bar Sholtan Truck Bridge	Shigal District	
2009-x-x	Saw Truck Bridge	Gaziabad District	
