= Asadabad District =

District of Kunar, Afghanistan

Coordinates: 34°52′06″N 71°07′48″E

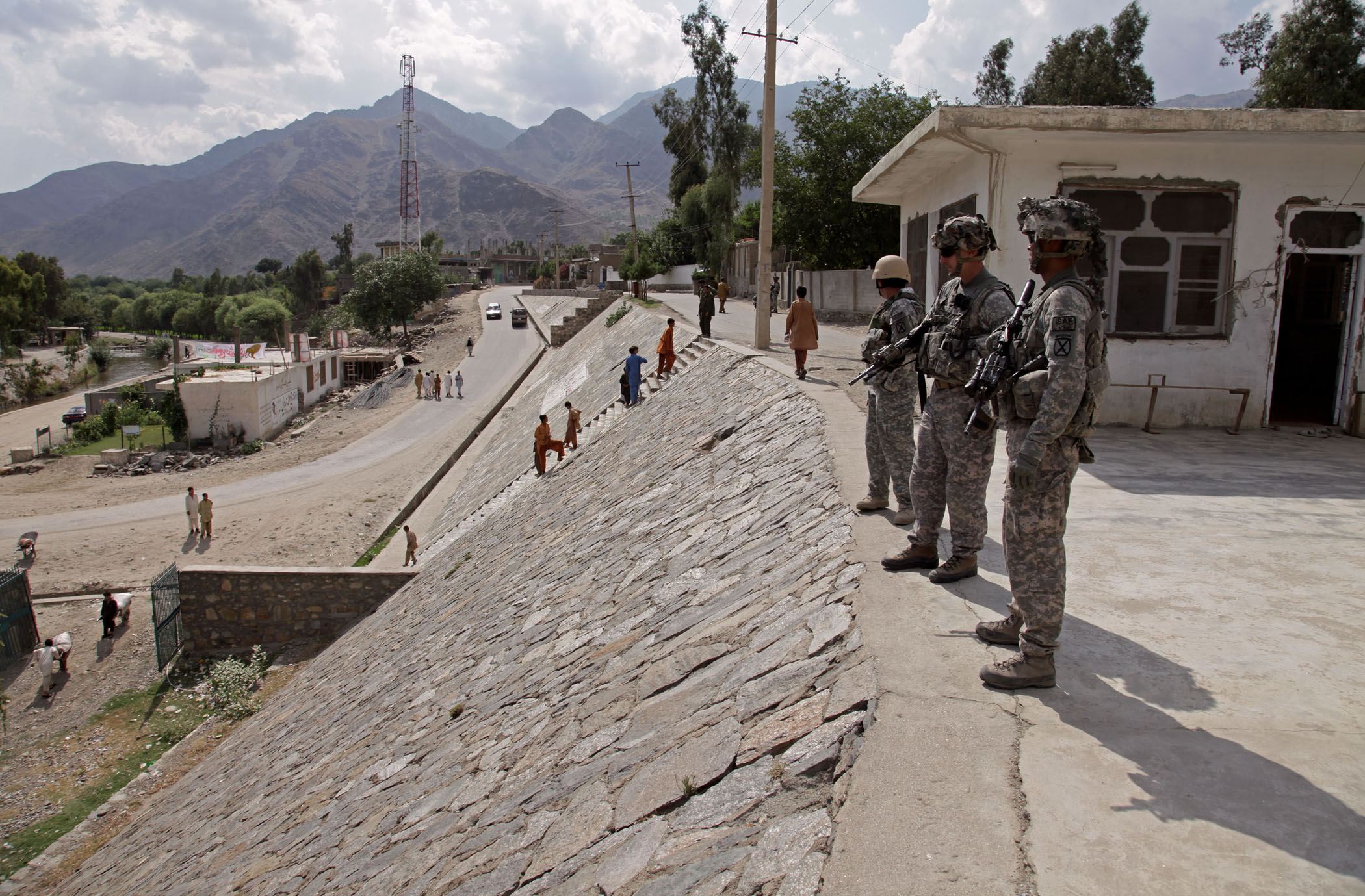
U.S. soldiers from the 10th Mountain Division providing security in Asadabad

Asadabad district (Pashto: اسد اباد) is one of 15 districts in the Kunar Province of Afghanistan. It includes the city of Asadabad - the district center, close the Kunar River. It is situated in the central part of the province. It has 12 big and small villages, which are surrounded by mountains so there is not enough land for farming.

== Borders ==
Before June 2004, Asadabad District bordered Dara-I-Pech District and Nuristan Province to the west, Bar Kunar, Dangam, Marawara and Sirkanay districts to the east and Narang wa Badil district to the south.

As of the 2004 Afghanistan administrative reorganization, Wata Pur District was spun off from Asadabad District, all of northeastern Asadabad District went to Dangam District and a small piece of eastern Narang District became western Asadabad District. The result was that Asadabad District borders on:

- Wata Pur District to the northwest,
- Dangam District to the northeast,
- Marawara District to the east and southeast,
- Sarkani District to the south, and
- Narang District to the west.

== Demographics ==
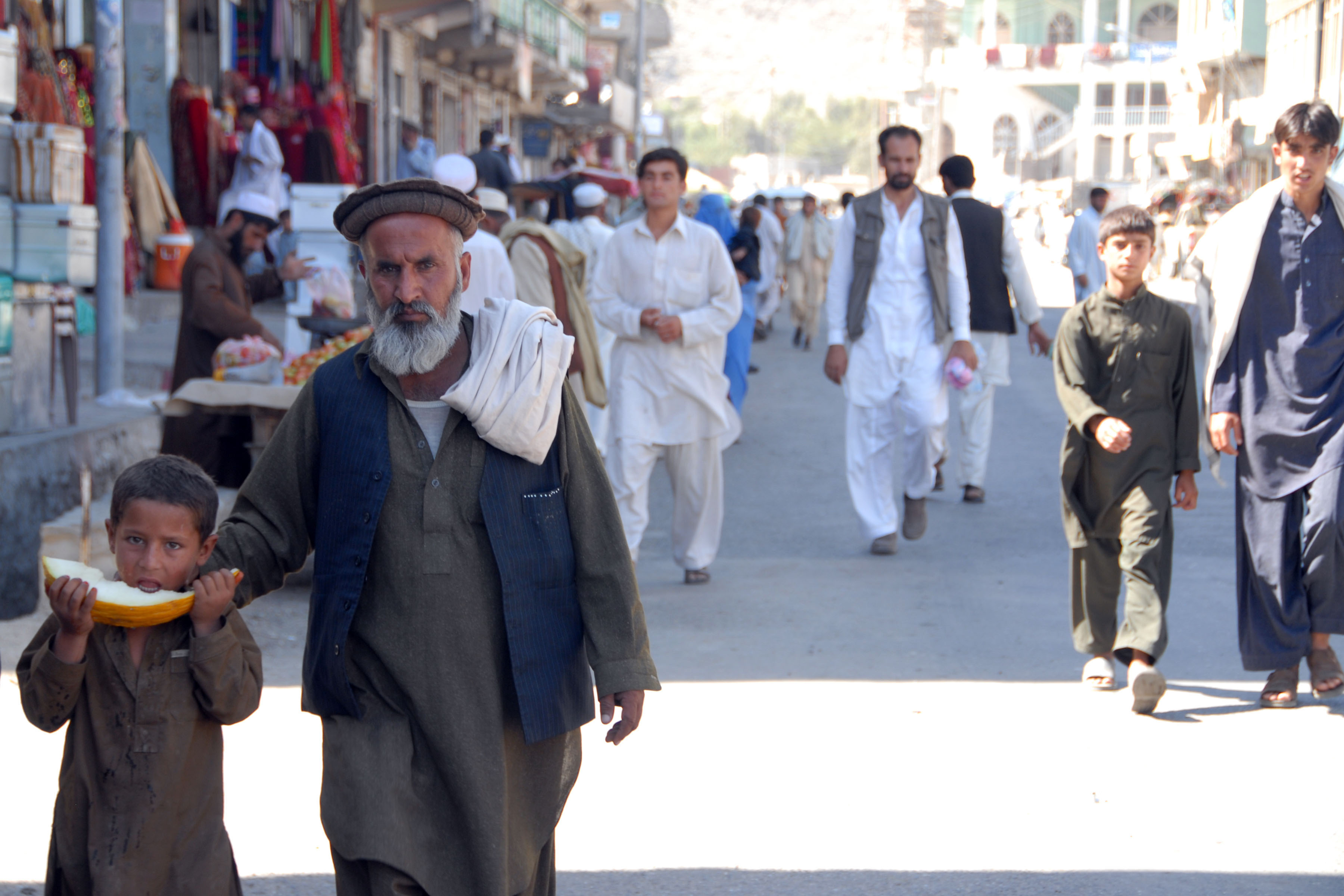
An Afghan father and his child walk down the street from the local farmers market in Asadabad, (September 2009).

The population of the district was reported in 2002 as 52,472, all of which are ethnic Pashtuns.

By the end of the Soviet–Afghan War in 1989, half of the houses in the district had been destroyed and nearly half of the population was living as refugees in Pakistan.

== Water ==
The district has serious issues with flooding, which destroys large amounts of agricultural land.

== Commerce ==
As of 2002, 75% of the population was landless, with 25% involved in agriculture, 20% laboring in the city, and the remained involved in either cutting lumber or expatriated to Pakistan and Iran for work.

== Agriculture ==
=== Crops ===
Asadabad district produces wheat, rice, sugarcane and vegetable.

=== Livestock ===
Common livestock include goats, cows, sheep and buffalos, with oxen used for labor.

== Human rights ==
=== De-mining ===
By 2002, all of the district except Sakai and Gira villages had been de-mined by MDC.

== Localities ==
- Asadabad
- Shegai
