= Ghaziabad District, Kunar =

District of Kunar, Afghanistan

Ghaziabad District (Pashto: غازی اباد) is in the northern part of Kunar Province, Afghanistan. It was created in 2004 from the northern part of Bar Kunar District. It was named after the Khan of Ghaziabad, Amir Muhammad Ghazi Khan Shaheed. Its population is 7,500 (2004).

The district center is the village of Ghaziabad (34.7158°N 70.7592°E) at 1,271 metres (4,170 ft) altitude. The area is mountainous and there is little arable land. Many of its residents work in Pakistan.

== Boundaries ==
Ghaziabad District borders on:

- Nuristan Province to the northwest and north
- Naray District to the east
- Bar Kunar District to the south
- Dangam District to the west
