= Mullah Dadullah =

Mullah Dadullah may refer to:

- Mullah Dadullah (c. 1966–2007), Afghan Taliban leader
- Mullah Dadullah (Pakistani Taliban) (died 2012), Pakistani Taliban leader
