= Rasul Amin =

Abdul Rasul Amin
- رسول امين
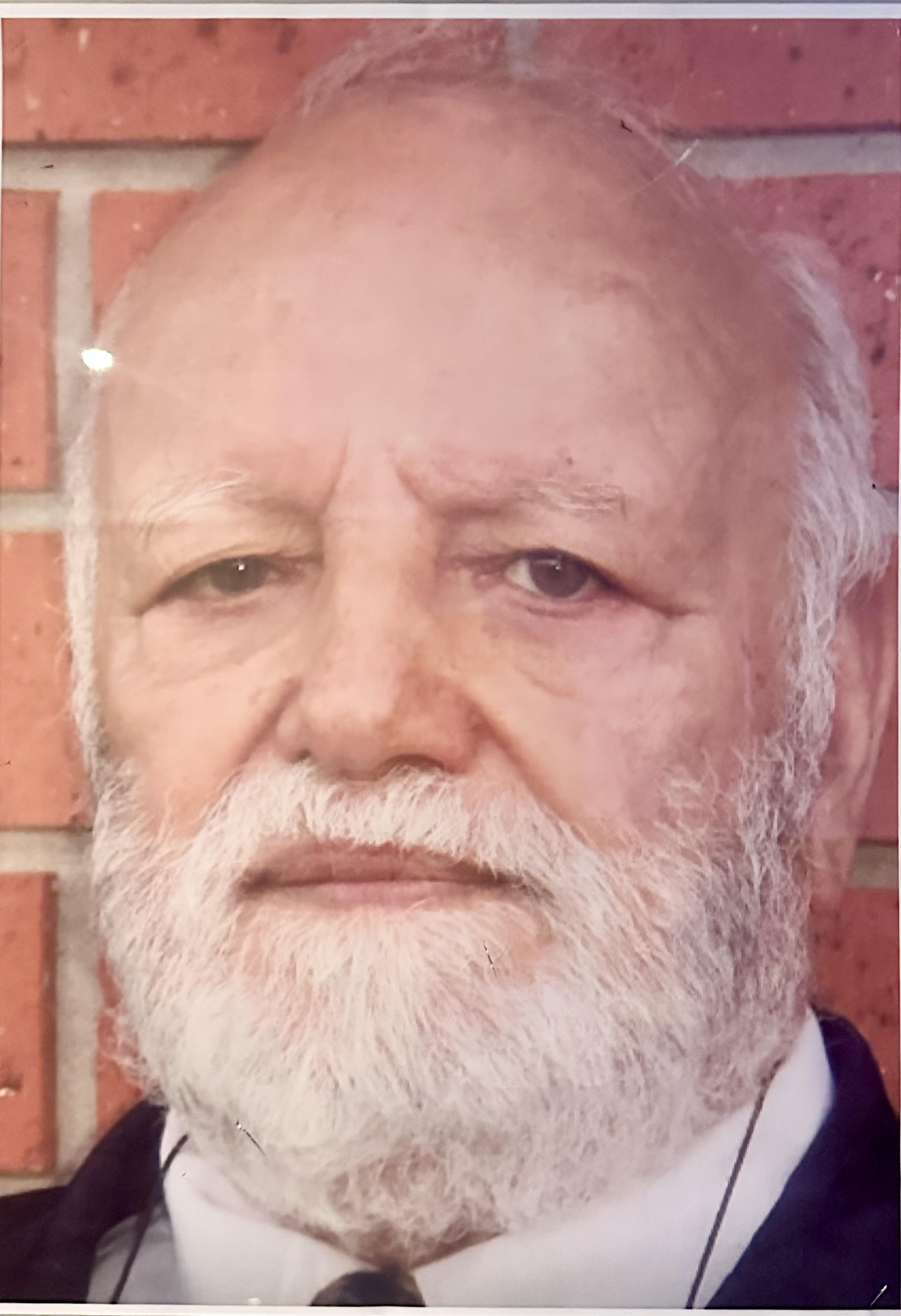
- Born: Abdul Rasul Amin; 10 May 1939; Wata Pur District, Kunar Province, Kingdom of Afghanistan
- Died: 31 October 2009 (aged 70); Melbourne, Australia
- Resting place: Kerala, Kunar
- Other name: Amin
- Citizenship: Afghan/Australian
- Education: MA Political Science 1966 Peshawar University
- Occupations: Minister of Education, Professor, Politician, Scholar, Author, Philosopher.
- Years active: 1966-2009
- Employer(s): Lecturer Kabul University, English and political science. Director of Writers Union of Free Afghanistan (WUFA) 1985-2002. Ministry of Education of Afghanistan, Minister of Education 2001-2002. Director of Afghanistan Study Centre, Kabul 2002-2009.
- Spouse: Benazir Amin
- Awards: Best Debater, Scholar of the Year in South Asia, General Secreatary of Khyber Union

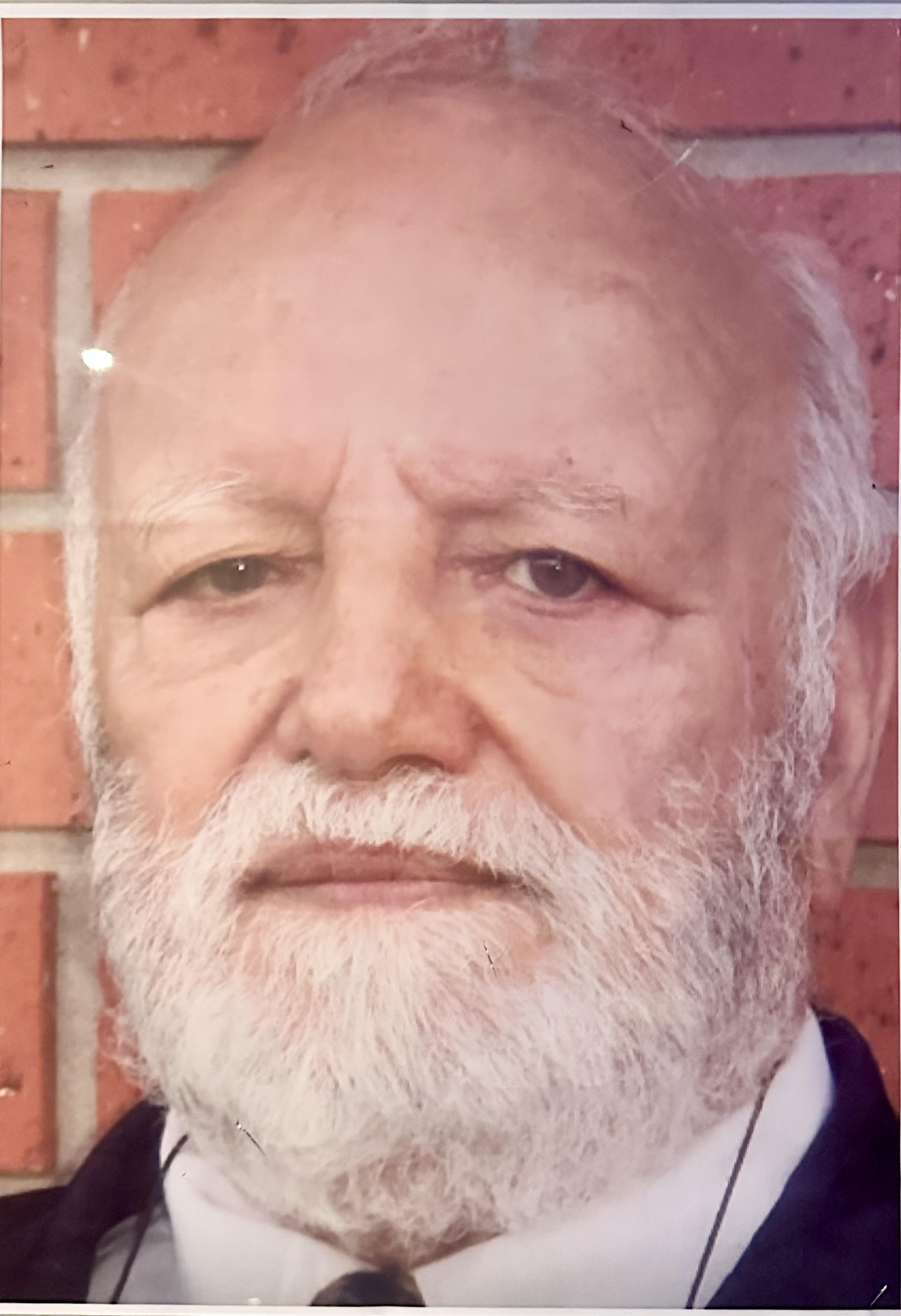
Prof.Abdul Rasul Amin Former Education Minister of Afghanistan 2002

Abdul Rasul Amin (Pashto: رسول امين; 10 May 1939 – 31 October 2009) was an Afghan politician, lexicographer, academic, writer, and former education minister.

== Early life and academic life ==
Rasul Amin was born on 10 May 1939 in a culturally diverse area, Wata Pur District of eastern Kunar Province. Rasul Amin was son of a Ghazi Mohammad Amin Khan of Mamond tribe. Rasul Amin Father was a nephew of Ghazi Mir Zaman Khan. He was raised as an orphan because his mother died when he was 5 years old. His father, Ghazi Mohammad Amin Khan participated in the uprising with the leading attorney general, Ghazi Mir Zaman Khan in 1947. Due to the bad government, he was forced to depart with Ghazi Mir Zaman Khan to Herat and Mazar-e Sharif. Rasul Amin completed his primary education in Kunar.

In 1955, he went to Peshawar, Pakistan, where he wanted to pursue further more studies and gather his English and Urdu languages. Overall he knew how to speak 4 languages, including Pushto and Dari. After learning the two languages, he got admitted at Forward College and graduated in 1960. In 1960, he was admitted to Islamia College Peshawar, Pakistan. He was elected as a General-Secretary of the Khyber Union, (students’ union), in 1962, an unprecedented honour for an Afghan student. In 1963, he was voted the best debater at college. He received a BA in 1964 and a double master's degree in Sociology, English and Political Science in 1966.

== Soviet resistance ==
From 1980 to 1985 he worked with the National Islamic Front of Pir Sayed Ahmad Gillani in Peshawar. 1990s, he worked with the Rome Group that was established by the former King, Muhammad Zaher Shah. He initially worked with the Afghan intellectual Professor Seyyed Bahauddin Majrooh at the Afghanistan Information Centre (AIC). The AIC became a mouthpiece of liberal Afghan intellectuals linked to the resistance but drew the wrath of the fundamentalist factions. Prof. Majrooh was assassinated in Peshawar in 1988 after the AIC had published the results of a poll among Afghan refugees that showed that the former King was the most popular Afghan politician, way ahead of the mujahedin leaders. On 21 March 1985, Rasul established the Organization Writers Union of Free Afghanistan, which, as the AIC, was supported by the Konrad Adenauer Foundation (Germany), USIS, the Asia Foundation (USA), and the Royal Ministry for Foreign Affairs (Denmark). Like the AIC, it became an institution that – amongst other activities – collected documents on the Afghan resistance, one of the few to do so.

== Civil war ==
In 1990 Amin warned, "If the United States cuts or reduces its aid to the Afghan cause, it will be replaced by the Arabs. Afghanistan would not be at peace for a long time". Amin's prediction came true when in the 1990s the US and the Soviets left a power vacuum and a civil war broke out where the warring factions were all supported by one of Afghanistan's neighbouring countries. At that time he always kept an automatic rifle behind his chair and a pistol on his desk. In 1996 he said about that Afghan Civil War "This is not truly an Afghan fight. Only a few people who want power sell themselves to foreigners."

== Post-Taliban Afghanistan ==
Rasul Amin also played an important role in Rome Conference held in 2001 under the supervision of former king Mohammad Zahir Shah. After the fall of the Taliban regime, Prof. Amin returned to Afghanistan. At the Bonn conference, he was appointed Minister of Education in the Interim Administration of Afghanistan, representing the Rome Group. When the new school year was opened in March 2002, he said: "We have decided to project a new image of ourselves. We have to forget the past if we want to rebuild this country". During his ministry he visited Japan and met with Emperor of Japan.

Amin organised peace conferences, seminars and workshops for Afghanistan. The most famous seminar was in Pearl Continental, Peshawar, Pakistan during 1991, whose chief guest and chair person was Prime Minister, Benazir Bhutto. American scholar on Afghanistan Louis Dupree and his wife, Nancy Hatch Dupree, were close friends of Amin.

In 2001, Amin became the first Education Minister of Afghanistan. He stated that Afghan girls should be given priority in their education and said, "there was a big task to rebuild his homeland (Afghanistan) education system after 24 years of unrest". That was his "to do" list in his early days as Afghanistan education minister. He was so committed to fulfil his duties. He resigned in 2002. He decided to devote himself fully to the intellectual regeneration of Afghanistan and to Afghan-Pak friendship. The 2004 article "Resolving the Afghan-Pakistan Border Question" is one of many articles by him.

Rasul Amin established the Afghanistan Study Centre in Kabul as the successor of the Writers Union of Free Afghanistan (WUFA) which was Established in 1985 in Peshawar Pakistan. WUFA orgianized Many of International Seminars Related to the Freedom of Afghanistan, International Politicians, Scholars and writers were invited to these Seminars from around the Globe.The founder also became its director and the editor of the Journal of Afghanistan Studies quarterly. Prof.Rasul Amin served as the Minister of Education from 2001 to 2002 in the interim Transitional Administration under President Hamid Karzai. While he was Minister of Education, he looked after orphan homes, schools, etc.

Rasul Amin travelled all around the world, including to America, Denmark, Switzerland, Iran, Poland, Egypt, India, Germany, France, Rome, the United Kingdom, Africa, Japan, Tajikistan, and Australia. While he was in Egypt, he met with Anwar Sadat. His final destination and favourite place was Melbourne, Australia, where he settled with all of his family members.

Rasul Amin died on 31 October 2009 at 6 AM in Melbourne, Australia from pancreatic cancer. He wanted to be buried next to Sayyed Jamaluddin Afghani's grave at Kabul University, but with no permission from the Government of the Islamic Republic of Afghanistan, he was buried in Kerala, Kunar with a State Funeral from the Government of Afghanistan.
