= COP Badel =

COP Badel is a small combat outpost created near the village of Badel in the Narang District of Kunar Province, Afghanistan. The small outpost was established in early 2009 by D company, 1st Battalion, 32nd Infantry Regiment, 3 BCT, 10th Mountain Division and an Embedded Training Team (ETT 2–7) of Marines from 3D Marine Division on a small piece of high ground that locals called Badel Mountain.

The COP is considered to be on low ground compared to the mountains to the north. It was placed at the opening of the Narang Valley, which extends north towards the Shuryak and Korengal Valleys. COP Badel is always manned by one US Infantry Platoon, U.S. Marines, and at least a squad of ANA at any given time. The outpost was attacked regularly with AK47's, PKM, RPG, Diska, recoilless rifles, ZPU, and 82mm mortars.
