= Guryak Truck Bridge =

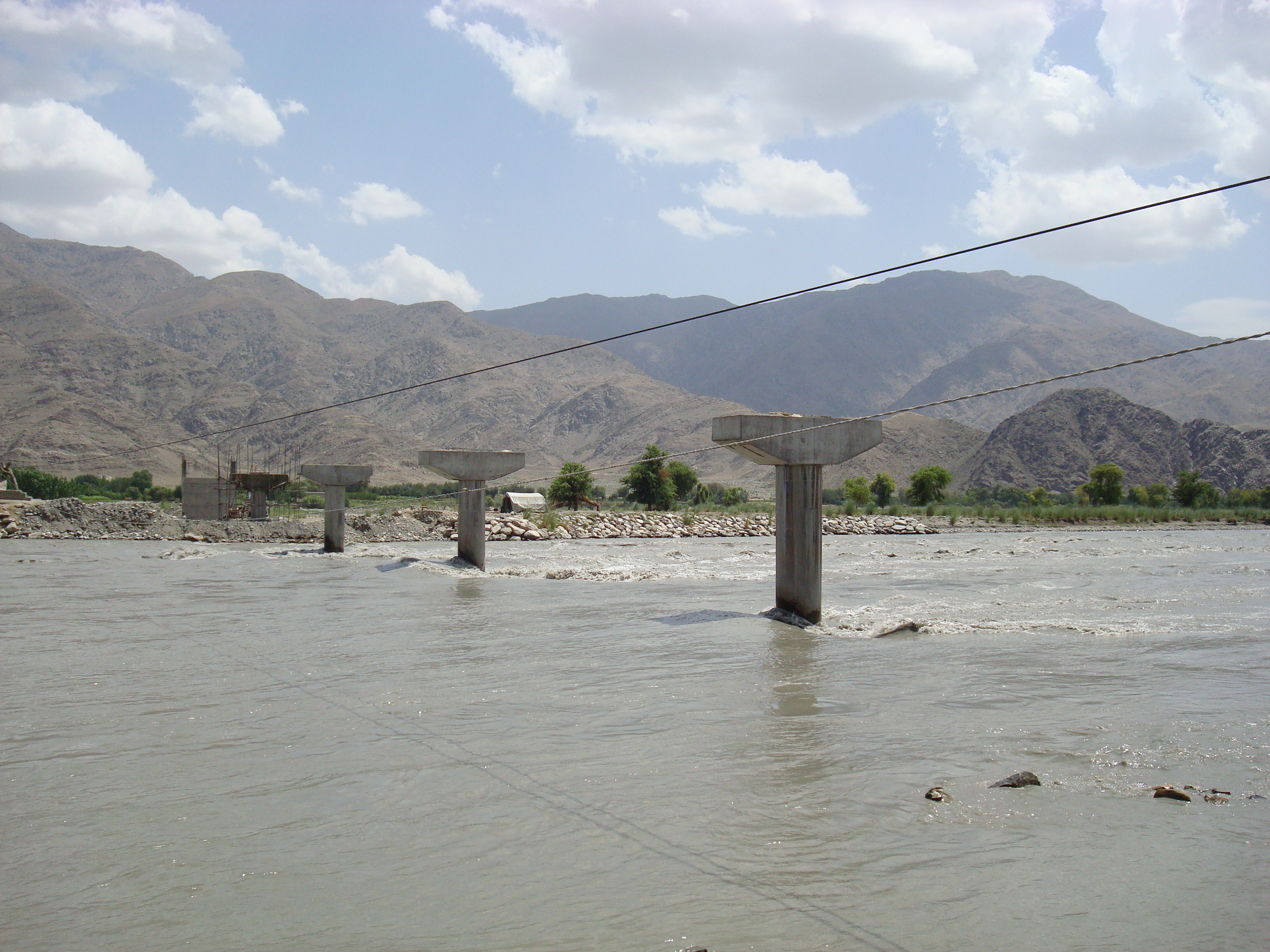
The Guryak bridge, when under construction.

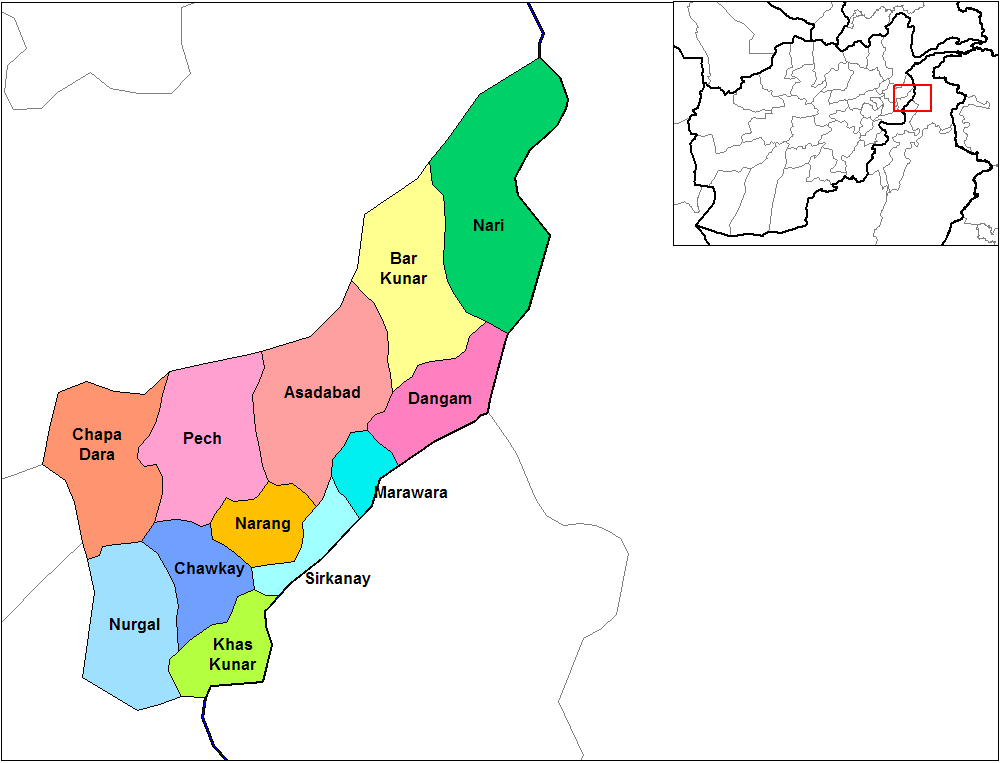
Districts of Konar

The Guryak truck bridge (Pashto: ګوریاک) is a bridge connecting the districts of Nurgal and Khas Kunar in Konar Province, Afghanistan. The 280-metre-long (920 ft) bridge was opened on February 17, 2009. The bridge cost $1.7 million.

Construction was overseen by the Konar Provincial Reconstruction Team. Construction was completed on time and on budget by the Abdul Haq Foundation.
