= Maulawi Dadullah =

Maulawi Dadullah may refer to:

- Maulawi Dadullah (c. 1966–2007), Afghan Taliban leader
- Maulawi Dadullah (Pakistani Taliban) (c. 1965–2012), Pakistani Taliban leader
