= Marawara =

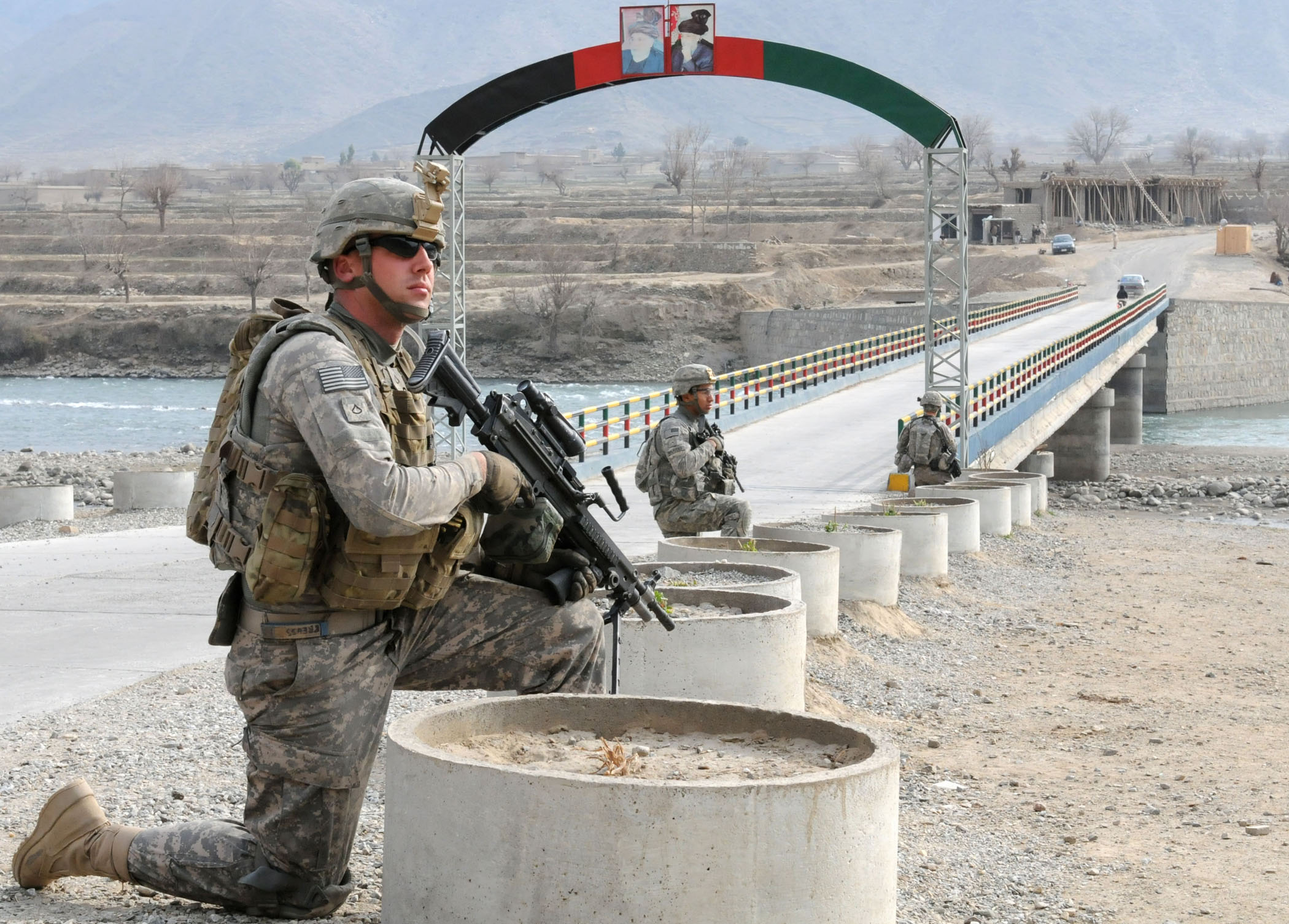
- U.S. soldiers providing security next to the Marawara Bridge (January 2010)

- Location in Afghanistan
- Coordinates: 34°53′29″N 71°10′11″E
- Country: Afghanistan
- Province: Kunar Province
- District: Marawara District
- Elevation: 2,999 ft (914 m)
- Time zone: UTC+4:30

Marawara (Pashto: ماراوره) (Marah Warah) is a village and the center of Marawara district, Kunar Province, Afghanistan. It is located at 34.8914°N 71.1808°E at 914 m altitude in a river valley in the most western end of the district.
