= Chapa Dara =

Chapa Dara چپه دره
- Village
- Location in Afghanistan
- Coordinates: 34°58′58″N 70°45′58″E
- Country: Afghanistan
- Province: Kunar
- District: Chapa Dara
- Time zone: UTC+4:30

Chapa Dara (Pashto: چپه دره) is the capital of Chapa Dara District in Kunar Province, Afghanistan.

== History ==
In April 2019, it was reported that Chapa Dara had become a refuge for 2,549 families fleeing an advance of the local chapter of the self-styled Islamic State. These families became dependent on aid by the World Food Programme and the United States Agency for International Development.
