= N2KL =

US Army designation for area in eastern Afghanistan

- Afghan "N2KL" provinces Nangarhar, Nuristan, Kunar and Langhman highlighted. Coordinates 35.0°N 71.2°E

N2KL was the designation used by the United States and Coalition Forces for an area in Regional Command East comprising four eastern provinces of Afghanistan: Nangarhar, Nuristan, Kunar, and Laghman. These provinces border Pakistan, a fact important in the infiltration of Afghanistan from Pakistan and of Pakistan from Afghanistan and smuggling of weapons, narcotics, lumber, copper, gemstones, marble, vehicles, and electronic products, as well as ordinary consumer goods. Furthermore, the area is of strategic significance due to its natural resources, including water, agriculture, timber, and gems.

Throughout the War in Afghanistan, the area saw steady levels of Taliban insurgency, with the Islamic State's Khorasan Province also waging an insurgency in this area, causing numerous terrorist attacks. As of 2017, of the 14 Medals of Honor awarded to US soldiers for the war in Afghanistan, 12 have been awarded for actions in these four provinces.
