= Shaigal District =

Afghanistan District

Shegal District (Pashto: شیګل ولسوالي) was split from Chapa Dara District in Kunar Province, Afghanistan and the population is 13,351 (2019).

Waheedullah Sabawoon and late Kashmir Khan, two of the famous politicians of Afghanistan, belonging to this district. Wall nut, Malt, date plum and plum are the famous fruits while, rice, wheat, sugarcane, corns and cotton are the main crops cultivated in the district. The Kunar river is separating Shugal from Shultan while both areas are connected by Shultan bridge. Since last couple of years, the Shultan separated and has become a district. It has a long border with neighbor Pakistan. Villages in Shegal district include Dag-e-Ser, Shangurgul, Lachay, Monay, Helalzo, Naret, Chaqore, and more. In Shegal District 80% of males and 30% of females are educated. A major tribe of the district are the Shinwari.
