= Dadullah (Pakistani Taliban) =

Pakistani Taliban leader

- Mullah Dadullah
- Born: Jamal Said c. 1965
- Died: 24 August 2012 (46-47); Shaigal Aw Shiltan District, Afghanistan
- Cause of death: NATO airstrike

Jamal Said (c. 1965 - 24 August 2012) better known by the nom de guerre Mullah Dadullah and also Maulana Mohammad Jamal, was a senior member of the Pakistani Taliban. He was self-proclaimed Taliban leader in Pakistan's northern Bajaur Agency. He was killed in a NATO airstrike in the Shigal wa Sheltan District of Afghanistan's neighbouring Kunar Province on 24 August 2012. His deputy and ten Taliban fighters were also killed in the strike.

Born in Khar, Bajaur, he received his religious education in Panjpir and was a former prayer leader before he became a Taliban commander. It was reported by AP that Dadullah became leader of the group after Bajur's former Pakistani Taliban leader, Maulvi Faqir Mohammed, fled to Afghanistan to avoid Pakistani army operations. He was succeeded by Maulana Abu Bakr.
