= Marawara District =

District of Kunar Province, Afghanistan

Coordinates: 34.8616°N 71.2288°E

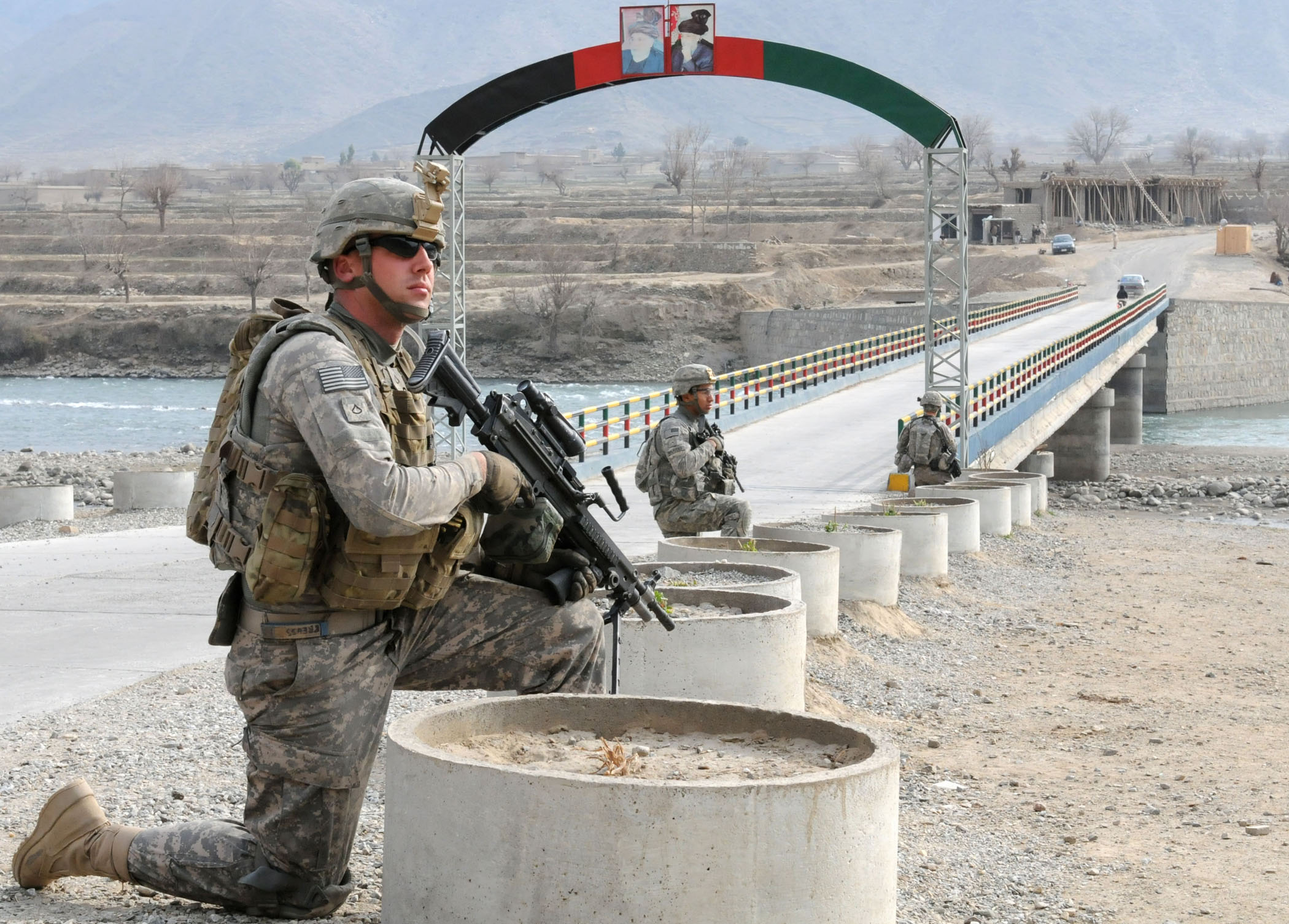
U.S. soldiers providing security next to the Monawara Bridge (January 2010)

Marawara or Manawara District (Pashto: منوره ولسوالۍ) is one of the 15 districts in Kunar Province, Afghanistan. The name Marawara is its historical name but the Taliban regime has changed it to Manawara, both in their first term as well as in their current government. The main villages are Marawara, Loyi Bachi, Kamkai Bachi, Lahor dag, Hisara, Daridam, Chinar, Petaw, Tarkho obo, Karwauro, Ajabshagai and Baraolo. It borders Sirkanay District to the west, Asadabad District to the north-west across Kunar river, Shultan district to the north-east and the Durand Line to the east. Monawara's population is not exactly known but government figures estimate it to be around 22,270 people, all of them being ethnic Pashtuns. Monawara village is the center of the district and is located in its westernmost part.

Besides being geographically the nearest district to the provincial capital Assadabad, the district has been remain poorly connected - physically, politically and economically - to the provincial and central movements due to several obvious reasons, including the low level of education, the lake of proper infrastructures - roads and bridges - and the perceived unwillingness of the relevant tribal leaders to connect the resident to their central governments.

Historically, the residents and community elders of the district have played very less or negligible role in the politics, both on provincial and national levels. In recent decades, however, Marawara has produced several prominent figures in government, security and diplomacy, reflecting a gradual increase in educational attainment and political engagement. Notable individualas include: Mawlawi Hamdullah Mamundzai (former religious affairs minister), General Siraj Bajauri (military figure), Haji Dost Mohammad Khan (provincial director tribal affairs), Dr. Farid Mamondzai (NS advisor and diplomate) and Haji Alem Gul (member provincial assembly).

The dominant tribe in the district is the Pashtun Mamund/Mamond sub-clan of Tarkalani tribe. Historically being an independent tribe, most of the disputes are solved by informal Jirga system and the governments have always respected this dispute resolution mechanism. The district has two big valleys, known as Hiduraaj Dara connected to Bajaur through Ghakhi Pass and Bachi Dara. The mountainous terrain and the lack of arable land and irrigation systems is the main problem in this area. Monawara is also one of the few strategic districts in terms of its unique location and high mountainous terrains connecting Kunar to Pakistan via the Durand Line.

== See also ==
- Districts of Afghanistan
