= Nur Gal =

Nurgal
- Location in Afghanistan
- Coordinates: 34°36′39″N 70°45′25″E
- Country: Afghanistan
- Province: Kunar Province
- District: Nurgal district
- Elevation: 2,083 ft (635 m)
- Time zone: UTC+4:30

Nurgal (Pashto: نورګل) or Nur Gal is the center of Nurgal district, in the Kunar Province of Afghanistan. It is located at 34.6108°N 70.7569°E at 635 m altitude in the valley of the Kunar River.
