= Nurgal District =

Nurgal
- District
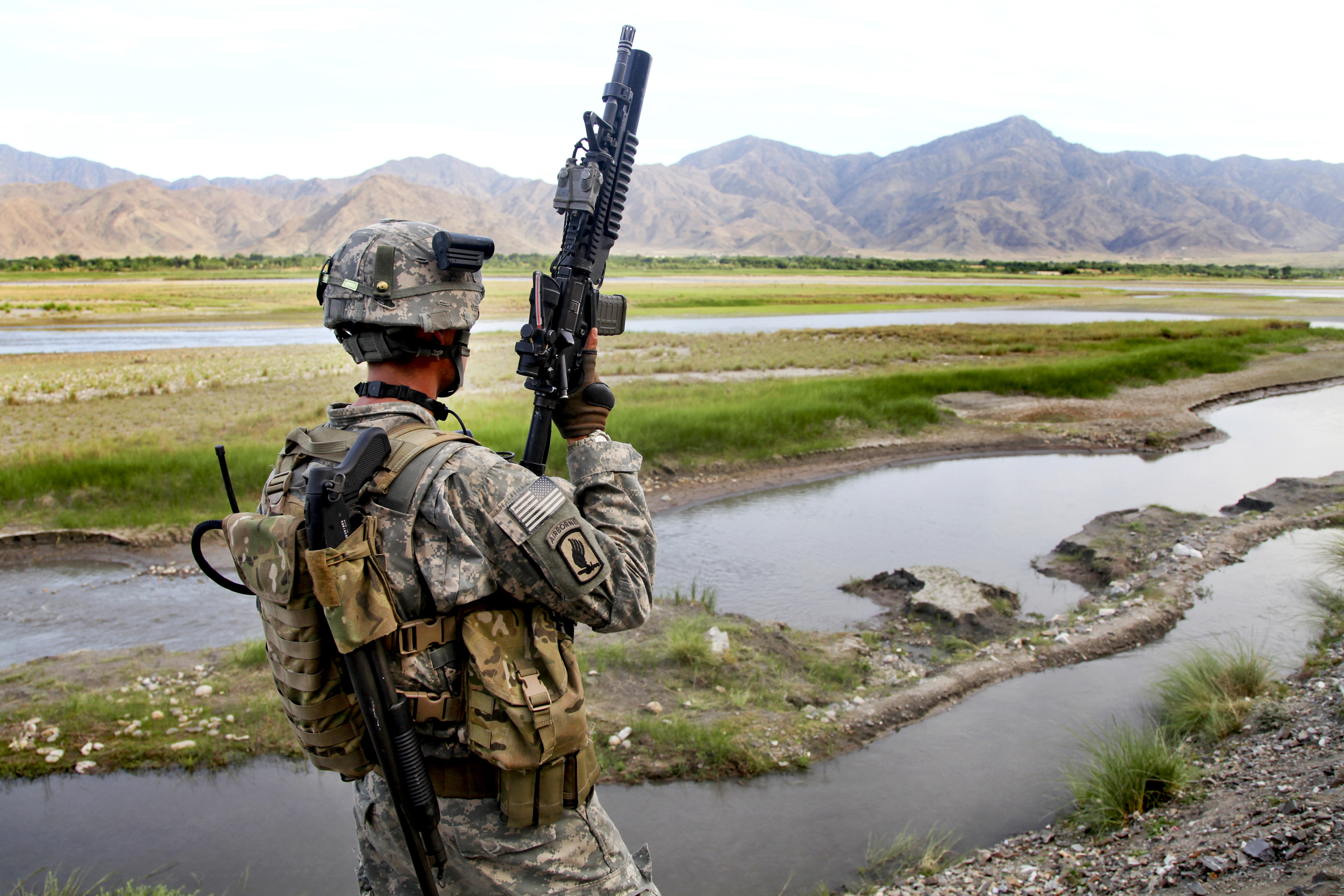

- Location within Afghanistan
- Coordinates: 34.700000°N 70.750000°E
- Country: Afghanistan
- Province: Kunar
- Capital: Nurgal

Population (2006)
  - Rural: ~28,000
- Time zone: UTC+4:30

Nurgal (Pashto: نورګل) is a district is in the western part of Kunar Province in Afghanistan, 45 kilometres (28 mi) west of the town of Asadabad, near the city of Jalalabad. It borders Nangarhar Province to the west and south, Chapa Dara district to the north and Chawkay and Khas Kunar districts to the east.

The population of Nurgal district is approximately 28,000 (2006). In 2002, it was wholly populated by Pashtuns. The district center is the village of Nurgal, located in the south, in the valley of the Kunar river. Approximately 70% of the houses were destroyed during the Soviet–Afghan War. The area is mostly mountainous and it lacks in irrigation necessary for farming. Many residents look for work abroad, due to the lack of resources, health care, and education.

== See also ==
- Districts of Afghanistan
