= Bar Kunar District =

District of Kunar, Afghanistan

Bar Kunar District (Pashto: بر کونړ) is situated in the northeastern part of Kunar Province, Afghanistan. It borders Asadabad district to the southwest, Nuristan Province to the northwest, Nari district to the northeast and Dangam district to the southeast. The population is 19,500 (2006) - all Pashtun. The district center is the village of Asmãr (35.0339°N 71.3583°E) at 983 m elevation in a river valley, located in the most southern part of the district.
The district is mountainous and the arable land is not enough and people are poor. It is said that the fight against the Soviet Army started in this district.
