= Dangam District =

District of Kunar Province, Afghanistan

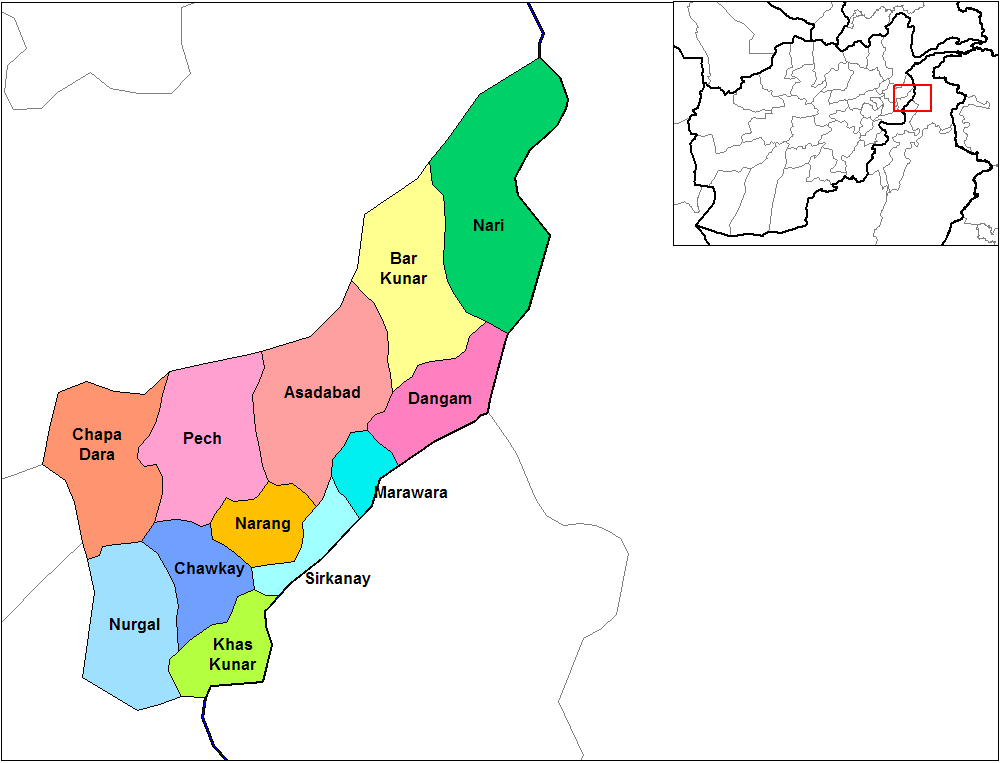
Dangam District shown in dark pink in the east

Dangam District (Pashto: ډنګام) is situated in the eastern end of Kunar Province in Afghanistan. It borders Marawara district to the southwest, Asadabad district to the west, Bar Kunar district to the north, Nari district to the northeast and Khyber Pakhtunkhwa in Pakistan to the east. The district is mountainous, but it is also economically underdeveloped.

The population of Dangam is approximately 18,803 (2019). Of this, around 98% are Pashtuns and the remaining 2% are Tajiks. There are 50 sub-villages and the district center is Dangam (34.9925°N 71.4189°E) at 1356 m altitude, located in the central part of the district.

Dangam and the region in general has been known for military actions against militant groups. It was reported in 2018 that Pakistani military entered Dangam District in helicopters to conduct air strikes.
