= Watapur District =

District of Afghanistan

Coordinates: 34.9109°N 71.1270°E

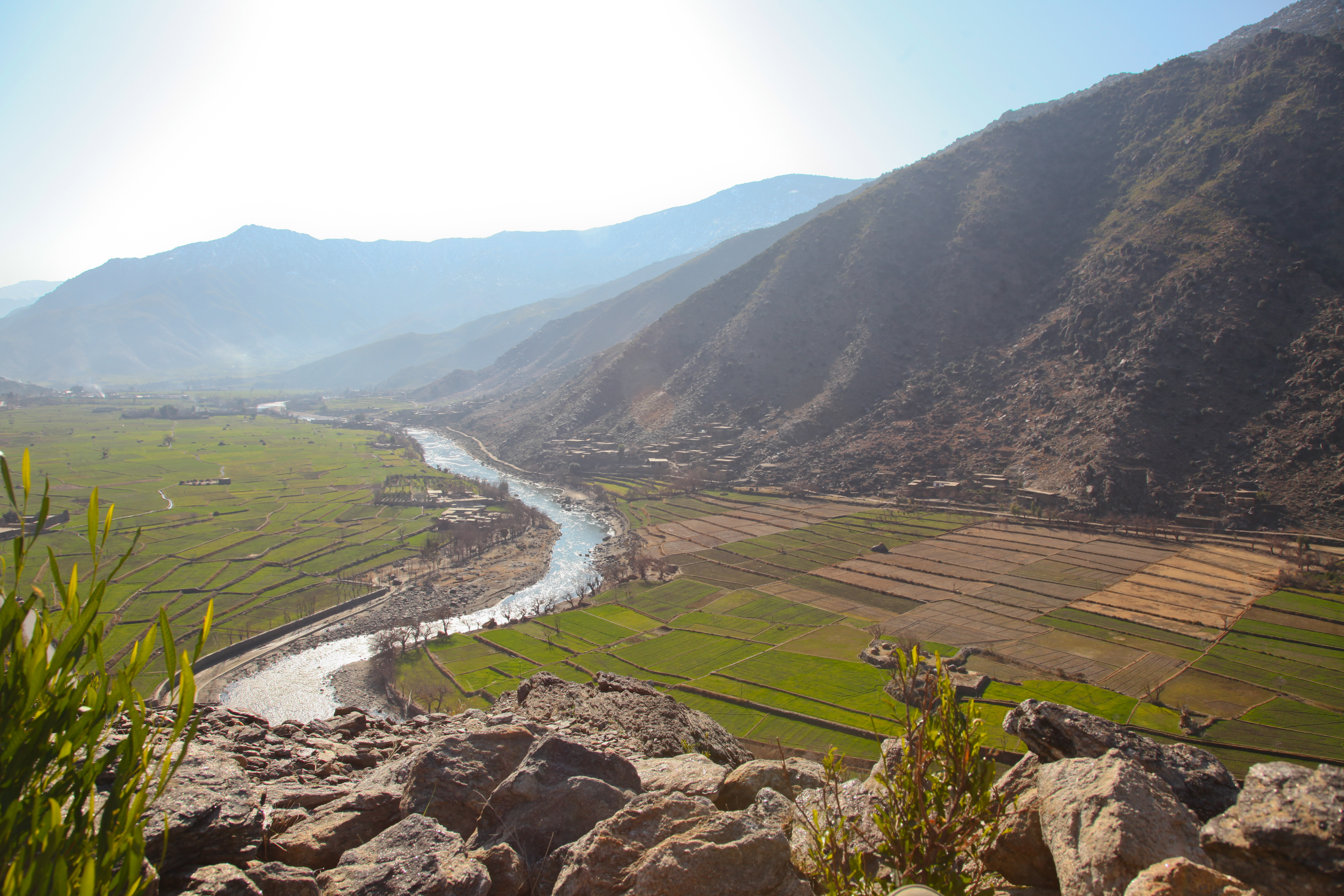
A river in Watapur district

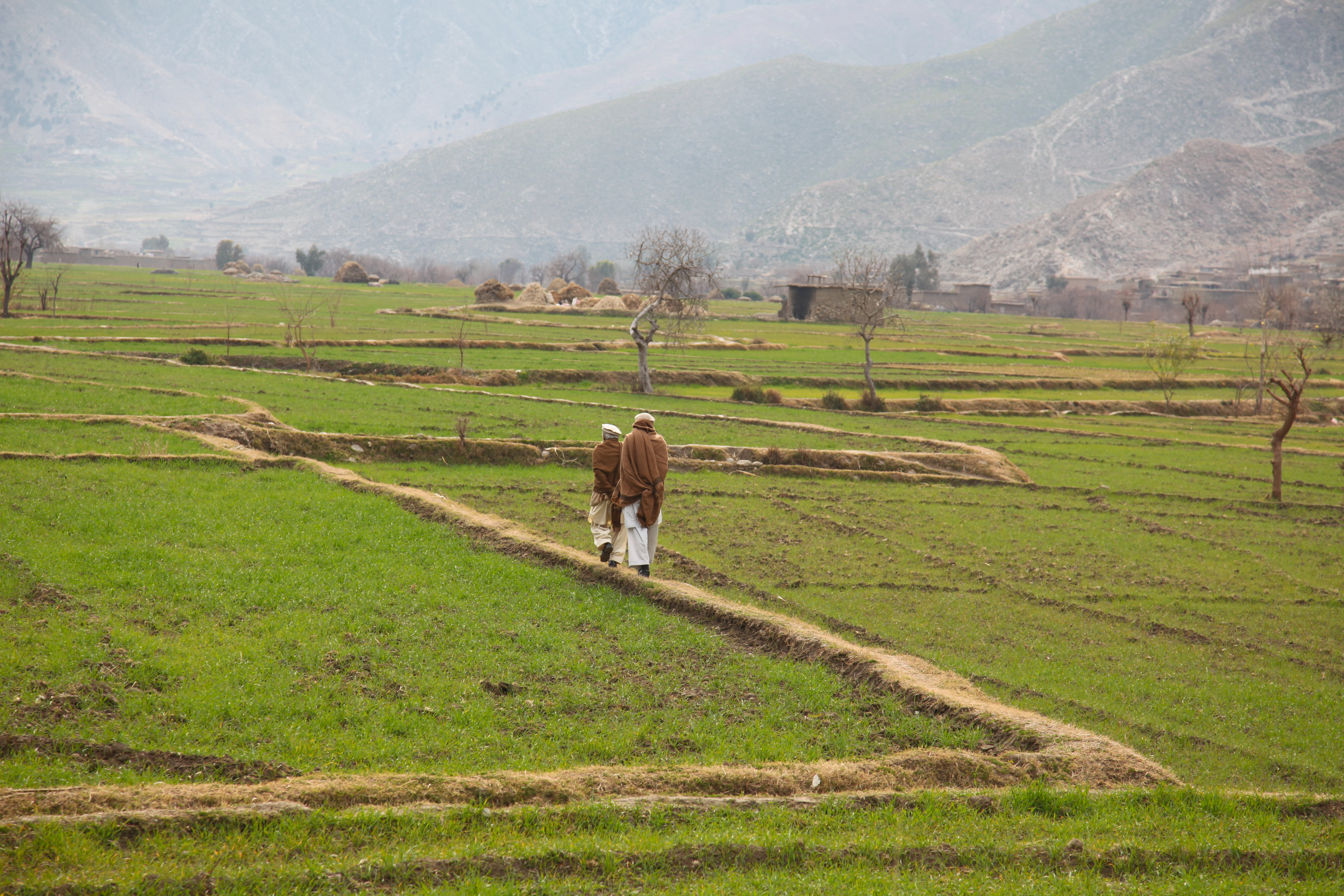
A field in Mulkanah Village of Watapur district

Watapur District (Pashto: واټاپور) is situated in the central part of Kunar Province in Afghanistan. It was split from Asadabad district. The district is mountainous with 60 large and small villages. The population is around 60,000 (2022 est.).

== See also ==
- Districts of Afghanistan
