= Narang Badil District =

District of Afghanistan

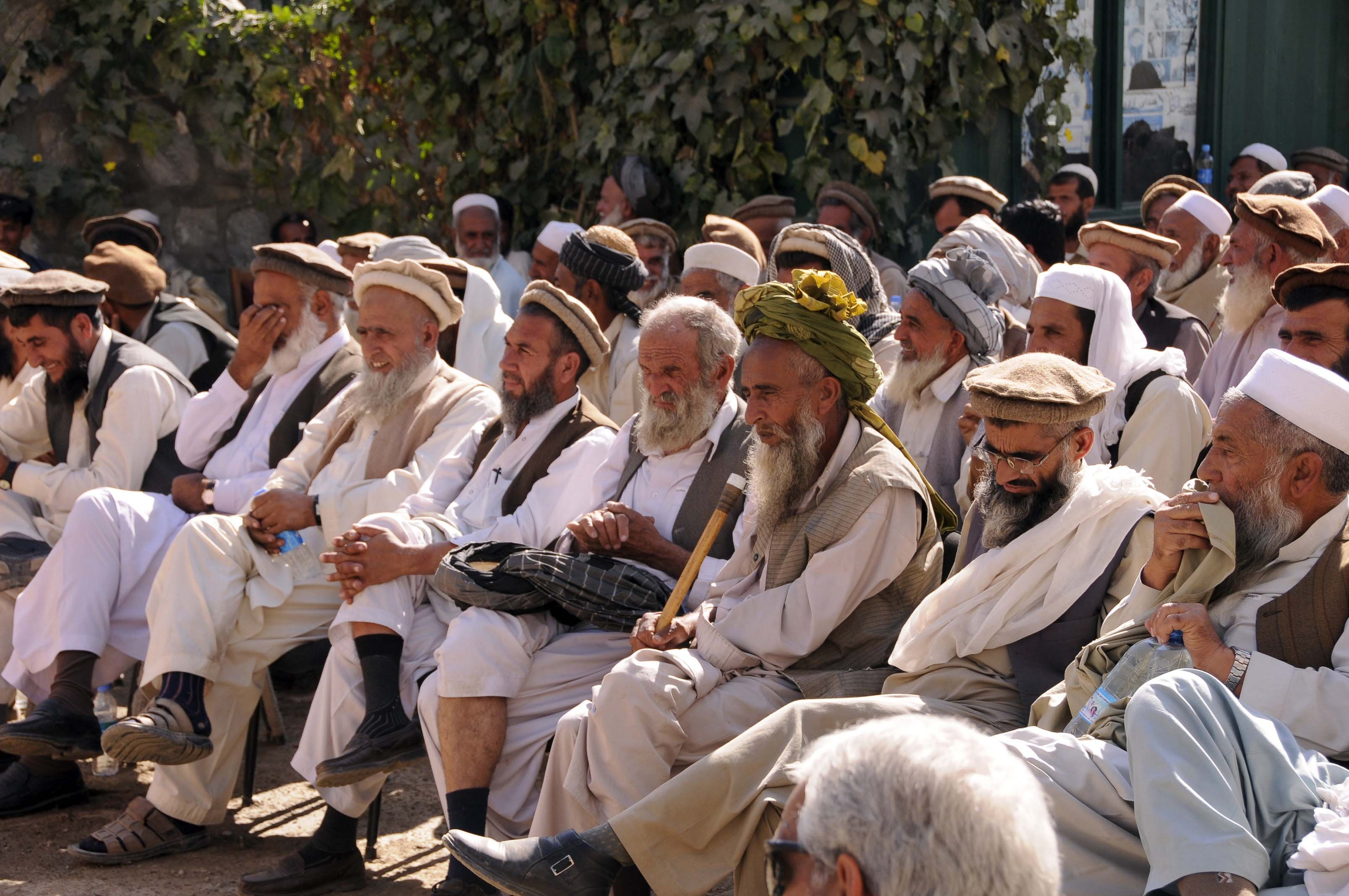
Village elders at a shura in Narang in 2010

Narang Badil (Pashto: نارنګ بدیل) is a village in the central part of Kunar Province, Afghanistan south of Asadabad. It is surrounded by high mountains and the Kunar River. The population was 36,700 in 2014.

== See also ==
- Narang night raid
- COP Badel
