= Kashmir Khan =

Afghan politician

After the Taliban took charge in Kabul, Afghanistan in 1994, Commander Kashmir Khan opposed the Taliban regime and fought several battles with the Taliban. Kashmir Khan belonged to the Shura Nizami (military council) of Hezb-e Islami. Human Rights Watch, quoting the Afghan Support Project, reports that the Hezb-e Islami attacked Kabul through regular rocket bombardment, causing extensive civilian casualties, and damage to property.

In 2002 the Hezb-e Islami is reported to have split, with the hard-line Islamists, including Kashmir Khan, remaining with the party's leader, Gulbuddin Hekmatyar. Other former senior members are reported to have wished to join in the democratic process.

On August 29, 2002, the Asia Times reported:

"If American forces venture into Kunar they will be against tremendous odds. Kashmir Khan - the most powerful Hezb-e-Islami commander - keeps his base in the mountains of Kunar. Haji S says that 'even the Taliban at the time did not disturb him. He is not interested in ideology or politics. He is interested in power.' This also means that Kashmir Khan is unbribable by the Americans."

Kashmir Khan was reported to have been in negotiations with the Hamid Karzai government on February 22, 2005.

The Asia Times reported, on February 8, 2006, that Khan was alive, and still serving as a commander for the Hezb-e Islami.
