= Kunar Provincial Reconstruction Team =

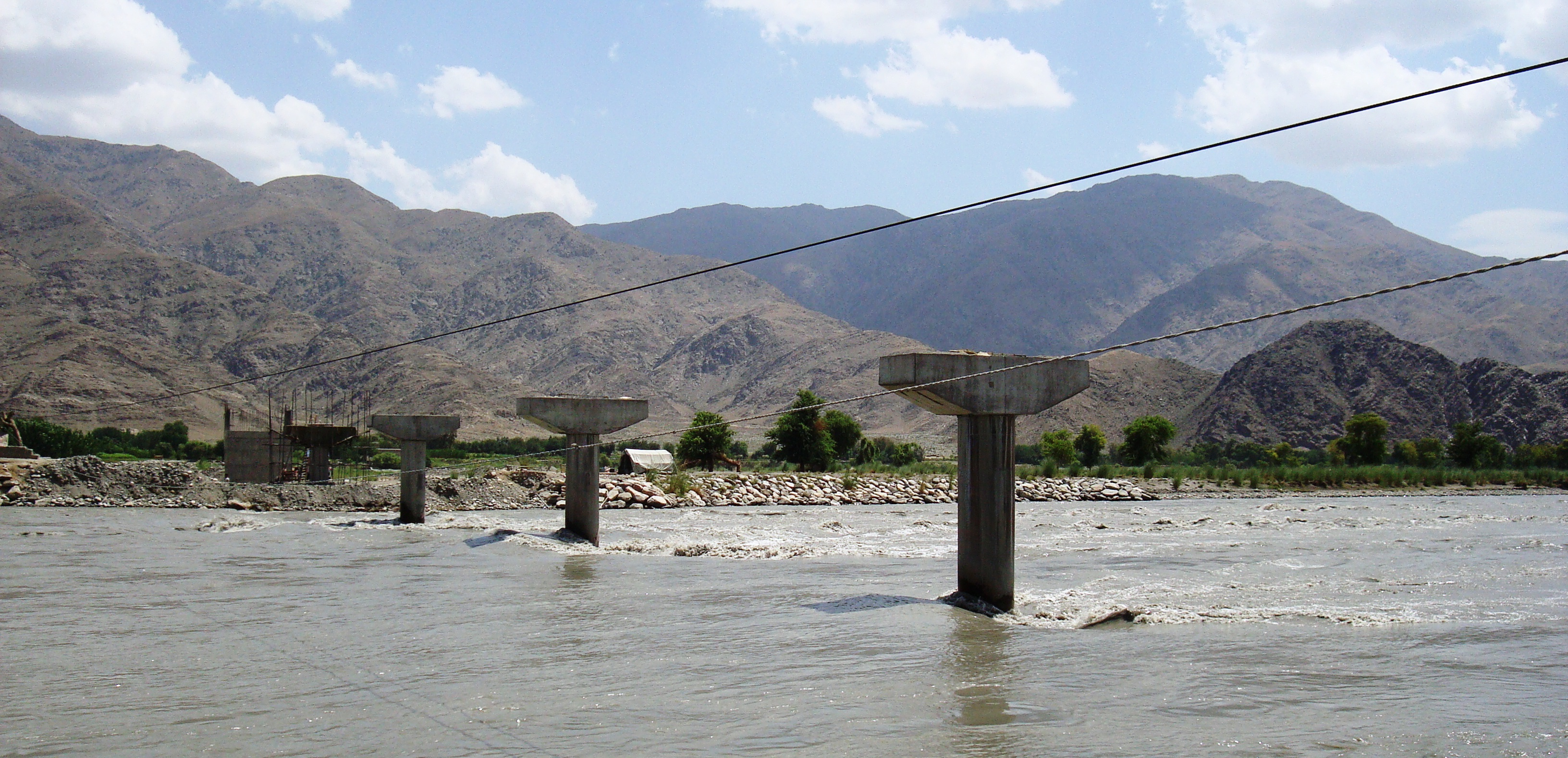
Guryak Truck Bridge – under construction in 2008.

The Kunar Provincial Reconstruction Team is one of the Provincial Reconstruction Teams in Afghanistan. Kunar is a rugged mountainous province, and the team has built five new bridges. The team has built or reconstructed a number of roads and irrigation canals. The team's medical component has participated in helping to reconstruct Kunar's medical system.
