= Nari District =

District of Kunar Province, Afghanistan

Nari District د ناړۍ ولسوالۍ
- District
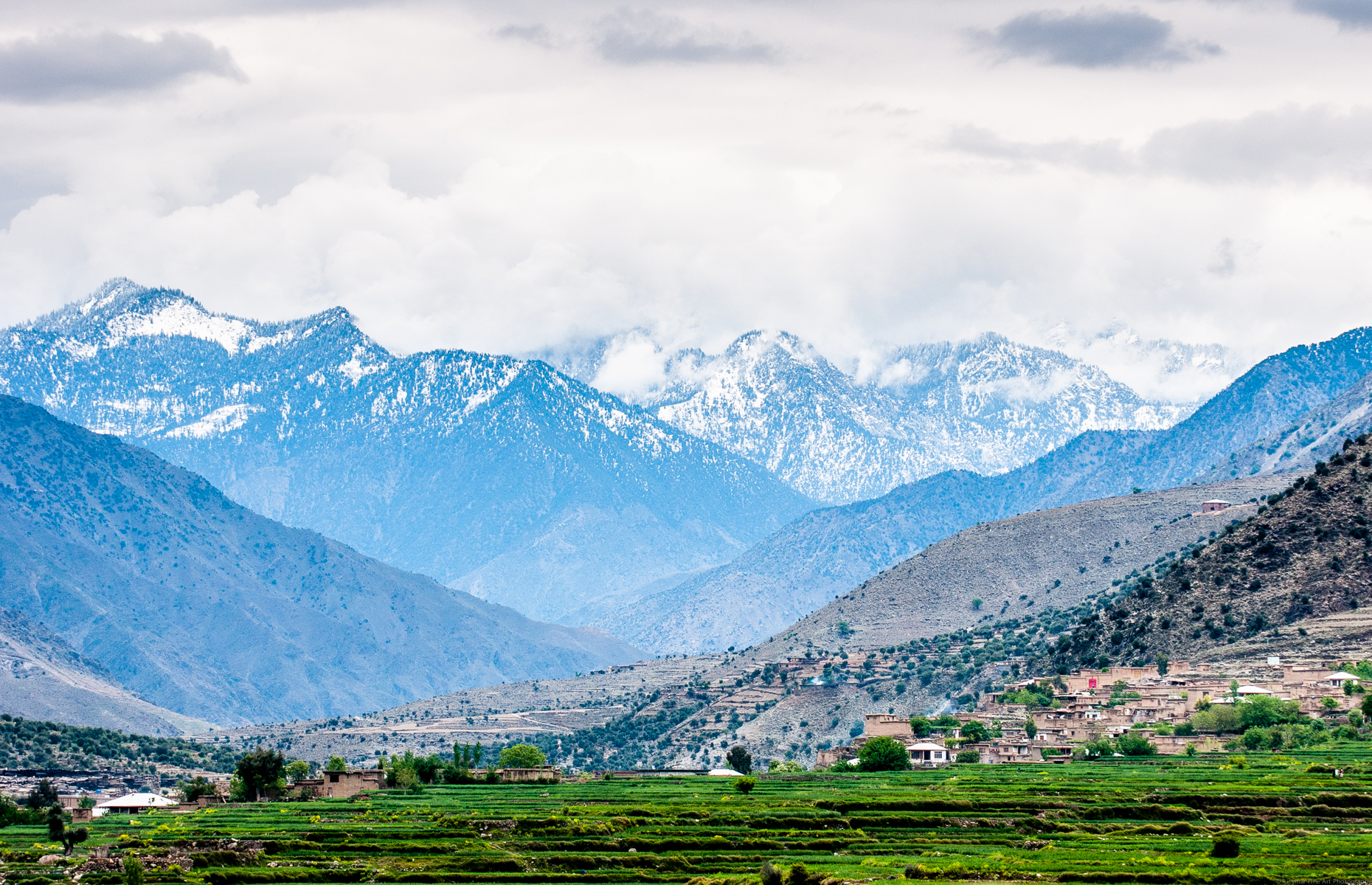
- View in Nari District

- Location in Afghanistan
- Coordinates: 35.2103°N 71.5250°E
- Country: Afghanistan
- Province: Kunar
- Capital: Nari

Population (2006)
  - Total: 24,500
- Time zone: UTC+04:30 (Afghanistan Time)

Nari District (Pashto: د ناړۍ ولسوالۍ) is one of the districts of Kunar Province in eastern Afghanistan. It borders Bar Kunar District to the west, Nuristan Province to the north, Khyber Pakhtunkhwa province of Pakistan to the east and Dangam District to the south. The population was reported in 2006 as 24,500 residents of which around 60% is ethnic Pashtun and the remaining 40% is Pashai and others. The district center is the village of Nari 35.2103°N 71.5250°E at 1153 m altitude in a river valley. The arable land is not enough. The residents usually collect wood and beans and sell them.

Residents of Nari District have become victims of the Afghanistan–Pakistan border skirmishes in the past.

== See also ==
- Districts of Afghanistan
- Valleys of Afghanistan
