= Sirkanay District =

District in Afghanistan

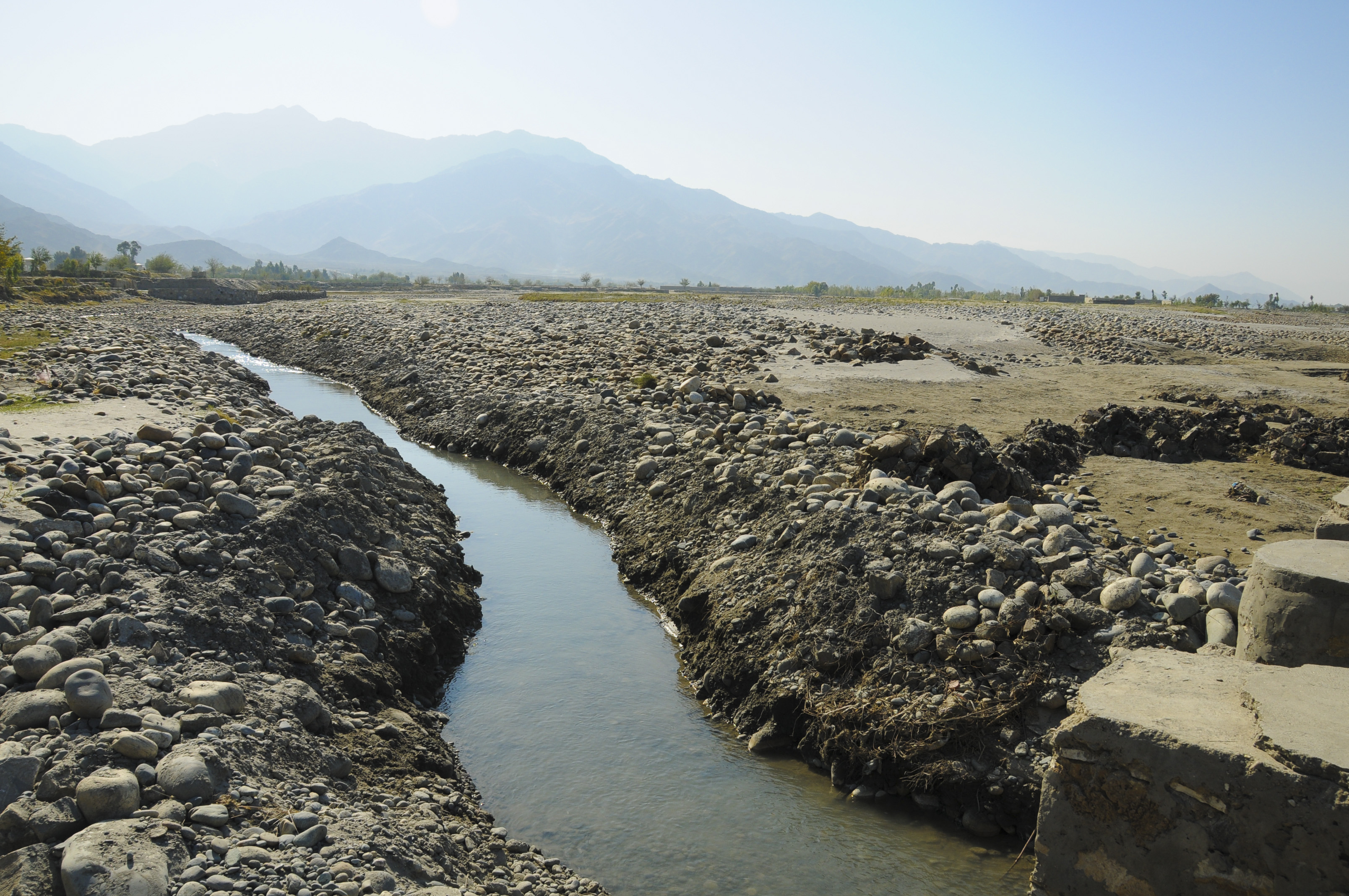
Sirkanay District of Kunar Province, Afghanistan

Sirkanay District (Pashto: سرکنی) (Sarkani District) is situated in the central part of Kunar Province, Afghanistan. It borders Pakistan to the south. The population is 39,292 (2019). The district administrative center is the village of Serkanay (34.7906°N 71.1086°E) at 775 m altitude. To the north the district borders the Kunar River, which irrigates the small part of arable land. Drought is the major problem of the people. The majority of the houses (70%) were destroyed during the wars. Many young men live and work in Pakistan.

Ethnic background: Nearly all population of Serkanay District are pashtun people with a small number of gujars. Alakozais are the dominant tribe of the district who live in the central part of the district. Other tribes are Mamoond, Momand, Safi and Salarzais.

== Villages of Sarkani District ==
- Sarkano
- Pashad
- Donai
- Nawa
- Ganjgal
- Barogai
- Barabad
- Tango
- Shonkray
- Bila

== See also ==
- Districts of Afghanistan
