= Chapa Dara District =

District of Kunar Province, Afghanistan

Chapa Dara چپه دره
- District
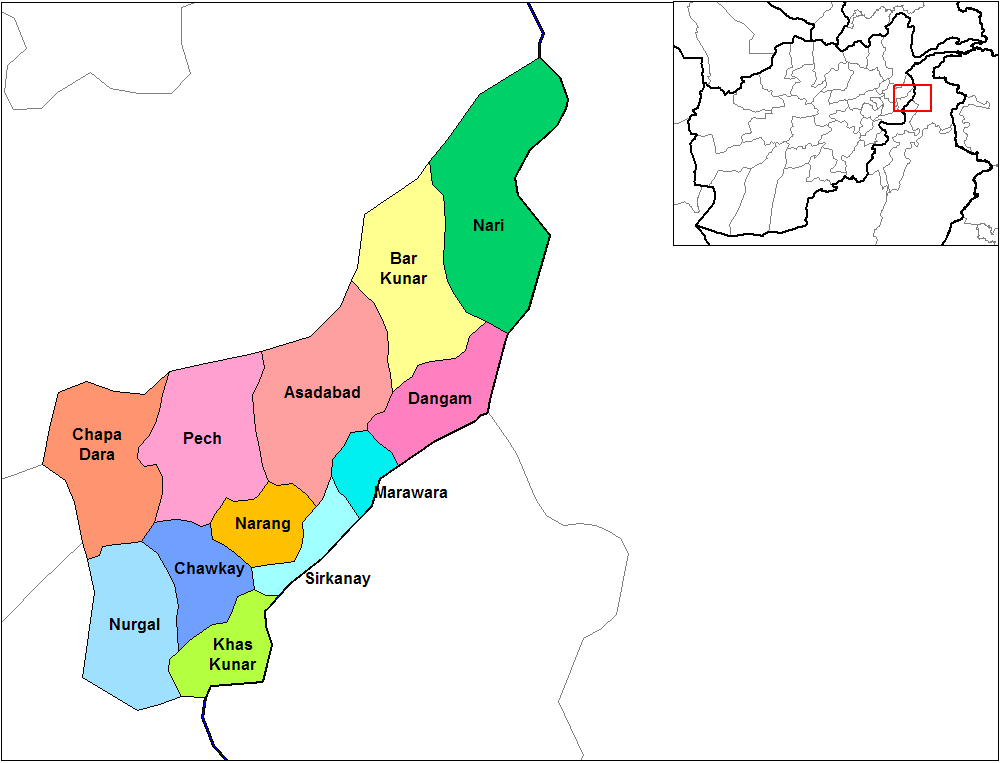
- Chapa Dara district (in red) within the province of Kunar.

- Location in Afghanistan
- Coordinates: 34°58′58″N 70°45′58″E
- Country: Afghanistan
- Province: Kunar
- Capital: Chapa Dara

Government
  - district governor: Khalilullah Khalili

Population (2023)
  - Total: 100,000
- Time zone: UTC+04:30 (Afghanistan Time)

Chapa Dara District (Pashto: چپه دره ولسوالۍ) is situated in the western part of Kunar Province in eastern Afghanistan. It has a population of around 100,000 residents as of 2023. The majority are ethnic Pashtuns. There may also be some Pashai. The district consists of a mountainous terrain. The capital of the district is Chapa Dara.

Chapa Dara District borders Nuristan Province to the north and northwest, Laghman Province to the southwest, and the Pech and Nurgal districts of Kunar Province to the east and south respectively. In the Digal valley region, remnants of the Indo-Aryan Nangalami (Grangali) language is still spoken in two villages.

== History ==
=== NATO helicopter crash ===
On July 25, 2011, a NATO attack helicopter crashed in the Chapa Dara region. The Taliban claimed they shot it down.

=== Government clearing operations ===
On 22 October 2018, the Ministry of Defense claimed that they killed 11 insurgents in airstrikes and clearing operations in Chapa Dara.

=== Islamic State attack ===
In late March 2019, a local chapter of the self-declared Islamic State attacked and took over the valleys of Lindalam and Digal from the Taliban in Chapa Dara district. The government stayed in control of the main valley formed by the Pech river. 11 Islamic State fighters and two Taliban were killed and nine Islamic State fighters and one other Taliban were wounded. Local officials asserted that there are 200 to 250 Islamic State fighters in Chapa Dara.

The violence forced thousands of families to flee their homes. Despite these numbers, there are no sprawling refugee camps in Chapa Dara. Some displaced people are staying in the houses of relatives, where – as usual across Afghanistan – extended families live together in small spaces. Others have received tents from the Afghan government that are randomly tucked away here and there. These families became dependent on aid by the World Food Programme and the United States Agency for International Development.

On 11 July 2019, the Taliban claimed that they regained control of parts of Chapa Dara from Islamic State.

== See also ==
- Districts of Afghanistan
