= Kunar Province =

Province of Afghanistan

Kunar کونړ کنر
- Province
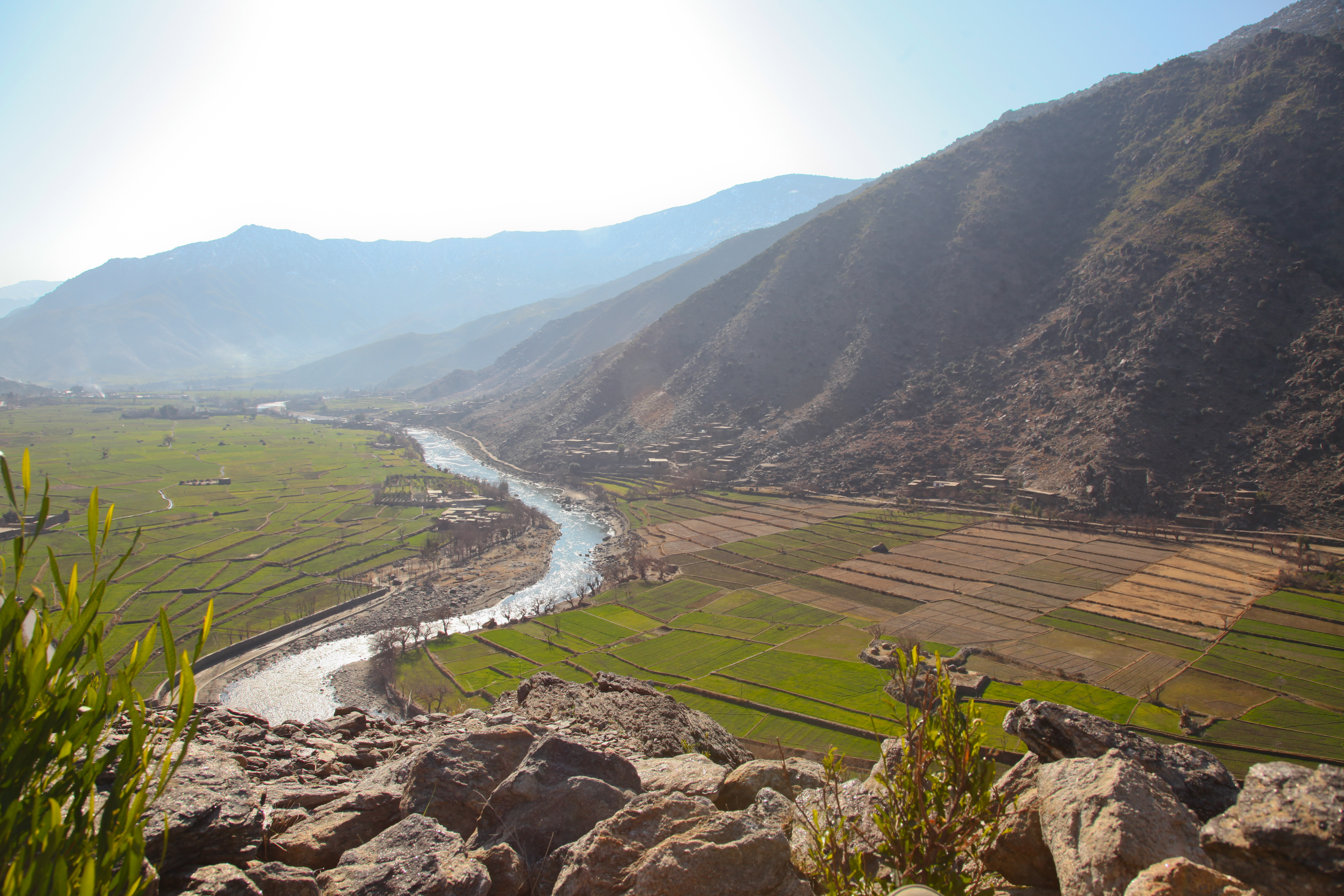
- Watapur District of Kunar Province in 2012

- Map of Afghanistan with Kunar highlighted
- Coordinates: 35.0°N 71.2°E
- Country: Afghanistan
- Capital: Asadabad

Government
  - Governor: Qudratullah Abu Hamza
  - Deputy Governor: Abdullah
  - Police Chief: Abdul Haq Haqqani

Area
  - Total: 4,339 km^{2} (1,675 sq mi)

Population (2025)
  - Total: 544,839
  - Density: 125.6/km^{2} (325.2/sq mi)
- Time zone: UTC+04:30 (Afghanistan Time)
- Postal code: 28xx
- ISO 3166 code: AF-KNR
- Main languages: Pashto

Kunar (Pashto: (Note: Pashto pronunciation: [ku.nəɽ, ku.naɽ]) کونړ; Dari: (Note: Dari pronunciation: [kʰʊ.nǽɾ]) کنر) is one of the 34 provinces of Afghanistan, located in the northeastern part of the country. Its capital is Asadabad, historically known as Chaghasray (چغسري) or Chaghan Saray (چغان سرای). Internally it borders the provinces of Nuristan, Nangarhar and Laghman; it also has an international border with Pakistan to the east. The province has an estimated population of 544,839 people.

Kunar is located in the long valley carved by the Chitral or Kunar River, and is geographically continuous with the Chitral Valley of Pakistan. Along with Nuristan, it was historically part of the border region known as Kafiristan (the "Land of the kafirs" or "Land of the infidels") and until a few decades ago, it was not considered an integral part of Afghanistan. Kunar is a sparsely populated, mountainous, forested border area. Major ethnic groups include Pashtuns, Pashayis and Nuristanis.

== History ==
=== Early ===
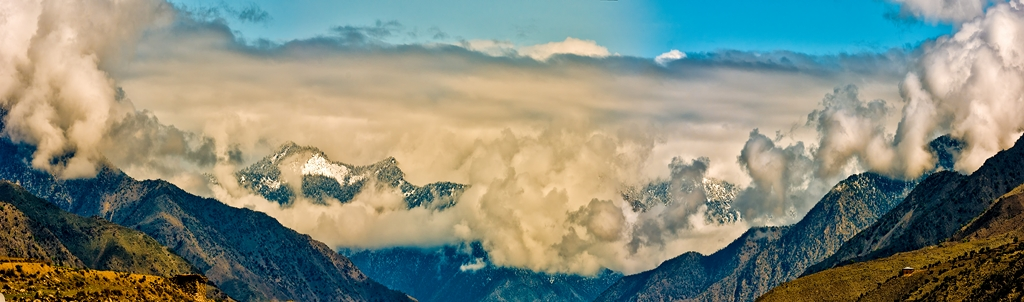
Panorama of a mountain range near Naray, Kunar province, Afghanistan

The Kunar Valley has been part of many empires in the past, from the Seleucid Empire to the recent Afghan Durrani Empire. Archaeologists have dated to AD 800–1000 a fortification system overlooking a Muslim cemetery at Chaga Serai (near the Pech-Kunar confluence). It was the seat of Gibarid dynasty from 900 to 1190 AD, as recorded by Akhund Darweza. Babur claimed in his autobiography, Baburnama, that the shrine of preacher and poet Mir Sayyid Ali Hamadani was located in Kunar, who is said to have died there in 1384 AD (786 AH). He also described agricultural products: citron, oranges, coriander, orchards, strong yellow wines, and a burial custom wherein a woman whose corpse moved was considered to have done good things in life. He mentions Chaghan-Sarai as a small town, and describes the towns folk as Muslims who mixed with the Kafirs (Nuristanis) of nearby Kafiristan and followed some of their customs. He further claimed to have later captured the town, even as the Pech River Kafirs tried to help the Chaghan Sarai residents repel his attack.

=== Early modern ===
Walter Hamilton's writing in 1828 mentions that the padishah of Cooner was joined in alliance with the neighboring Kafirs (non-Muslims) of Nuristan in battles against Muslim invaders. The Kafirs were forcibly converted by Abdur Rahman Khan in the 1890s.

Some British sources from the 19th-century Great Game period go into more detail about Kunar. For example, one from 1881 describes the various Kunar chiefs and their internecine wars, the conflict with Dost Mohammad Khan and their relations with the British. Names vary greatly, with Kunar sometimes being called Kama, or Kashkote, and the capital being listed as "Pashoot", which is not on modern maps.

An 1891 book described the Kunar region as split between the lower river area, controlled by Afghan chiefs, and the upstream area, where the Kunar River was actually referred to as the Chitral River. The major city of Chitral (in modern Pakistan) was the base of a Mehtar (King), who ruled under the Maharajah of Kashmir.

=== Modern ===
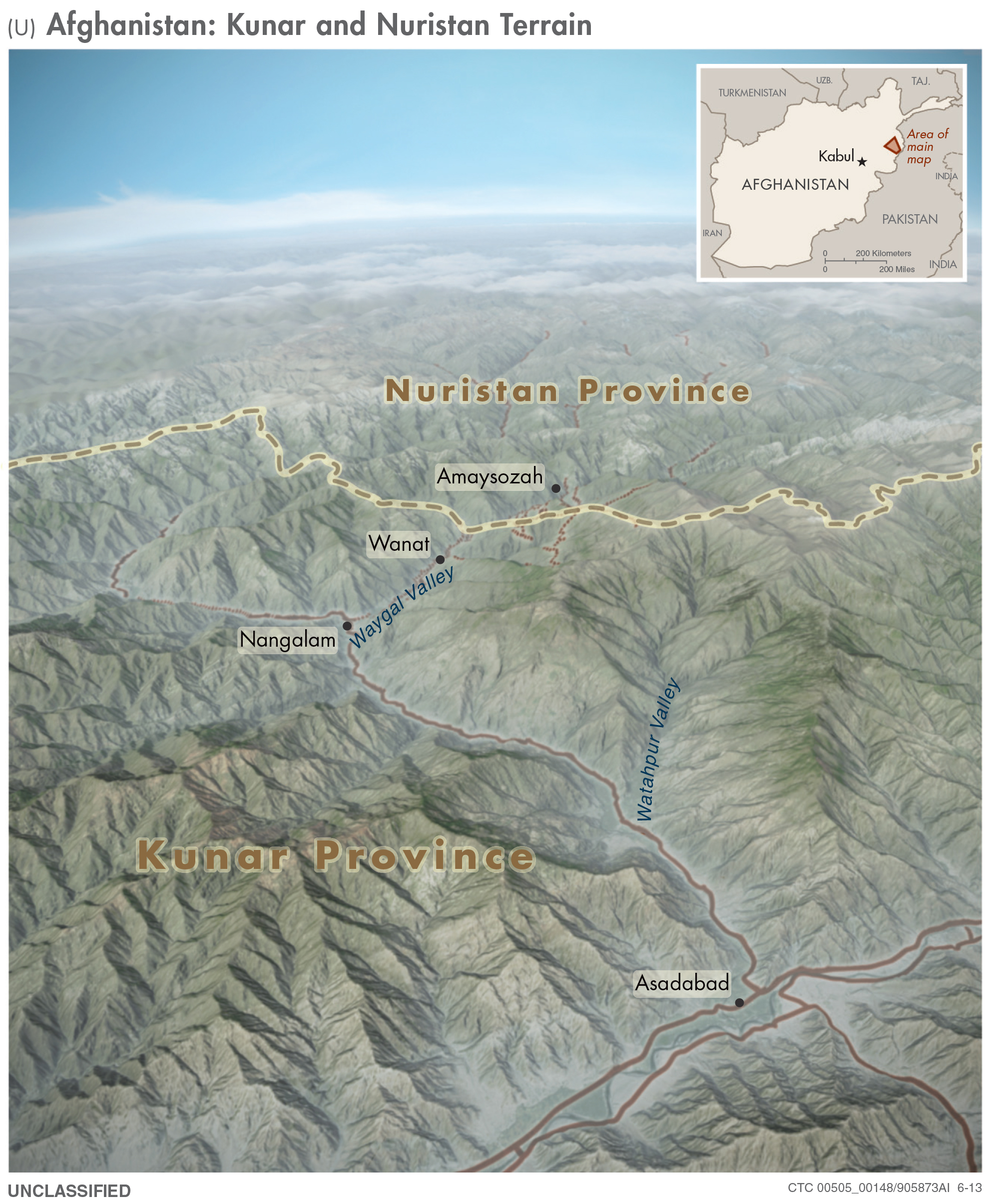
Kunar Province 3D, looking NW

The modern province of Kunar was established on 30 April 1964, when Afghanistan was reorganised into 29 provinces, replacing the previous system of fewer but larger administrative units. It comprised the former Governorate of Kunarha (Dari: حکومت کنرها, romanized: Ḥukūmat-i Kunaṛhā), whose territory broadly corresponded to the southern portions of the present-day province of Kunar and the northern portions of present-day Nangarhar. In 1975, with the publication of the official yearbook of the Republic of Afghanistan, it was reported that Kunar was downgraded from a province to a large district (Pashto: لوی ولسوالۍ, romanized: Lōy Wōleswālī) within the province of Nangarhar the past year.

According to a US Army paper, the Pashtuns of Kunar and the Kafirs of Kunar/Nuristan eventually joined in the 20th century. Fundamentalist religion came to the region in the 1950s but the heavy unification happened during the Soviet–Afghan War (1979–88). Some of the first anti-government forces (lashkar) rose in the Kunar region.

Kerala, a town near Asadabad, was the site of the 1979 Kerala massacre, where the male population of a village was allegedly murdered by the People's Democratic Party of Afghanistan and its Soviet advisors.

Later, over ten-thousand Soviet and Afghan communist troops invaded the region, resulting in a massive refugee flow of the populace into Khyber Pakhtunkhwa, Pakistan. There were Spetsnaz units based in Asadabad (where the Pech meets the Kunar), in Jalalabad (where the Kunar meets the Kabul), and other towns. The major mujahideen groups had representation in the area, and were successful enough to confine the Communist troops for the most part to their fortifications in the major towns of the Kunar valley.

Eventually one of the Mujahideen leaders, Jamil al-Rahman, formed a movement that had a very strict interpretation of Islam, along the lines of Wahhabism and/or Salafism. He was supported by elements in Saudi Arabia, and later attracted many Saudis and Egyptians who had come to Afghanistan to fight Jihad.

When the Soviets left in 1988, the leader of the Mujahideen group Hizb-i-Islami, Gulbuddin Hekmatyar, began to fight with Jamil al-Rahman over control of the area. Hekmatyar was victorious and eventually his troops sacked Asadabad. By 1996 however, Mullah Omar's Taliban had invaded Kunar and driven out Hekmatyar.

==== 21st century ====
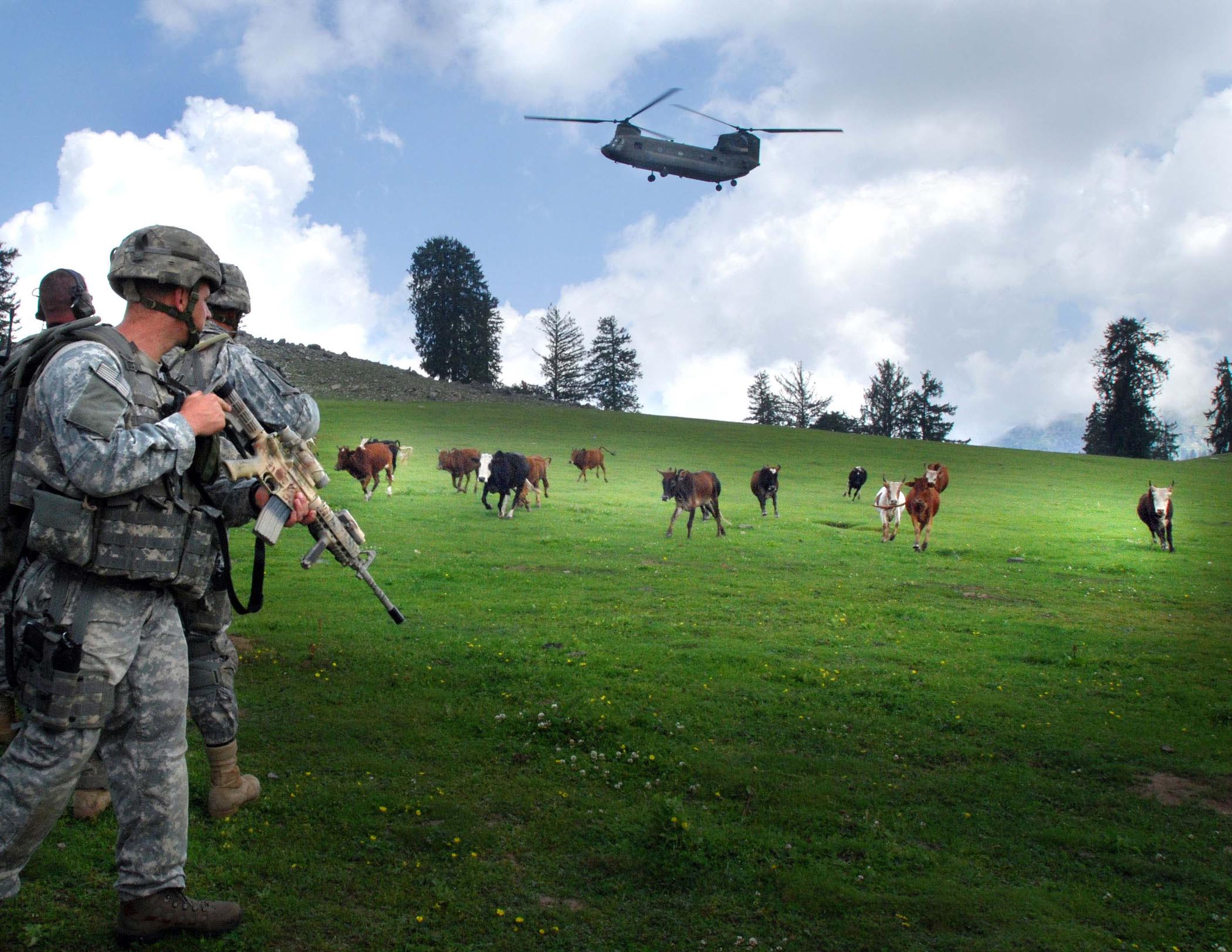
US soldiers near FOB (Forward Operating Base) Naray.

After the September 11 attacks of 2001, Afghanistan was invaded by United States and other NATO countries provided direct support to the Northern Alliance forces fighting the Taliban regime, which was quickly toppled and fled to remote areas. It was part of the war on terror and to assist the new government that was led by Hamid Karzai. It was one of the four "N2KL" provinces (Nangarhar Province, Nuristan Province, Kunar Province and Laghman Province). N2KL was the designation used by the US and Coalition Forces in Afghanistan for the rugged region along the Afghanistan–Pakistan border opposite Pakistan's Khyber Pakhtunkhwa province. Kunar is the center of the N2KL region.

During the 19th century British military expeditions, the 1980s Soviet occupation, and the latest conflict, Kunar has been a favoured spot of insurgent groups. Its impenetrable terrain, cave networks and the border with the semi-autonomous Pakistani Khyber Pakhtunkhwa provide significant advantages for unconventional warfare and militant groups. The province is informally known as "Enemy Central" and "Indian Country" by Western armed forces serving in Afghanistan. Between January 2006 and March 2010 more than 65% of all insurgent incidents in Afghanistan occurred in Kunar province.

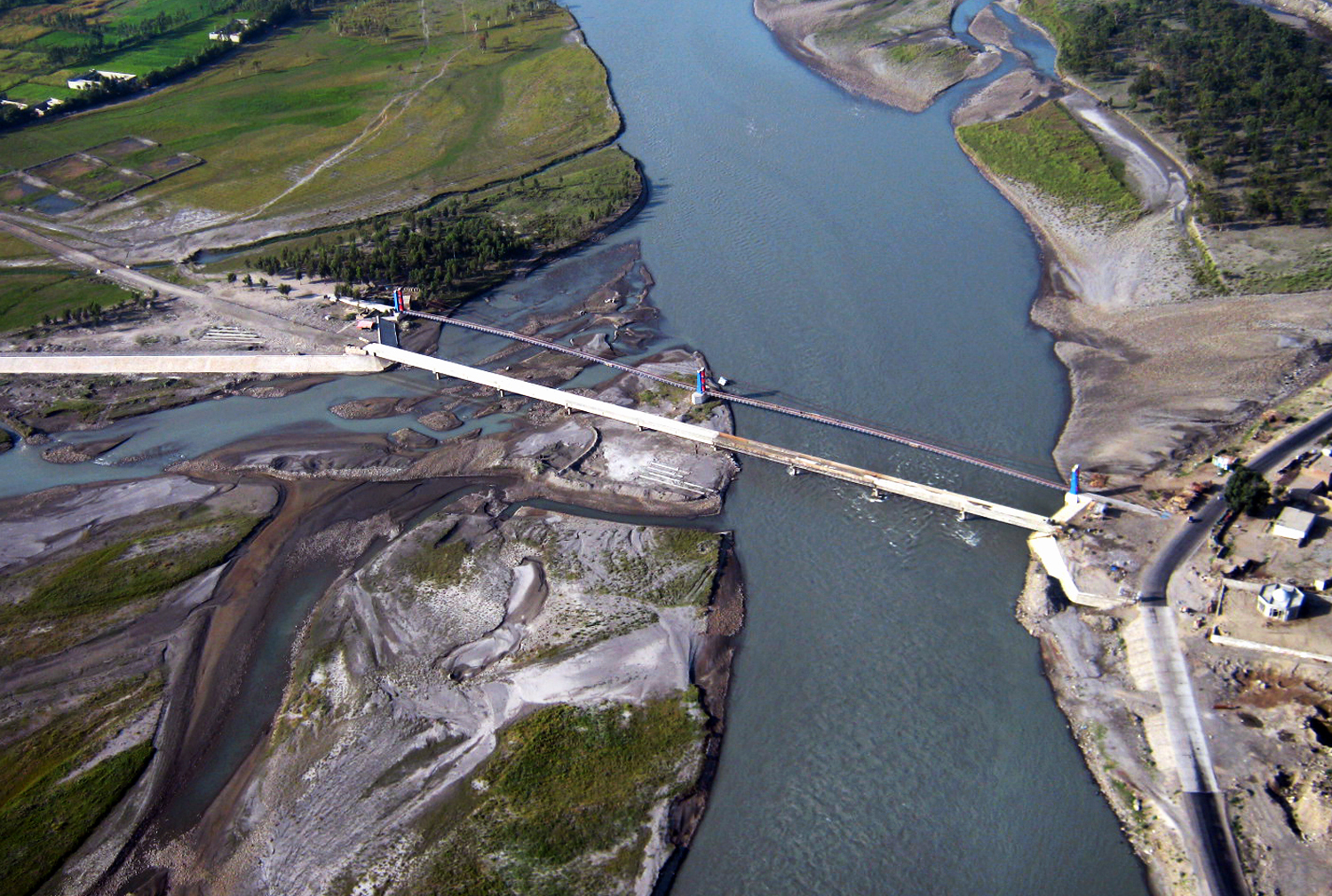
A bridge in Kunar province.

Asadabad used to host both an American Provincial Reconstruction Team at nearby Forward Operating Base Wright and a UNAMA development office. Additionally, representatives of the United States Agency for International Development (USAID), US State and Agriculture Departments advise the local government. A US Army Agribusiness Development Team (ADT) was deployed to the province in late 2009. Successive ADTs continue to serve in the province. Like many of the mountainous eastern provinces of Afghanistan, the groups involved in armed conflict vary greatly in strength and purpose. Native Taliban forces mingle with foreign al-Qaeda fighters, while former mujahadeen militias, such as Hekmatyar's Hezb-e-Islami Gulbuddin, continue to operate as they did in the chaotic post-Soviet years. Another strong militia in the region is the Hezbi Islami faction of the late Mulavi Younas Khalis, who had his headquarters in neighboring Nuristan Province.

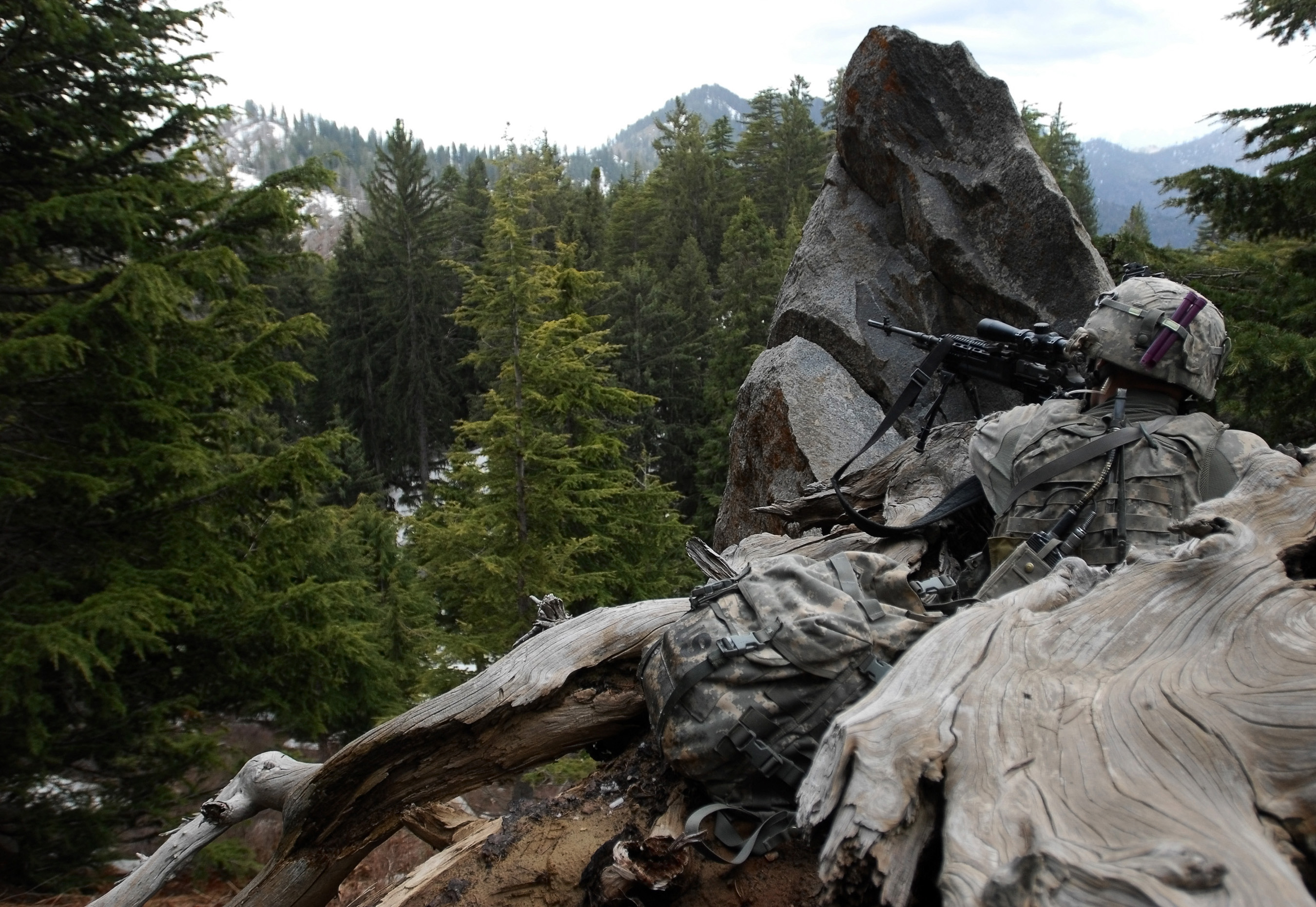
A soldier observes the mountain landscape opposite of his position that surrounds the Korengal Valley

The province which is relatively small, was occupied by one of the highest concentrations of both US and Afghan security forces during the war. Special Operations Forces operated extensively throughout the area.

As of September 2015 the United States has awarded twelve Medals of Honor for actions in Afghanistan. Six of these have been awarded for actions in Kunar Province, and an additional four have been awarded for neighboring Nuristan Province.

Operation Mountain Resolve in 2003 involved the 10th Mountain Division air dropping into Nuristan and traveling dozens of kilometers, including in Kunar, to fight what was termed "Anti-Coalition Militia" (ACM) activity.

In 2005, Operation Red Wings set out with the intent to disrupt ACM activity in the region in order to further aid the stabilization efforts of the region for the upcoming September 18, 2005 Afghan National Parliamentary Elections. Anti-Coalition Militia activity in the region was carried out at the time most notably by a small group led by a local man named Ahmad Shah (from Nangarhar Province) who had aspirations of regional Islamic fundamentalist prominence, hence he and his small group would be one of the primary targets of the operation. A team of four Navy SEALs, tasked for surveillance and reconnaissance of a group of structures known to be used by Ahmad Shah and his men, fell into an ambush by Shah and his group just hours after inserting by fastrope from an MH-47 helicopter in the area. Three of the four SEALs were killed in the ambush; a quick reaction force helicopter sent in for their aid was subsequently shot down with an RPG-7 rocket propelled grenade by one of Shah's men, 19 American Forces were killed when their CH-47 Chinook helicopter was shot down, representing the second biggest loss of American forces since their invasion of the country.

According to Pakistan's Interior Minister Rehman Malik, Osama bin Laden was most likely hiding in Kunar Province in the spring and summer of 2009: "According to our information Osama is in Afghanistan, probably Kunar, as most of the activities against Pakistan are being directed from Kunar." Bin Laden was later found and killed in Abbottabad, Pakistan, contrary to what the Pakistani government had previously stated. He had been living there since 2005.

On 16 April 2022, Pakistani airstrikes and rocket attacks targeted the Chogam village of Shultan District, killing three girls, two boys, and one woman, and wounding one man.

A serious earthquake struck Kunar on 31 August 2025 at 11:47 pm local time, with damage especially bad in Nurgal District.

== Geography ==
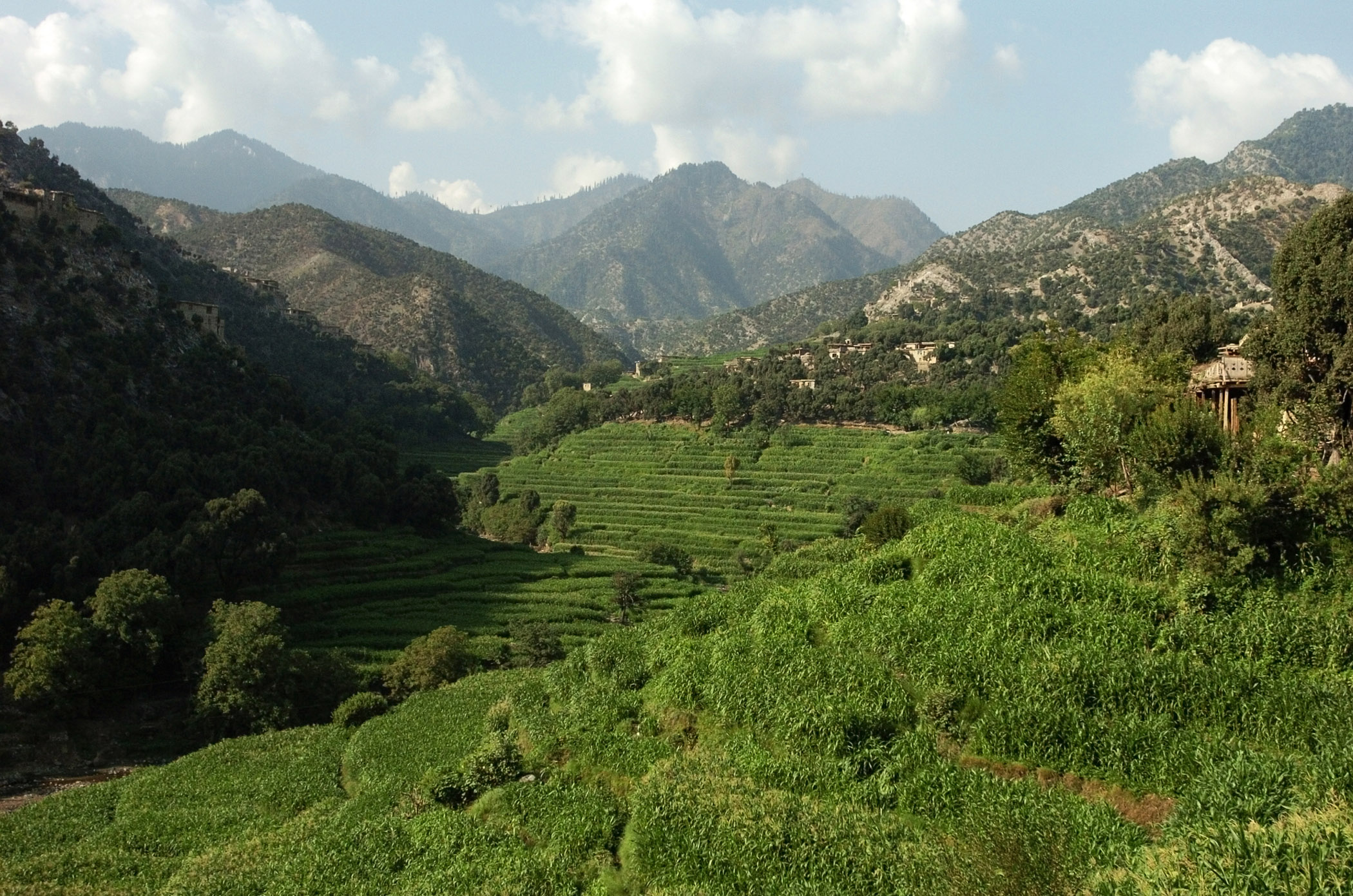
View of the Korangal Valley

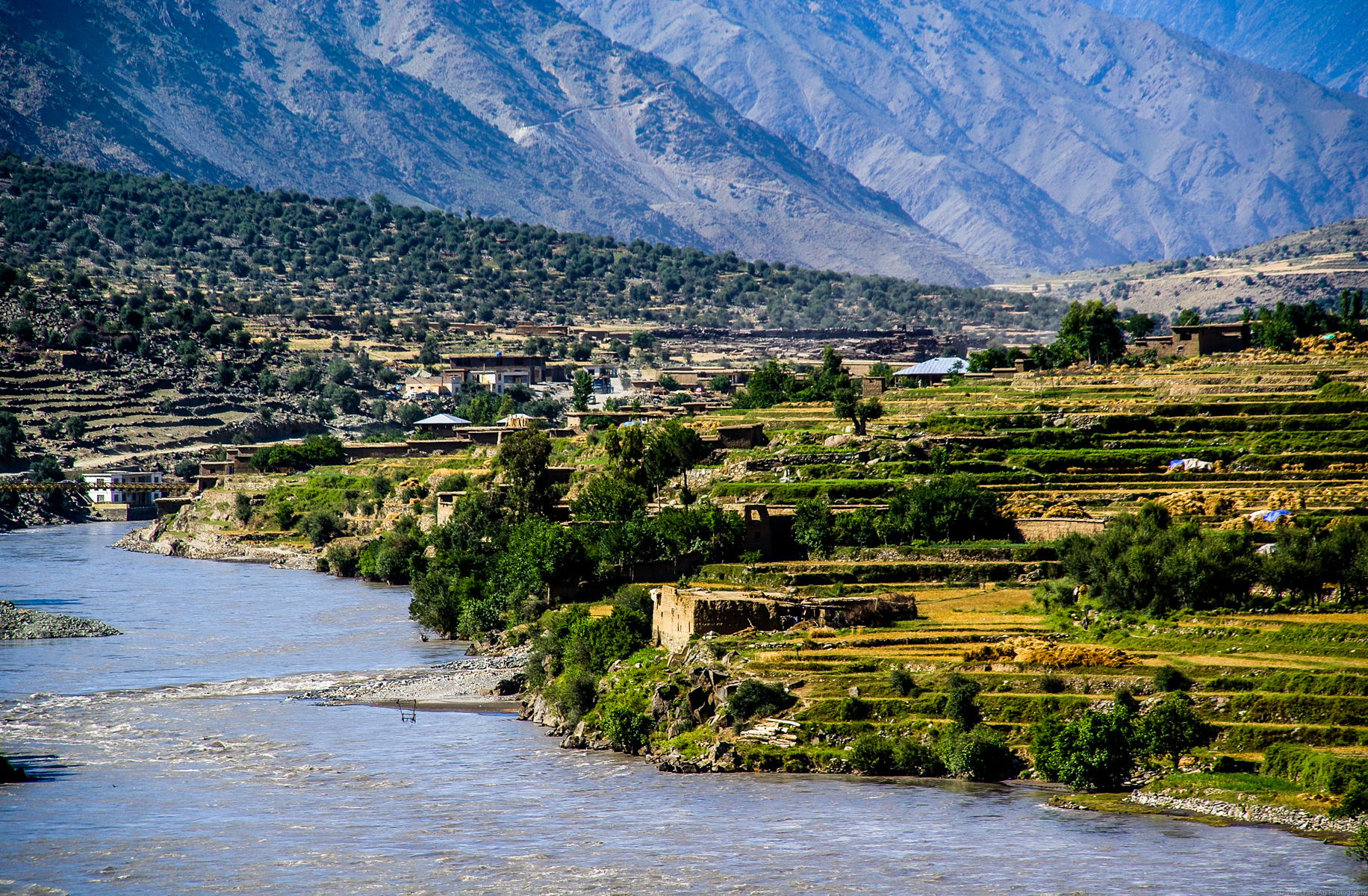
Nari District

Kunar province is located in the northeast of Afghanistan. It borders with Nangarhar Province to the south, Nuristan Province to the north, Laghman Province to the west and has a border with Pakistan in the east. The province covers an area of 4,339 km^{2}. Nearly nine tenths (86%) of the province is mountainous or semi mountainous terrain while one eighth (12%) of the area is made up of relatively flat land. The primary geographic features of the province are the lower Hindu Kush mountains which are cut by the Kunar River to form the forested Kunar Valley. The river flows south and southwest from its source in the Pamir area and is part of the Indus River watershed via the Kabul River which it meets at Jalalabad. The Kunar is a primary draining conduit for the Hindu Kush basin and several tributaries, including the Pech, which form distinct and significant valleys in the area. The mountains, narrow valleys with steep walls, and rivers present formidable natural obstacles and have historically constrained all movement through the province. Even in the early 21st century, movement on foot, with pack animals, or with motorized vehicles is extremely limited and channeled due to the significant geographic restrictions.

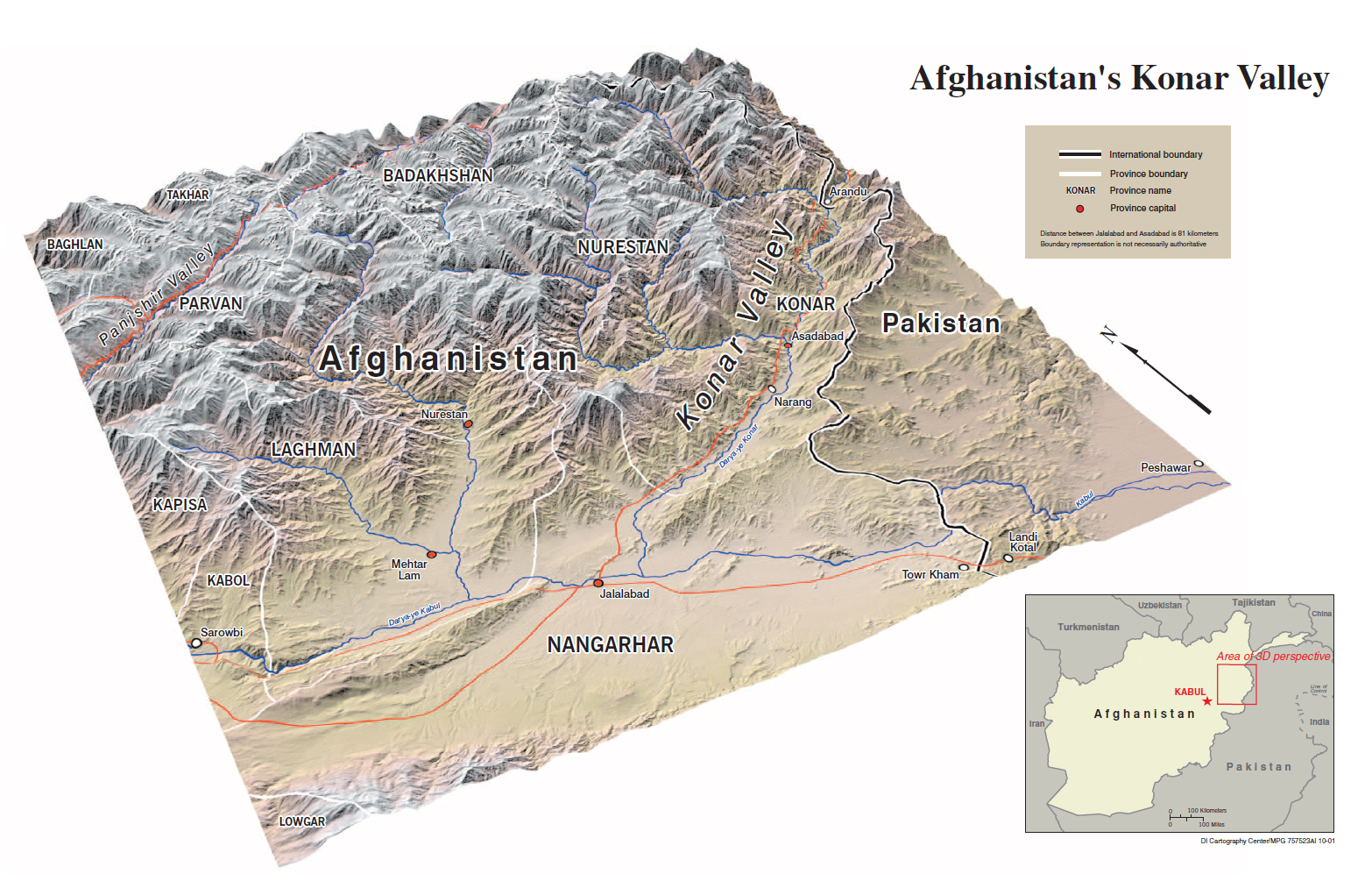
Kunar valley, 3D

The length of the Kunar Valley is almost entirely narrow with steep and rugged mountains on both sides. The center of the valley is occupied by the Kunar River flowing south where it joins the Kabul River. Subsistence farming and goat-herding are the extent of agriculture production on the valley floor and lower elevations. There are limited and small forested areas in some side valleys but more than 95% of the valley has been deforested. In limited areas at higher elevations there are sustained grassy mountain meadows. Overwhelmingly though the Kunar Valley is an arid, rocky, steep landscape with a fast-moving muddy river as its primary geographic feature.

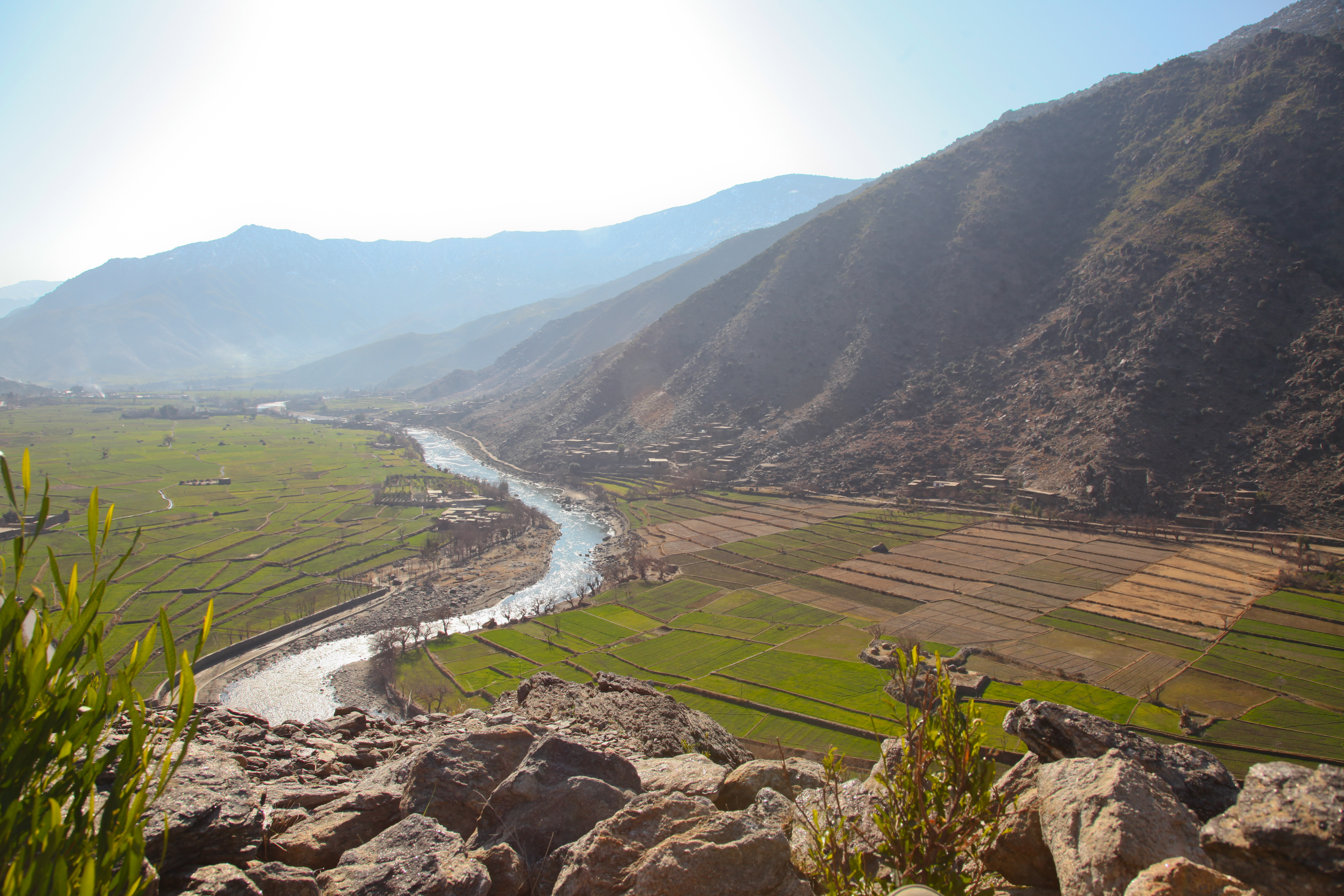
Watapur district, Kunar valley

== Administrative divisions ==
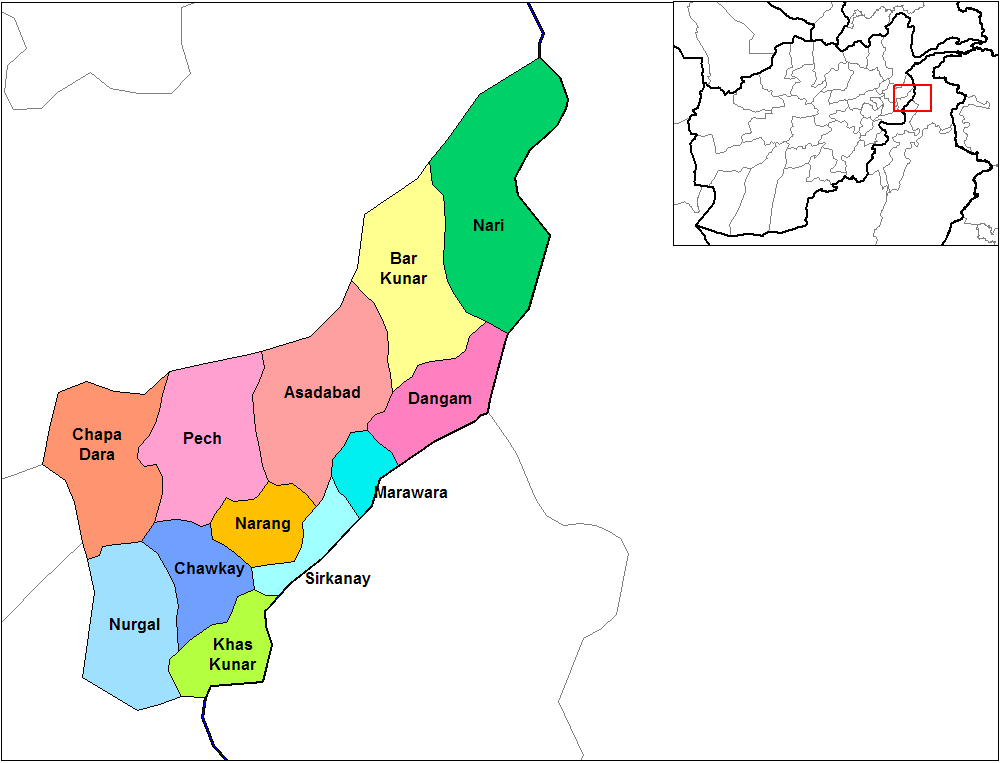
Map of the districts of Konar as of January 2004, prior to the redrawing of provincial and district boundaries later that year

The districts in Kunar Province as of March 2009 are:

Districts of Kunar Province
District	Capital	Population	Area	Pop. density	Notes
Asadabad	Asadabad	42,396	84	455	100% Pashtun. Is the Capital of Kunar Province, which includes Asadabad and adjacent towns, immediately surrounding the confluence of the Pech and Kunar Rivers
Bar Kunar	Asmar	27,077	187	133	100% Pashtun. Formerly known as Asmar District.
Chapa Dara	Chapa Dara	38,226	417	85	100% Pashtun.
Chawkay		40,389	245	167	100% Pashtun. Also known as Sawkai District.
Dangam		19,132	176	109	98% Pashtun, 2% Tajik.
Dara-I-Pech		67,330	418	148	100% Pashtun. Commonly known as the Pech District or Manogai District
Ghaziabad	Ghaziabad	23,023	578	37	100% Pashtun. Formerly northern Bar Kunar District.
Khas Kunar		43,149	209	190	100% Pashtun. Khas Kunar District is the largest district in the Kunar Province.
Marawara		25,195	147	157	100% Pashtun.
Narang Aw Badil		37,213	187	183	100% Pashtun.
Nari		34,027	305	103	60% Pashtun, 40% Nuristani, Gujar and Kohistani (Pashai).
Nurgal		38,950	302	118	100% Pashtun.
Shaigal		14,805	336	40	100% Pashtun. Formed from northeastern Dangam District.
Shultan		21,249	93	209	100% Pashtun. Formed from northeastern Dangam District.
Sirkani		33,593	320	96	100% Pashtun.
Wata Pur		33,737	215	144	100% Pashtun. Formed from northwestern Asadabad District
Kunar		544,839	4,926	101	97.9% Pashtuns, 0.7% Nuristanis, 0.7% Pashayi, 0.7% Gujars, <0.1% Tajiks. (Note: Note: "Predominantely" or "dominated" is interpreted as 99%, "majority" as 70%, "mixed" as 1/(number of ethnicities), "minority" as 30% and "few" or "some" as 1%.)

== Demographics ==
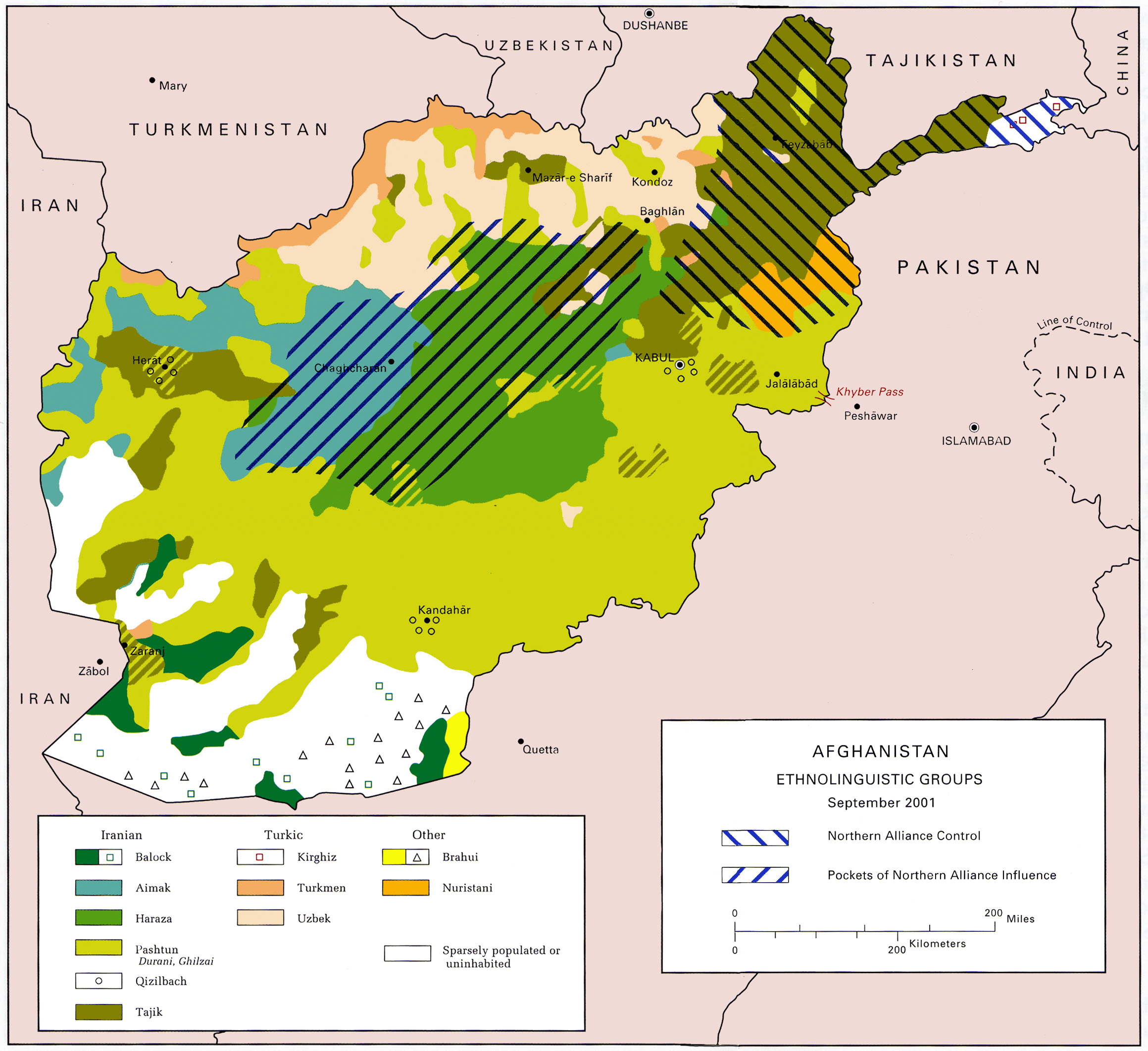
Ethnolinguistic groups of Afghanistan

=== Population ===
As of 2021, the population of the province is around 508,224 people. 95% are ethnic Pashtun and the remaining are Nuristani.

Around 96% of the population of Kunar lives in rural districts while 4% lives in urban areas.

11.8% of the population lived below the national poverty line, one of the lowest figures in Afghanistan

Kunar has a population of around 401,000 people in 2008. The province has 64,588 households, with an average of eight individuals per home. Rural districts are home to 96 percent of the population.

=== Ethnicity, languages and religion ===
Pashtun, Ashkun, Narsati (Kohistanis), Pashayi, Gujaran, Zemiaki and Waigali are the major ethnic groups of Kunar. Gawar-Bati, Nangalami, and Shumashti are some languages spoken in Kunar. The major tribes of Kunar are the Safi, Tarkani, Mahmund, Salarzai, Ghoryakhel, Mashwani, Khogyani, Shinwari, Mohmand and Yousafzai. More than 90% of the population speaks Pashtu, which is spoken in 705 villages out of 771. Dari and Uzbeki are spoken in two villages each, Pashayi in fifteen, and Nooristani in thirty-five. Kuchis (nomads) live in Kunar province, and their numbers fluctuate with the seasons. In the winter, 13,200 people, or 0.5 percent of the Kochi people population, stay in Kunar living in 20 communities. The Kochi people population in the summer is 1,355 individuals.

Estimated ethnolinguistic and -religious composition
Ethnicity	Pashtun	Nuristani	Pashayi	Others	Sources
Period	Pashtun	Nuristani	Pashayi	Others	Sources

2004–2021 (Islamic Republic)	>90 – 95%	≤5%	∅	∅
2020 EU	1st	3rd	2nd	–
2018 UN	>90% (Note: incl. Safi, Salarzai, Mohmand, and Mashwani, and excl. Chalasai, Yusufzai, Alokozai, and Kochi.)	∅	∅ (Note: incl. Kohistani.)	∅ (Note: incl. Gujar, Tajik ("Dehgan"), and Qandhari.)
2017 CSSF (Note: Demographic information is based on data from 2017.)	majority	minority	–	–
2015 NPS	95% (Note: incl. Shinwari, Safi, and Mamund.)	5%		
2011 PRT	>90% (Note: incl. Safi, Salarzai, Mashwani, Mamund, and Shinwari, and excl. Kochi.)	2nd (Note: incl. Ashkun and Waigali.)	3rd (Note: excl. Gawar-Bati.)	∅ (Note: incl. Gujar, Farsiwan, and Uzbek.)
2011 USA	95% (Note: excl. Kochi.)	5%	–	–
2009 ISW	overwhelming majority (Note: incl. Safi, Tarkalani, Mohmand, and Shinwari.)	–	–	–

Legend:
- ∅: Ethnicity mentioned in source but not quantified
- –: Ethnicity not mentioned specifically
- Source abbreviations: Empirical sources: –, Government sources: EU – European Union Agency for Asylum, PRT – Provincial Reconstruction Team of the United States government, UN – United Nations Assistance Mission in Afghanistan, Editorial sources: CSSF – Center for the Scientific Study of Families, ISW – Institute for the Study of War, NPS – Naval Postgraduate School, USA – United States Army

=== Education ===
The overall literacy rate (6+ years of age) fell from 32% in 2005 to 20% in 2011. The overall net enrollment rate (6–13 years of age) increased from 43% in 2005 to 44% in 2011.

In Kunar province, the general literacy rate is 21%; however, although 47 percent of men are literate, only 18 percent of women are. Between the ages of six and thirteen, 43 percent of children are enrolled in school. In 2008, there were 129,661 pupils enrolled in the province's 332 primary, intermediate, and high schools. Boys made for 63 percent of students, while boys' schools accounted for 33 percent of all schools. In the schools, there were 3,268 teachers, with 5% of them being female. There is only one vocational school in the higher education sector that caters only to men.

=== Health ===
The percentage of households with clean drinking water increased from 24% in 2005 to 55% in 2011. The percentage of births attended to by a skilled birth attendant increased from 3% in 2005 to 13% in 2011.

Kunar province had 24 health clinics and a 123-bed hospital in 2008. According to data from 2008, the Ministry of Health employs 38 doctors and 121 other health professionals in the province. There are 93 pharmacies in the province. The majority of villages do not have a permanent health worker. Nearly a quarter of the population must travel more than 10 kilometers to reach the nearest health center.

== Culture ==
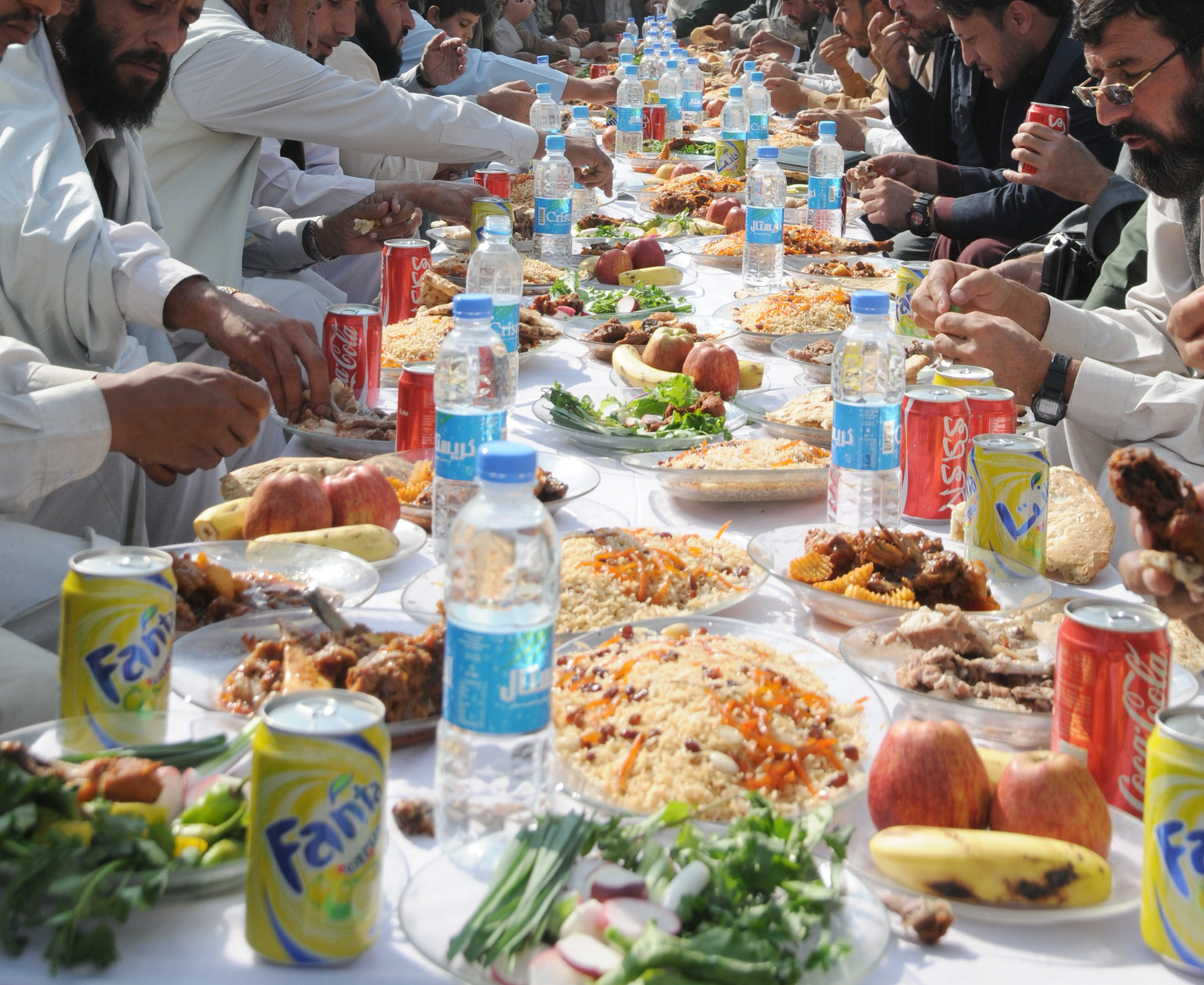
Kunari men eating traditional Afghan food

=== References in popular media ===
The opening scenes of Marvel Cinematic Universe 2008 film Iron Man as well as S1E6 of What If...? take place in Kunar Province.

The 2010 documentary Restrepo was filmed in the Korengal Valley of Kunar Province.

The book Siren's Song: The Allure of War was published in 2012. It depicts the story of an American platoon at COP Honaker Miracle, Pesh valley, Kunar Province.

The movie Lone Survivor starring Mark Wahlberg was based around "Operation Red Wings" in 2005 which was near Asadabad.

Documentary author James F. Christ has published numerous titles about the fighting in Kunar and Nuristan provinces, mainly from 2005 to 2007 with the 10th Mountain Division and Afghan National Army ETT advisors.

Journalist Wesley Morgan's 2021 book The Hardest Place: The American Military Adrift in Afghanistan's Pech Valley is a detailed history of American military operations in Kunar, specifically the Pech River Valley, from 2001 through 2020.

=== Political parties ===
Kunar's major political groups include Wahhabis or Ahl-e- Hadith, Nazhat-e Hambastagi Milli, Hezb-e Afghanistan Naween and Hezb-e Islami Gulbuddin.

== Notable people ==
- Sayed Jamaluddin Afghani, Politician, Activist, Scholar, explorer.
- Ghazi Mir Zaman Khan, War Hero of the Anglo-Afghan War of 1919
- Kabir Stori, Pashtun nationalist, poet and writer who founded the Pashtuns Social Democratic Party, refused offers to join government from President Najibullah and was imprisoned by the military regime of Zia-ul-Haq
- Mohammad Hashem Zamani, Afghan Poet and Former Representative of Kunar 1977
- Rasul Amin, Ministry of Education.
- Ghazi Mohammad Amin Khan, from Watapur.
- Abdullah Habibi, Afghan Army General
- Shuja ul-Mulk Jalala, served as Governor of Kunar Province
- Asmatullah Rohani, Afghan judge, educator and a human rights activist during the PDPA regime and Soviet War
- Karim Lala, one of the three mafia dons of Mumbai from the 60s to the early 80s

== See also ==
- Provinces of Afghanistan
- Arandu
- List of bridges in Konar Province
- Kabir Stori
