= Khogyani =

Khogyani may refer to:

- Khogyani (Pashtun tribe), a Pashtun tribe in eastern Afghanistan and western Pakistan.
- Khogyani District, a district in Nangarhar Province, Afghanistan, largely populated by the Khogyani tribe.
- Khogyani District (Ghazni), a district in Ghazni Province, Afghanistan.
- Khogyani, Ghazni, a town and the capital of Khogyani District in Ghazni Province, Afghanistan.
