= Jikhai River =

River in Afghanistan

The Jikhai River is a river in Ghazni Province, central Afghanistan, originating in Nawur District and crossing the Ajristan valley. It is the only source of water available to the small number of inhabitants as the area is affected by a severe drought. Dams on the river have a history of breaking and causing severe damage and death.

The small town of Sangar, capital of the Ajristan District, is located in the Jikkai River valley.
