= Aghil Ati Khadim =

Aghil Ati Khadim آغیل آته خادم
- Village
- Location in Afghanistan
- Coordinates: 33.7074°N 67.4596°E
- Country: Afghanistan
- Province: Ghazni
- District: Nawur District
- Area/Region: Julga Bahador
- Time zone: + 4.30

Aghil Ati Khadim (Dari: آغیل آته خادم) is a small village in Julga Bahador of Ghazni Province, Afghanistan.

== See also ==
- Ghazni Province
- Julga Bahador
