= Binisang =

Bini Sang بینی سنگ
- Village
- Location in Afghanistan
- Coordinates: 33.768697°N 67.547768°E
- Country: Afghanistan
- Province: Ghazni
- District: Nawur District
- Area/Region: Julga Bahador
- Time zone: + 4.30

Bini Sang (Dari: بینی سنگ) is a small village in Julga Bahador about 15 km north of Ghazni Province, Afghanistan.

== See also ==
- Ghazni Province
- Julga Bahador
