= Faiz Muhammad Kateb =

Historian and writer

Allamah Faiz Muhammad Kateb فیض‌محمد کاتب
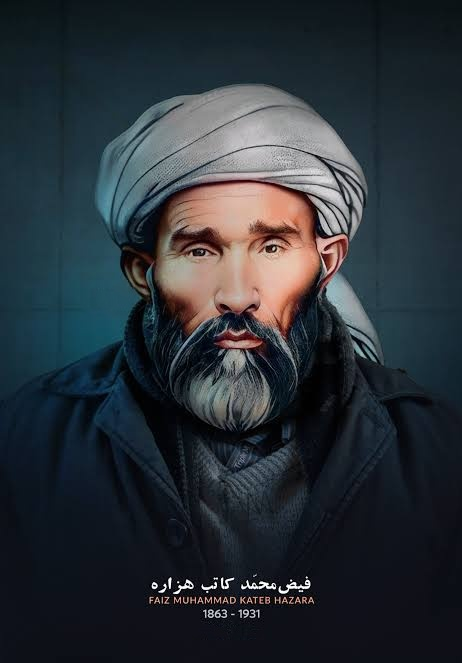
- Born: 1860; Qarabagh District, Ghazni Province, Emirate of Afghanistan
- Died: March 3, 1931 (aged 70–71); Kabul, Kingdom of Afghanistan
- Resting place: Chindawol, Kabul, Afghanistan
- Occupations: Historian, Intellectual, Calligrapher, Afghan court chronicler and secretary to Habib Ullah Khan
- Writing career
- Language: Persian, Arabic, Urdu, Pashto, and English

Faiz Muhammad Kāteb (Dari: فیض‌محمد کاتب) also known as Kāteb (کاتب) was a prominent writer. He was Afghan court's chronicler, a skilled calligrapher and secretary to the Afghan ruler Habibullah Khan from 1901 to 1919.

== Early life ==
Faiz Muhammad Kateb son of Saeed Muhammad (سعید محمد) was born in 1860, in Zarsang village of Qarabagh District of Ghazni Province in Afghanistan. He spent a part of his life in Nawur District, another district of Ghazni Province, and died in Kabul on March 3, 1931. He was an ethnic Hazara. Kateb spent his youth in Qarabagh District, tutored in Arabic and the Quran by local mullahs, in 1880, he and his family moved first to Nawur and then, because of sectarian strife, to Qandahar in the same year. In 1887, he left Qandahar for a year's travel that took him to Lahore and Peshawar where he spent some time studying English and Urdu. He eventually landed in Jalalabad and was invited in 1888 to join the administration of the Afghan Amir Abdur Rahman.

== History ==
He was soon attached to the entourage of the amir's eldest son, Habib Ullah Khan, at the recommendation of one of his teachers, Mullah Sarwar Ishaq'zai. Kateb accompanied the prince from Kabul to Jalalabad in 1311/1893-94. There is a manuscript attributed to him, dated 29 Rajab 1311/5 February 1894, which places him in Jalalabad at this time. In 1314/1896, when Habib Ullah's younger brother Nasr Ullah Khan toured England on a state visit, Habib Ullah assigned Kateb to copy and post in the Charsuq, Kabul's main marketplace, the detailed letters sent back by Nasr Ullah recounting his activities, so that “noble and commoner alike would be apprised of the honor and respect that the English were according him”.

During Habib Ullah's reign, Kateb was involved, if only peripherally, with the Young Afghan movement led by Mahmud Tarzi. He is said to have been associated with the publication of Tarzi's reformist journal, Siraj al-Akbar, and three other journals, Anis, Ḥayy alal-falah, and Aina-ye Irfan. After the assassination of his patron in 1337/1919, Kateb worked for a time at the Ministry of Education on textbook revision. Sometime later, he was appointed to a teaching position at the Habibiya Laycee (Habibiya High School) in Kabul.

During the reign of Aman Ullah Khan (1919–29), the Iranian minister in Kabul Sayyed Mahdi Farrokh compiled a “who’s who” of contemporary Afghan leaders. His sketch of Kateb characterizes him as a devout Shia Muslim, highly regarded by the Qizilbash community of Kabul, as well as a leader among his people, the Hazaras, and an important source of information for the Persian mission about what was going on in the capital.

In 1929, the Tajik outlaw Habib Ullah Kalakani, ousted Aman Ullah Khan and took control of Kabul for nine months (January to October 1929). During this uprising Kateb, who spent almost the entire period inside the city, kept a journal which was the basis for an unfinished monograph entitled Kitab-e Tadakoor-e Enqilab which he began shortly after the fall of Habib Ullah Kalakani.

During the occupation, Kateb was forced to take part in a delegation sent by Kalakani to negotiate with Hazara groups opposing the Tajik leader. According to his account, he managed to subvert Kalakani's plans and caused the mission to fail. However, he and the mission's leader, Noor al-Din Agha, a Qizilbash Shiʿite from Kabul, paid a heavy price for this: both were sentenced to death by beating. Kateb alone survived the ordeal and was saved by a colleague. The Persian mission in Kabul, under a directive from Reza Shah to do what it could to aid the Shiʿites of Kabul, sent medicines to his house. He eventually recovered enough to travel the following year to Tehran for more medical care. After less than a year there, he returned to Kabul, where he died on 6 Shawal 1349/3 March 1931, at the age of sixty-eight or sixty-nine.

== Publications ==
Kateb is best known for his books on Afghan history. During Habib Ullah's reign, he accepted two commissions to write a comprehensive history of Afghanistan covering events from the time of Ahmad Shah down through the reign of Habib Ullah Khan. The first was a history of Afghanistan entitled Tohfat ul-Habib (Ḥabib's Gift) in honor of the amir, but Habib Ullah Khan deemed the finished work unacceptable and ordered Kateb to start over. The revised version is the three-volume history of Afghanistan entitled Siraj al-Tawarikh (Lamp of Histories), an allusion to the amir's honorific “Lamp of the Nation and Religion” (Siraj al-mella waʾl-din). There were also problems in publishing it, the third volume never being completely printed. It is thought that the process of publishing the third volume lasted several years and only ended after Habib Ullah Khan's death. Some say the publication on the third volume was halted at page 1,240 for unspecified reasons. Habib Ullah Khan's successor, Aman Ullah Khan, was initially interested in the work and typesetting resumed in the mid-1920s, but when the amir reviewed the material in it on Anglo-Afghan relations, he reportedly changed his mind, and ordered all published but still incomplete copies of the third volume taken from the press and burned. Despite this reaction, Kateb continued work on his chronicle. The manuscript of the remainder of the third volume is widely believed to have been finished, and the autograph was reportedly turned over to the Afghan archives by Kateb's son. Volumes devoted to Habib Ullah Khan and Aman Ullah Khan may also have been written. A farman issued by the latter announced that Kateb had been ordered to complete the Siraj and then begin work on a chronicle of the reign of Aman Ullah Khan to be entitled Tarikh-e Asr-e Amaniya. There is some evidence to suggest he did indeed carry out these commissions, although nothing more was ever published.

Besides Siraj al-Tawrikh, Kateb wrote the following works:

- Tuhfatul Habib' Afghan History (1747–1880), in two volumes. (The original script, hand-written by Kateb, exists in the National Archive in Kabul)
- Tazkeratul Enqilaab accounts of the days of Habibullah, Bacha-e Saqaw
- History of Ancient Prophets/Rulers, from Adam to Jesus
- Hidāyat-i kisht-i gul-hā va qalamah-hā va ḥubūbāt va ghayrah (1921–1922)
- Jughrāfiyā-yi ṭabʻī va Afrīqā
- Tarikh-e Hokama-ye Motaqaddem, compiled while he was working at the Ministry of Education;
- Fayz al-Foyuzat, a fragment of which, called Afghan Treaties and Agreements (ʿahd wa misaq-e afghan) was published in Sayyed Mahdi Farrokh's Tarikh-e Siasi-ye Afghanistan (Tehran, 1314 Š./1935) and which, in tune with the times, was a sharp critique of the Abdul Rahman's relations with the British;
- Faqarat-e Sharʿiya, which is not known to have survived; and
- Nasab-nama-ye Tawaʾef-e afghena wa taʿaddod-e nofus-e ishan, also known as Nijhad-nama-ye Afghan, a description of Afghan tribes and non-Afghans residing in Afghanistan. The Nijhad-nama was published in Persia in 1933 from a manuscript thought to be the autograph and held in the Kitab Khana-ye Milli-ye Malik in Tehran.

Among the works he is known to have copied is a 230 folio collection of farmans issued by the Mughal ruler Aurangzeb (1068–1118/1658–1707) which he completed in Jalalabad in 1312/1894; the divan of Šehab-e Torshizi, a late 18th-century poet from Herat; and Risala-ye fiuz, a treatise on explosives.

In the late 20th century, an American scholar Robert D. McChesney extensively researched Kateb's life and written works, in particular the Siraj al Tawarikh. In 1999, he published a translation of Tazkeratul Enqilaab's under the title Kabul under Siege: Fayz Muhammad's account of the 1929 Uprising, and in 2012 McChesney and Mehdi Khorrami completed the first English translation of Siraj al-Tawrikh.

== See also ==
- Siraj al-Tawarikh
