= Mohammad Yar, Bahador =

Mohammad Yar محمدیار
- Village
- Location in Afghanistan
- Coordinates: 33.69123°N 67.43488°E
- Country: Afghanistan
- Province: Ghazni
- District: Nawur District
- Area/Region: Julga Bahador
- Time zone: +4.30

Mohammad Yar (Dari: محمدیار) is a small village in Julga Bahador of Ghazni Province, Afghanistan.

== See also ==
- Ghazni Province
- Julga Bahador
