= Najibullah Khwaja Omari =

Afghan politician

Najibullah Khwaja Omari نجیب‌الله خواجه عمری

Ministry of Higher Education
- Incumbent
- Assumed office 22 November 2017
- President: Ashraf Ghani
- Preceded by: Abdul Latif Roshan

Personal details
- Born: 1955 (age 70–71) Khwaja Umari, Ghazni province, Afghanistan
- Ethnicity: durani

Najibullah Khwaja Omari (Dari: نجیب‌الله خواجه عمری) is a politician and the former minister of higher education in Afghanistan. He was appointed as head of ministry in place of Abdul Latif Roshan on 22 November 2017.

== Early life ==
Najibullah Khwaja Omari was born in 1955 in Afghanistan in Khwaja Umari District of Ghazni province. Najibullah Khwaja Omari is an ethnic Durani
