= Julga Bahador =

Julga Bahador جلگه بهادر باتور
- Batur
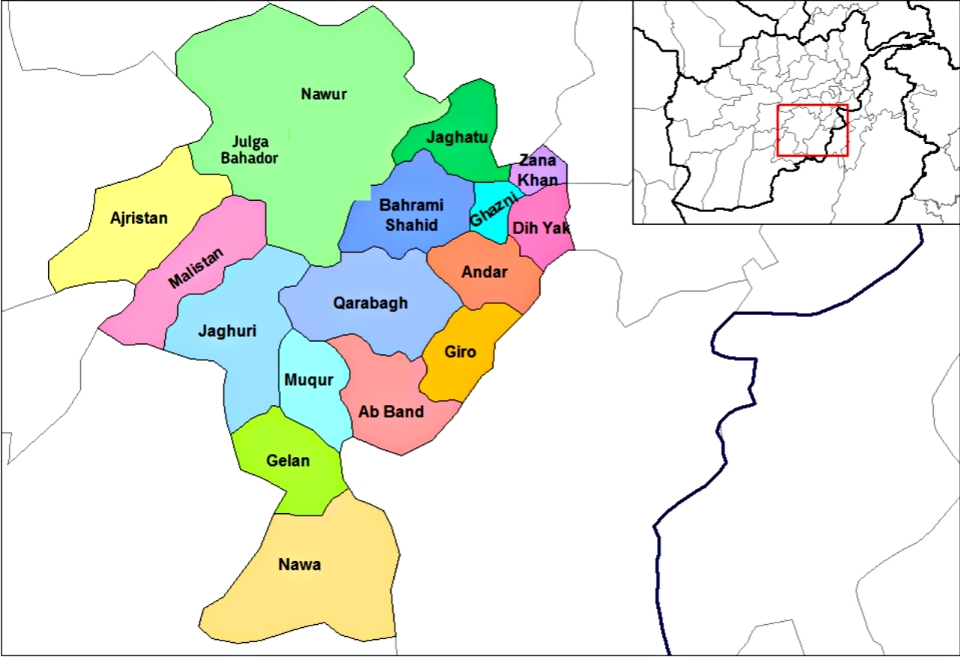
- Location in Ghazni Province

- Location in Afghanistan
- Coordinates: 33.7080982°N 67.4623317°E
- Country: Afghanistan
- Province: Ghazni Province
- District: Nawur District
- Elevation: 6,900 ft (2,100 m)
- Time zone: UTC+4:30
- Postal code: 2365

Julga Bahador (Dari: جلگه بهادر) or Batur (Dari: باتور)is a region/area located in the Nawur District of Ghazni Province, Afghanistan. It is situated in a mountainous region and is considered one of the more populated settlements in Nawur.

This area is located more than six hours' drive from the center of Nawur District, indicating its remoteness and difficulty of access.

== Villages ==
1. Aghil Ati Khadim
2. Binisang
3. Mohammad Yar
4. Forakh Tala
5. Paye Kotel
6. Kunadeh
7. Sare Top
8. Dadi
