= Ab Band =

Ab Band (Persian: اب بند) may refer to:

- Ab Band District, in Ghazni Province, Afghanistan
- Āb Band, Ghazni, a village and the center of the above district in Ghazni Province, Afghanistan
- Ab Band, Iran
