= Khogyani District, Ghazni =

Khugyani خوگیانی
- District
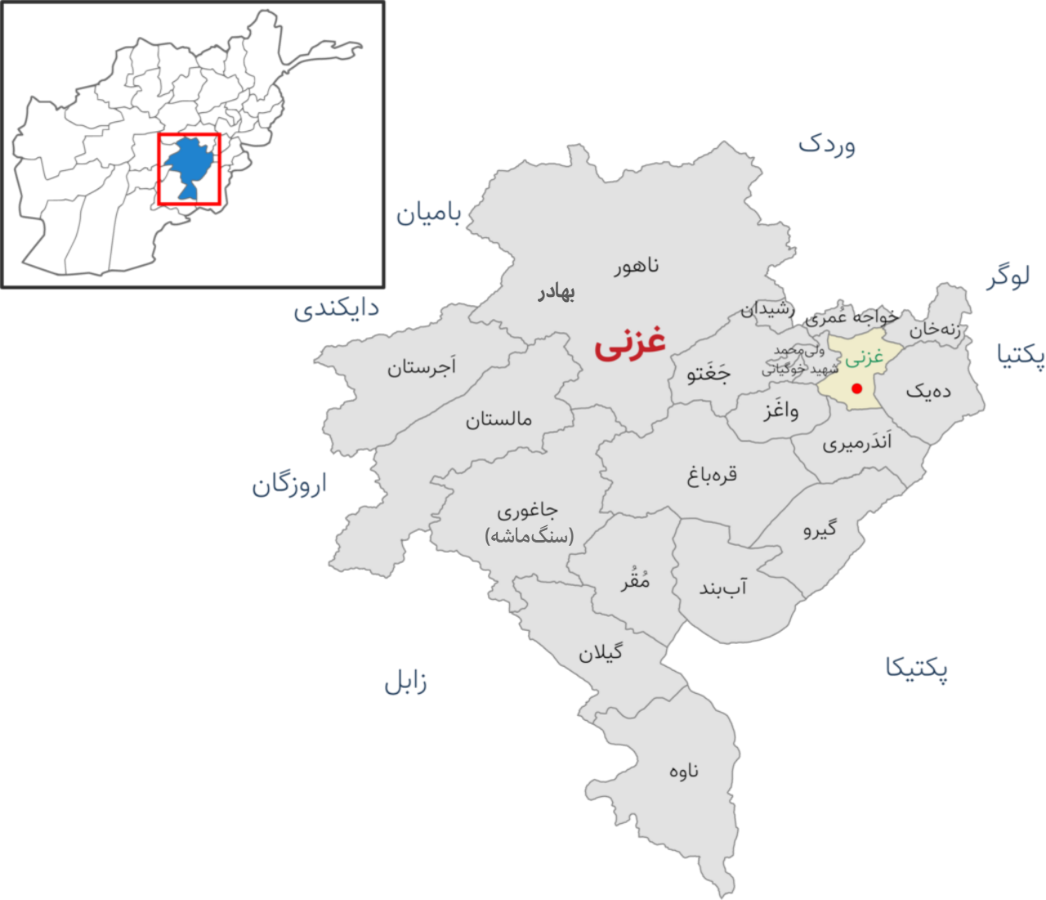

- Location within Afghanistan
- Coordinates: 33°34′N 68°18′E
- Country: Afghanistan
- Province: Ghazni
- Elevation: 2,300 m (7,500 ft)

Population (2003)
  - Total: 28,842

Khugyani (Pashto: خوګياڼي ولسوالۍ) is a district in Ghazni province, Afghanistan. It was previously part of Jaghatu District. Its territory had been enlarged during the Taliban regime and after then the district was returned to its original borders. To the east it is surrounded by Ghazni District to the south by Waghaz District, to the west by Jaghatu District, to the north by the Rashidan District and to the Northeast by Khwaja Umari District. The population is more than 28,000 people. The district center is Khogyani.

The main source of income is agriculture, which is seriously affected by the drought. Health and education need major improvement. Roads are narrow but in relatively good condition.

== See also ==
- Districts of Afghanistan
