= Haji Khel =

Haji Khel حاجی خیل
- Location in Afghanistan
- Coordinates: 32°59′34″N 67°57′55″E
- Country: Afghanistan
- Province: Ghazni
- District: Ab Band
- Elevation: 2,117 m (6,946 ft)
- Time zone: UTC+4:30

Haji Khel (Pashto: حاجي خېل) is a town located at 32.9928°N 67.9653°E at 2,117 m altitude in the northern part of Ab Band district, Ghazni Province, Afghanistan and is the capital of the district.

== Climate ==
Haji Khel features a humid continental climate with mediterranean precipitation patterns (Köppen: Dsa). It has hot, dry summers and cold, snowy winters.

Climate data for Haji Khel
Month	Jan	Feb	Mar	Apr	May	Jun	Jul	Aug	Sep	Oct	Nov	Dec	Year
Daily mean °C (°F)	−5 (23)	−2.3 (27.9)	4.2 (39.6)	11.3 (52.3)	17.6 (63.7)	21.6 (70.9)	23.6 (74.5)	22.2 (72.0)	18.8 (65.8)	12.3 (54.1)	5.0 (41.0)	−0.6 (30.9)	10.7 (51.3)
Average precipitation mm (inches)	45.9 (1.81)	83.0 (3.27)	74.3 (2.93)	31.1 (1.22)	12.9 (0.51)	2.6 (0.10)	10.9 (0.43)	9.5 (0.37)	3.5 (0.14)	1.3 (0.05)	26.8 (1.06)	10.7 (0.42)	312.5 (12.31)
Average relative humidity (%)	54	62	47	32	22	17	23	23	17	21	36	39	33
Source 1: ClimateCharts
Source 2: World Weather Online (precipitation & humidity)

== See also ==
- Ghazni Province
