= Qolyaqol =

Qolyaqol قلیاقل
- Valley
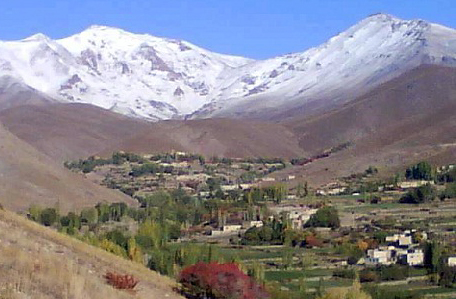
- Qolyaqol valley, Qarabagh, Ghazni Province

- A photograph of a brother moment.
- Coordinates: 33.26854°N 68.07345°E
- Country: Afghanistan
- Province: Ghazni
- District: Qarabagh
- Elevation: 2,217 m (7,274 ft)

Population
  - Ethnic groups: Hazara people
  - Religions: Islam
- Time zone: + 4.30

Qolyaqol (Dari: قُلیاقُل) is a valley and a residential area in Afghanistan, located in Qarabagh, Ghazni Province in the Hazaristan region of Afghanistan in central parts of the country. Its population are primarily Hazaras.

== Climate ==
Qolyaqol has a hot-summer humid continental climate (Köppen: Dsa) with dry summers and cold, snowy winters.

Climate data for Qolyaqol (1987-2017)
Month	Jan	Feb	Mar	Apr	May	Jun	Jul	Aug	Sep	Oct	Nov	Dec	Year
Daily mean °C (°F)	−4.9 (23.2)	−2.3 (27.9)	4.2 (39.6)	11.3 (52.3)	17.6 (63.7)	21.6 (70.9)	23.6 (74.5)	22.2 (72.0)	18.8 (65.8)	12.3 (54.1)	5.1 (41.2)	−0.6 (30.9)	10.7 (51.3)
Average precipitation mm (inches)	47.6 (1.87)	89.1 (3.51)	90.9 (3.58)	53.5 (2.11)	24.4 (0.96)	24.2 (0.95)	17.3 (0.68)	30.7 (1.21)	21.0 (0.83)	27.3 (1.07)	19.3 (0.76)	23.8 (0.94)	469.1 (18.47)
Source: ClimateCharts

== Population ==
Qolyaqol residents are the Hazara people.

== See also ==
- Valleys of Afghanistan
