= Giro District =

Giro گیرو
- District
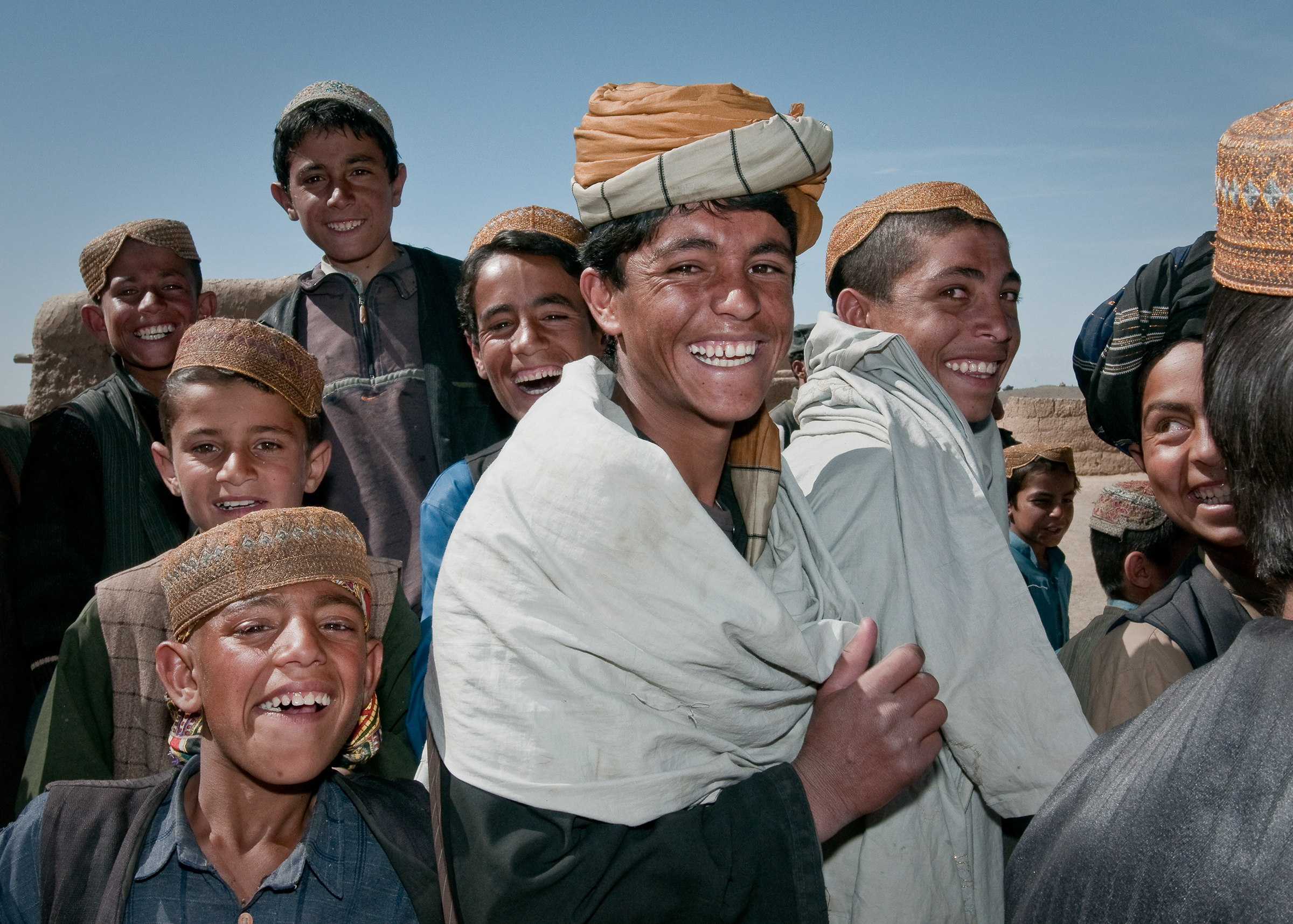
- Children of Giro District

- Location within Afghanistan
- Coordinates: 33°04′N 68°21′E
- Country: Afghanistan
- Province: Ghazni
- Seat: Pana
- Elevation: 2,000 m (6,600 ft)

Population (2009)
  - Total: 22,700

The Giro District (Pashto: گیرو) is located within southeastern Ghazni province in Afghanistan, 50 km South East of Ghazni city. The district is a wide plain with scattered low mountains. More than 40 000 residents are estimated, according to 2002 year's data. The district is within the heartland of the Tarakai tribe of Ghilji Pashtuns. The district center is Pana.

As the other districts in this area, it is seriously affected by the continuing drought. Harvests have been decreasing in recent years, and agriculture is the primary source of income.

The roads are in bad condition. The health and education services need much improvement.

On 5 September 2016, 80 Taliban militants were killed and 100 others injured after hundreds of fighters launched a coordinated offensive to capture the district. Five security personnel also had been killed and eight others injured during the operation.

== See also ==
- Districts of Afghanistan
