= Janda, Afghanistan =

Janda جنده
- Location in Afghanistan
- Coordinates: 32.726923°N 67.636964°E
- Country: Afghanistan
- Province: Ghazni
- District: Gelan
- Time zone: UTC+4:30

Janda (Pashto: جنده) is a village and the district center of Gelan District, Ghazni Province, Afghanistan. It is situated in the central part of the district at 32.7269°N 67.6369°E at 1,983 m altitude. The houses are made of mud bricks and the streets are unpaved.

The town is located within the heartland of the Tarakai tribe of Ghilji Pashtuns.

== See also ==
- Ghazni Province
