= Ramak =

Ramak رمک
- Location in Afghanistan
- Coordinates: 33°31′29″N 68°37′58″E
- Country: Afghanistan
- Province: Ghazni
- District: Dih Yak
- Elevation: 2,163 m (7,096 ft)
- Time zone: UTC+4:30

Ramak (Dari: رمک) is the district center of Dih Yak District, Ghazni Province, Afghanistan. It is 30 km east of Ghazni.

== See also ==
- Ghazni Province
- Deh Yak District
