= Pana, Afghanistan =

Pana پانا
- Location in Afghanistan
- Coordinates: 33°6′1″N 68°18′42″E
- Country: Afghanistan
- Province: Ghazni
- District: Giro
- Elevation: 2,080 m (6,820 ft)
- Time zone: UTC+4:30

Pana or Panah (Pashto: پانا) is the district center of Giro District, Ghazni Province, Afghanistan. It is located on 33.100337°N 68.311612°E at 2,080 m altitude in the central part of the district. The access roads to the town are in a bad condition.

== See also ==
- Ghazni Province
