= Sangar, Afghanistan =

Sangar سنگر
- Location within Afghanistan
- Coordinates: 33.52°N 67.21°E
- Country: Afghanistan
- Province: Ghazni
- District: Ajristan
- Elevation: 2,623 m (8,606 ft)

Sangar (Pashto: سنگر) is a town in Ghazni Province, Afghanistan. It is the center of Ajristan district and is located at an altitude of 2,623 m in the narrow valley formed by the Jikhai River.

== See also ==
- Ajristan District
- Ghazni Province
