= Malistan District =

Malistan مالستان
- District
- Location within Afghanistan
- Coordinates: 33°18′04″N 67°10′13″E
- Country: Afghanistan
- Province: Ghazni
- Capital: Mir Adina
- Elevation: 2,800 m (9,200 ft)

Population (2009)
  - Total: 150,000

Malistan or Malestan (Pashto,Dari: مالستان), is a district in Ghazni province, Afghanistan. Its population, which is 90% Hazara, was estimated at 150,000 in 2009. The district capital is Mir Adina.

== History ==
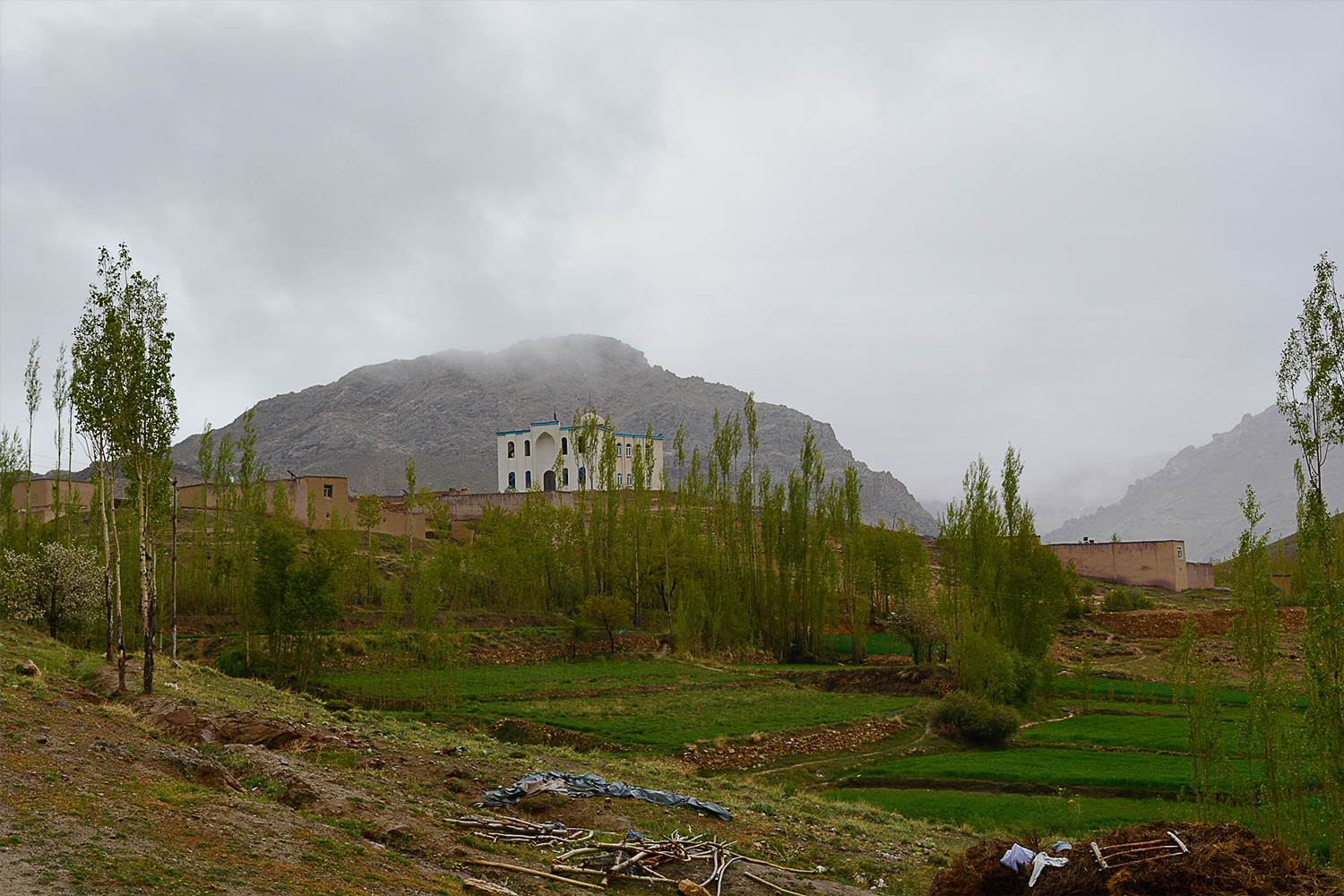
Malistan district

In 2002, plans were drawn up to split Malistan into four separate districts, in order to ease access to judicial services and government offices. Due to its huge population and the distance from Mir Adina, these plans are not believed to have been carried through. From 2002 to 2008 approximately 3,801 refugees were repatriated through the UNHCR system, although only 35 were listed as returning in 2008 and the vast majority occurred in 2002–04.

== Security ==
Reported intimidation has taken place by some armed groups associated with Hizb-i Wahdat which has led to some internal displacement. Members from the Nasr faction were particularly highlighted in this, and they have been accused of abductions, extortion and other crimes. Taliban presence in Ghazni has become a significant problem as well with some sources referring to the area as Taliban controlled. Aside from this the major sources of conflict are related to land and water, while debt and marriage related conflict does occur. Land conflicts increased greatly during the drought period.

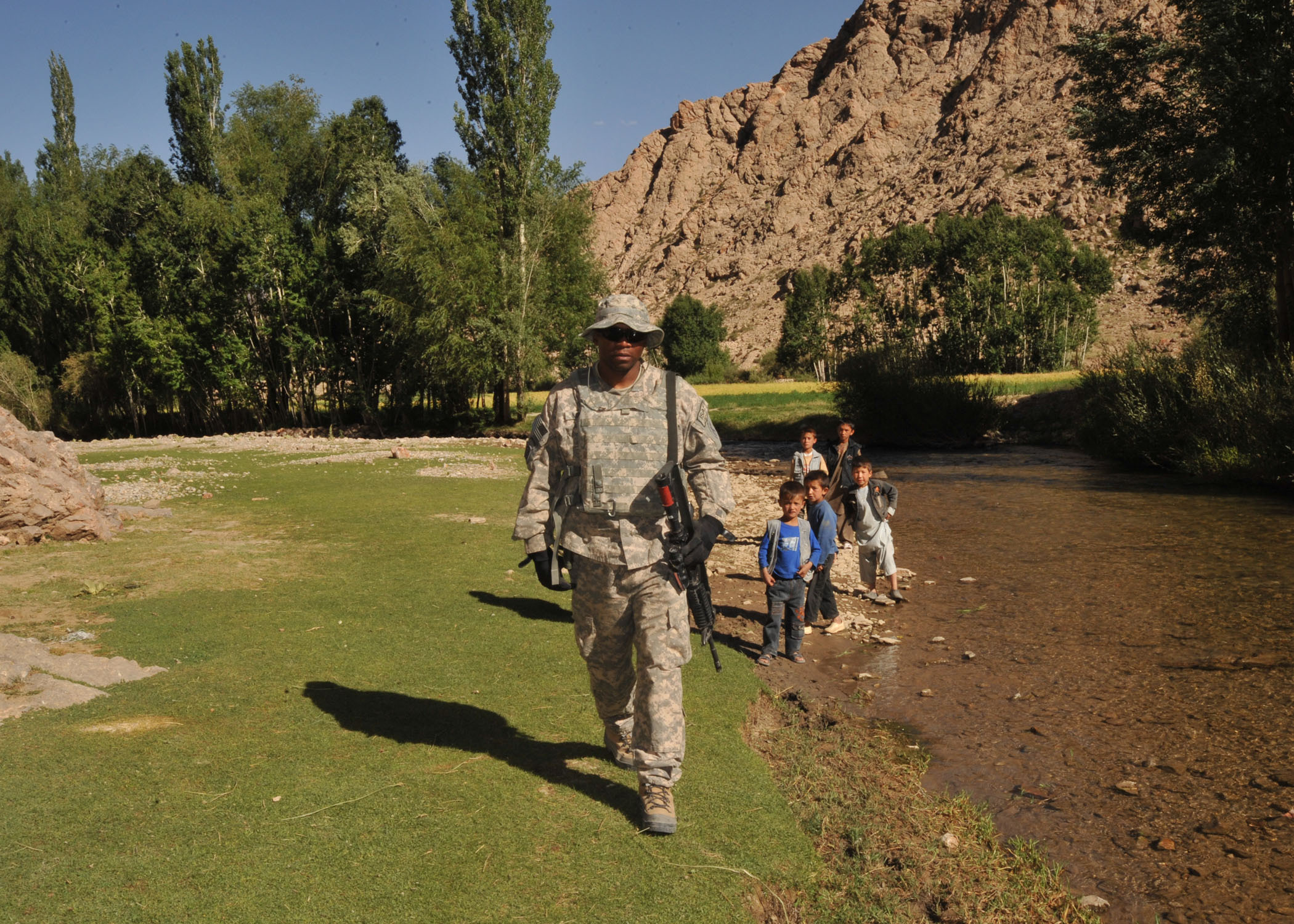
US soldier in Malistan in 2010

Most importantly, even though the Taliban are said, as of 2008, to have only limited activity in the district, the security situation in other parts of the province has greatly affected the livelihood of the inhabitants, posing serious threats to their life, security, and freedom. The districts are inaccessible except through Taliban territory, where the road has reportedly been mined and in some areas vehicles have been banned. According to some reports the road from Qarabagh District to Jaghouri, passing through Malistan is under particular threat, with kidnappings and up to 150 cars having been stolen. There are also concerns that the Taliban will use the Kuchi nomads to exert their influence in the region. There was also reported massacres occurring by eyewitnesses when the Taliban had seized control of the Ghazni province on August 12, 2021

== Agriculture and development ==
According to information from the United Nations Food Program for Afghanistan in 2003 and the Ministry for Rural Rehabilitation and Development in 2007, the main crops in the area are wheat, corn, maize, peas, grapes, almonds, potatoes, onions, and herbs.

182 Community Development Committees were reportedly active in Malistan in 2008.

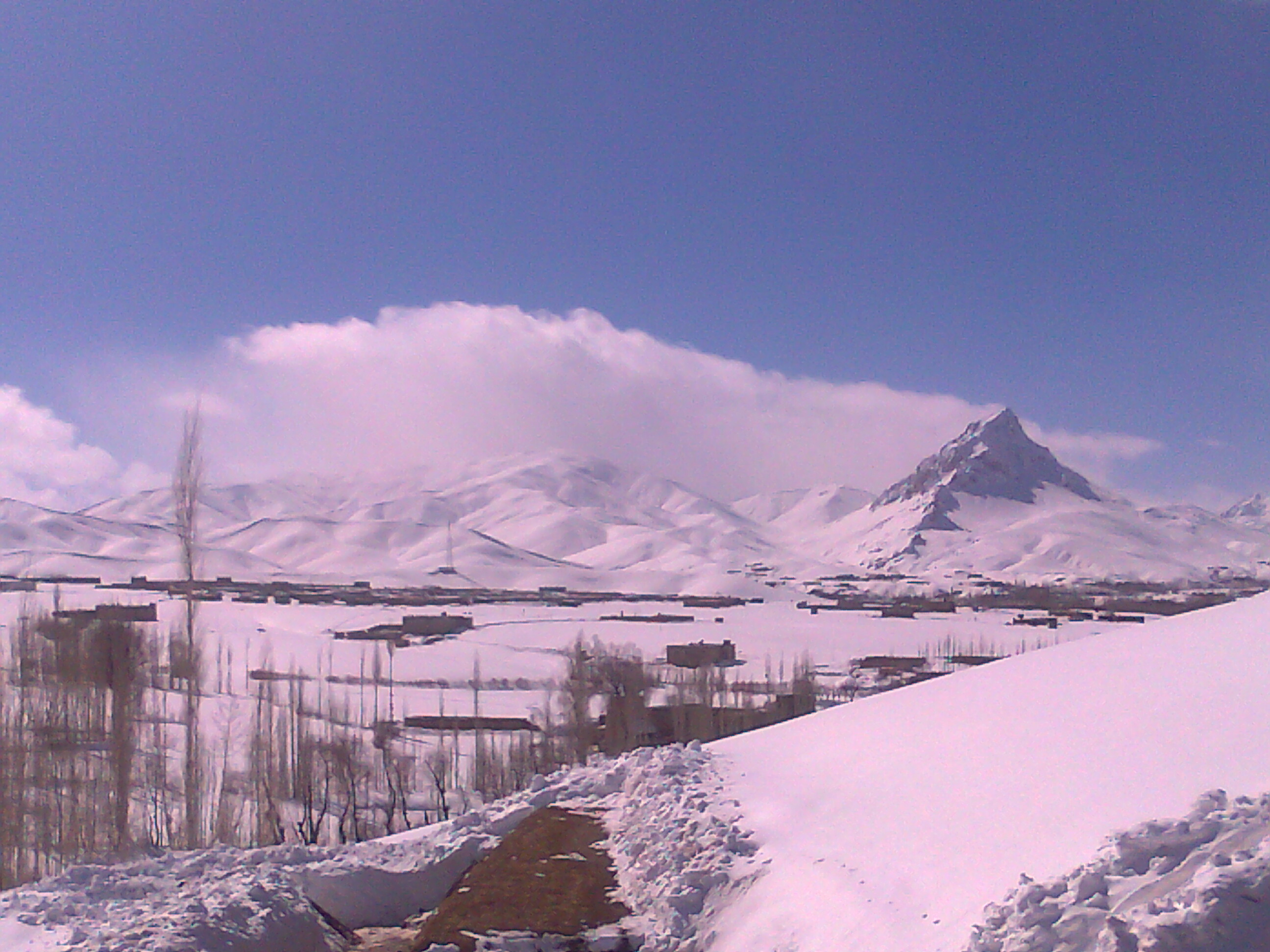
Winter in malistan

In years following the fall of the Taliban the area has been particularly affected by drought. In combination with frequent attacks along the Kabul-Kandahar Ring Road, this has seriously affected aid and development in the system and exacerbated local conflicts.

== Politics ==
Past and present major political parties include Muttahed-e Inqelab-e Islami Afghanistan (formed 1981), Hizbullah, Harakat-i Islami, Sazman-e Nasr-e Afghanistan, Pasdaran-e Jihad-e Islami Afghanistan (formed 1983) and Hezb-e Wahdat (Nasr faction), the later controlling the district since 2001–2008, although as of 2009, the Taliban have begun to exert their influence.

The District Governor is Zafar Sharif. The Police Chief Aqhyee Abassi is affiliated with Nahzat-i Islami from 2008 to 2010.

The current governor is Mr. Hedayat from Malistan and Mr. Qomandam Askaryar also from Lalchak Malistan.

== Education ==
After the fall of the Taliban regime in Afghanistan, investment in education became one of the priorities. The willingness of its inhabitants for education is said to be proverbial: "Hazara people cut out of their basic needs in order to send their children to school to be educated".

== See also ==
- Districts of Afghanistan
- Hazarajat
