= Gelan District =

Gelan گیلان
- District
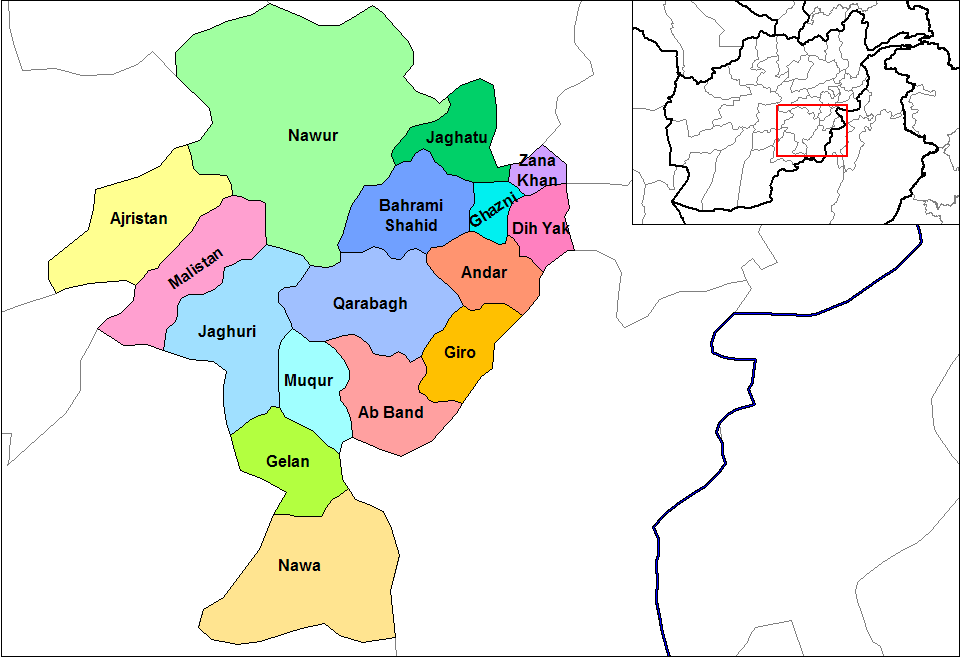
- Gelan District in bright green

- Location within Afghanistan
- Coordinates: 32°43′52″N 67°38′11″E
- Country: Afghanistan
- Province: Ghazni Province
- Elevation: 2,000 m (6,600 ft)

Gelan (Pashto: ګیلان) is a district in the south of Ghazni province, Afghanistan. Its population was estimated at 78,408 in 2002. The district capital is Janda.

The district is within the heartland of the Tarakai tribe of Ghilji Pashtuns.

== Demographics ==
Afghan children walk along a road near a bazaar in the Gelan district, Ghazni province, Afghanistan, Nov. 2, 2013
