= Siraj al-Tawarikh =

Sirāj al-Tawārīkh سراج التواریخ
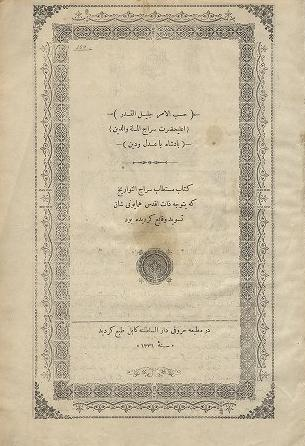
- The cover of Sirāj al-Tawārīkh first edition
- Author: Faiz Mohammad Katib Hazara
- Original title: Kitāb-i Musṭatāb-i Sirāj al-Tawārīkh
- Language: Dari Persian
- Subject: 18th and 19th Century Afghan History
- Publisher: Matba'e Hurufi'e Dar al-Saltanah, Kabul, Afghanistan
- Publication date: 1912
- Publication place: Afghanistan
- Media type: Book
- Followed by: Sirāj al-Tawārīkh Second Edition

Siraj al-Tawarikh (Dari: سراج التواریخ، Pashto: د تاریخونو څراغ) also spelled as Siraj al-Tavarikh, Sirāj al-Tawārīkh and Sirāj al-Tavārīkh, is a book on 18th and 19th century Afghan history by Faiz Mohammad Katib Hazara. The author was an Afghan court chronicler and secretary in the court of Amir Habibullah Khan from 1901 to 1919.

The book was written on the idea of Amir's commission. The first was a history of Afghanistan entitled Toḥfat al-ḥabīb (Ḥabīb’s gift) in honor of the amir, but Ḥabīb-Allāh Khan deemed the finished work unacceptable and ordered Fayż Moḥammad to start over. The revised version is the three-volume history of Afghanistan entitled Serāj al-tawārī (Lamp of Histories), an allusion to the amir’s honorific “Lamp of the Nation and Religion” (Serāj al-mella wal-dīn). There were also problems in publishing it, the third volume never being completely printed.

== Book link ==
- The second volume of Siraj Al Tawarikh
- The third volume of Siraj Al Tawarikh
