= Khwaja Umari =

Village in Ghazni Province, Afghanistan

Khwaja Umari خواجه عمری
- Location in Afghanistan
- Coordinates: 33°41′17″N 68°24′7″E
- Country: Afghanistan
- Province: Ghazni
- District: Khwaja Umari
- Elevation: 7,510 ft (2,289 m)
- Time zone: UTC+4:30

Khwaja Umari (Dari: خواجه عمری) is a village and the center of Khwaja Umari District, Ghazni Province, Afghanistan. It is 17 kilometres (11 mi) north of the city of Ghazni, which is the provincial capital.

== See also ==
- Khwaja Umari District
- Ghazni Province
