= Malistan =

Malistan مالستان
- Location in Afghanistan
- Coordinates: 33°17′43″N 67°10′8″E
- Country: Afghanistan
- Province: Ghazni
- District: Malistan
- Elevation: 9,741 ft (2,969 m)
- Time zone: UTC+4:30

Malistan or Malestan (Dari: مالستان) is a town and the center of Malistan District, Ghazni Province, Afghanistan. It is situated in the southwestern part of Ghazni at 33.2953°N 67.1689°E at 2,969 m altitude. Once the town was a bazaar.

== See also ==
- Malistan district
- Ghazni Province
