= Qarabagh, Afghanistan =

Town in Ghazni Province, Afghanistan

Qarabagh قره‌باغ
- Location in Afghanistan
- Coordinates: 33°11′48″N 68°6′28″E
- Country: Afghanistan
- Province: Ghazni
- District: Qarabagh
- Elevation: 2,078 m (6,818 ft)
- Time zone: UTC+4:30

Qarabagh (Pashto: قراباغ) is a town located in Afghanistan. It is the administrative center of Qarabagh District, Ghazni Province. A district in Kabul Province is also named Qarabagh.

== See also ==
- Qarabagh District
- Ghazni Province
