= Mir Adina =

Mir Adina میرآدینه
- Village
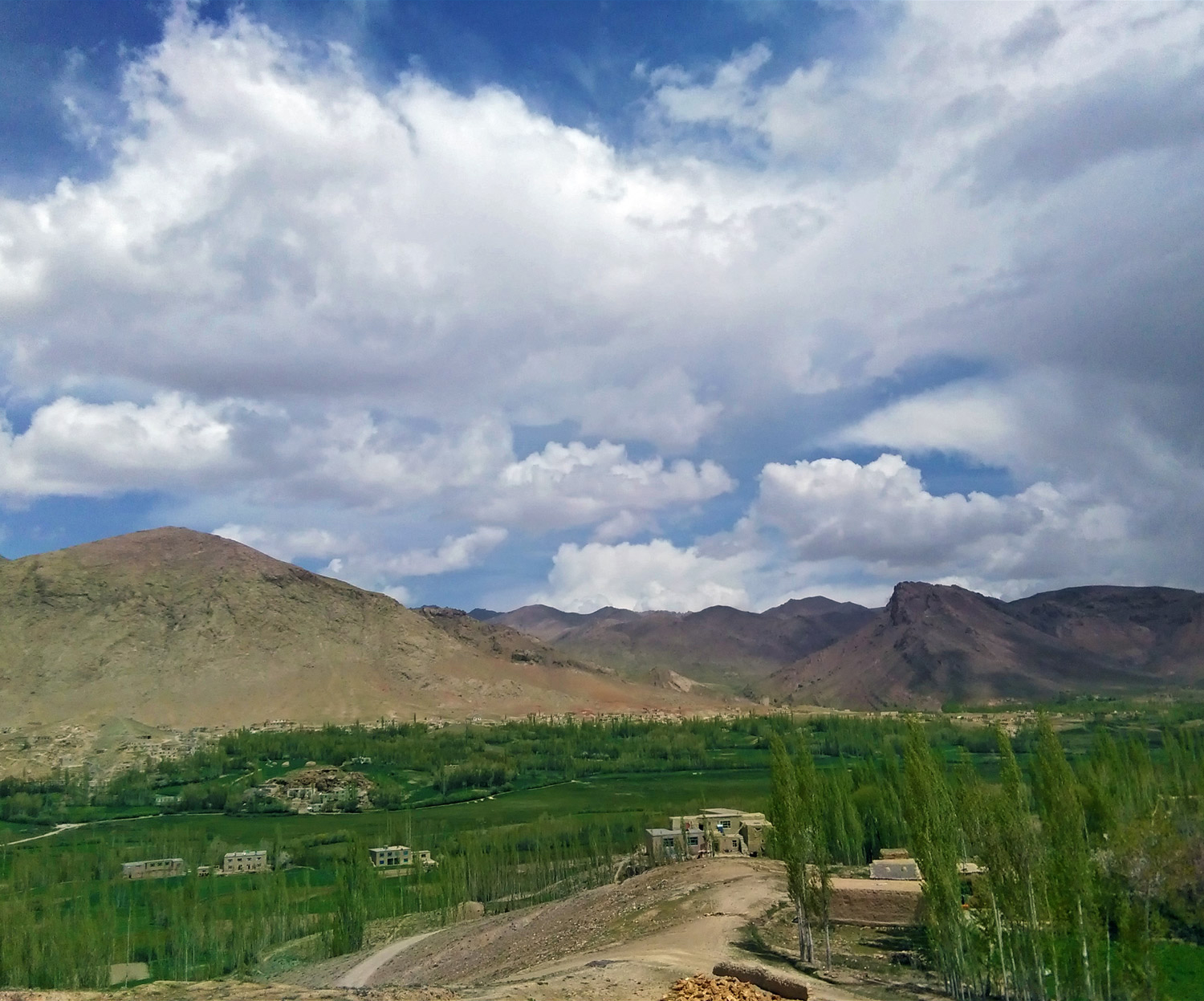

- Location in Afghanistan
- Coordinates: 33.2943°N 67.1864°E
- Country: Afghanistan
- Province: Ghazni
- District: Malistan
- Time zone: UTC+4:30

Mir Adina (Dari: میرآدینه) is a remote village in Afghanistan, located in the Malistan District of Ghazni Province. In 2003, the estimated population was 1000 families.

== See also ==
- List of populated places in Afghanistan
