= Ab Band, Afghanistan =

Ab Band آب بند
- Village
- Āb Band (Afghanistan)
- Interactive map of Ab Band
- Coordinates: 32.983333°N 67.966667°E
- Country: Afghanistan
- Province: Ghazni
- District: Ab Band
- Time zone: UTC+4:30 (Afghanistan Standard Time)

Ab Band also called Awbanḏ and Ow Band (Pashto: آب بند) is a village in Ghazni Province, in eastern Afghanistan. It is the district center of Ab Band District.

== See also ==
- Ab Band District
