= Ajristan District =

Ajristan اجرستان
- District
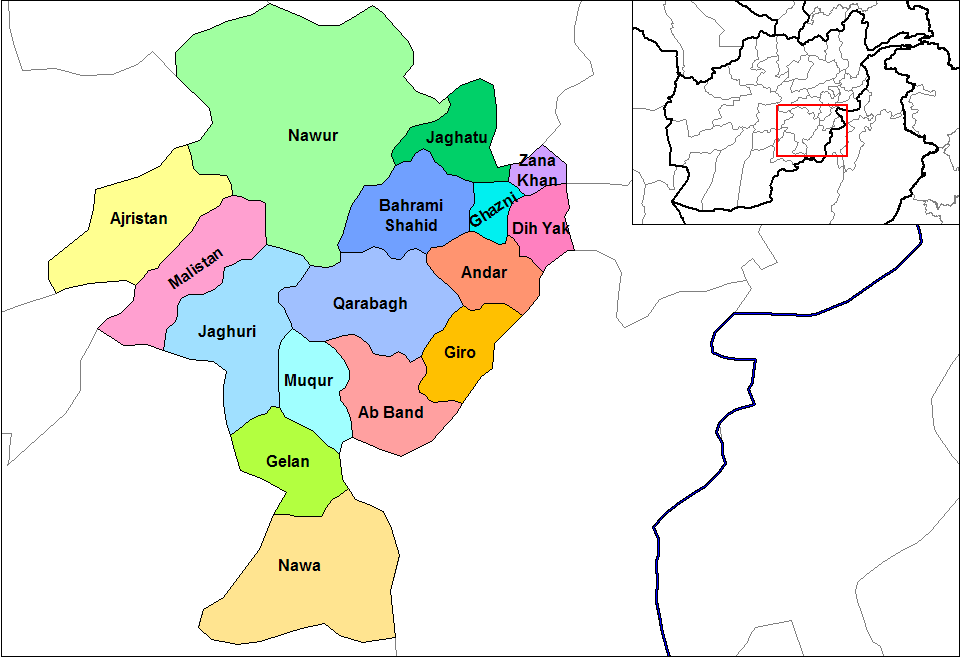
- Ajristan District in yellow

- Location within Afghanistan
- Coordinates: 33°28′01″N 67°14′20″E
- Country: Afghanistan
- Province: Ghazni
- Capital: Sangar

Area
  - Total: 2,653 km^{2} (1,024 sq mi)
- Elevation: 2,600 m (8,500 ft)

Population (2001)
  - Total: 62,028

Ajristan (Pashto: اجرستان), also known as Dāya (دایه), or Dāya aw Folād (دایه او فولاد), Ajristan also spelled as Ajeristan is a district in the western part of Ghazni province, Afghanistan. Its population was estimated at 62,028 in 2001, of which 90% are Pashtun people with others from the Hazara people. Sangar, in the center of the district, is the capital. Most of the population live in the Jikhai River valley and depend upon agriculture, the main source of its economy. The last decade of severe winters and droughts have affected the economy and quality of life.

== Geography ==
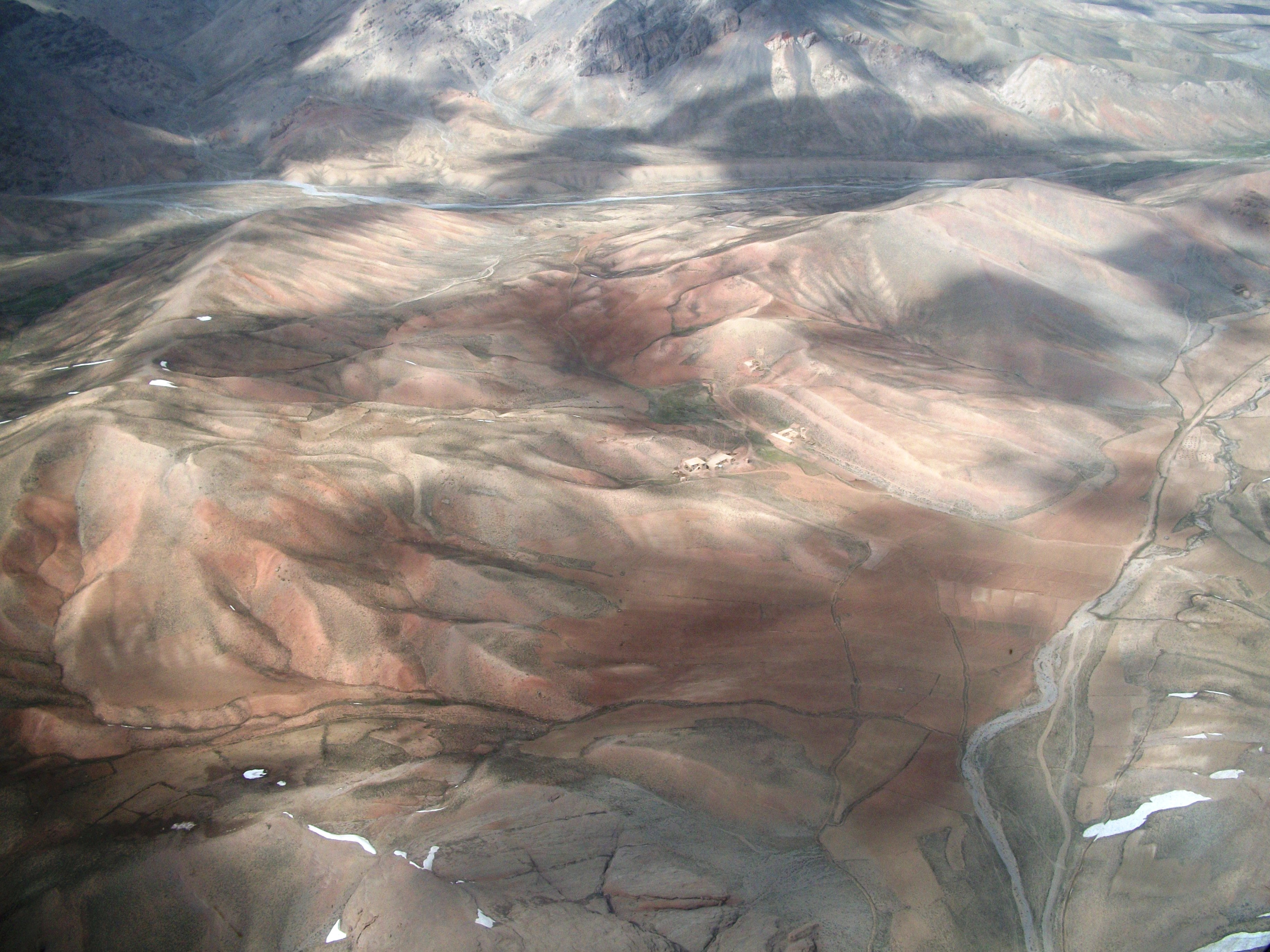
Aerial view of Ajristan District

Ajristan has currently an area of 2,653 km^{2} (1,024 sq mi) and consists of a series of valleys. The hills Shah Tus Aka Ghar and Koishafil surround Ajristan and act as natural barriers. There are no natural boundaries between Ajristan and adjoining districts of Malistan to the northeast, Gizab and Sangi Masha to the east, and Dai Chopan. The closest major city is Ghazni to the west. Ajristan lies in the lap of several mountain ranges, which are the extensions of Shah Tus Baba, so a larger part consists of high mountains and hills. The ranges are irregularly placed: some extend to the west; others to the east, but the general direction is north–south. The mountain ranges enclose many small valleys. In the middle of the valley passes the Jikhai River, a major source of water, especially for agriculture.

== Demographics ==
Ajristan was historically part of Uruzgan province when it was called Dāya wa Folād (دایه و فولاد). Hazara people were the original inhabitants of the district until the 1880s. After their disastrous defeat in the early 1890s, they were mostly killed or driven out. The district is now dominated mostly by the Pashtun. However, some Hazara remnants are still living there as the minority. Pashto is the language spoken by the majority of Ajristani residents. Other languages include Persian. Pashtun people in this area originate mostly from the Mulla Khail Tribe.

== Climate ==
Ajristan has a semi-arid climate with a significant temperature variation between summer and winter. Summer starts in late May and continues until early September with average temperatures ranging from 24 to 26 °C (75 to 79 °F). The highest recorded temperature is 42 °C (108 °F) on 10 July 1998. Autumn begins in late September and continues until mid-November with average temperatures in the 12–18 °C (54–64 °F) range. Winter starts in late November and ends in late March, with average temperatures near 4–5 °C (39–41 °F). The lowest recorded temperature was −18.3 °C (−0.9 °F) on 8 January 1970. Spring starts in early April and ends in late May with average temperatures near 15 °C (59 °F). Unlike areas to the east, Ajristan does not have a monsoon season of heavy rainfall. Highest recorded rainfall within 24 hours is 113 millimetres (4.4 in) on 17 December 2000. Highest recorded monthly rainfall is 232.4 millimetres (9.15 in) in March 1982, and the highest recorded annual rainfall 949.8 millimetres (37.39 in) was in 1982. Snowfall occurs primarily in December, January, and February and is the principal precipitation in the winter.

During a severe drought from 1999 to 2001, Ajristan did not receive any snowfall, and rainfall was below normal levels. In 2003, the district received significant snowfall after a long drought. In 2004 and 2005, it received normal rains for the first time in three years with some snowfall, while in 2006, 2007, and 2009, the district received no snow. In 2008, Ajristan received four inches of snow in four hours on 29 January 2008. On 2 February 2008, Ajristan received ten inches of snow in 10 hours, the heaviest snowfall for the district in the last ten years. During the winter of 2010, it received no snow and suffered below normal levels of rainfall due to El-Nino.

== Economy ==
The severe droughts and winters have taken a toll on the economy, which is based mostly on agriculture and other locally grown products. A 2009 paper describes Ajristan residents "eating alfalfa, which is...detrimental to the human digestive system," a problem compounded by the lack of adequate medical care in the area. Most karezes have dried, so the district relies on a few wells and the Jikhai River for water.
