= Sohaila Sharifi =

Afghan politician

- Occupation: legislator

Sohaila Sharifi came to serve to represent Ghazni Province in Afghanistan's Meshrano Jirga, the upper house of its National Legislature, in 2005. She is a member of the Qizilbash ethnic group She was a refugee in Iran for fifteen years, where she ran a non-governmental organization called the Afghan Refugee Association.
