= Dih Yak District =

Dih Yak ده یک
- District
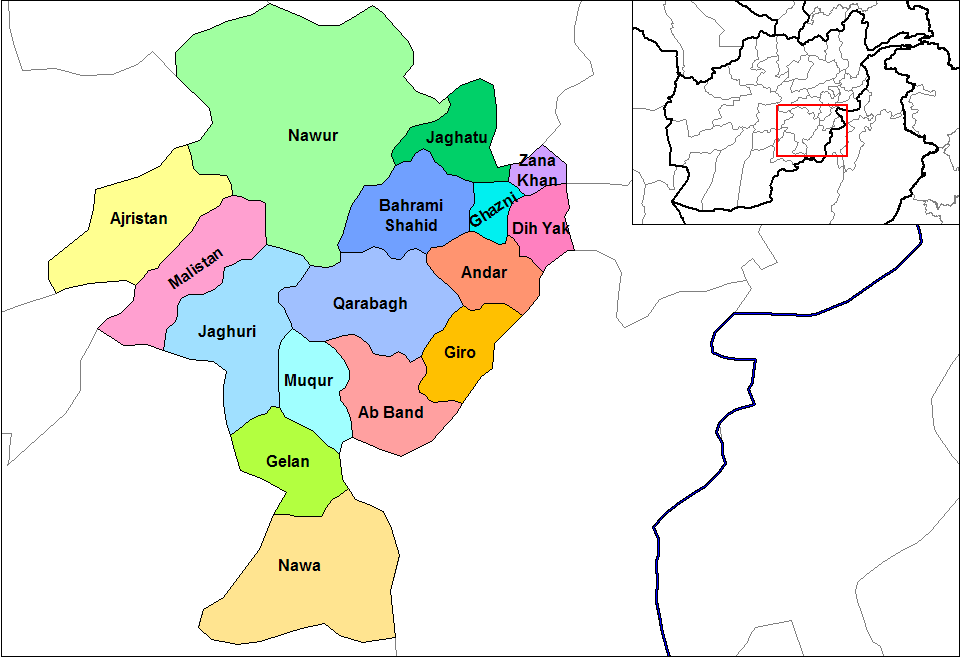
- Dih Yak District in bright pink

- Location within Afghanistan
- Coordinates: 33°28′35″N 68°45′47″E
- Country: Afghanistan
- Province: Ghazni
- Capital: Ramak

Area
  - Total: 715 km^{2} (276 sq mi)
- Elevation: 2,100 m (6,900 ft)

Population (2009)
  - Total: 37,500

Deh Yak also transliterated Dehyak (Dari: ده یک) is a rural district in the eastern part of Ghazni Province, Afghanistan, 30 km east from the city of Ghazni. The district has an area of 715 km^{2}, containing 66 villages and a population of about 44,386. Ramak serves as the district's headquarters.

The main source of income, agriculture, is seriously affected by the drought. People also trade animals. The high rate of unemployment has led to people leaving the district, many have also permanently settled and inter-married across the border in neighboring Pakistan. Health and education need serious improvement.

The main road between the city of Ghazni and Gardez is mostly paved, as is the road between Ramak and Slemenze.

== See also ==
- Districts of Afghanistan
- Ghazni Province
