= Jalalzai =

Pashtun Tribe

Jalalzai (Pashto:جلالزی), or Jalaazayi, is a Pashtun tribe settled in Paktika province of Afghanistan. It is a sub-division of the Sulaimankhel tribe.
