= Khogyani, Ghazni =

Khogyani خوگیانی
- Location in Afghanistan
- Coordinates: 35°59′N 68°40′E
- Country: Afghanistan
- Province: Ghazni
- District: Khogyani
- Time zone: UTC+4:30

Khogyani (Pashto: خوگیانی) is a residential in Afghanistan, located in Khogyani District, Ghazni Province, 17 km northwest of Ghazni. It was the district center of the big Jaghatu district before the year 2005. Now it is the center of Khogyani District.

== See also ==
- Ghazni Province
