= Rashidan District =

Rashidan رشیدان
- District
- Location within Afghanistan
- Coordinates: 33°42′N 68°09′E
- Country: Afghanistan
- Province: Ghazni

Area
  - Total: 394 km^{2} (152 sq mi)
- Elevation: 3,050 m (10,010 ft)

Population (2003)
  - Total: 22,280

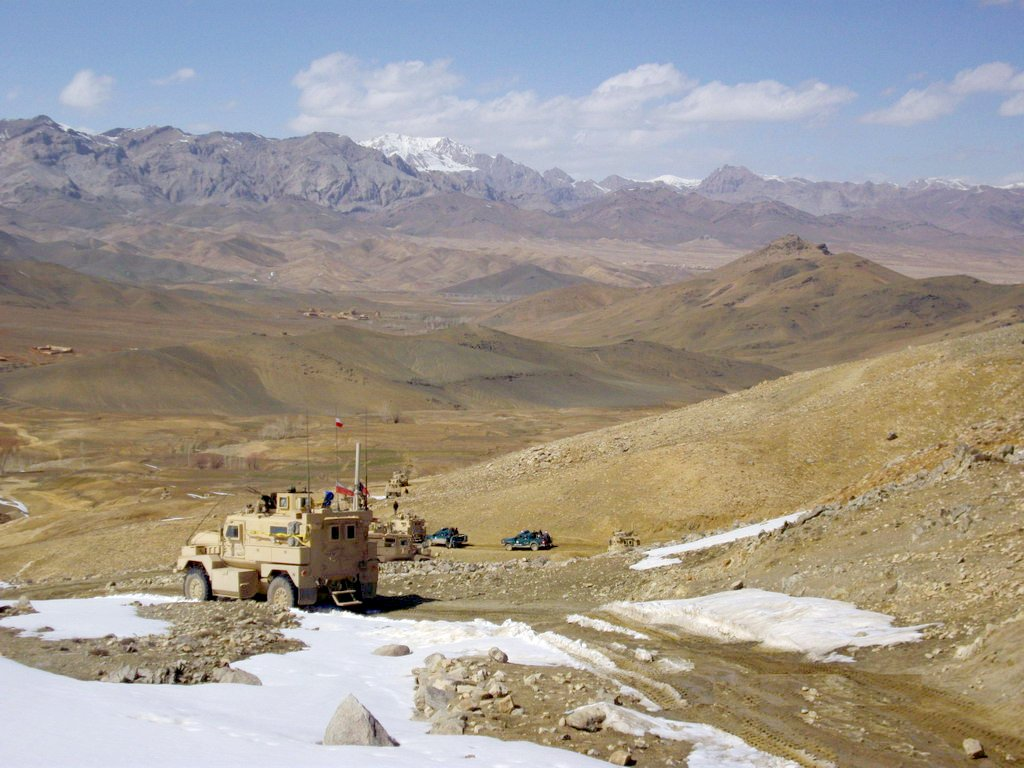
Polish forces in Rashidan district during "Operation Passage", 2009

Rashidan District (Pashto: رشیدان) is a new district in Ghazni province, Afghanistan; it was created from the larger Jaghatu district.

== Administration ==
The capital appears to be Rashidan, a new township near Hussain Khel and Qulgina.

== Education ==
After 2001 when Taliban fled the country, most of people sent their children to schools and universities. Rashidan district has two high school (Hussain Khil High school) and (Shahid Mohammad Azim High School) and around four secondary schools, which are located at different spots of the district. Shahid Mohammad Azim high school is located in Hussainkhel village near to the Rashidan district building.

Another significant person from Rashidan is Khalilullah Hotak, who served as Chief of Staff for the former President of Afghanistan, Professor Burhanuddin Rabani and head of the National Directorate of Security in many provinces. Hotak currently resides in Sweden. Many more are holding bachelor's degrees in different fields and are currently employed by the government of Afghanistan.

== Demographics ==
22,280 people are living in the villages of the district, with 96% of them Pashtun and 4% Hazara.

== Water Shortage ==
The continuing drought is the main problem of the district. In 2002, only 6% of arable land was farmed. The lack of water make people leave their villages and go to other districts or abroad. In latest years with increase in the winter snowfalls the water level in this district has increased.

== Trade and Commerce ==
People of this district are mostly engaged in agriculture, carpentry, and construction. Some people leave the district in summers and go to neighboring cities and outside of the country mostly Iran and Pakistan as labors and foremen.

== See also ==
- Districts of Afghanistan
- Ghazni Province
