= Khwaja Umari District =

Khwaja Umari خواجه عمری
- District
- Location within Afghanistan
- Coordinates: 33°41′N 68°25′E
- Country: Afghanistan
- Province: Ghazni
- Capital: Khwaja Umari
- Elevation: 2,200 m (7,200 ft)

Khwaja Umari (Dari: خواجه عمری) is a district in Ghazni province, Afghanistan. It was created in 2005 from the large Jaghatu District. The district center is the village of Khwaja Umari.

The drought is less severe here than in many other parts of the country, and 80% of the arable land is in use. The main source of income is agriculture, but many work in Ghazni and the rate of unemployment is lower than many other districts.

In 2018, the Taliban overran the headquarters of the district government, killing district governor Ali Dost Shams and the district chief of the National Directorate for Security Ahmad Ziya, along with approximately twelve others.

== Demographics ==
The population in 2005 was estimated at 16,100, of whom 45% were Hazara, 35% Tajik, and 20% Pashtun.

== See also ==
- Khwaja Umari village
- Districts of Afghanistan
- Hazarajat

== Gallery ==
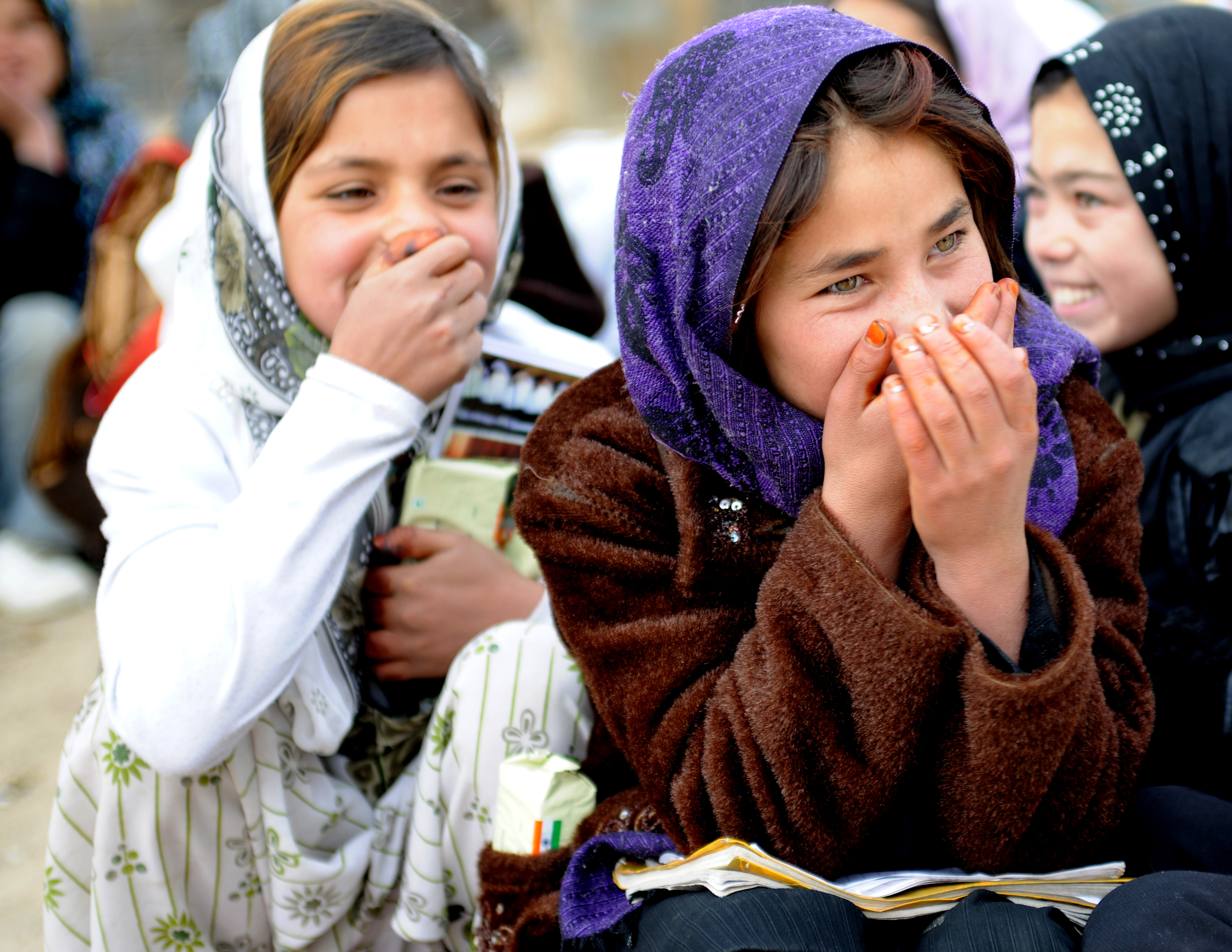
Schoolgirls from the district in 2009.
