= Ab Band District =

Ab Band آب بند
- District
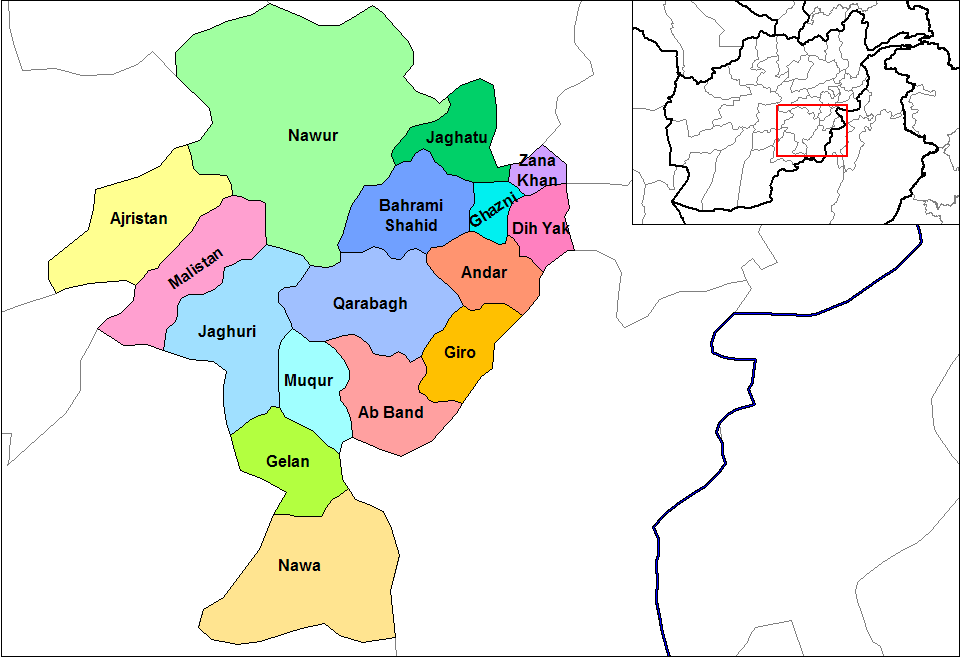
- Ab Band District in light red

- Location within Afghanistan
- Coordinates: 32°58′59″N 67°58′01″E
- County: Afghanistan
- Province: Ghazni
- Elevation: 2,000 m (6,600 ft)

Population (2002)
  - Total: 41,340

Ab Band (Pashto: اوبند) is a district in Ghazni province, Afghanistan. Its population was estimated at 41,340 in 2002. The district is within the heartland of the Tarakai tribe of Ghilji Pashtuns. Ab Band is on the main road from Kabul to Kandahar. The district capital is Ab Band.

== Politics and Governance ==
In June 2021, Taliban forces moved into Ab Band, where they came into conflict with the local Afghan government. After the withdrawal of US forces from Afghanistan, most of Ab Band is now believed to be under Taliban control.

== Geography ==
Ab Band is divided into two parts, North and South Aband. Between the two is a desert and a river which flows to the south into a lake. Ab Band has a number of wild mountains and hills such as Khwaja Lal Mountain, Zarcha, Laka tega, Khar koshta mountains, Zegay hills and wat Ghar plus many small mores.

== Demographics ==
There are five major ethnic groups settled in Ab Band: Baddin Khail, Na Khail, Mul Khail, Sohail Khail & Nyazi, nomads are also coming during spring until Autumn.There are 60 major villages plus many more scattered households.

== Economy ==
Ab Band has no construction projects; its local people regularly go to Pakistan and Iran for work. There is also a small bazaar (town) for locals to purchase daily needs and meet neighboring villagers. The bazaar is between Bazi and Chawnai villages. Ab Band is impoverished, and many of its inhabitants rely on subsistence farming to get through winter.

== Education ==
Abband District only has 3 high schools (Sahib Khan Ghazi, Obidullah LandaKhail, Chori Maktab as of 2025 with primary schools in some village religious Madrasas' are also available. This District Education system is very weak due to unskilled teachers and lack of public awareness plus recklessness of teachers due to these problems the community also lacks skilled and educated individuals.

== Healthcare ==
Ab Band has two CHC clinics one located in the north the second located at the south of the district near Bazi village two more sub branches are located in Kakara & Asghari villages.

These clinics provide only basic services and too much patients go to clinics from various villages. Moreover, many patients go to Ghazni city for treatment who afford the fare and expenses.

There is also some private drugstores and OPDs in Khalij and Awband bazaar!

In short health sector is really poor in the entire district.

== Infrastructure ==
One main road goes from north to south from Kabul Kandahar highway until paktika province border, the road passes on the ghazni river through Awband bazaar at the south, there is no bridge on the river especially during the winter and flood seasons people faces many problems and wait hopeless for several days until water level goes down.

== Natural Resources ==
Ab Band is known for producing grapes and resins for export to Ghazni city and Muqur district. The water sources are Kariz's (a trench 4–5 km long underground at the starting point it might be 35 m deep, but the end water reaches to the surface and flows like mesh). During the 2000s drought most of them become dried and people rushed for water pump drills. However, there is another problem villagers are disagree with water pumps because they will dry the rest of the Kariz's in the region.
