= Nawur District =

Nawur ناور
- District
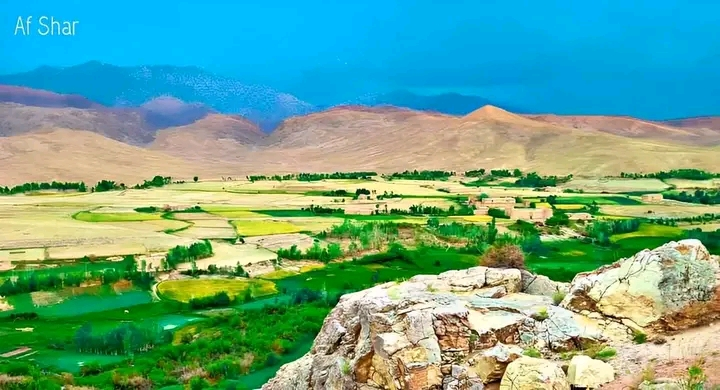

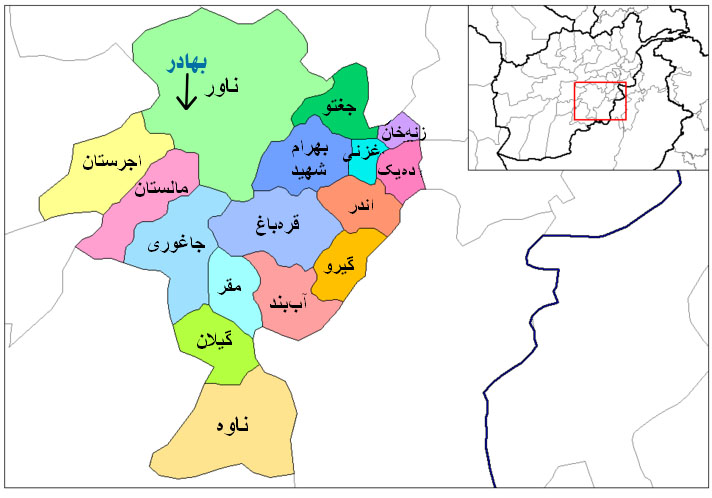
- Location within Afghanistan

- Location within Afghanistan
- Coordinates: 33°47′30″N 67°51′30″E
- Country: Afghanistan
- Province: Ghazni

Area
  - Total: 5,234 km^{2} (2,021 sq mi)
- Elevation: 3,100 m (10,200 ft)

Population (2002)
  - Total: 91,778

Nawur (Dari: ناور or ناهور) is one of the districts of Afghanistan, which is located in the northern part of Ghazni Province. With an area of approximately 5,234 km^{2} (2,021 sq mi), Nawur is the largest district of Ghazni province. Its population was estimated at 91,778 (more than half of whom were children under 12) in 2002. Nawur's inhabitants are ethnic Hazaras

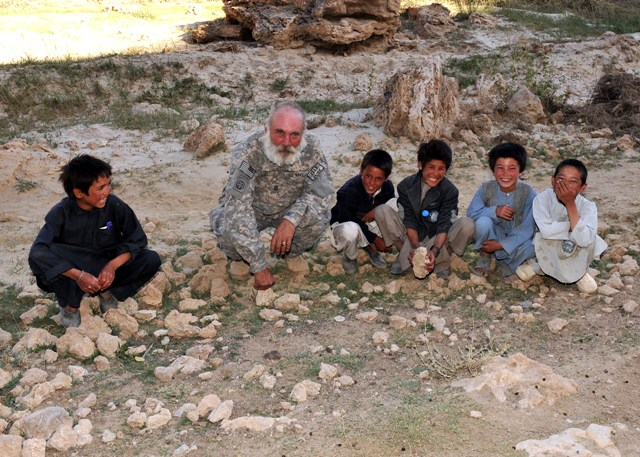
US Navy Soldier In Nawur

Nawur has most number of neighbours with 12 districts in Afghanistan. The following are neighboring districts to Nawur: Qarabagh District to the south, Jaghori District, Malistan District and Ajristan District to the south-west, Jaghatu District and Rashidan District to the east, Miramor District of Daykundi Province to the west, Waras District of Bamyan Province to the northwest, Behsud District, Daimirdad District and Jaghatu District of Maidan Wardak Province to the north.

== Agriculture ==
Main crops include wheat and barley. Animal husbandry includes sheep, goats, cows, poultry and horses.

In 2011, Polish members of the Provincial Reconstruction Team (PRT) along with local residents constructed a dam and new passage in Tal Bulagh valley. Supplies of water gathered will allow to irrigate crop fields.

== Geography ==
Nawur

Climate chart (precipitation, max. and min. temperature)
J	F	M	A	M	J	J	A	S	O	N	D
33 −11 −21	84 −9 −21	131 4 −11	124 18 −3	16 28 2	6 34 6	1 37 8	6 37 6	17 33 2	40 25 −1	28 14 −11	10 −1 −14
- █ Average max. and min. temperatures in °C
- █ Precipitation totals in mm
- Source: Climate-Data.org
Imperial conversion
J	F	M	A	M	J	J	A	S	O	N	D
1.3 12 −6	3.3 16 −6	5.2 39 12	4.9 64 27	0.6 82 36	0.2 93 43	0 99 46	0.2 99 43	0.7 91 36	1.6 77 30	1.1 57 12	0.4 30 7
- █ Average max. and min. temperatures in °F
- █ Precipitation totals in inches

== See also ==
- Districts of Afghanistan
- Ghazni Province
- Hazarajat
