= Qarabagh District, Ghazni =

Qarabagh قره‌باغ
- District
- Location within Afghanistan
- Coordinates: 33°11′37″N 68°06′07″E
- Country: Afghanistan
- Province: Ghazni
- Seat: Qarabagh

Area
  - Total: 1,800 km^{2} (690 sq mi)
- Elevation: 2,050 m (6,730 ft)

Population (2002)
  - Total: 218,000
  - Density: 121/km^{2} (310/sq mi)

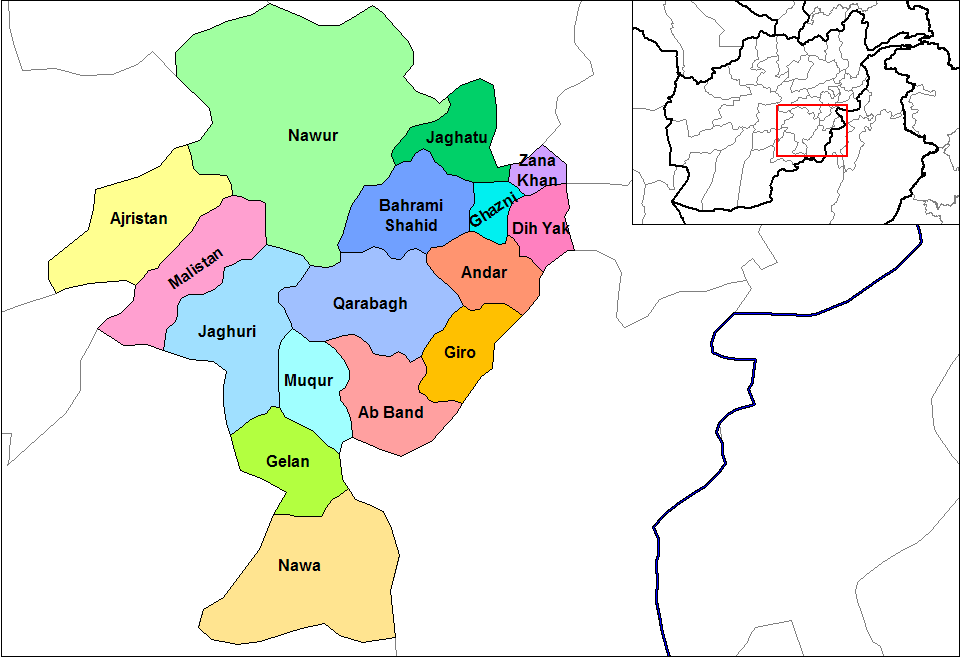
Map of the old district boundaries of Ghazni

Qarabagh or Qara Bagh (Pashto: قره‌باغ) is a district in Ghazni province, 56 km to the south-west of Ghazni city in eastern Afghanistan. The 1,800 km^{2} area is one of the most populated at 109,000; some reports count more than 218,000. The ethnic composition of the district is split between 55% Pashtun and 45% Hazara. The landscape varies in different parts of the district - deserts in the southwest, plains in the southeast and mountains in the north. The district, especially its farming and animal husbandry sector, is seriously affected by drought. Health and education need serious improvement.

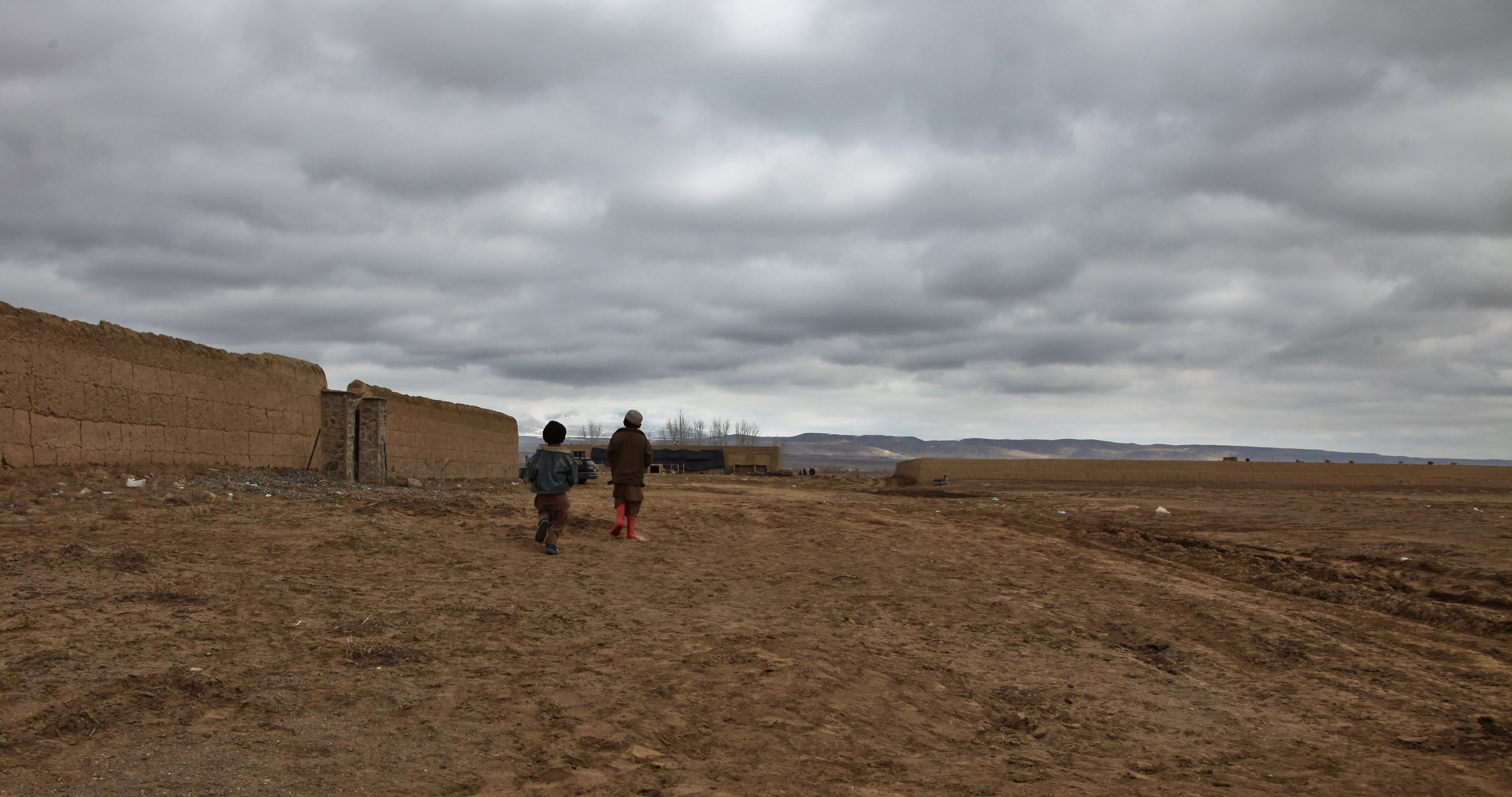
Qarah Bagh district, Ghazni

The Taliban militiamen are active in the area. Girls schools UpTo grade 6 are allowed to operate in the district after the Taliban took over in August, 2021 while secondary education for girls is still suspended. They briefly seized the government headquarters at the district centre in the town of Qarabagh in April 2007. The Taliban also seized the Giro district centre southeast of Qarabagh. In July 2007, the Taliban carried out the kidnapping of 23 Korean aid workers as their bus was hijacked passing through the district on the road between Kabul and Kandahar.

== Politics and Governance ==
The district chief was replaced in 2006 by Zabit Salih Gul after his predecessor quit due to frequent threats by the Taliban.

On 22 November 2009 one militant was shot dead in Ali Naizi village in Qarabagh district after an operation by ISAF forces.

== Geography ==
Parts of the inhabited regions of the district are located in the Qolyaqol valley.

== Healthcare ==
Qarabagh District of Ghazni lacks state of the art health facilities and medical staff. It has a central hospital that has limited capabilities and doesn't have highly experienced staff. In Qarabagh District hospital, basic health services, first aid and emergency services are available to patients while serious patients are either referred to Ghazni or Kabul.

The District has a few private clinics and two 24 hours private hospitals but they also lack facilities like surgeons and specialists.

== Education ==
Qarabagh District has a few Public Schools including Sultan Mahmood Public School,, and one newly built school with the help of Japan at a total cost of 19 million Afghanis and has 12 classrooms, providing educational opportunities for approximately 2,000 students in the district.

These schools were built by the United Nations International Children’s Emergency Fund (UNICEF) with financial support from Japan.

== Demographics ==
The majority of Pashtun Population is from the Kharoti tribe. And decades ago majority of land was and is still owned by the Nashir Family. Other tribes also live here like the Nasiris, Dotanis, Andars etc. The two main Hazara groups in the district are Muhammad Khwaja, who tend to live in the center and north of the district, and Chahar-Dasta, who tend to live in the west.

== Economy ==
The area is poor and traditionally one of out-migration to Kabul, Ghazni, Lashkar Gah, and Quetta, as well as to other countries.

Most of the population are depend on agricultural resources.

The economy is largely based on the remittances of the men who work out of the region. Agriculture is mostly based on irrigation, but production is low. Autumn wheat dominates, but spring wheat, barley, potatoes, beans, onions, carrots, turnips and fodder plants are also cultivated. Other crops like almonds, mulberries, apricots, apples and grape may be found in some areas.

== See also ==
- Districts of Afghanistan
- Hazarajat
- Qara Baghi (Hazara tribe)
