= Ghazni Province =

Province of Afghanistan

Ghazni غزنی
- Province
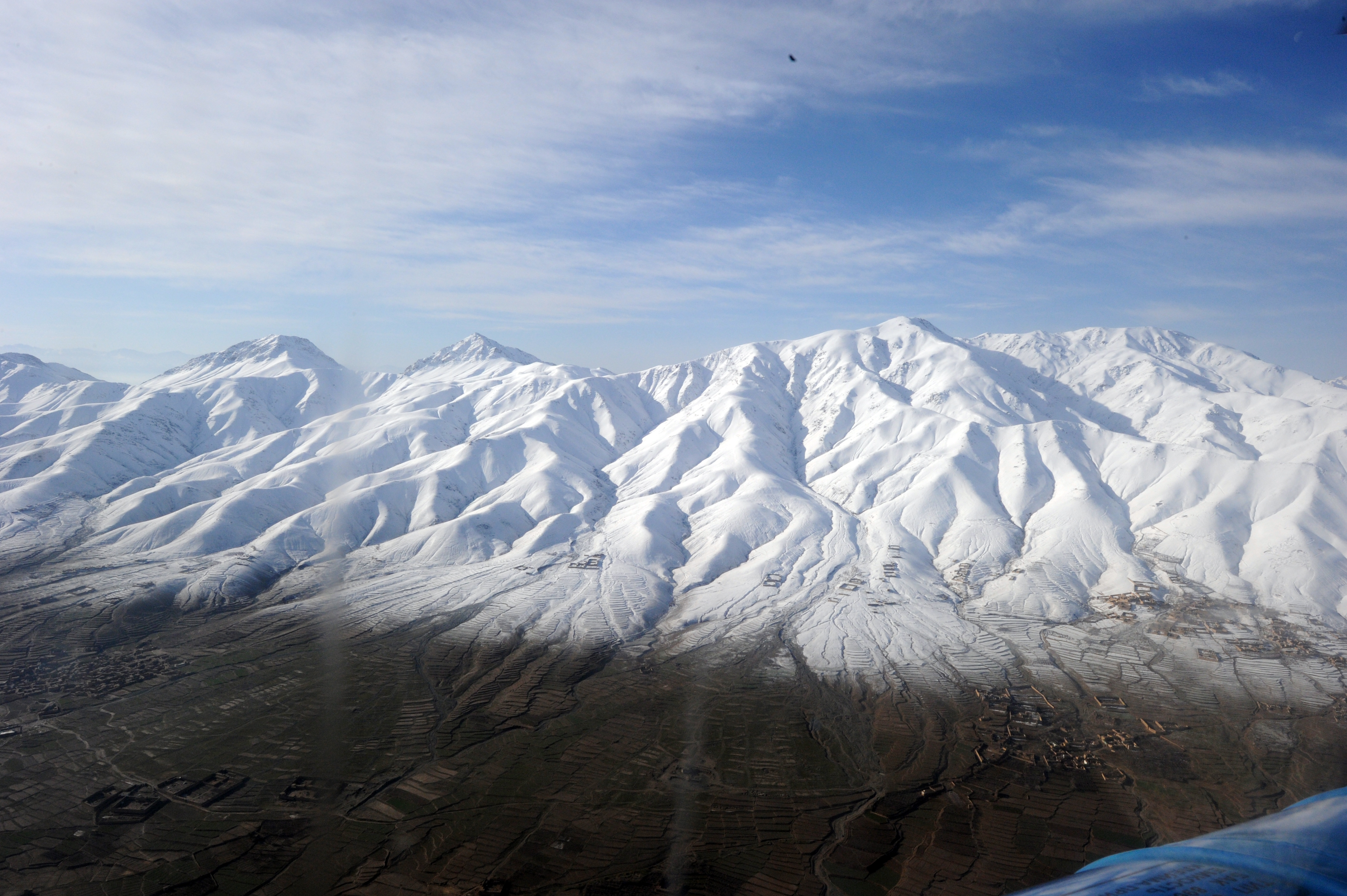
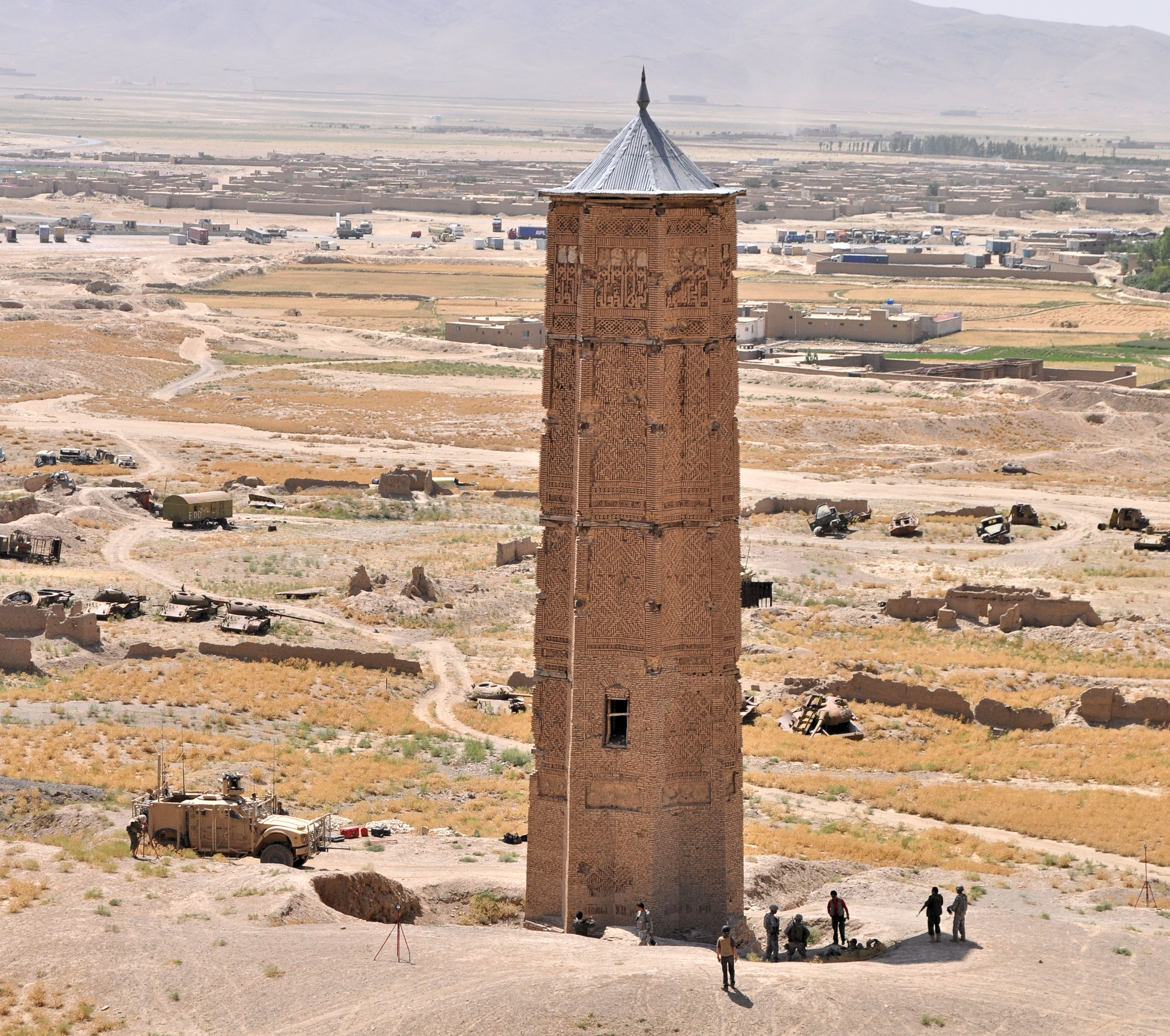
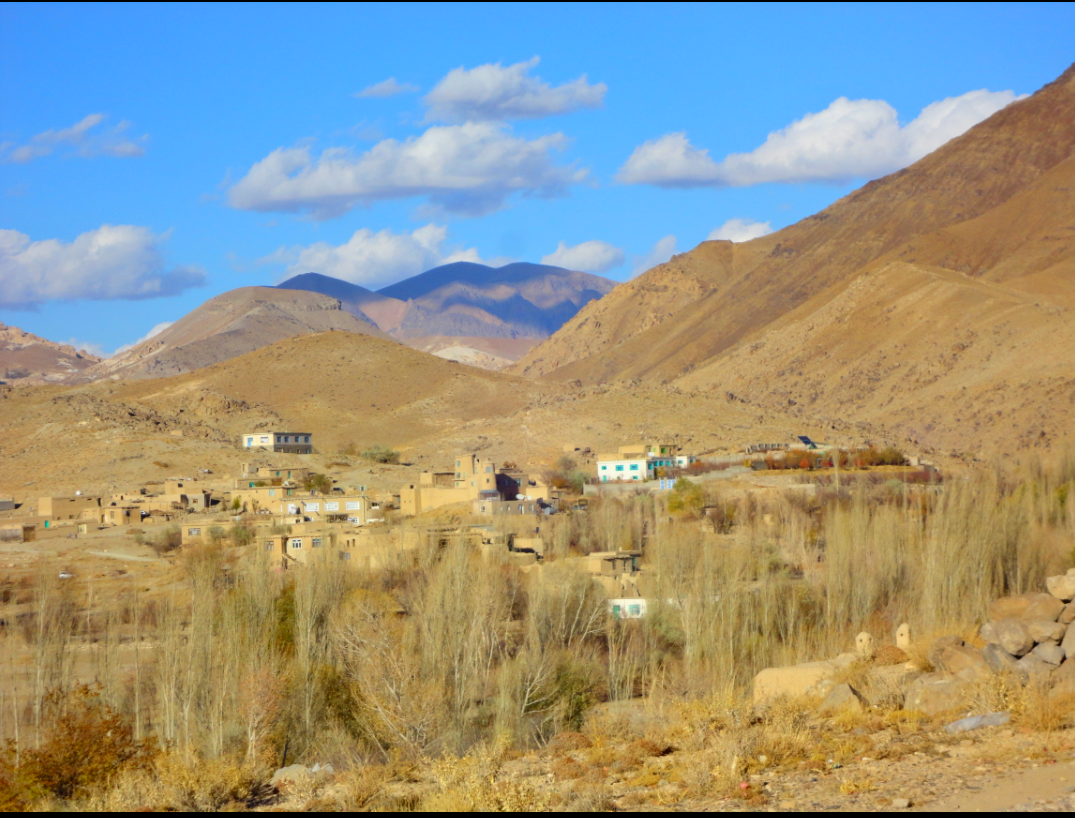
- From the top, The Mountains of Ghazni, Minaret of Bahram Shah , Jaghori District

- Map of Afghanistan with Ghazni province highlighted
- Coordinates (Capital): 33.5°N 68°E
- Country: Afghanistan
- Capital: Ghazni

Government
  - Governor: Mawlawi Wali Jan Hamja
  - Deputy Governor: Mawlawi Sardar Mohammad Madani

Area
  - Total: 22,460 km^{2} (8,670 sq mi)

Population (2021)
  - Total: 1,386,764
  - Density: 61.74/km^{2} (159.9/sq mi)
- Time zone: UTC+4:30 (Afghanistan Time)
- Postal code: 23xx
- ISO 3166 code: AF-GHA
- Main languages: Dari, Pashto

Ghazni (Pashto: غزني, Pashto pronunciation: [ɣaz.ni]; Dari: غزنی, Dari pronunciation: [ɣäz.níː]) is one of the 34 provinces of Afghanistan, located in southeastern Afghanistan. The province contains 19 districts, encompassing over a thousand villages and roughly 1.3 million people, making it the 5th most populous province. The city of Ghazni serves as the capital. It lies on the important Kabul–Kandahar Highway, and has historically functioned as an important trade center. The Ghazni Airport is located next to the city of Ghazni and provides limited domestic flights to Afghanistan's capital, Kabul.

Ghazni borders the provinces of Maidan Wardak, Logar, Paktia, Paktika, Zabul, Uruzgan, Daykundi and Bamyan.

== Etymology ==
The province was known as Ghazna in the 10th century, during and after the Ghaznavid era.

== History ==
Ghazni was a thriving Buddhist center before and during the 7th century AD. Excavations have revealed religious artifacts of both Hindu and Buddhist traditions.

"The two other great Buddhist centers, Fondukistan and Tepe-e-sardar (Ghazni) in its later phase are a very different matter and display another phase of influences coming from India from the seventh to eighth century. The representations show themes from Mahayana iconography and even in the case of the latter site assume Tantric aspects which had already established themselves in the large Indian monasteries like Nalanda."

"Another important site is that of Tepe Sardar (better known as Tepe-yi Nagara, Tepe of the kettledrum) near Ghazni, which was occupied until perhaps the eighth century AD. From this period dates a huge statue of the Parinirvana Buddha (Buddha lying down at the end of his cycle of rebirths) of unbaked clay. A very similar statue has been found just north of Afghanistan, at the site of Adzhina tepe in Tajikistan. Yet what is most interesting was the find at the same site of a statue of the Hindu deity Durga Mahishasura-mardini."

In 644 AD, the Chinese pilgrim Xuanzang visited the city of Jaguda (probably Ghazni), while returning from Varnu (modern Bannu, Pakistan)

=== Islamization ===
In 683 AD, armies from the Umayyad Caliphate brought Islam to the area and attempted to conquer the capital of Ghazni but the local tribes fiercely resisted. Its resistance was so famed that Yaqub Saffari (840-879) from Zaranj made an example of Ghazni when he ranged the vast region conquering in the name of Islam. The city was completely destroyed by the Saffarids in 869. A substantial portion of the local population including Hindus and Buddhists were converted to Islam by Mahmud of Ghazni

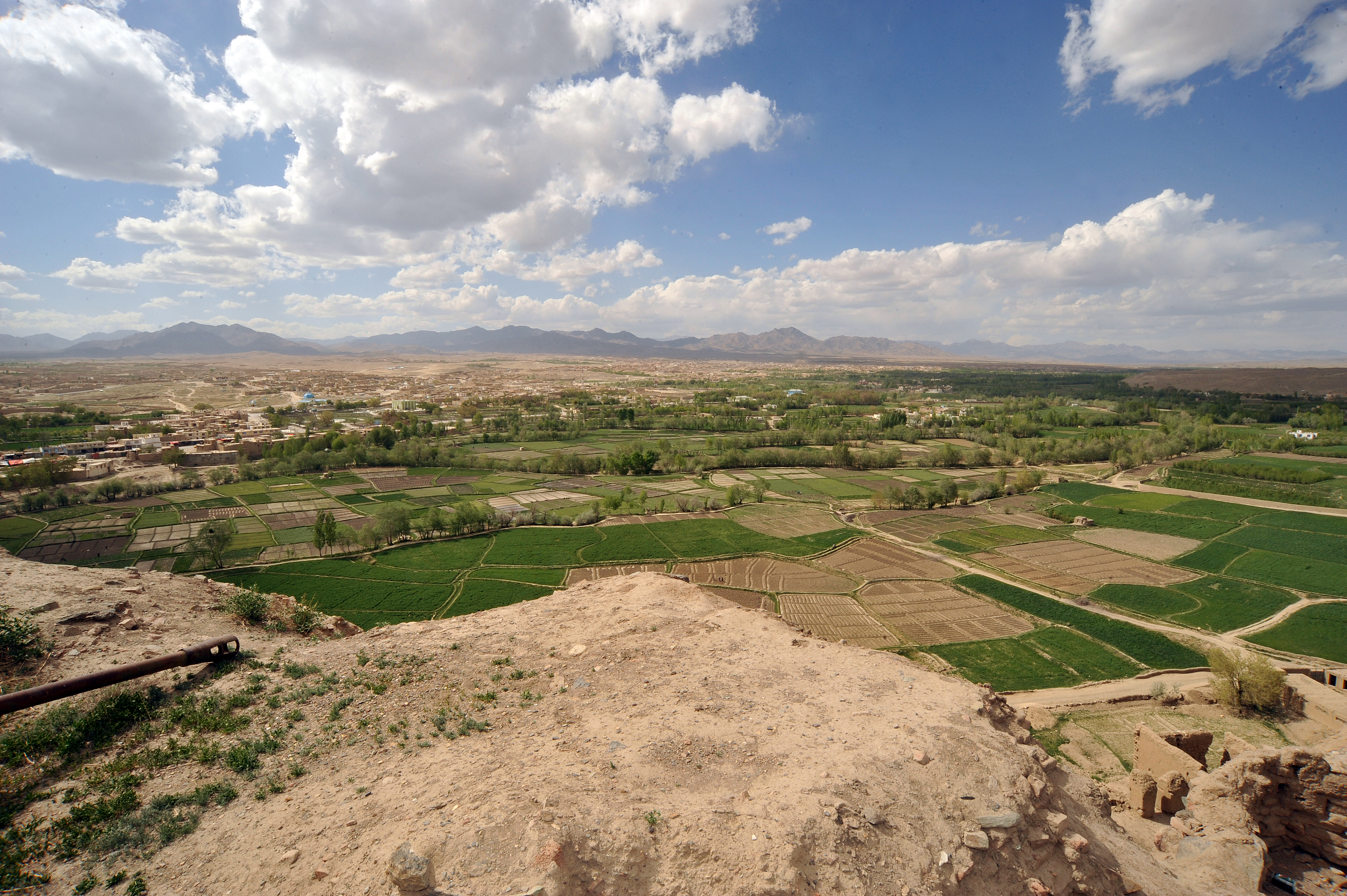
View of the Old Ghazni City

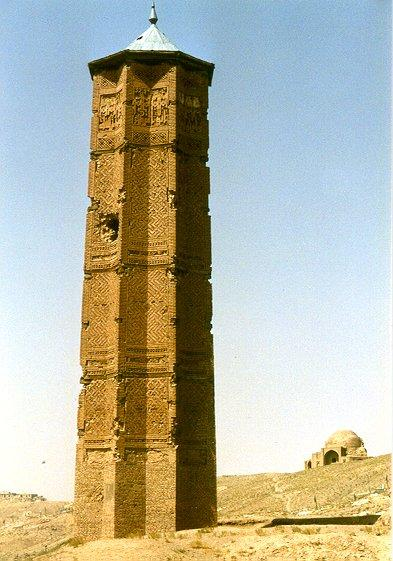
The minaret of Ghazni, built by Bahram Shah during the Ghaznavid Empire

"There is no evidence that Ghazna had previously formed part of the Samanid kingdom. It had been previously overrun with the whole of Zabulistan and Kabul by the Saffaris by 260 (873) but it is doubtful how far their power was permanent and even when the Samanids became paramount there is no evidence that Kabul or Ghazna were under them. The ruler of Ghazna is described as Padshah and was allied to the Hindushahis of Kabul. These titles were not as yet used by the Muhammadan rulers. The Padshah Lavik was probably a Hindu chief even though some passages in the Tabakth i Nisiri give him the name of Abu Bakr or Abu Ali."

After the rebuilding of the city by Yaqub's brother, it became the dazzling capital of the Ghaznavids from 994 to 1160, encompassing much of North India, Persia and Central Asia. Many iconoclastic campaigns were launched from Ghazni into India. The Ghaznavids took Islam to India and returned with fabulous riches taken from both prince and temple god. Contemporary visitors and residents at Ghazni write with wonder of the ornateness of the buildings, the great libraries, the sumptuousness of the court ceremonies and of the wealth of precious objects owned by Ghazni's citizens.

Ferishta records attacks by Muhammad of Ghor: "at the same time most of the infidels who inhabited the mountains between Ghazni and the Indus were also converted, some by force and others by persuasion." Ghazni's eponymous capital was razed in 1151 by the Ghorid Alauddin. It again flourished but only to be permanently devastated, this time in 1221 by Genghis Khan and his Mongol armies after 6 years of Khwarezmid rule. Ghazni's strategic position, both economically and militarily, assured its revival initially under the Qarlughids, albeit without its dazzling former grandeur.

Ghazni is famous for its minarets built on a stellar plan. They date from the middle of the twelfth century and are the surviving element of the mosque of Bahramshah. Their sides are decorated with geometric patterns. Upper sections of the minarets have been damaged or destroyed. The most important mausoleum located in Ghazni is that of Sultan Mahmud's. Others include the tombs of poets and scientists, for example Al-Biruni and Sanai. The only ruins in Old Ghazni retaining a semblance of architectural form are two towers, about 43 m (140 ft) high and some 365 m (1,200 ft) apart. According to inscriptions, the towers were constructed by Mahmud of Ghazni and his son.

Ibn Battuta noted "The greater part of the town is in ruins, with nothing but a fraction of it still standing, although it was formerly a great city."

Babur records in his memoirs that Ghazni was part of Zabulistan. The area was controlled by the Mughals until Nader Shah and his Persian forces invaded it in 1738. Ahmad Shah Durrani conquered Ghazni in 1747 and made it part of the Durrani Empire. During the First Anglo-Afghan War, the capital of Ghazni province was destroyed by the British-led Indian forces in the Battle of Ghazni.

In the 1960s a 15-meter female Buddha was discovered lying on its back and surrounded by empty pillars that once held rows of smaller male Buddhas. Parts of the female Buddha have been stolen. In the 1980s a mud brick shelter was created to protect the sculpture, but the wood supports were stolen for firewood and the shelter partially collapsed.

=== Recent history ===
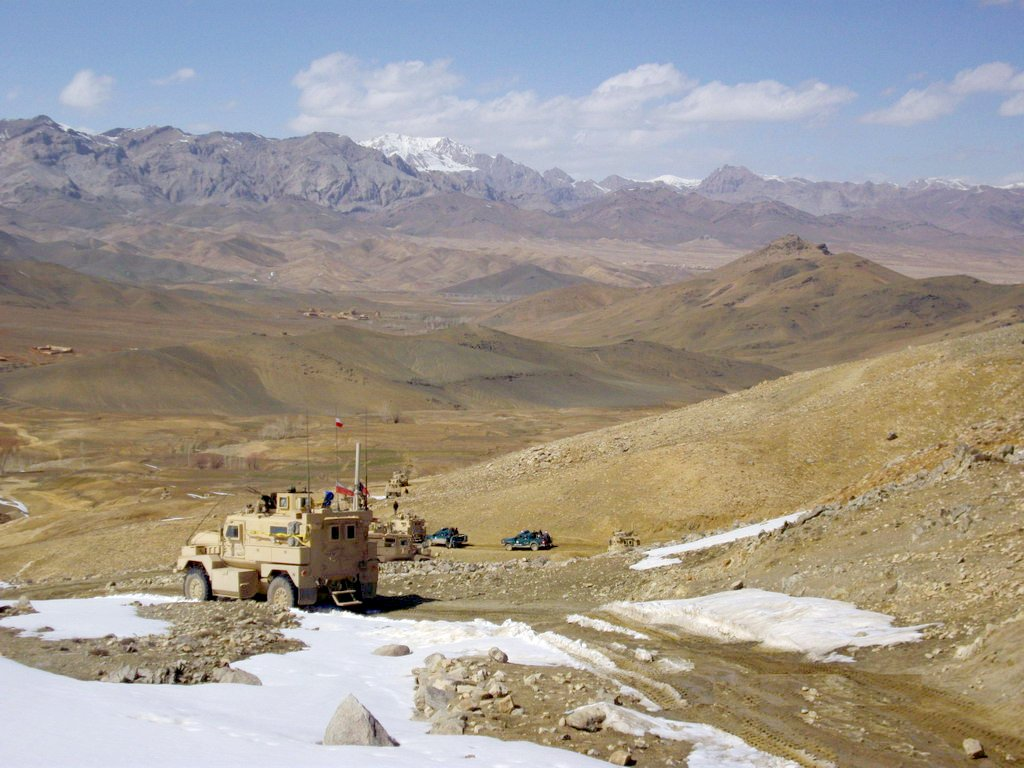
Polish forces in Rashidan district during "Operation Passage" in April 2009.

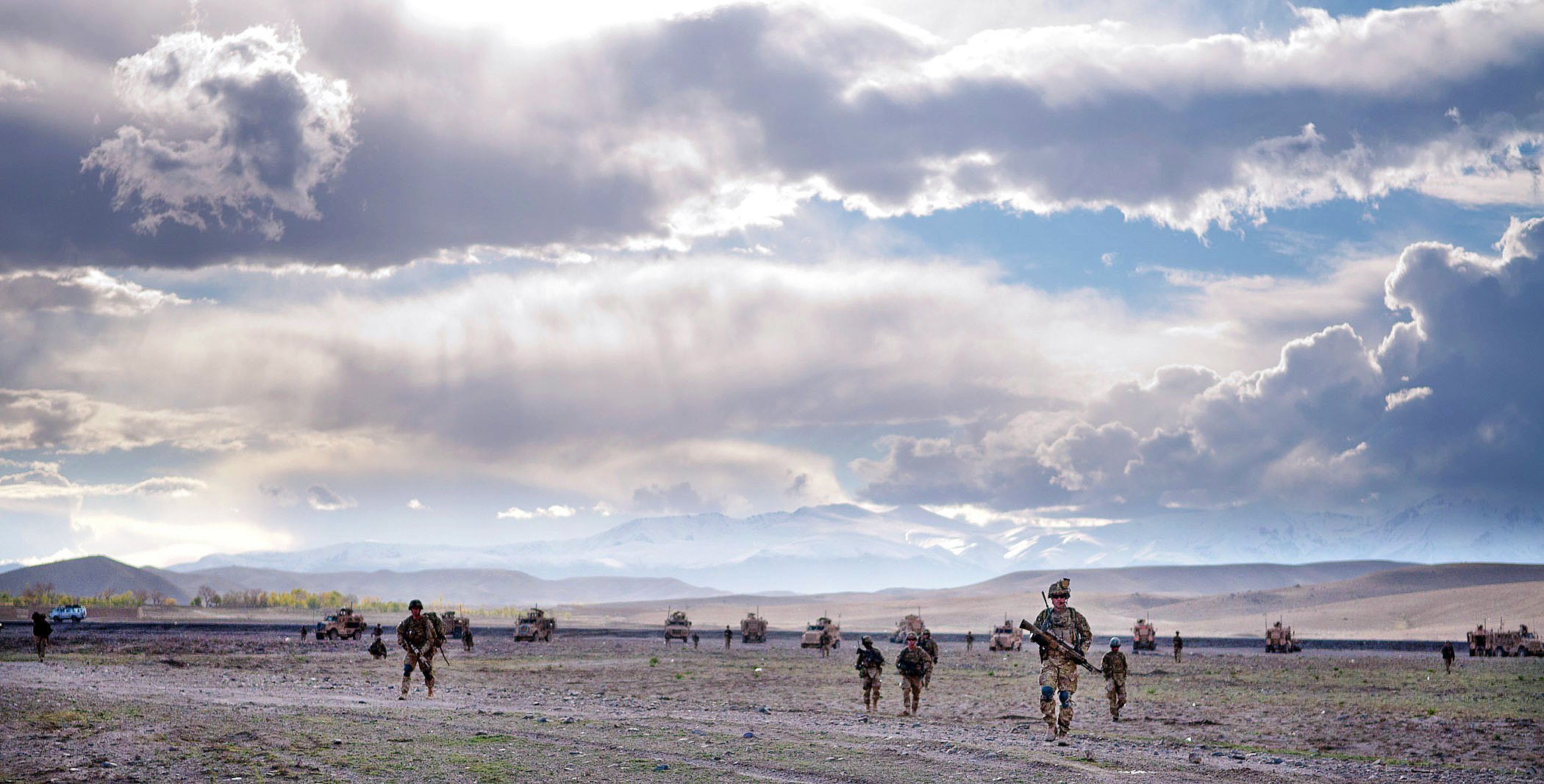
U.S. paratroopers and Afghan soldiers move into a village during a combined patrol in 2012.

Since the US-led invasion of Afghanistan in October 2001, there has been a Provincial reconstruction base and a NATO forces base. These western forces (mostly Polish Armed Forces) were hunting Taliban and al-Qaida militants, who were active in the area.

Like many southern Afghan provinces, Ghazni has a precarious security situation. The Taliban insurgents are found in the rural areas outside of the capital, and are involved in attacks on provincial schools and government infrastructure. The province has avoided the outright warfare seen in other provinces of Afghanistan such as Helmand and Kandahar, but that is due more to political expediency and the tactical plans of the NATO-led ISAF force than the existence of a stable security situation in the province. Ex-Governor Taj Mohammad was killed by insurgents in 2006 after being appointed police chief of the province with a mandate to quell the power of the Taliban. On the same day there was an unsuccessful attempt on the life of the governor at the time, Sher Alam Ibrahimi. There is a Polish and American Provincial Reconstruction Team base located in Ghazni.

- In late April 2007, news agencies reported that Taliban fighters had taken control of Giro District in the province. The Taliban reportedly killed the district administrator, chief of police (who had been on the job for only one month) and three police officers. The Taliban withdrew from the district center one day later.
- In July 2007, 23 South Korean volunteers were kidnapped in the province by the Taliban.
- On September 28, 2010, the Deputy Governor of Ghazni and five others were killed after a suicide bomber on a motorized rickshaw attacked their vehicle. Deputy Governor Mohammad Kazim Allahyar and several men travelling with him were killed instantly when the attacker detonated his explosives at the back of their car near the airport in Ghazni City. The bodies were so badly burnt that there was some confusion about the identity of the other victims. Provincial police chief Delawar Zahid reported Allahyar's son, nephew and driver died, along with two civilians passing by on a bicycle.
- As of 26 September 2014, there is ongoing fighting in key districts between the Taliban and Afghan National Security Forces (ANSF).
- After steady gains by the Taliban across the province in 2017 and early 2018 the Battle of Ghazni took place in August 2018.

== Geography ==
Recent geologic surveys have indicated Ghazni may have one of the world's richest deposits of lithium. Gold and copper were also found in the Zarkashan Mine of Ghazni province with an estimated value of US$30 billion. Whilst lithium deposits valued at around US$60 billion, were discovered in four eastern and western provinces of Afghanistan, together with other newly (2010) discovered mineral deposits, the total value estimate of US$3 trillion is based on a survey of 30 percent of the country's land mass.

== Administrative divisions ==
Ghazni District Map

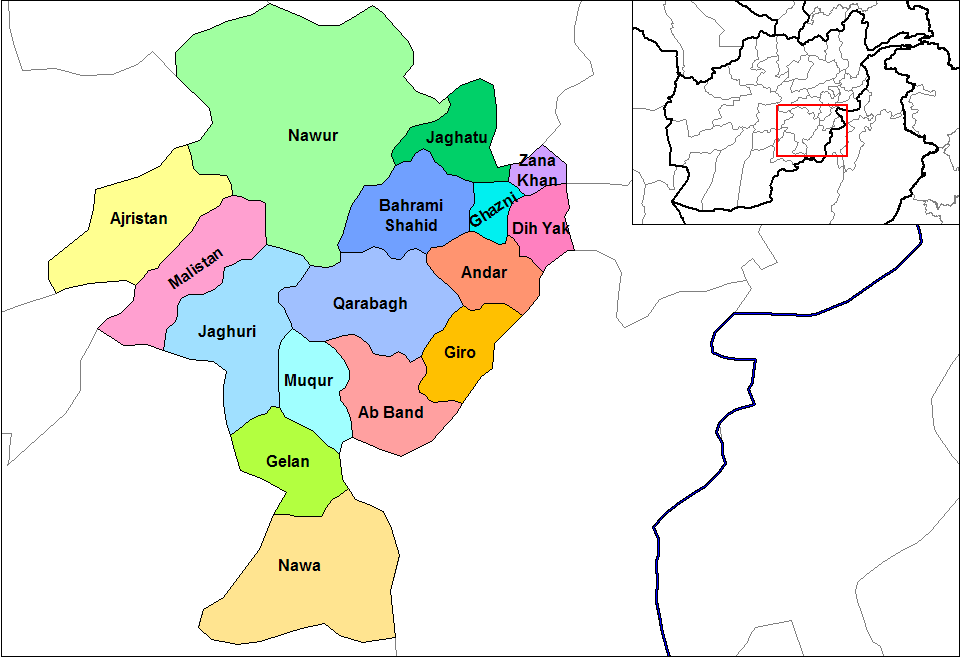
Map of the districts of Ghazni as of January 2004, prior to the redrawing of provincial and district boundaries later that year

Districts of Ghazni Province
District	Capital	Population (2020)	Area in km^{2}	Pop. density	Ethnic composition
Ab Band	Haji Khel	31,089	991	31	>99% Pashtun, <1% Tajik.
Ajristan	Sangar	32,550	1,461	22	97% Pashtun, 3% Hazara.
Andar	Miray	140,963	681	207	100% Pashtun.
Deh Yak	Ramak	55,269	709	78	89% Hazara, 11% Pashtun.
Gelan	Janda	65,366	1,116	59	100% Pashtun.
Ghazni	Ghazni	186,706	380	491	50% Tajik, 25% Pashtun, 20% Hazara, 5% Hindus.
Giro	Pana	41,319	878	47	100% Pashtun.
Jaghori	Sang-e-Masha	199,553	1,965	102	100% Hazara.
Jaghatū	Gulbawri	35,871	696	52	73% Hazara, 27% Pashtun.
Khogyani	Khogyani	22,719	147	155	>99% Pashtun, <1% Hazara and Tajik.
Khwaja Umari	Kwaja Umari	21,390	176	122	45% Hazara, 35% Tajik, 20% Pashtun.
Malistan	Mir Adina	92,736	1,978	47	100% Hazara.
Muqur	Muqur	56,863	931	61	99% Pashtun, 1% Tajik and Hazara.
Nawa	Nawa	33,613	1,753	19	100% Pashtun.
Nawur	Du Abi	106,952	5,097	21	100% Hazara.
Qarabagh	Qarabagh	161,424	1,690	96	55% Pashtun, 45% Hazara.
Rashidan	Rashidan	20,328	98	208	96% Pashtun, 4% Hazara.
Waghaz	Waghaz	43,578	512	85	Predominantly Pashtun.
Zana Khan	Dado	14,215	284	50	100% Pashtun.
Ghazni		1,362,504	22,461	61	48.1% Pashtuns, 43.8% Hazaras, 7.4% Tajiks, 0.7% Hindus. (Note: Note: "Predominantely" or "dominated" is interpreted as 99%, "majority" as 70%, "mixed" as 1/(number of ethnicities), "minority" as 30% and "few" or "some" as 1%.)

== Economy ==
=== Infrastructure ===
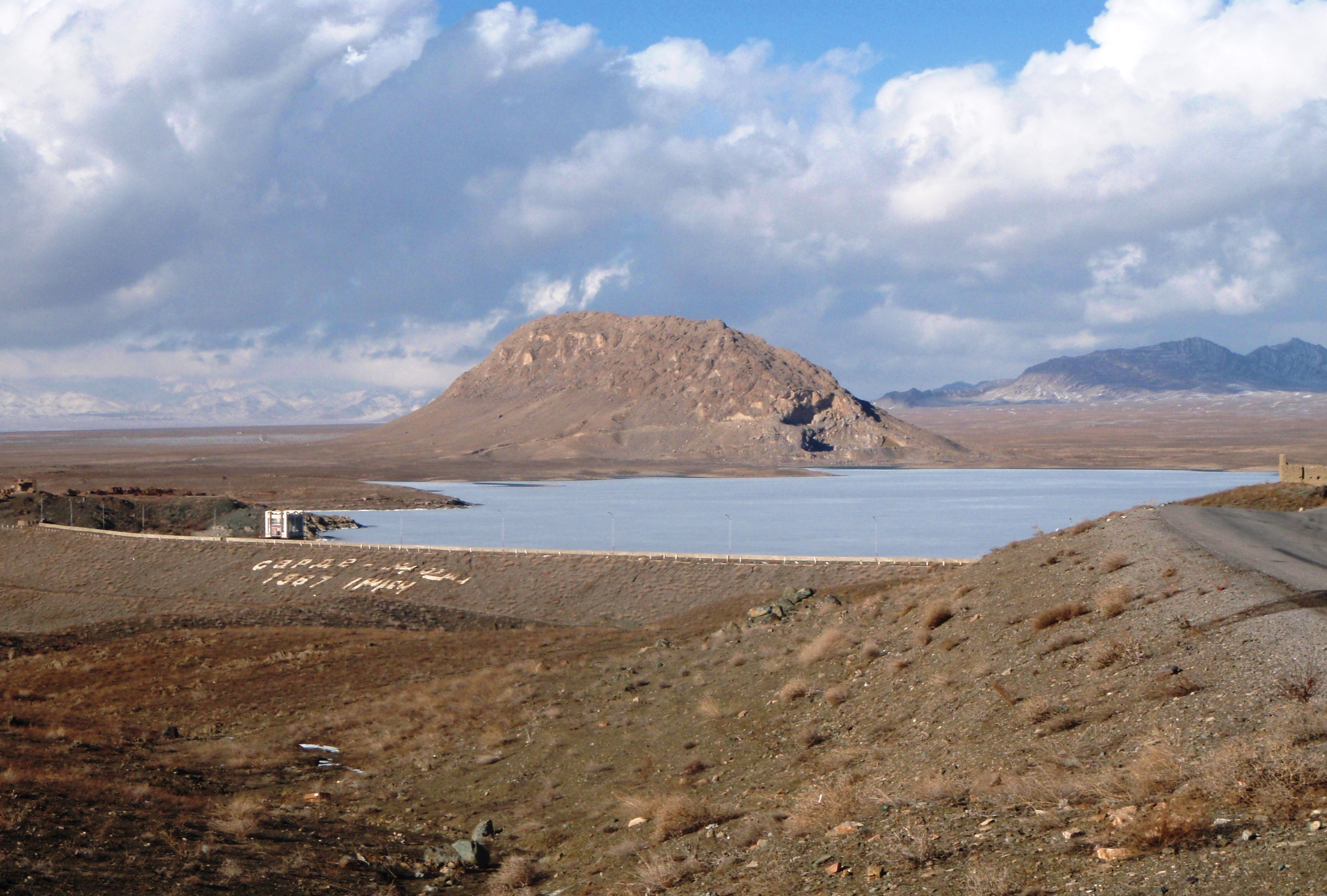
The Sardeh Band Dam in 2012

The Sardeh Band Dam is located in Andar District near the border with Paktika Province. It creates a large water reservoir that is critical to the irrigation of the Kahnjoor farming zone. The dam itself and the canal system it feeds both need repairs and maintenance.

Governor Musa Khan Akbarzada stated that key development projects would be launched in southern Ghazni in 2012 ahead of the Asian capital of the Islamic civilization for 2013. The projects include the construction of a proposed Islamic cultural center, a mosque, a covered bazaar, a gymnasium, a guesthouse, an airport, a five-star hotel and two 27 story-buildings and others. More than 2,000 people would find work opportunities on the $30 million projects; $10 million would be provided by the central government, $7 million by the Polish provincial reconstruction team (PRT) and $3 million by the US. A 40-kilometer road would be asphalted by the end of 2012.

Ghazni province is to be connected to the national electrical distribution system via North-east Power System (NEPS). The construction of the transmission line would begin from east Chimtala to Ghazni using a high voltage transmission network (2 x 220kV transmission lines and power substations). The project is to be implemented by USFOR-A and USAID costing $101 million. However, the Asian Development Bank agreed to complete the transmission line from Chimtala to Dast-i-Barchi; hence reducing the Project scope to begin from Dast-i-Barchi instead of Chimtala. The implementation of this project was delayed due to USACE being unable to award a contract because bids received for the project were more than double the estimated costs, due largely to security concerns resulting from the risks associated with implementing firm-fixed-price contracts in a kinetic environment, poor cost estimates, and unrealistic periods of performance. USACE is re-procuring both projects and plans to award contracts in June or July 2012, which will delay the project's execution schedules between 6 and 15 months. Furthermore, the delays in transferring funds contributed to delays in project execution. This line is a key part of a planned NEPS to SEPS connection to transport power to Kandahar to replace the expensive diesel-fueled power plants.

=== Transportation ===
The Kabul–Kandahar Highway runs through the province.

The Ghazni Airport began operations in April 2012 but does not have any commercial flights as of August 2018. Residents in neighboring provinces, such as Logar, Paktika, Maidan Shahr and Zabul, would also benefit from the airport.

== Demographics ==
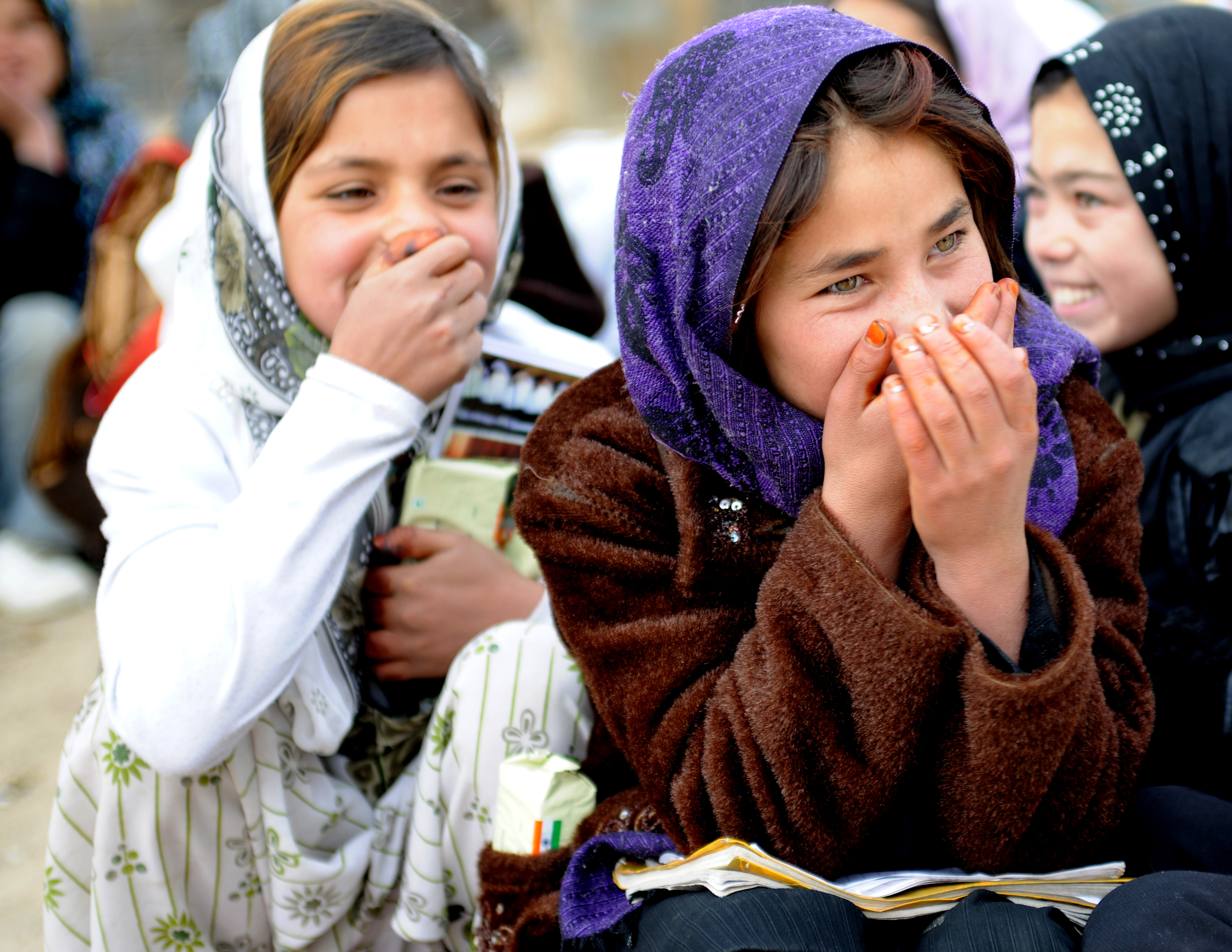
Schoolgirls in Ghazni province

=== Population ===
As of 2020, the total population of the province is about 1,386,764.

=== Ethnicity, languages and religion ===
Ghazni is multi-ethnic and mostly a tribal society. Ethnically, Ghazni is composed mainly of Hazaras and Pashtuns, which both make up about 45% of the population each. Hazaras live mainly in the north and west, while the Pashtuns live mainly in the south and east. Tajiks make up only about 5% of the whole province's population, but are the main ethnic group of the capital city Ghazni at about 50% there. Also, there is a small community of Hindus. Agriculture and animal husbandry are the primary occupation of the citizens of Ghazni. Wheat, alfalfa, melons, and almonds are among the largest crops produced.

Estimated ethnolinguistic and -religious composition
Ethnicity	Pashtun	Hazara	Tajik/ Farsiwan	Other	Sources
Period	Pashtun	Hazara	Tajik/ Farsiwan	Other	Sources

2004–2021 (Islamic Republic)	≤50%	≤46%	≤5%	∅
2020 EU	1st	2nd	3rd	–
2017 CSSF (Note: Demographic information is based on data from 2017.)	majority	minority	∅	∅ (Note: incl. Uzbek and Sikh.)
2015 NPS	48.9%	45.9%	4.7%	∅ (Note: incl. 0.4% Hindu/Sikh.)
2011 PRT	50% (Note: excl. Kochi and incl. Andar, Sulaimankhel, Tarakai, Kharoti, Niazi, Sulemanzai, Alikhel, Dawtani, Durrani, Miakhil, Jalalzai, Khogyani, Musakhel, Hotak, and Wardak.)	47%		∅ (Note: incl. 0.1% Uzbek and Bayat.)
2011 USA	48.9% (Note: excl. Kuchi in summer periods.)	45.9%	4.7%	–
2009 ISW	90%		10% (Note: incl. Hindu.)	

Legend:
- ∅: Ethnicity mentioned in source but not quantified
- –: Ethnicity not mentioned specifically
- Source abbreviations: Empirical sources: –, Government sources: EU – European Union Agency for Asylum, PRT – Provincial Reconstruction Team of the United States government, Editorial sources: CSSF – Center for the Scientific Study of Families, ISW – Institute for the Study of War, NPS – Naval Postgraduate School, USA – United States Army.

=== Health ===
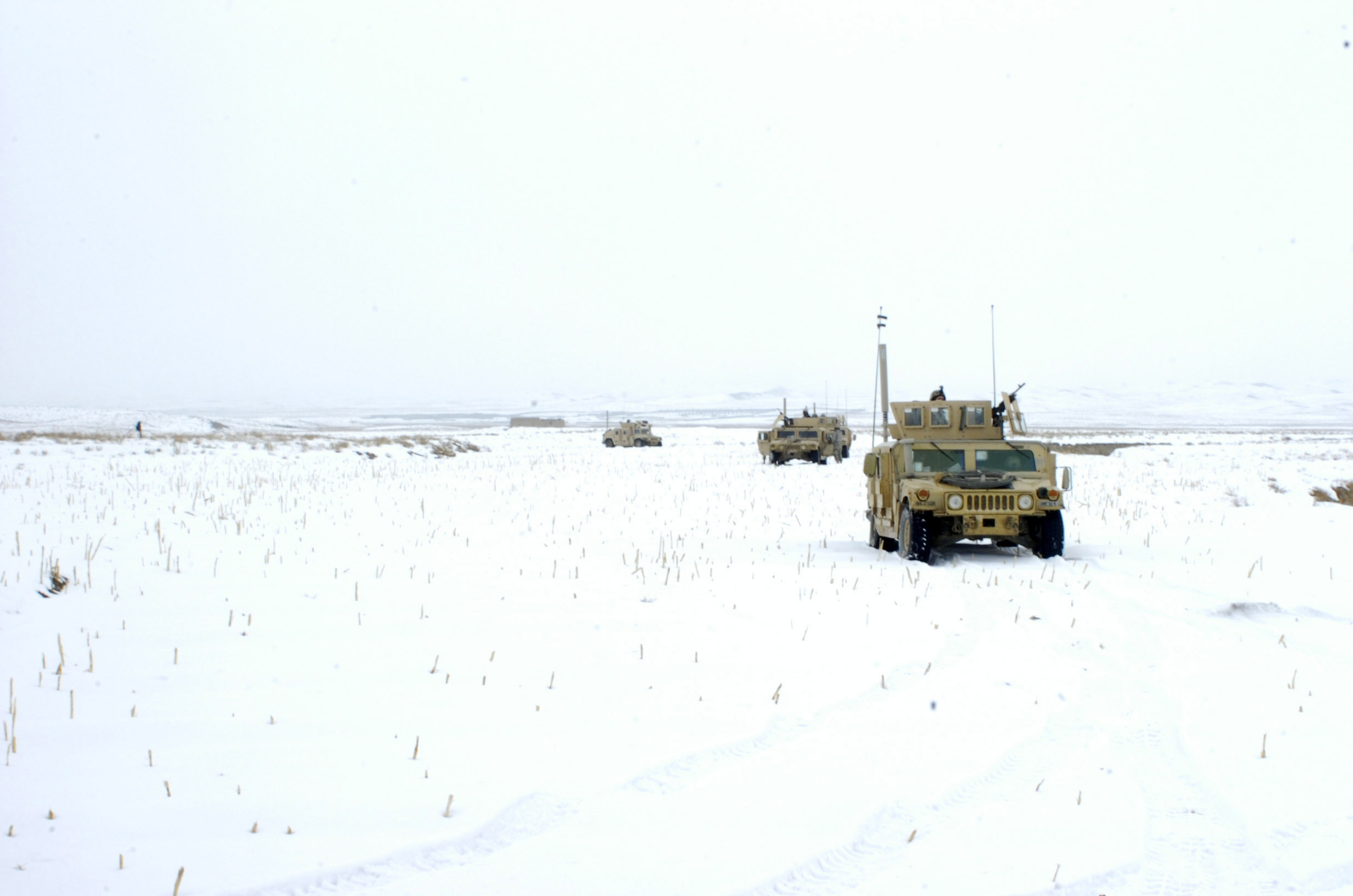
Ghazni PRT brings medical care and winter clothes to Nawa District.

The percentage of households with clean drinking water fell from 35% in 2005 to 18% in 2011. The percentage of births attended to by a skilled birth attendant increased from 7% in 2005 to 11% in 2011.

=== Education ===
The overall literacy rate (6+ years of age) fell from 35% in 2005 to 31% in 2011. The overall net enrolment rate (6–13 years of age) increased from 39% in 2005 to 54% in 2011.

== Notable people ==
- Abu Bakr Lawik
- Abu Ali Lawik
- Ali Hujwiri
- Hassan Ghaznavi
- Mahmud of Ghazni
- Azad Khan Afghan
- Gholam Mohammad Niazi
- Nur Muhammad Taraki
- Abdul Ahad Mohmand
- Faiz Muhammad Kateb
- Aziz Royesh
- Farrukhi Sistani
- Manuchehri Damghani
- Abolfazl Beyhaqi
- Hakim Sanai
- Muhammad Shah
- Bhai Nand Lal
- Sohaila Sharifi

== See also ==
- Ghazni
- Maidan Wardak Province
- Provinces of Afghanistan
