= List of drone strikes in Afghanistan =

Drone strikes in Afghanistan
- Part of the War in Afghanistan (2001–2021) and the continuous Afghanistan conflict
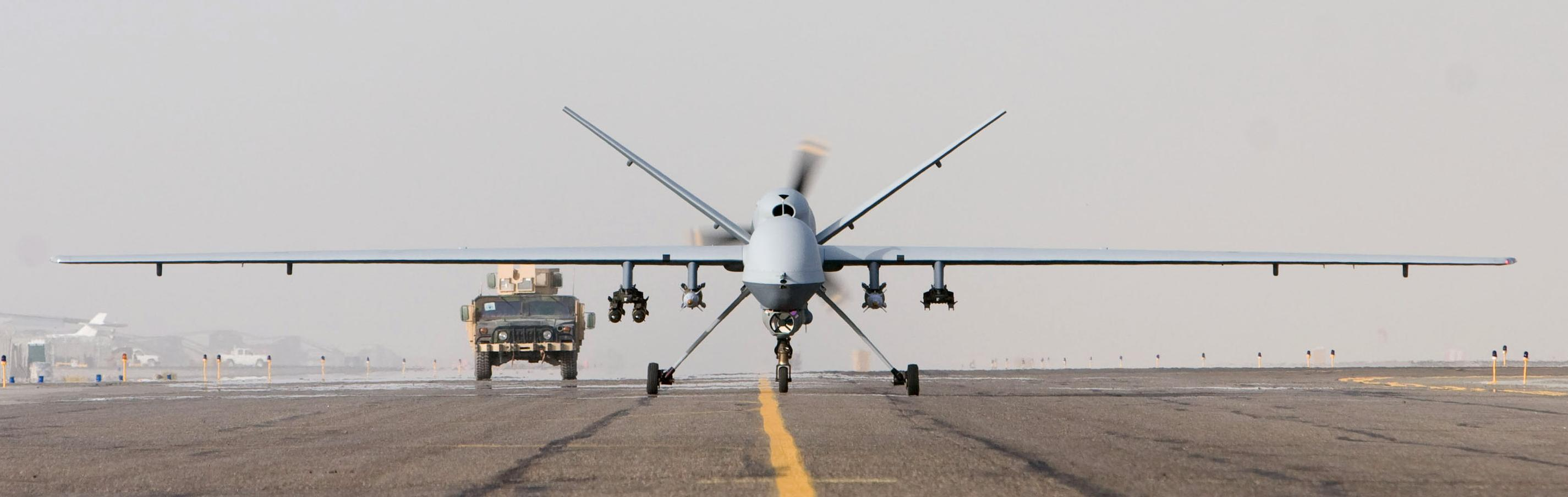
Date	7 October 2001 – 31 July 2022
Location	Afghanistan: 13,072 drone strikes confirmed
Status	CIA and United States Central Command drone operations

Casualties and losses
- Total killed: 4,138–10,088; Civilians killed: 310–919; Children killed: 73–191, Injured: 661–1,772

Since October 2001, multiple drone strikes have been conducted by the United States government in Afghanistan. These strikes began during the administration of the United States President George W. Bush. During the presidency of Donald Trump, it was estimated that drone strikes had multiplied at a pace of four to five times compared with previous presidency of Barack Obama. In 2016, Obama ordered the CIA to publish civilian drone strike deaths outside of active warzones, an order which was revoked by Trump in 2019.

By 2021, there had been a total of at least 13,074 airstrikes conducted by the US government, killing at least 4,138 people, including 310 civilians and 73 children. Besides the US government, the Afghan Air Force (AAF) also carried out air strikes in Afghanistan. Since 1 June 2016, the AAF has conducted at least 41 strike-capable operations.

== Timeline ==
=== 2001–2010 ===
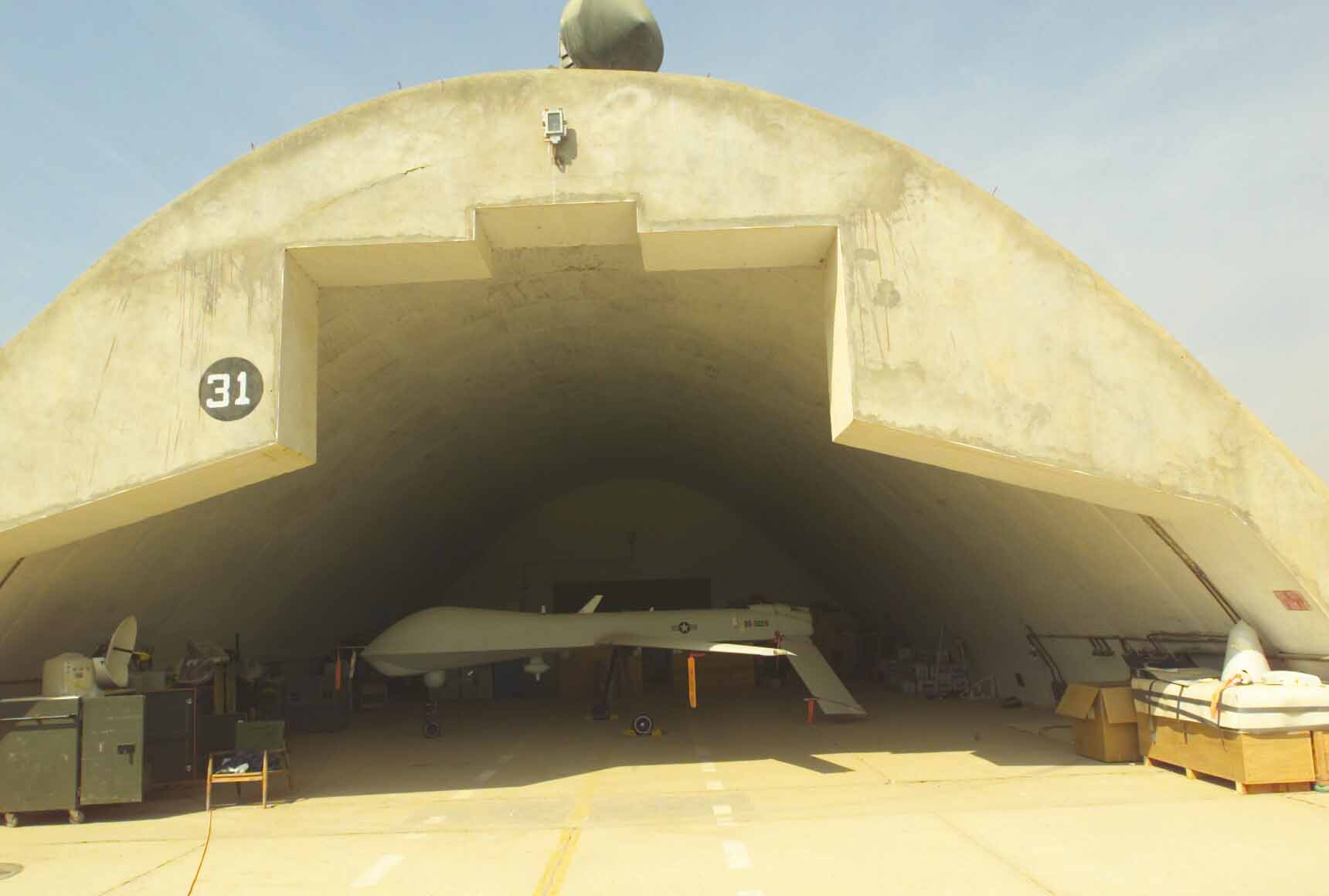
An RQ-1L Predator drone of the 57th Operations Group at a FOB in Afghanistan, 14 February 2002

- 21 February 2010: 23 civilians were killed in a drone strike near the area of the Uruzgan province.

=== 2011–2014 ===
- October 2014: Abu Bara al-Kuwaiti, a notable member of Al-Qaeda, was killed in a US drone strike in Nangarhar Province.

=== 2015 ===
- 1 January 2015: One unknown killed in a US drone strike Spera District Khost Province.
- 3 January 2015: Twenty-five were killed in two separate drone strikes, one at Gayan District Paktika Province killing eighteen and the other at Spera District Khost Province killing seven.
- 7 January 2015: Three reported killed in the eastern part of Logar Province.
- 8 January 2015: Six reported killed and three injured in a US air strike at Chikanawr area, Lal Pura District, Nangarhar Province.
- 11 January 2015: Eight killed and three injured at Chikanawr area, Lal Pura District, Nangarhar Province.
- 16 January 2015: Three killed at Nazyan District, Nangarhar Province.
- 17 January 2015: One unknown killed or injured at Lal Pura District, Nangarhar Province.
- 19 January 2015: One unknown killed or injured at Khogyani District, Nangarhar Province.
- 29 January 2015: Four killed at Nazyan District, Nangarhar Province.

=== 2016 ===
- 2 January 2016: Five former Pakistani Taliban (TTP) fighters who pledged alliance to ISIL, including the former TTP commander in Bajaur tribal agency in Pakistan, Abu Bakr, were killed by a US drone strike, further injuring two militants in the Shaltan Darra area, located in the Shaigal District, located in the Kunar Province.
- 5 January 2016: A US Special Forces soldier, Army Staff Sgt. Matthew McClintock, was killed during an hours-long gun battle by Taliban militants, also injuring two other soldiers, in the Majrah District, located in the Helmand Province, marking him the first US casualty of 2016.
- 6 January 2016: 12 US air or drone strikes killed an unknown number of people in the Majrah District, located in the Helmand Province.
- 8 January 2016: AAF strikes hit and killed 23 ISIL militants in the Achin and Kot districts, located in the Nangarhar Province.
- 8 January 2016: A US air or drone strike killed 17–20 ISIL militants, including four senior commanders, who were executing seven men (six Taliban militants and one Afghan National Army soldier) at the time, with a large number of civilians forced to watch in the Maktab village, located in the Pekha area, located in Achin District, located in the Nangarhar Province. Two civilians were injured and there were possible civilian deaths.
- 8 January 2016: A US air or drone strike killed an unknown number of people "to eliminate threats to the force" in the Kharkhez District, located in the Kandahar Province.
- 8 January 2016: A US air or drone strike killed an unknown number of people "to eliminate threats to the force" in the Barmal District, located in the Paktika Province.
- 9 January 2016: 20 ISIL militants were killed by a US drone strike in Achin District, located in the Nangarhar Province.
- 9 January 2016: 15 ISIL militants were killed by a US air or drone strike in the Janjal Gondai area, located in the Kot District, located in the Nangarhar Province, further injuring three people, including a woman.
- 9 January 2016: Ten militants from Pakistan were killed by a US air or drone strike in the Shaigal District, located in the Kunar Province. The victims included Zishan, Haqyar and Sajid Mohammed (aka Attique or Atiqullah), aged 13 to 14, who was the son of Maulvi Faqir Mohammad a former deputy leader of the TTP, who served under the command of Baitullah and Hakimullah Mehsud.

=== 2018 ===
- 1 January 2018: At least 61 ISIL militants were killed, including one civilian, in the Nangarhar province by a possible US strike. A further 30 ISIL militants were injured, including 14 civilians.
- 1 January 2018: Twenty-six people, including foreigners and prominent ISIL commanders, were killed by a possible US strike in the village of Saradara and Alkhani in the Darzab District. Some victims included famous militant commander Qari Zia aka Shuja, and two other prominent militants, Yaqub and Shaikh, a judge. There were also possible civilian casualties.
- 1 January 2018: A possible US strike killed seven Taliban fighters in the Bati Kot district. A second strike killed two members of ISIL's Afghan branch in Achin District.
- 5 January 2018: A possible US strike killed 10 ISIL militants in a training camp in Nangarhar's Haska Mena district while they were in training. Two compounds belonging to ISIL were also destroyed, leaving five militants dead. Another strike killed six militants during ground operations.
- 5 January 2018: A possible US strike killed 14 ISIL militants, including two commanders, in the Nad-e Ali district in the Laghman Province.
- 6 January 2018: An unnamed key Taliban leader responsible for "financial deals and providing logistics" for militants was killed in the Helmand Province by a possible US strike.
- 10 January 2018: Twenty-one militants, including seven foreigners from Pakistan, were killed by a possible US strike in the Khak e Safid district, located in the Farah Province.
- 1 April 2018: Mullah Lal Mohammad, a local Taliban leader in the Kandarhar province, was killed by a AAF strike in the Nish district, injuring 11 other members of his group Also the same day, a US strike killed an unknown number of Taliban fighters in the Nad Ali district.
- 2 April 2018: Afghan military strike kills at least 70, including 21 terrorists, one of whom was a Taliban commander, and injured 30 others during a religious ceremony at a Mosque in Dasht-e-Archi.
- 3 April 2018: US drone strike killed four ISIL militants in Nangarhar.
- 5 April 2018: A high-ranking ISIL commander named Qari Hikmatullah (also Hekmat) and his bodyguard were killed in a US drone strike in the northern province of Jowzjan.
- 6 April 2018: An AAF strike killed eight militants in Farghamerawi locality of Wurduj District.

=== 2019 ===
- 18 September 2019: A US drone strike intended to hit an Islamic State hideout killed 30 pine-nut farmers in the Nangarhar Province.
- 1 December 2019: A US drone strike on a car carrying a woman who had just given birth near Khost left five people dead.

=== 2020 ===
- 8 January 2020: More than 60 civilians were killed or wounded in a US drone attack targeting Mullah Nangyalay, a top Taliban splinter-group commander in Herat Province.
- 9 January 2020: Two civilians were killed in a US air or drone strike in Kapisa Province during Operation Freedom's Sentinel.
- 4 March 2020: No deaths or injuries were reported after a US drone strike targeting members of the Taliban was carried out in the Nahr-e Saraj district of southern Helmand province. This attack was the first since the signing of the Doha Agreement, occurring just six days before the intra-Afghan peace negotiations were scheduled to begin, and was retaliation for a wave of attacks that killed four civilians and 11 Afghan soldiers the day before.

=== 2021 ===
- 27 August: The United States launched an airstrike against what US military said was a vehicle carrying three ISIL-KP members in Nangarhar Province. Two were killed, who were described by Pentagon spokesman John Kirby as "high-profile ISIS targets" and "planners and facilitators"; the third occupant of the vehicle was injured. The airstrike was carried out a day after an attack at Kabul Airport, which had resulted in the deaths of more than 180 people. One of those killed was identified by CENTCOM on 23 September as Kabir Aidi, an alleged ISIL-K facilitator. The other was identified as a collaborator with the group, though his identity could not be confirmed.
- 29 August: A US airstrike targeted a vehicle in Kabul a few kilometres from the airport, which US officials claimed was carrying ISIL-KP bombers but was actually driven by an aid worker, who worked for the US-based Nutrition and Education International. The aid worker had loaded containers of water into his trunk for his family and his neighbors, which a New York Times investigation suggested had been mistakenly identified by the US military as explosives, prompting the fatal airstrike. Water deliveries had stopped in his neighborhood following the collapse of the government. US officials initially claimed the vehicle had visited an alleged ISIS safe house and that secondary explosions had occurred after the airstrike, but no evidence of a secondary explosion was found at the site, and the location that the drone had tracked the driver to, where he and three others had loaded water into his trunk, was the office of Nutrition and Education International, and not an ISIS-K safe house as the US had alleged. A total of ten family members were killed in the airstrike at their home, including seven children and the driver. Some of those killed had previously worked for international NGOs and held visas allowing them entry to the United States. The United States military later acknowledged that the aid worker and the vehicle he was driving posed no threat, and there was no connection between him and ISIL-KP. The US government pledged to financially compensate the families of the deceased.

=== 2022 ===
- 31 July: Ayman al-Zawahri was killed in a drone strike conducted by the Central Intelligence Agency in Kabul. The Taliban said that the strike was conducted on a residential house in the Sherpur area of Kabul. The New York Times, citing an American analyst, reported that the house struck was owned by a top aide to Sirajuddin Haqqani, a senior official in the Taliban government.

== Controversies ==
The civilian casualties faced criticism and many killed being unintended targets. Amnesty International USA has also questioned the legality of drone attacks.

== See also ==
- Airstrikes in Libya since the beginning of the Libyan Crisis
- American military intervention in Somalia (2007–present)
- Drone strikes in Yemen
- List of drone strikes in Pakistan
