= Shinwari (disambiguation) =

Shinwari may refer to:

- Shinwari, a Pashtun tribe found in Nangarhar and Parwan Provinces, Afghanistan.
- Shinwari (surname)
- Shinwar District, a district in Nangarhar Province, Afghanistan
- Shinwari District, a district in Parwan Province, Afghanistan
