= Abdul Baqi (Taliban governor) =

Taliban official

- Born: 1962 (age 62–63); Jalalabad, Afghanistan
- Known for: Former Taliban governor

Maulvi Mullah Abdul Baqi (born 1962) is a senior Taliban official.

Mulla Baqi was an officer and comrade to Jalaluddin Haqqani. He also served as Khawst governor during the 1990s government where Burhanuddin Rabbani was president, though Burhanuddin had no control outside Kabul at the time. During 1995 Baqi threatened to attack the Hizb-e-Islami commander Fayiz Mohammad, who had tried to arrest local Arab fighters and seize their armaments to use for the battle at Kabul being waged by Gulbuddin Hekmatyar versus Ahmad Shah Massoud and Burhanuddin Rabbani. Baqi threatened Fayiz Mohammad by God that the Haqqani garrison would bombard the Matoun citadel stone by stone unless he let the Arabs go.

Subsequently, Baqi also served at this post during the Taliban emirate, which left the southeastern province's administration unchanged. In 1999 he was quoted as encouraging the family of a murder victim to show clemency to the murderer, who was about to be executed.

However, a former Taliban diplomat who switched sides, Wahid Muzdah, described Baqi in worse terms and accused him of narrow-mindedness. He replaced Abdul-Rahim Houtak, who had protested against the destruction of the Bamiyan Buddhas in 2001. (Gutman, "How we missed the story, 2007").

During the Taliban regime Abdul Baqi was a diplomat, Vice-Minister of Information and Culture, Governor of Khost Province and Paktika Province.

== Biography ==
According to a report prepared for the European Union:

During 2003, Abdul Baqi was involved in anti-government military activities in the Shinwar, Achin, Naziyan and Dur Baba Districts of the Nangarhar Province. As of 2009 he was engaged in organizing militant activities throughout the eastern region, particularly in the Nangarhar Province and Jalalabad City.

Early lists of sanctioned individuals, published by the United Nations, listed two separate individuals named Abdul Baqi. They listed Maulvi Abdul Baqi as a diplomat, and Mullah Abdul Baqi as Vice-Minister of Culture.

Leaked diplomatic cables described Abdul Baqi as a potential shadow governor.
