= Finances of the Islamic State – Khorasan Province =

Logo of the Islamic State's Khorasan Province

The Islamic State's Khorasan Province (ISIS-K) has historically relied on three primary sources of funding: payments from ISIS-Core, local taxation, and international donations. In a 2015 interview, an officer of Iran's Islamic Revolutionary Guards Corps (IRGC) commented that ISIS-K's real source of power in the region was in the organization's financial wealth. From its origins in 2013 to the present day, ISIS-K's monetary wealth has made it an attractive alternative for fighters unsatisfied with lower paying militant groups including TTP and the Afghan Taliban. Mirroring ISIS-Core and sister ISIS branches, ISIS-K's finances are managed by the province's Finance Commission.

At the core of ISIS-K's financial framework was the support received from ISIS-Central or the broader ISIS network. This internal coordination ensured a steady flow of funds to ISIS-K, strengthening its operational capacity. While the exact mechanisms of this financial relationship remain covert, the financial backing from the central leadership underscored the interconnected nature of various ISIS factions.

In the territories under its control, ISIS-K implemented a taxation system, imposing levies on local populations and businesses. This strategy allowed the group to extract resources directly from the communities it governed, showcasing a degree of financial autonomy within specific operational zones. The revenue generated through local taxation contributed to the group's self-sufficiency.

External and international funding constituted another crucial component of ISIS-K's financial ecosystem. The group attracted donations from sympathetic patrons, including wealthy individuals from Gulf countries like Qatar and Saudi Arabia. This external funding, coupled with collaborations with individuals willing to contribute resources, provided an additional layer of financial support. Moreover, engaging in criminal enterprises, such as human trafficking and smuggling, further diversified ISIS-K's funding sources, demonstrating adaptability in sustaining its operations.

== Payments from ISIS-Core ==
Since its inception, ISIS-K has received financial support from ISIS-Core in the Levant. Early in the group's history, ISIS-K benefitted from neither local taxation nor international donors. Up until 2015, the group's commanders received strict instruction not to impose taxes for fears of stepping on the toes of other militant groups in the region who also taxed the local populous for funds. Similarly, the newly established group had yet to establish trusted relationships with international donors that then remained with ISIS-Core in the Levant. Consequently, the new organization relied almost entirely on payments from ISIS-Core. According to the U.S. Department of the Treasury, “ISIS is best characterized as a global network of loosely organized branches and cells with varying financial activities coordinated under a central financial system that funds the core network and redistributes funds to less wealthy affiliates or global regions that it sees as a priority.”

In 2015, the year Wilayat Khorasan (ISIS-K) was officially announced, ISIS-Core in the Levant began encouraging ISIS-K to begin raising its own funds. According to a 2016 interview with three leaders from within ISIS-K's Finance Commission, ISIS-K received $100 million (USD) in 2015 and $78 million in 2016, a 22% loss, likely offset by a nearly 82% gain in private international donations. An additional factor in the decrease in funding may have been the sharp 55% decrease in ISIS-Core's income between the height of the caliphate in 2014 ($1.89 billion) and 2016 ($870 million) when the group had experienced significant territorial losses, including half of Mosul, to U.S.-led forces in Operation Inherent Resolve (OIR). Brief statements by the United States Department of State and Department of Treasury between 2019 and 2021 indicate that “ISIS core was possibly providing some funds to ISIS-K,” however the extent or sum of financial support during this time period has not been published.

=== Post 2021 ===
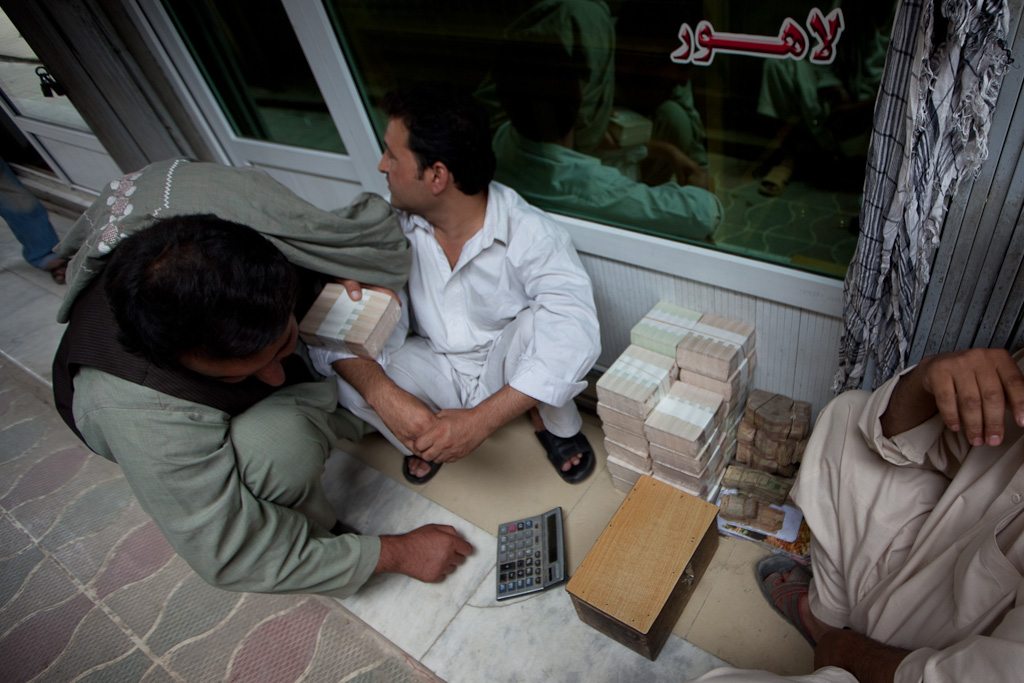
Hawala market in Kabul, Afghanistan

Details of ISIS-Core's funding support to ISIS-K following the August 2021 withdrawal of NATO forces remain publicly unclear, however the U.S. Defense Intelligence Agency (DIA) and Department of the Treasury have provided characterizations, estimates, and updates regarding the financial support. According to the Department of the Treasury, the most revealing source on ISIS-Core financial support, ISIS-Core continues to directly fund ISIS-K, a province it views as a viable region to increase operational, fundraising, recruitment, and attack capabilities.

The report states that ISIS-Core money transfers, “hundreds of thousands of dollars,” largely originating in Somalia, are conducted over a variety of funds transfer mechanisms, including virtual asset service providers and hawalas, transiting through financial facilitators in Turkey and Yemen, noting that Turkey remains a key hub for ISIS to transfer funds, weapons, and operatives between the Middle East, South Asia, and Europe. The report specifically identifies three significant cases of the ISIS-Core's financing of ISIS-K, the first of which was a 2021 transfer of funds from a Somalia-based ISIS network to ISIS-K with the probable intent of supporting external operations plotting in Europe.

The second case concerned the provision of funds by ISIS-Core leaders to ISIS-K, specifically earmarked for use in external operations plots in Europe — funds that were moved through financial facilitators and supported successful attacks, including at least one attack in Russia. The third case identified transfers from Bilal al-Sudani, a key ISIS leader overseeing the organization's presence in Africa, to ISIS-K in late 2022. Bilal al-Sudani was killed by the United States military in January 2023 in a raid on his cave complex in northern Somalia. Citing an anonymous senior U.S. official, the New York Times reported shortly after his death that "Al-Sudani helped to put money in the pockets of the same elements of ISIS-K responsible for [the suicide bombing at] Abbey Gate."

Reports from DIA describe some probable reliance by ISIS-K on funding from ISIS-Core since April 2022, though no amount or estimate is provided. In Q4 (October–December) 2022, the report stated “This quarter, the international leadership of ISIS (ISIS-Core) almost certainly provided direct financial support to ISIS-K and exercises a degree of control over its Afghan affiliate through leadership appointment and financial support, the DIA said.” Later, in Q3 (July–September) of 2023, the report for the first time suggested that there had been no indications of ISIS-Core financial support to ISIS-K in the quarter, writing “The DIA said that it did not observe ISIS-K receive direct support from ISIS-Core or other ISIS branches, foreign actors, or other violent extremist groups this quarter.”

=== Ismatullah Khalozai ===
Among a number of individuals sanctioned by the United States for support to ISIS-K, Ismatullah Khalozai was sanctioned on 22 November 2021 for directly providing financial support to ISIS-K on behalf of the senior leadership of the ISIS-Core. According to the Office of Foreign Assets Control (OFAC), Khalozai operated a Turkey-based hawala business which he used for two years to transfer funds to finance ISIS-K operations and carry out tasks directly for senior ISIS-Core leaders. Khalozai is also accused of conducting human smuggling operations for ISIS-K and operating a UAE-based financing scheme which involved sending luxury items to international destinations for resale to generate funds for ISIS-K prior to his role in Turkey.

== Taxation ==
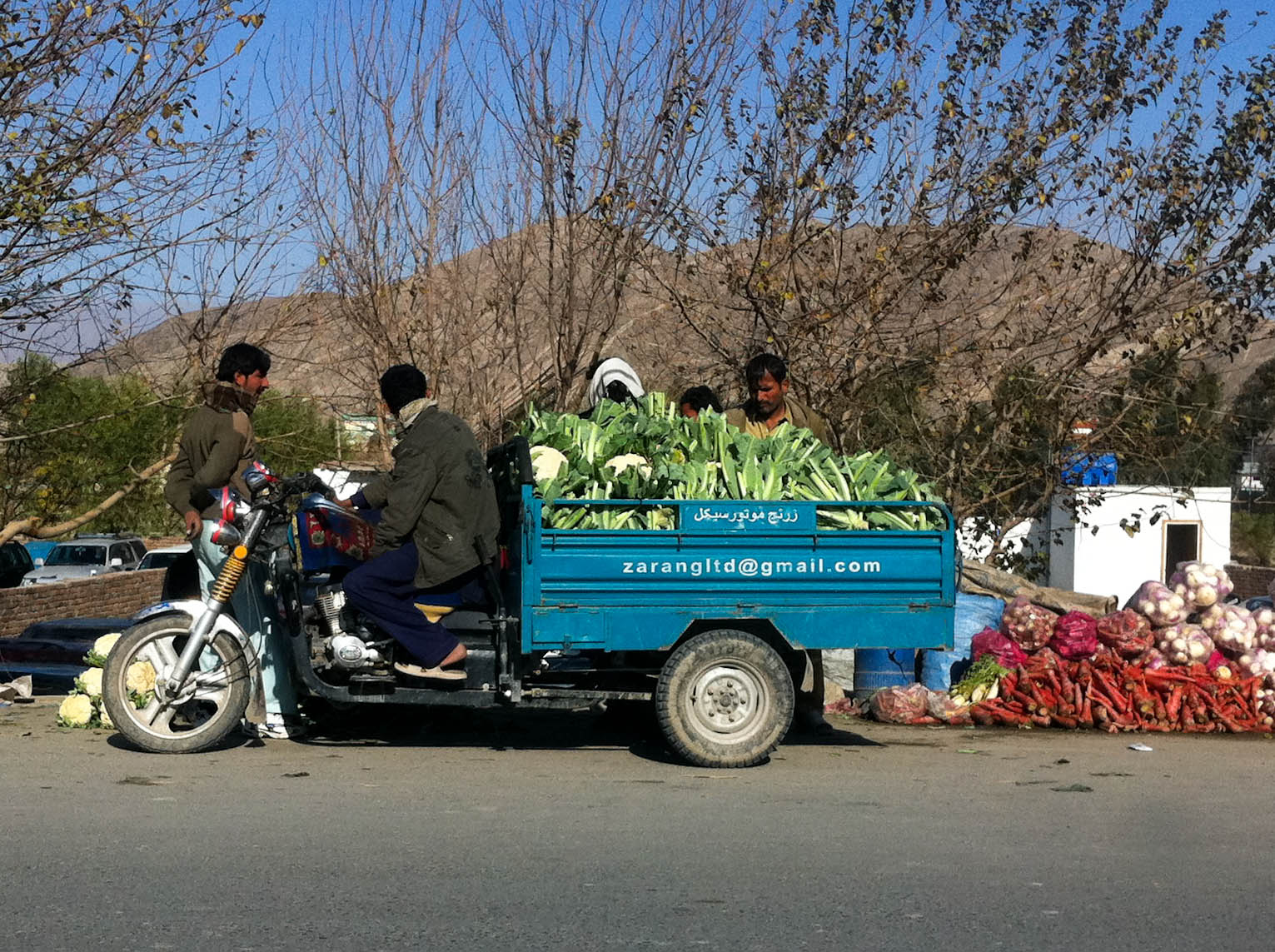
Farmer in Jalalabad brings harvest to market

In 2015, the year ISIS-Core announced the establishment of ISIS-K, the former gave instructions to begin local "taxation" like a legitimate government, lifting previous guidance forbidding ISIS-K from raising finances, i.e., "collecting taxes" in order to avoid clashes with other militant groups collecting taxes in the region, including the Afghan and Pakistani Taliban. Interviewed in December 2015, an ISIS-K member in Herat explained, "Daesh told us that we must find some local source of money, which can help us. We are extracting from mines and collecting taxes from the people. They have told us that we need to make a lot of money for the future. We need to have a budget to buy weapons and ammunition for ourselves. Before we did not have permission to collect money." ISIS-K began to internally generate revenue by taxing local businesses and citizens, seizing and taxing mines, operating illegal checkpoints to extort truck drivers, kidnapping for ransom, and (for a time) taxing the abundant narcotics traffickers. In a 2016 report to Congress, the Pentagon stated "command and control and funding from core ISIL is limited. Rather than relying on external funding, IS-K is attempting to develop its funding streams within Afghanistan, which has put it into conflict with the Taliban and other groups vying to raise revenue from illegal checkpoints and the trade of illicit goods."

ISIS-K invoked Islamic religious authorities to collect its taxes, specifically Zakat and Ushr. Zakat (Arabic: زكاة, lit. 'that which purifies') is a form of almsgiving (approximately 2.5% of one's wealth) often collected by the Muslim Ummah and is a religious duty for all Muslims as one of the Five Pillars of Islam. Notably, According to classical Islamic jurists, if the collector is unjust in the collection of zakat but just in its distribution, the concealment of property from him is allowed. If, on the other hand, the collector is just in the collection but unjust in the distribution, the concealment of property from him is an obligation (wajib). The Islamic State in Iraq and Syria, as well as its geographically dispersed provinces, all use Zakat to collect taxes from subjects. ISIS-K also reportedly collected Ushr, a 10% tax on the harvests of land dependent on irrigation or rainwater or 5% tax on those dependent on well water. Zakat and Ushr have played significant roles in Islamic history and, in support of ISIS-K's narrative, were both mandated during historic Islamic caliphates.

Numerous ISIS-K sources adamantly argued that the group deliberately avoided taxing the poor farmers that constitute much of the Afghan agricultural economy, focusing its tax collection on the shopkeepers of the bazaars and the wealthy, whom it comprehensively taxed. A village elder in Helmand explained the taxes were collected "not from the village and elders, but they did collect tax from the businessmen, shopkeepers, and drug traffickers. In this way, Daesh were completely different from the Taliban. The Taliban collected Zakat from the villagers but Daesh took Zakat or tax from shopkeepers, drug traffickers, and businessmen."

Taxes collected varied between provinces. Below is a sample of monthly collection provided by ISIS-K finance officials in Kunar, Nangarhar, Farah, Herat and Kunduz Provinces between October 2015 and March 2017.

Sample of tax collection rates by province
Province	Year	Monthly collection rate	Estimated year total
Zabul	2014	$500,000	$6,000,000
Zabul	2015	$1,000,000	$12,000,000
Herat	2015	$2,500,000	$30,000,000
Farah	2015	$500,000	$6,000,000
Nangarhar	2016	$4,700,000	$56,400,000
Kunar	2016	$1,500,000	$18,000,000
Helmand	2016	$1,900,000	$22,800,000

=== Narcotics trade ===
Narcotics trade, particularly opium poppies, has been a critical facet of ISIS-K's revenue generation in Afghanistan. Before the ban imposed in November 2015, ISIS-K strategically positioned itself to control heroin refineries, many of which were concentrated in districts under its sway, such as Achin, Momand Dara, Shinwari, and Chaparhar. The group, adhering to Shari’a principles, initially imposed zakat and ushr on poppy cultivation, adding a religious dimension to its taxation strategies.

The ban on poppies, ostensibly driven by internal power dynamics and efforts to bring order within ISIS-K, marked a significant shift in the group's financial landscape. It coincided with Abu Yasir al-Afghani's initiatives to streamline ISIS-K's operations and eliminate internal contentions over control of drug revenue. The ban, however, had broader implications, disrupting a major revenue stream and necessitating adjustments in ISIS-K's financial approach.

The ban's timing raises questions, as it was lifted in specific regions like southwest Afghanistan and Baluchistan in January 2017. This temporal correlation suggests a potential response to financial exigencies faced by IS-Central in Syria and Iraq, emphasizing the interconnected nature of the group's financial strategies on a global scale. It also underscores the pragmatic considerations within IS-K, allowing localized adaptations for economic gains.

The ban's implementation did not preclude the use of individuals with backgrounds in the drug trade, exemplified by figures like Abdul Zahir Brahawi, whose family members continued trading opium and heroin throughout the prohibition. Brahawi and others lobbied for lifting the ban, asserting its impediment to ISIS-K's progress in regions notorious for drug trafficking.

=== Kidnapping for ransom ===
Kidnapping and demanding ransom, one of ISIS-K's historic sources of revenue, is a common practice for armed insurgent and terrorist groups including the Islamic State's abduction of hundreds of Assyrian Christians in Syria for ransom, and the Islamic State's kidnapping-for-ransom schemes in its African provinces. Even in the region, armed groups including Tehrik-e Taliban Pakistan (TTP), and both the Taliban and Haqqani network prior to the United States withdrawal from Afghanistan, engage in kidnapping for ransom, often in Kabul. Even before ISIS-K was officially announced by ISIS-Core in January 2015, the group had allegedly carried out over 300 such kidnapping for ransoms with ransom prices starting as low as $20,000. This model, though generating sizable income for the group, came to alienate locals in Nangarhar Province (ISIS-K's core base of operations). These locals, who initially favored ISIS-K in its early days, soon became disenfranchised with the increasingly brutal governance including kidnappings for ransom as well as strict sharia law, school closures, public executions, killings of tribal elders, destruction of Sufi shrines, and bans on cigarettes.

=== Mining industry ===
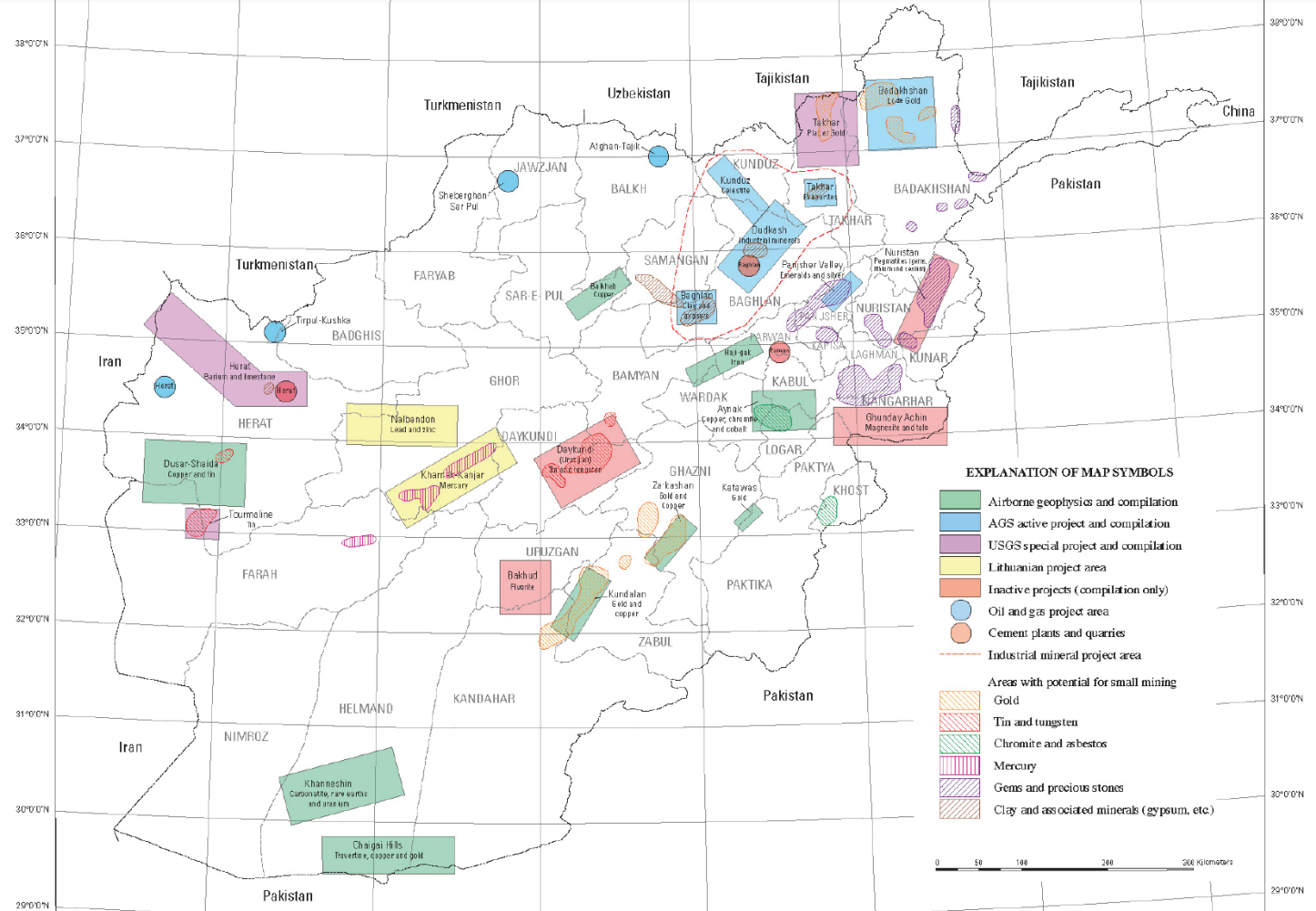
Valuable mineral areas in Afghanistan

Afghanistan, though one of the world's poorest nations, ranks sixth among nations by largest rare earth element reserves, a resource largely untapped because of the nation's lack of industrialization. The landlocked country sits atop an estimated $1 trillion worth mineral deposits including sizable deposits of iron, copper, gold, and lithium, as well as the rare earth elements in Helmand Province near the village of Khanashin where minerals from an extinct volcano now lay worth approximately $7.4 billion, according to the United States Geological Survey and Department of Defense.

During 2016, ISIS-K seized a number of mines, taxing profits and the transport of goods and in some cases directly taking control of mining activities. In Helmand Province in the south, ISIS-K seized a mine at the dormant Koh-i Khan Neshin stratovolcano, known for rare earth elements such as uranium and carbonatites. In the same year, ISIS-K took control of marble, talc, and luminescent mineral mining profits in the Nangarhar districts of Hissarak, Achin, Kot, Shinwar. Although no public quantization exists of income generated by ISIS-K's control over the mining industry, the group reportedly taxed the mining businesses anywhere between 200 and 500 Pakistani Rupees per ton extracted (material dependent) or 20% of the minerals' value.

=== Illegal checkpoints ===
According to a 2016 interview with village elders in December 2015, ISIS-K operated illegal checkpoints stopping trucks and charging drivers up to $9,000. This form of extortion is historically common in Afghanistan and was employed by a number of armed groups between the Soviet withdrawal in 1989 and the 1996 capture of Kabul by the Afghan Taliban, a period with no effective national government and two civil wars (1989–1992 and 1992–1996).

== International funding ==
The total amount of international financial donations received by ISIS-K is not publicly known, but the group has provided estimates suggesting an influx of $129–$181 million in 2015 and around $160 million in 2016, compared to $100 million in support from ISIS-Core in 2015 and $78 million in 2016. The sharp drop in foreign government funding between the two years, a loss of between $23–$75 million, was partially offset by a near doubling of international private donors which netted an additional $54 million increase in 2016. This change, along with a decrease in funds provided by ISIS-Core implies that both foreign governments and ISIS-Core felt more comfortable reducing financial support with a strong uptick in private donations to the group.

ISIS-K External Funding Estimates from 2015 to 2016
	2015	2016	Change ($)	Change (%)
Foreign Governments	$63,000,000 to $115,000,000	$40,000,000	▼ -$23,000,000 to ▼ -$75,000,000	▼ -36.5% to ▼-65.2%
Private Donors	$66,000,000	$120,000,000	▲ +$54,000,000	▲ +81.8%
ISIS-Core	$100,000,000	$78,000,000	▼ -$22,000,000	▼ -22.0%
Total:	$229,000,000 to $281,000,000	$238,000,000	▲ +$9,000,000 to ▼ -$43,000,000	▲ +3.93% to ▼ -15.3%

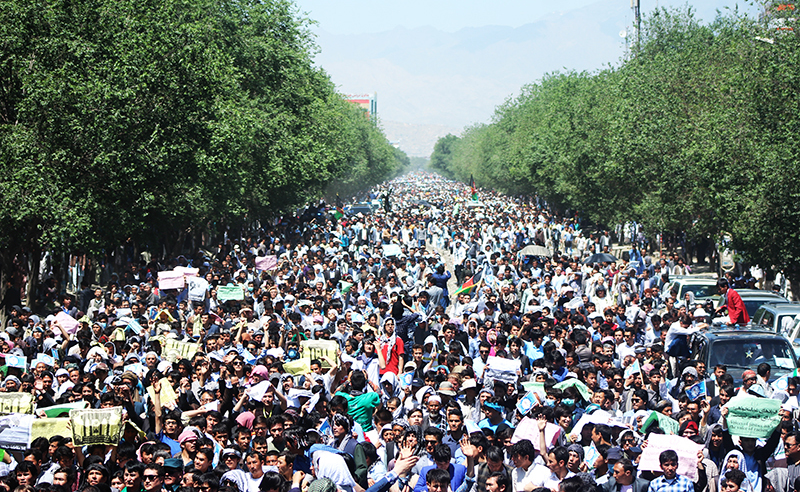
Shia Hazara in Kabul hours before bombing

Motivations for these governments to support ISIS-K varies, but interviews with private donors from these Gulf countries and ISIS-K Finance Commission leaders suggest two principal reasons. The first is sectarian support to radical Sunni organizations that challenge or attack Shia groups, whether it be ISIS-K's long-distant vision to establish a Sunni Islamic caliphate in the historic region of Khorasan which includes much of eastern Iran or attacks on Shia Muslims (primarily the Hazara minority in Afghanistan), and shrines in Afghanistan and Pakistan.

ISIS-K has demonstrated its hatred for Shia Muslims through repeated terrorist attacks and suicide bombings, including its third deadliest attack ever, the 23 July 2016 twin bombing during a protest in Kabul which killed at least 97 Shia Hazara Afghans and injured over 260. The second motivating reason for Gulf governments to provide financial support to ISIS-K is belief that the group, should it effectively expand its operations (and supposedly one day its caliphate) into the Central Asian states of Tajikistan, Uzbekistan, and Turkmenistan, would bring Islamic terrorist pressure into the southern belly of the Soviet sphere of influence and Russia's southern border, prompting it to withdraw its forces from Syria and end its intervention in the nation.

These perceptions of Gulf governments and private donors alike are critical to ISIS-K's funding stream, and therefore the group is strongly incentivized to inflate claims of success to gain and retain foreign financial support. As an example, one Qatari private donor reported being told by ISIS-K that the group controlled sixty districts and 28% of Afghanistan in mid-2016 and that ISIS-K was successfully preventing the deployment of Shia militia groups from Afghanistan to the conflict in Syria, both of which were far from reality.

In another case, following the 23 July 2016 bombing of a Shia Hazara protest, ISIS-K advertised to its donors that it had killed 500 Hazaras when the actual death toll reports 97 dead. In a third example, a Pakistani donor in January 2016 believed claims by ISIS-K that the group was engaged in 'large scale operations against American, British, and Afghan government forces' even though the group wasn't to launch their first real offensive until late summer that year. Reports among some donors indicated that they had reduced their support to ISIS-K and some were considering suspending donations because they believed the group was too caught up in conflicts with the Afghan Taliban. An ISIS-K leader admitted the same:

The donors have been telling us that we must be more active. They said that we must continue fighting and we are indeed increasing operations now. They have said that we must increase attacks. Rather than East Afghanistan, we are being asked to give a lot of importance to Shi'a areas and Central Asia, along with operations in the Northern Provinces of Afghanistan from where we must enter Central Asia. So they have been bringing pressure on us, telling us that we must increase the number of operations and capture more areas. The fighting which started in Nangarhar [in the summer of 2016] is a result of the pressure of these donors.

— Interview with ISIS-K leader in July 2016

== Private donations ==
Private donations from foreign donors, nearly entirely from Sunni Gulf countries, constitute one of, if not the, largest revenue stream for ISIS-K. The group lacked the connection to foreign private donors early in its development, but once the province was officially announced by ISIS-Core in Iraq and Syria in January 2015, a number of private donors were redirected by ISIS-Core to begin donating to Khorasan Province instead of the Islamic State in Iraq and Syria. Private donors primarily came from Qatar, Kuwait, UAE, Saudi Arabia, Iraq, Syria, and Egypt with top donors paying millions of dollars' worth each year, but the majority pay hundreds of thousands of dollars per year. Private donors are usually wealthy individuals, businessmen, government contractors, and reportedly some were members of royal families; most of the Saudi royal family, but also members of Emirati, Kuwaiti, and Qatari royal families.

To attract and manage the vital foreign donors, the ISIS-K Finance Commission established the group Community of Support for the Mujahideen (Pashto: مجاهدینو سره د مرستی ټولنه, romanized: Mujahideno Sara Da Marasti Tolana) to manage funding from external donors. The organization, totaling around eighty in staff, established offices abroad in the cities of Doha, Qatar; Jebel Ali, United Arab Emirates; Al Ain, United Arab Emirates; Medina, Saudi Arabia; and Riyadh, Saudi Arabia — strongly indicative of where the majority of ISIS-K's donors could be found. It also sent lobbyists to Middle East and South Asian countries to connect wealthy potential donors with ISIS-K.

Private donors were afforded special relationships with ISIS-K leaders, which sometimes created disruptive complexities for the group when different groups of donors would establish close relationships with prominent leaders of the various subgroups that coalesced to form ISIS-K. These different donor groups often had competing visions. At points, TKK and Muslim Dost had allegedly formed closer relations with Qatari donors (who contributed $20 million that year) while the Saudis aligned with Khilafat Afghan, TKP and Azizullah. These arrangements appeared to turn when the Qataris grew closer to Hafiz Saeed Khan (and TKP as a whole), and Khilafat Afghan as the Saudis warmed to Khilafat Afghan. These shifting streams of donations and relationships, along with the fact that two other subgroups, the Omar Ghazi Group and Shamali Khilafat, failed to achieve any similar connections with Gulf donors, suggest that ISIS-K had generally failed to truly unify and centralize income generation.

ISIS-K characterizes the motivations of private donors in the Gulf to ISIS-K stating:

First of all they are rich people and they think they have to give 1–2 percent to jihadists to secure a place in heaven. The second reason is that they are against the Shi'a. The say that Shi'as have a relationship with Iran and IS is against the Shi'a, so they support us. These people are from Saudi Arabia, Qatar, and Kuwait, and are encouraged by their governments to support ISIS, but in the UAE the private donors are without government support.

— Member of the ISIS-K Finance Commission in June 2016

== Foreign government donations ==
Beyond private donors from the Persian Gulf, a number of Gulf countries face allegations by foreign leaders, intelligence services, and admissions by ISIS-K's Finance Commission, of secretly providing financial support to ISIS-K.

=== Qatar ===
The State of Qatar, more than any other nation, faces significant allegations of clandestine financial support for ISIS-K from a variety of foreign leaders, Pakistani intelligence, researchers, and even leaders within ISIS-K's Finance Commission. According to a leader in the ISIS-K Finance Commission, the Qatari government began supporting the al-Nusra Front and ISIS-K under what was known as the "Khorasan project" as early as 2013, a year before ISIS declared itself in Iraq and Syria and two years before ISIS-K would be announced by ISIS-Core. As of April 2015, the ISIS-K delegation in Qatar's capital of Doha was reportedly led by Mawlawi Nasratullah Popalzai, the leader of Tehrik-e Khalifat Khorasan (TKK), one of the largest groups to originally coalesce into ISIS-K, further highlighting the financial importance ISIS-K saw in Qatar.

Beyond longtime claims by Russia and Iran of Qatari support for the movement, a source in Pakistan's ISI alleged that both the governments of Qatar and Saudi Arabia provided ISIS-K with funds, trainers, and advisors. In one of the few books dedicated to ISIS-K, British researcher Antonio Giustozzi expresses support for claims of probable financial support to ISIS-K from the government of Qatar writing "Whether these allegations are credible or not... the question remains of whether private donors could really operate without some tacit consent by the authorities."

=== Kingdom of Saudi Arabia ===
The government of the Kingdom of Saudi Arabia has faced allegation, including by private donors, that it secretly financially supports ISIS-K in Afghanistan, though the public lacks concrete evidence to either confirm or deny these allegations.

Saudi Arabia faces numerous allegations, including from the then-Vice President Joe Biden, British Labour Party Leader Jeremy Corbyn, and Iraqi Prime Minister Nouri al-Maliki, that its government secretly funds and arms the Islamic State in Iraq and Syria. A report by the Washington Institute for Near East Policy on Saudi Arabia's funding of ISIS suggests that Riyadh benefits from ISIS's (a Sunni extremist organization) success against Iraq's Shiite government and Bashr al-Assad's Syrian government, but withholds serious support for the movement out of fears of blowback. The report cites a series of radical Islamic terrorist attacks in the kingdom from returning mujahideen in the Soviet-Afghan War, a movement heavily funded by the Saudi government, as the basis for its policy of restraint in supporting radical jihadist organizations.

=== Kuwait ===
Despite some allegations that the government of the State of Kuwait secretly provides financial support to ISIS-K, a majority of international concern regarding Kuwait surrounds the nation's permissive environment for international funding to the Islamic State in the Levant and in Afghanistan. One report from the Washington Institute for Near East Policy states that Kuwait is "long considered one of the most permissive terrorism financing environments in the Persian Gulf." Another report from the Carnegie Endowment for International Peace writes "Kuwait has served as a clearinghouse. The tiny Gulf country of just over 3 million lacked a counterterrorist financing law until [the summer of 2013], and the new legislation has yet to be fully implemented. Donors have taken advantage not just of Kuwait's poor legal framework but also its pluralistic political environment, where free assembly and private charities are permitted."

== See also ==
- Islamic State – Khorasan Province
- Finances of the Islamic State
- Terrorism financing
- State-sponsored terrorism
