= Rodat District =

- District
- Interactive map of Rodat District
- Coordinates: 35°0′N 68°51′E
- Country: Afghanistan
- Province: Nangarhar Province
- No. of villages: 25
- Capital: Hisaar-e-Shahi

Area
  - Total: 599 km^{2} (231 sq mi)

Population (2010)
  - Total: 110,000
- Time zone: UTC+04:30 (AST)

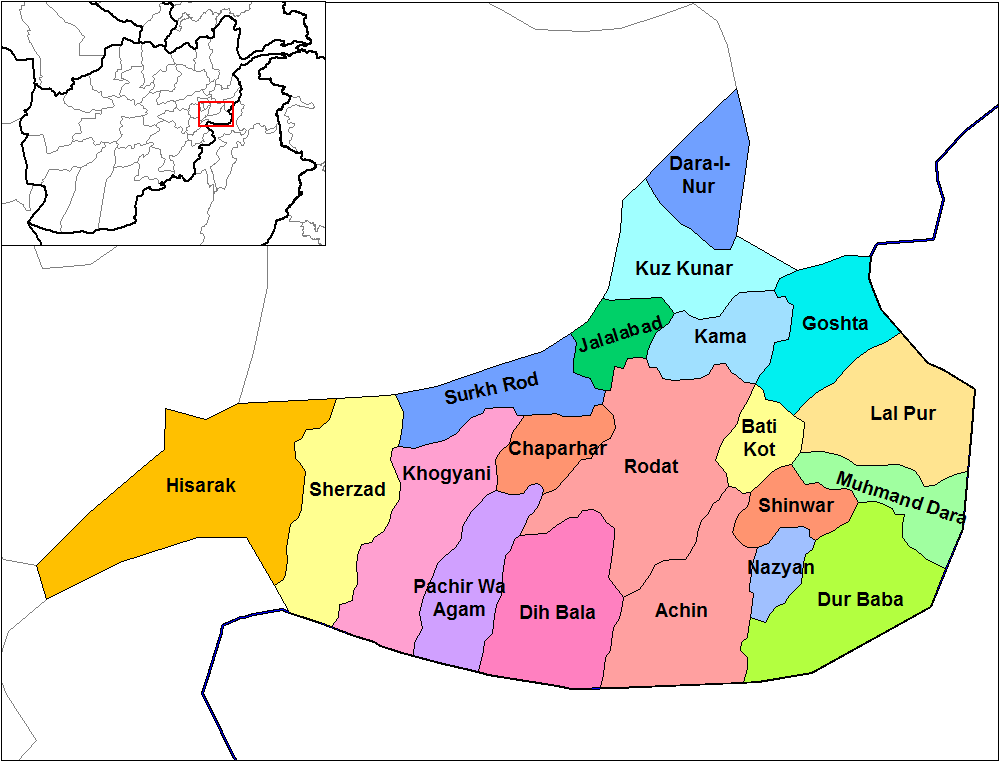
Nangarhar districts.

Rodat District (Pashto: رودات ولسوالۍ); is a district in the center of Nangarhar Province, 25 km away from Jalalabad city. Afghanistan, south of Jalalabad. The district is within the heartland of the Momand tribe of Pashtuns.

== Demographics ==
Rodat population, which is 100% Pashtun, was estimated at 110,000 in 2010, of whom 20,000 were children under 12.

In 2004, parts of Rodat District were separated to form Kot, Chaparhar, and Batikot Districts, but in 2009 people from Hisaar-e-Shahi captured a big flat area and named the place as Shahidano Khargotai resulting of killing two innocent villagers in clashes. Hisaar-e-Shahi is the center of Rodat where hospitals, district police office and other important government buildings are located.

== Infrastructure ==
On June 16, 2009, the PRT in Nangarhar with the construction of the District police station. The PRT visited the district to inspect construction sites and provide updates to locals regarding PRT projects. Moreover, Roshan Telecom has provided special help to Sultan Mosque the leading spot in Rodat. UNHCR has also helped through shelter system. Hisar-e-Shahi Industrial Park (HIP) is located 22 km southeast of Jalalabad City, on Jalalabad-Torkham Highway with a total area of 207ha. For the HIP infrastructure development World Bank (WB) was the main donor. USAID also assisted AISA in development of internal roads in its second phase of HIP.

== Economy and agriculture ==
Rodat has sizable amounts of irrigated land as one can find scores of vegetables and fruits of Rodat in Kabul, notably onions. Other main crops in Rodat include wheat and cotton as many people living in the area are involved in agricultural trade and business. Rodat is known for its famous sweet fig in summer which are exported to Kabul and other areas of Afghanistan. Rodat district is famous for many things: Ghazi Amanullah khan kharghotai, vegetable oil, farming, and pottery.

== Tribes and villages ==
Villages are: Hissar-e-shahi, Tatang Kaly, Chaghari, Qazi Qala, Kaan Dehkan, laghar juy, Kan Momand, Qadrzai, Zakhil, tor baba, Hisarak, Roghani, Kadae, Kamar, Sraa Qala, Mufti Qala, Mazina, Banda, Hisarak, Baroo, Kuza Qala, Sangar. Tribes are: Akhundzadgan and tribe; one of the biggest tribe of Nangarhar province with further sub-tribes, Natakhail, Shahdikhail, Wazir (Galakhil, Dawrankhil) Momand (Halimzai, Daudzai), Malakhil, Durani, Alkozai, Noorzai, Sadat, Sahibzadagan, Miran, Qadu khail, Gasi Khail, Hasan Khail, Ali Mohamad Khail and Hazratan. Another sizeable tribe that also has roots from Rodat is Hazarbuz.

== Education ==
The district has 40 primary girls and boys schools and 10 high school For boys and 8 high schools for girls. Ahdad Lycee, a famous high school of Nangarhar province, is also located in Rodat. Besides 14th grade InService for teachers have also been initiated by ministry of education. The Sultan Mosque is located in the center of Rodat city. A vast playing ground in the center of Hisaar-e-Shahi is also located where students and youth play cricket and football.

== Climate ==
Rodat climat comprises three seasons. They are the summer months that spans from mid April to the end of June. The rainy season in Rodat is from the months of early July to end of September. The winter season in Rodat is experienced during the months of early December to the end of February.

== Marriage ==
Marriages are very simple in Rodat as at first agreement is made between the two families and simple wedding takes place following engagement during which guests are invited normally for dinner. "Traditionally" the grooms parents are responsible for the rehearsal dinner and that's about it and early morning bride is taken to groom home accompanied by a number of people. No lavish exchange is made as wedding is totally free from opposite party and according to instructions of Islam.

== Security ==
Rodat has been a safe place through its history as no operation or militancy has been faced in Hamid Karzai regime except incident of open firing of US Troops on school students in 2008. Rodat has shown its complete security and stability in the past. During Jihad people bravely stood against Communism and Khalq, Parcham. The result of no violence in area is current development of Rodat.

As of 2011 this is not safe, since the last presidential elections government weakens day to another many illegal aliens have dissolved to the key management positions which allow them feel free to do anything and as long as its central location is concerned except Kama (a neighboring district in the region) the rest of the surrounding districts have turned Roodat into a focal point of conflicts. Targeting particular personalities (such as military, Doctors and engineers) and exposure relevant families to a huge risk of death is in its high peak.
