= Killi Kateer =

MARI Abad
- Town
- Location within Pakistan
- Coordinates: 31°30′N 67°36′E 31°5′0″N 67°6′20″E
- Country: Pakistan
- Province: Balochistan
- District: Quetta District
- Time zone: UTC+5 (PST)

Killi Kateer Kuchlak is a small village near Kuchlak some kilometers far away from the Valley of Quetta in Pakistan. The majority of the village's residents are tribal people, and the Kasi are the ancient residents of the area. Various tribes including the Achakzai, Syeds, Khurasani,
