= Shinwari =

Pashtun tribe

شينواری
- Malak Azad Khan Shinwari, a Shinwari Malak, 1878. A sketch by William Simpson

Total population
- Estimated 1 million

Regions with significant populations
- Afghanistan; Pakistan

Languages
- Pashto

Religion
- Sunni Islam

Related ethnic groups
- Kasi · Mohmand · Yusufzai · Durrani and other Sarbani Pashtun tribes

The Shinwari (Pashto: شينواري) are an ethnic Pashtun tribe of Afghanistan and Pakistan. Among the greatest poets of the Pashto language in the 20th century was the late Ameer Hamza Shinwari, also known as "Hamza Baba".

The Shinwari tribe are descended from the Kasi Pashtun tribe settled in the southern districts of Nangarhar Province, in Haska Meyna, Achin, Rodat, Bati Kot, Kot, Chaprahar, Shinwar, Dor Baba and Nazian districts. A major portion of the tribe is centered in Jalalabad and Parwan province of Afghanistan, and Khyber Pass, Pakistan. These Shinwaris are mostly traders and businessmen. There are around 15000 Shinwaris settled in Jungle Khel village Kohat, Pakistan, believed to have settled through a common ancestor name Kala Khan who has a tomb on the hills (tor speen). There are also more than 3,000 Shinwaris settled in the Alizai village, 15 km away from Kohat, Pakistan. Mirdad Khel, a sub-tribe of the Shinwaris, migrated to Swat Valley during the 1750s and settled there. Among them one of the notable Shinwaris is Senator Abdul Rahim Mirdad Khel. In Afghanistan, the Shinwari are also located in the Kunar Valley. Reporting from 2010 states that there are around 400,000 Shinwari in Afghanistan.

== Location ==
The Shinwari tribe is settled in the southern districts of Nangarhar Province, in Haska Meyna, Achin, Rodat, Bati Kot, Kot, Chaprahar, Shinwar, Dor Baba and Nazian districts. A major portion of this tribe is also settled between Landi Kotal (Pakistan) and Jalalabad (Afghanistan), as well as in Parwan province of Afghanistan where they are concentrated in Shinwari, Ghorband, and Jabalussaraj districts. These Shinwaris are mostly traders and businessmen.

There is also a significant minority of the tribe settled in Kohat and Hangu (Jangal Khel, Haji Abad, Mohallah Sangirh), Pakistan, a settlement 60 km south of Peshawar. Prominently, the Shinwaris of Jangal Khel, Kohat have attained a significant population numbering around 15000/20000, having produced many prominent educated persons who have distinguished themselves in various professions and service of Pakistan. In Afghanistan, the Shinwari are also located in Kunar, Bajaur Agency and Lower Dir. At Lower Dir, Munjai village contains a huge population of the Shinwari tribe, which had migrated from Afghanistan to Chamrakand (Mohmand Agency and Bajaur Agency) in the 1890s, and settled in the fertile land of Munjai village in Lower Dir. Reporting from 2010 states that there are around 400,000 Shinwari in Afghanistan. The Shinwaris reside in hilly areas with narrow valleys such as in the Khyber Agency where mountain ranges meet there: Lacha Gar, Karagah Ghar, Surghar, Tor Ghar Morgah, and Kalauch. The famous Khyber Pass, at 1,180 meters (3,870 ft.) ASL, is the gateway to Afghanistan through the Kuh-e Sefid range.

The Khyber Agency has two major rivers. The Bara River in the southern Khajuri Plain provides for relatively arable farm land. The Kabul River forms the northern boundary, separating Khyber from Mohmand Agency. Another river in the agency is the Chora, which flows east-northeast on the north side of the Surghar range. Valleys: Maidan, Rujgal, Bara, Bazaar, Choora, Wachpal and Tirah.

Khyber Agency experiences hot temperatures during the summer season, May through August. Maximum temperatures may reach 104 degrees, while the lower average 79 degrees. During the cooler months of November through April, however, average high temperatures reach 64 degrees and lows dip to around 39 degrees. Average annual rainfall over the Khyber Agency is 15 to 16 inches

The elders of the Shinwari tribe in Nangarhar signed a pact, uniting against the Taliban. They promised that anyone supporting the Taliban, would be punished with fines and expulsion. This pact, which per The Times "appears to be the first" incident of an entire tribe declaring war against the Taliban, has invited comparison with the Sunni Awakening of 2006, which tipped the balance of power in Iraq against the Sunni insurgency. The pact also had economic implications that America offered over in development funding. Further, reports suggested the Shinwari were against Taliban interference with their traditional smuggling routes across the Pakistani border.

The security situation in Haska Mena district is getting worse daily due to the increased number of Taliban insurgents operating in Naria Aubo Village, Papen Village, Dara Village, Aughuz Village and other remote villages in the district, In December 2014, Most of the Taliban insurgents have changed from Taliban to ISIL-KP carrying out insurgent activities under the direct order of Abdul Khaliq, Who is the head of Taliban in Haska Mena. Several people were killed and injured during the insurgency in Haska Mena district, The most common are:

- Killing of General Kafee in Haska Mena due to his work with Ministry of Defence of Afghanistan in Jalalabad city.
- Killing of Masjid Mullah in Kutawal village, Haska Mena at night.
- Kidnapping of Deputy District Governor of Nangarhar Province, Mr. Nazifullah, but later released due to the intervention within district elders.
- Kidnapping and persecution of USAID contract driver, Mr. Baitullah in Haska Mena district due to working with the US government agencies, he was beaten, injured and wounded by cutting his right hand three fingers so that he can be not able to drive any more for USAID missions in Haska Mena. Later on he was also released on the intervention of the elder by the promise that he will not work anymore for any USAID or other government agencies. The district government was also unable to provide protection and help to this kind of peoples.
- Some Sub tribes of Shinwaris such as Mirdad Khel migrated to the Swat Valley in 1935 and then settled there.

== History ==
=== Mughal-era (1672) ===
The Shinwari tribesmen played a key part in defeating the Mughal forces in the battle of Ali masjid (1672)

=== British assessment (1885) ===
In 1885, a British author described the Shinwari ("Shanwari" in his text):

The Shanwari inhabit a portion of the Khaibar mountains, some of the eastern valleys of the Safed Koh, and are also found on the borders of Bajaur. They have five sections - Mandizai/Manduzai, Abdul Rahim, Sangu, Sipai, and Ali Sher. They have been continuously predatory since the British approached their borders. They are the most industrious carriers between Peshawur and the other marts on the way to Kabul, using mules and camels for carriage. They are brave, hospitable, stalwart and hardworking. They are well-educated people

== Feuds and alliances ==
The Shinwari tribe has been known to form alliances with the Mohmands, the Safis, and the Afridis.

However, some sources indicate that the Mohmand tribe is frequently in a state of conflict with the Shinwari tribe.

The Shinwari tribe has historically feuded with the Khogyani tribe, which is a Karlani sub-tribe. There are some historical inter-tribal feuds over land.

=== Role in the Anglo-Afghan War ===
During the First Afghan War, a raid on the Shinwarree valley was conducted in Nangarhar, on the 24th of July 1842 Shinwari tribesmen skirmished with the British invaders and another action occurred in the 26th of July where a larger British Artillery force engaged the tribesmen.

=== Role in the Khost Rebellion ===
During the Khost rebellion, the Shinwari aligned themselves with the Afghan Government and helped quell the revolt.

=== Role in 1929 Afghan Civil War ===
During the late 1928 riots, the Shinwari tribe were the first to openly rebel against king Amanullah Khan's imposition of various new laws, including the requirement to wear European dress, the rule that required them to send a quota of their daughters to Kabul for education and the impositions of taxes (they had never previously paid tax). The Shinwaris attacked Jalalabad, cutting off its water supply and closing the Kabul–Peshawar road. Amanullah responded by using his fledgling Air Force, including Soviet pilots, to bomb the Shinwaris. The use of foreign "infidels" to subjugate Muslims roused other tribes to revolt and the country descended into what would become the 1929 Afghan Civil War.

== Malak and jirga system ==
Like other Pashtun tribes, the Shinwari traditionally govern their communities through a system of tribal elders and councils based on Pashtunwali, the Pashtun social code.

=== Malak ===
A Malak (ملک) is the headman or representative of a tribe, clan or village. Among Pashtun tribes, each khel (clan) traditionally follows a malak, who is usually chosen from among the senior heads of its families. The malak acts as a link between the tribe and the government, distributes allowances within the community, and helps settle disputes between tribe members through the jirga. Alongside the malaks, respected elders known as mashar or spin giri ("white beards") also hold influence in tribal affairs.

=== Jirga ===
A jirga (جرګه) is a council of elders that makes decisions by consensus. It is convened to resolve disputes over matters such as land, family conflicts and inter-tribal relations. The elders usually sit in a circle, hear both sides, and reach a decision only after consultation among all members, so that the outcome represents the agreement of the community. In a private or tribal jirga, disputes are settled entirely by the malaks and elders without government involvement, and many tribespeople prefer this form of dispute resolution.

In recent decades, the traditional authority of malaks and jirgas in parts of the tribal areas has been weakened by conflict and the rise of militancy.

== Pashto dialect ==
The Shinwari speak the Northeastern variety of Northern Pashto, which is also spoken in Peshawar, parts of Nangarhar Province and northern Khyber Pakhtunkhwa by tribes such as the Yusufzai and Mohmand. Some of its consonants are very differ from the other dialects.

Dialects	ښ	ږ	څ	ځ	ژ
Shinwari Pashto	[x]	[ɡ]	[t͡s, s]	[d͡z, z]	[ʒ]
Yusufzai Pashto	[x]	[ɡ]	[s, t͡s]	[z]	[d͡ʒ]
Ghilji Pashto	[ç]	[ʝ]	[t͡s]	[z]	[ʒ, z]
Durrani Pashto	[ʂ]	[ʐ]	[t͡s]	[d͡z]	[ʒ]

Seekh kabab at Shinwari spot

== Cuisine ==
Shinwari cooking centres on lamb from the dumba (fat-tailed sheep) and uses very few spices. Lamb is prepared in three main ways: Shinwari tikka, which is salted, skewered and grilled; Shinwari karahi, cooked over high heat in its own fat; and dum pukht, slow-cooked in a pot sealed with flour. Because the flavour comes mainly from salt and fat, the meat must be fully dried and aged for one to two weeks. Shinwari karahi uses no ground spice except black pepper, relying instead on tomatoes and green chillies.

== Tribe ==
The Shinwaris are derived from the Kasi tribe, and are further distributed into sub-tribes:

Main Tribe
Sub-Tribe
Clans of Tribe
Subclans of Tribe
division of Tribe
Section of Subdivision
Minor Fractions
Other Fractions;
Shinwari
Mandizai / Manduzai
Hamza khel,

ilyas khel, Hasan khel

Ahmed Khel Maghdud khel Daulat khel

kotwal kuki khel Musi khel Umar khel Da Oghaz khel Mahmud Khel

Haska Meyna District, Nangarhar, Khyber

Ali Sher Khel
Adal khel,

Ash khel

Khuga khel Mirdad khel Utar khel

Piro khel Piset khel Shekhmal khel

Nangarhar, Khyber Pass, Swat Valley

Sangu Khel
Ghani khel
Haider khel kachkal khel Khani khel

Karmu khel Mirjan khel Mai khel Soulor ptar Mullagoris

Nangarhar, Landi Kotal

Sipai / Sephai
Rahimdad khel Haider khel

Suliman khel Babar khel Shabul khel

Akanmasi

Atanmasi Mama khel Aka khel

Fatima nmasi Nimidar khel Mamai khel Lalanmasi ya khel

Nangarhar, Khyber Agency

Mullagori

Soonkhel(found in nazyan)

Bu Saeed

Haji
Shibli Khel Abdur Rahim Khel

KobiZai
mir,chandio

Mehmood Khel Shinwaris of Dir Lower, Ancestry of Malak Mehmood Jan Shinwari/Fahm Jan Malak

district(dir lower)]

YahyaZai

AliZai
shairani, shaikhkhel

other Shinwaris

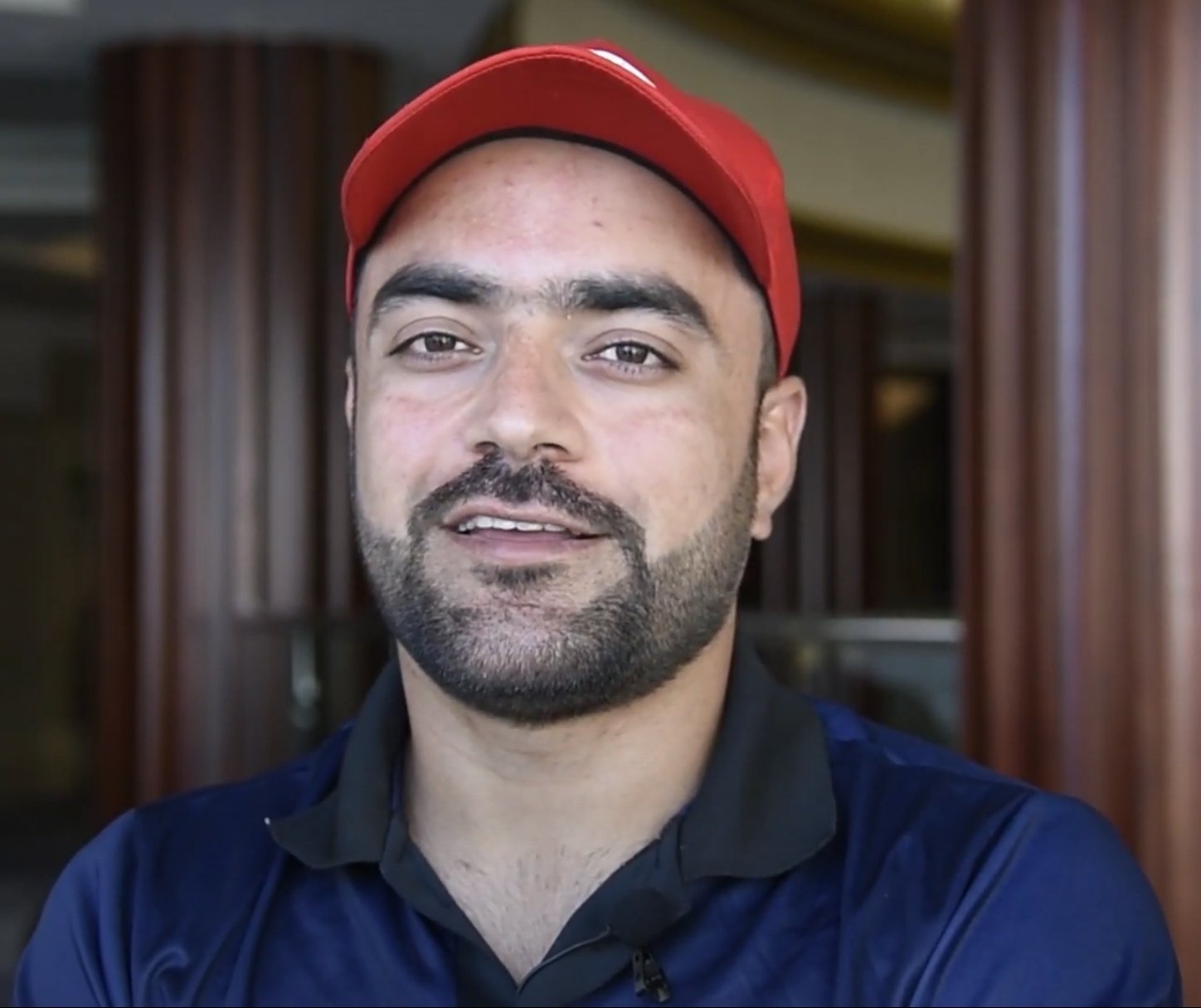
Rashid Khan, Afghan cricketer

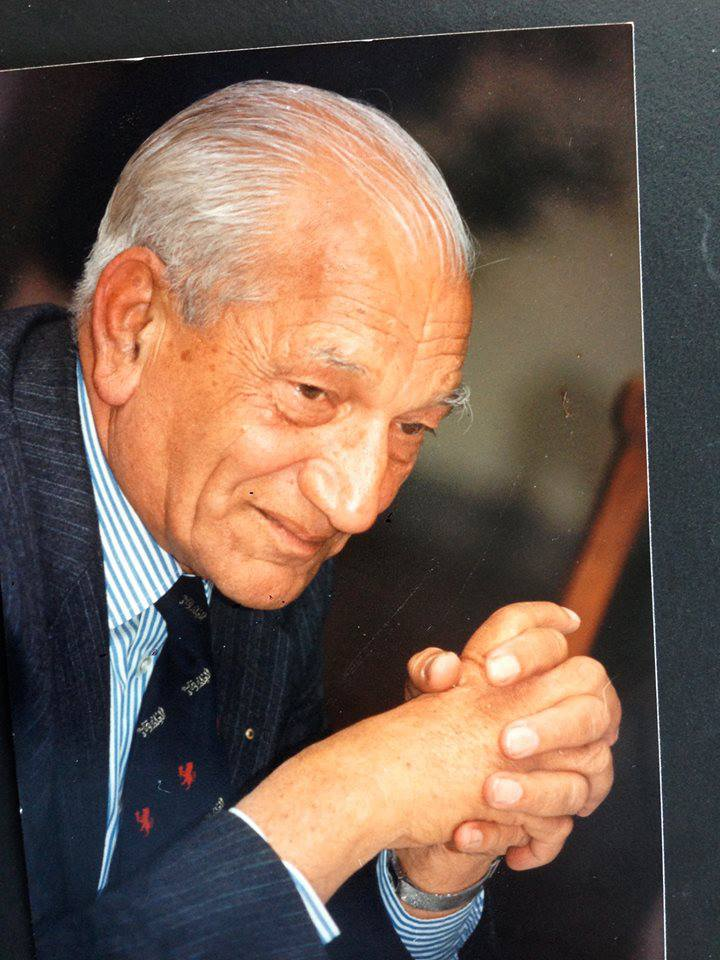
Abdul Qayum Sher, War Hero

== Notable Shinwari ==
- Ghalib Hassan, leader in the anti-Taliban resistance under Abdul Haq, appointed District Commander of Shinwar, Afghanistan by Hamid Karzai, held in extrajudicial detention in the United States' Guantanamo Bay detention camps, in Cuba
- Rashid Khan Arman, sportsman, member of the Afghanistan national cricket team from Nangarhar
- Abdul Qayum Sher, Pakistan Army war hero
- Khan Muhammad Azam Khan, one of the most prominent civil engineers and infrastructure pioneers in both pre- and post-independence Pakistan. He was a leading figure in early national development and served as a former President of the Pakistan Engineering Congress. Because of his vast contributions to regional development, public housing, and institutional leadership, he remains a highly respected figure in the history of Pakistani civil engineering. Later, as Chairman WAPDA East Pakistan, he hosted the late Queen Elizabeth and Prince Phillip. Notably, he was also the father of Brigadier Abdul Qayyum Sher, who would later become a war hero during the 1965 war between India and Pakistan. Both belonged to Jungle Khel, Kohat.
- Amir Hamza Shinwari, poet
- Faisal Ahmad Shinwari, Chief Justice of the Supreme Court of Afghanistan 2001–2006
- Malalai Shinwari, advocate
- Rafiq Shinwari, singer
- Bismillah Jan Shinwari, was an Afghan cricket umpire.
- Samiullah Shinwari, sportsman, member of the Afghanistan national cricket team
- Usman Khan Shinwari, sportsman, member of the Pakistan national cricket team.
- Dost Shinwari, was an Afghan writer, literary scholar, researcher, and poet.
- Haji Afzal Khan Haji Sher Muhammad Khan Haji Ghulam Khan Of Dehbala Afghanistan
- Israr Ahmed Shinwari, Police Service of Pakistan Inspector General of Police and IG Frontier Constabulary NWFP. He belonged to Jungle Khel, Kohat.

== See also ==
- Demographics of Pakistan

== Other sources ==
- "Bride among 23 people killed in US bombardment of wedding party in Nangarhar « RAWA News". Rawa.org.
