= Mirmon Ayesha =

Afghan royal consort

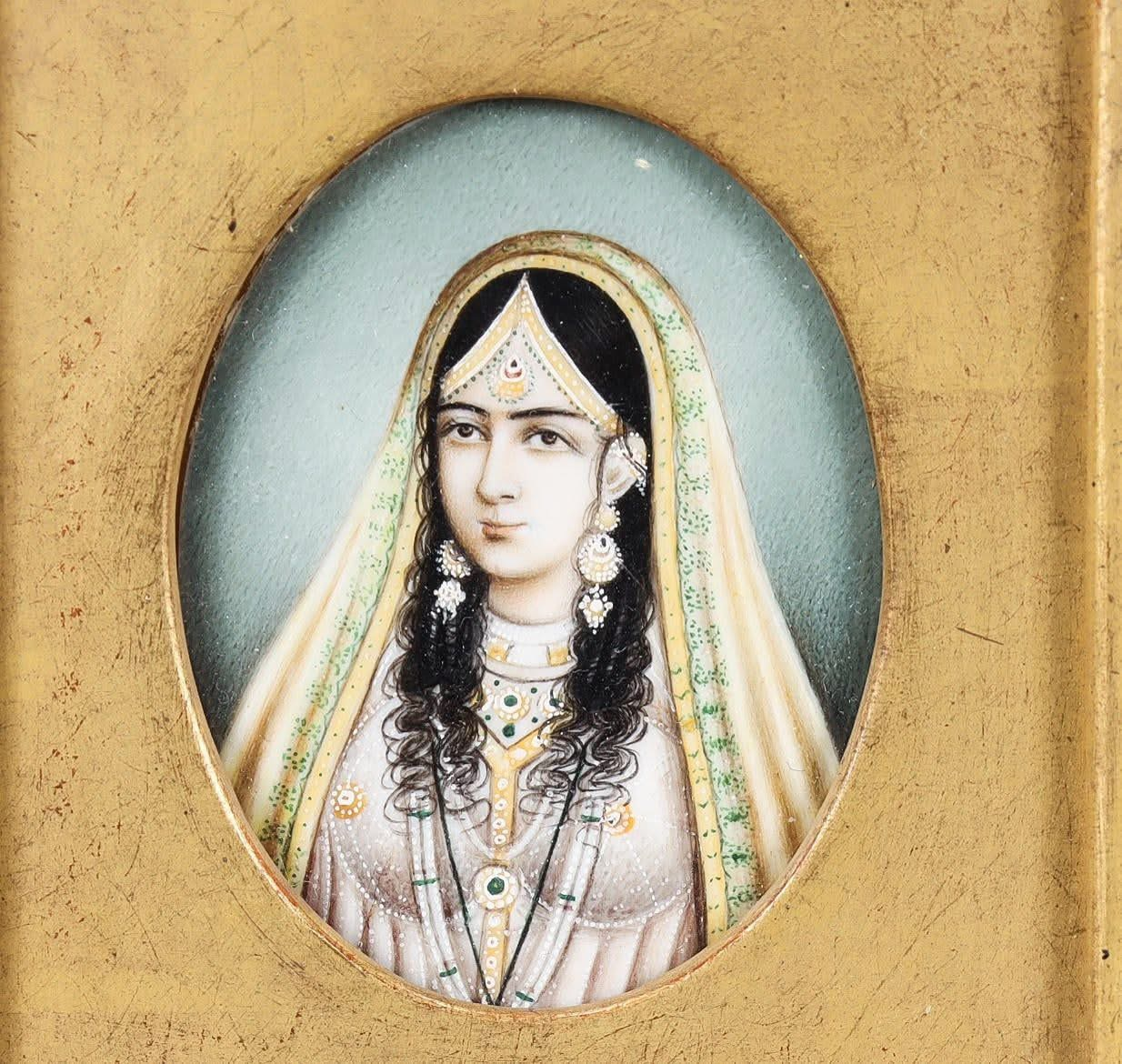
Qamar Jan Momand of Lalpura

Qamar Jan (also 'Mussamat Qamar Jan) (fl. 1879), was an Afghan royal consort, wife of Emir Sher Ali Khan (r. 1863–1879).

== Life ==
Originally from the district of Lal Pur in Afghanistan, she was a member of the Momand tribe. Her father, Saadat Khan Momand of Lalpura, was chief of the Momand and Khalil tribes on the eastern frontier..

She was one of the many wives of the king. It was the custom of the monarch to have four official wives and a large number of unofficial wives as well as slave concubines in the harem of the royal Palace complex in Kabul. Ayesha, however, was known to be Sher Ali Khan's favorite wife, and it was said that he loved her 'more than matrimony'. Sher Ali had provided her with 500 Kabuli rupees a month as allowance.

Ayesha was known for her great influence over her spouse, and has been referred to as the perhaps most politically influential royal wife in Afghanistan royal history prior to Soraya Tarzi. It was known that she had influence not only over the affairs of the royal harem and court but over the appointments of political offices as well, and it was said that after the selection or nomination of a successor, Afghanistan's first cabinet was formed in her presence inside the harem.

She is the mother of Sardar Ayub Khan and Yaqoob Khan
