= Haji Ghalib =

Afghan Guantanamo Bay detainee

Ghalib
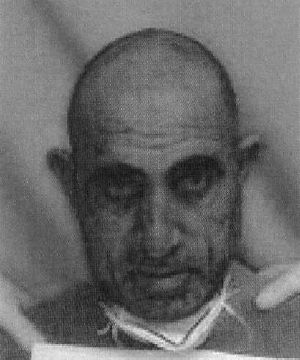
- Glalib's official Guantanamo identity photo
- Born: 1963 (age 62–63); Nangarhar Province
- Citizenship: Afghanistan
- Detained at: Guantanamo
- ISN: 987
- Charge(s): no charge, extrajudicial detention

Haji Ghalib is a citizen of Afghanistan who was held in extrajudicial detention in the United States Guantanamo Bay detention camps, in Cuba. His Guantanamo Internment Serial Number was 987. Guantanamo counter-terrorism analysts estimate he was born in 1963, in Nangarhar, Afghanistan. Ghalib was repatriated on February 28, 2007.

Ghalib was sent to Guantanamo following anonymous denunciations. He argued that he had been a loyal government official. When he was finally repatriated, the Afghan government reappointed him to senior security positions, where he became one of Afghanistan's most effective opponents to the central government's opponents.

== Combatant Status Review Tribunal ==
Combatant Status Review Tribunals were held in a 3 x 5 meter trailer. The captive sat with his hands and feet shackled to a bolt in the floor. Three chairs were reserved for members of the press, but only 37 of the 574 Tribunals were observed.

Initially, the Bush administration asserted that they could withhold all the protections of the Geneva Conventions to captives from the war on terror. This policy was challenged before the judicial branch. Critics argued that the US could not evade its obligation to conduct competent tribunals to determine whether or not the captives were entitled to the protections of prisoner of war status.

Subsequently, the Department of Defense instituted the Combatant Status Review Tribunals. The Tribunals, however, were not authorized to determine whether the captives were lawful combatants—rather they were merely empowered to make a recommendation as to whether the captive had previously been correctly determined to match the Bush administration's definition of an enemy combatant.

=== Summary of Evidence memo ===
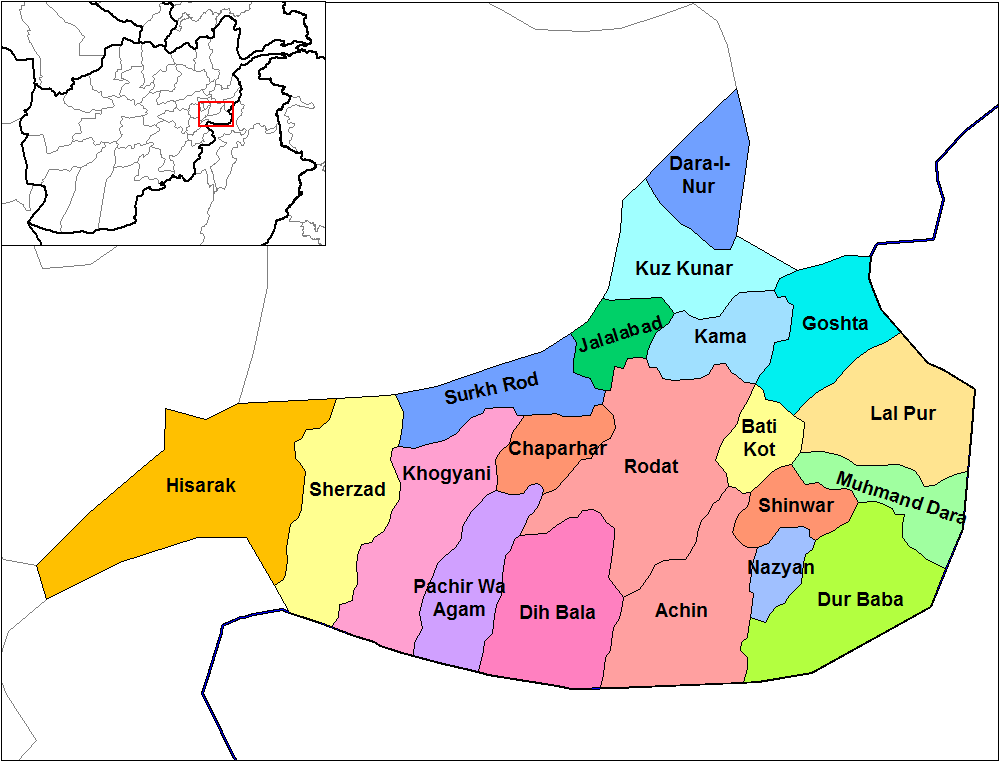
Shinwar District lies on the main road between Kabul and Pakistan near the height of the Khyber Pass.

A Summary of Evidence memo was prepared for Ghalib's Combatant Status Review Tribunal, on 1 October 2004. The memo listed the following allegations against him:

a. The detainee is a member of the Taliban.
1. Detainee was the commander of security Shinwar, Afghanistan and was in this post until his capture.
2. The Detainee was captured with a letter from the Ghunikiel Administrator, Haji Jabar, which implicated the detainee as a bomb maker.
3. United States Special Forces discovered a bomb making facility in a compound located next to the detainee's place of business. They discovered approximately 18 assorted types of explosive devices.

=== Transcript ===
Ghalib chose to participate in his Combatant Status Review Tribunal. The Department of Defense released a ten-page summarized transcript of the Tribunal on March 3, 2006.

=== Witness and document requests ===
Ghalib requested the testimony of three witnesses and some exculpatory evidence. One of his witnesses was a fellow Guantanamo detainee, Kako Kandahari. Kandahari was scheduled to testify in person. His other two witnesses were in Afghanistan, as were the documents he requested. The Tribunal's president told Ghalib the Department of Defense had requested the US State Department to request the Afghanistan Embassy in Washington to request the assistance of the Afghan Civil Service to locate the witnesses and the documents Ghalib needed.

The request to the US State Department went out on October 13, 2004, with a deadline of November 8, 2004. By November 24, 2004, the date of the Tribunal, no reply had been received, so the Tribunal's president ruled that those witnesses, and those documents, were "not reasonably available".

=== Testimony ===
Ghalib denied being a member of the Taliban. He asserted that he had been a member of the anti-Taliban resistance for eight years, fighting under Haji Abdul Cades and his brother Haji Abdul Haq. He said he was present when Abdul Haq was killed, and was very close to Abdul Cades. He asked for the testimony of Haji Bemohab Mohammed, the new Governor of Jalalabad and Haji Mohammed Sahara. He said he named these two men because he knew they were well known to American officials. He felt sure that their testimony would have established his innocence.

Ghalib told his Tribunal that he had captured many Arabs and Taliban, and turned them over to American custody. He said he had even been part of the unit that went with the Americans to destroy Osama bin Laden's house. He told his Tribunal he had much documentary and video evidence, back in Afghanistan, that would establish his innocence.

Ghalib told his Tribunal that he found the accusation that he had a letter from a Taliban leader shocking.

Ghalib told his Tribunal that, two months before his capture he had found out that a Mr. Hadrataly, a commander in Jalalabad, had written a letter falsely denouncing him to American authorities. Ghalib attributed the false denunciation to Hadrataly being from a different party jockeying for power during Afghanistan's reconstruction.

Ghalib told his Tribunal that he responded to learning about the letter by traveling to Kabul and appealing to a senior official with ties to the Americans, to explain to them that he was innocent

Upon his return he learned the Americans had inspected armories maintained by Haji Jabar, who was the District Manager. The Americans emptied those armories. Ghalib said, as part of his official duties, he too managed an Armory, a sealed Armory, that had not been inspected by the Americans. A few days after his return Americans arrested him, in his office,

== Administrative Review Board hearing ==
Detainees who were determined to have been properly classified as "enemy combatants" were scheduled to have their dossier reviewed at annual Administrative Review Board hearings. The Administrative Review Boards weren't authorized to review whether a detainee qualified for POW status, and they weren't authorized to review whether a detainee should have been classified as an "enemy combatant".

They were authorized to consider whether a detainee should continue to be detained by the United States, because they continued to pose a threat—or whether they could safely be repatriated to the custody of their home country, or whether they could be set free.

=== Summary of Evidence memo ===
A Summary of Evidence memo was prepared for Ghalib's Administrative Review Board hearing on July 25, 2005.

The following primary factors favor continued detention

a. Commitment
1. Three potentially incriminating letters are associated with the detainee.
2. Letter one alleges detainee had prior knowledge of and failed to stop production of Improvised Explosive Devices (IED's).
3. Letter one appears to have been written after the detainee's arrest because it refers to him as the "previous security commander." The detainee was the security commander until his arrest.
4. Letter two was written on Mullah Mohammed Omar's official letterhead regarding a meeting and agreement that the detainee and Malawi Ahmed Jan reached. The author is unknown.
5. Letter three was addressed to the Nangarhar intelligence department and "all Taliban members." It identifies the detainee and urges all recipients to offer as much help to him as possible.

b. Connections and Associations

Detainee identified Jan as the Taliban Minister of Mines and Industry. The detainee and others ambushed Jan and a group of Taliban, took Jan prisoner and beat him. Jan was released to the Pakistan government because it intervened.

c. Other Relevant Data
1. The detainee fought in the Russian jihad as a commander for nearly fifteen years. After the jihad, the detainee served as the Deputy of Refugee Affairs in Jalalabad.
2. During the Taliban era, the detainee fought the Taliban. The Taliban captured the detainee and held him for nearly two months.
3. The detainee was confined for a short time in his hometown until several Taliban captured the detainee and held him until he lost consciousness.
4. The Taliban released the detainee after village elders spoke on his behalf. He was exiled from Afghanistan until he lost consciousness.
5. The detainee returned to Afghanistan and fought alongside the Americans during the assault on Tora Bora.
6. After the fighting ended, the detainee was appointed as commander of security for Shinwar District. The detainee remained as the security commander until his capture.
7. Two months prior to his arrest, the detainee and the District commissioner discovered weapons stored in two locations, within and next door to the judge's office.
8. Detainee claims he notified the governor, the military head of office and the intelligence office in Jalalabad but never received a response from anyone.
9. Mid-February 2003, United States Security Forces (USSF) came to collect the weapons cache from the district governor. The detainee says he was in Kabul and did not inform the USSF of the existence of the IED's.
10. The detainee was captured on 26 February 2003 while at his security compound.
11. When informed that explosives were discovered behind the courthouse the detainee admitted he was aware of the ammunition but knew nothing of explosives. The detainee was arrested and taken to jail in Jalalabad.

The following primary factors favor release or transfer

a. The detainee characterizes two letters as forgeries. He said the letter on Mullah Omar's letterhead was written by his enemies in an attempt to destroy his reputation.

b. The detainee claims that Haji Jaba, author of letter one is a liar and does not know why he would prepare a sworn statement against him.

c. The detainee said that many HIG members in his province are causing trouble. He does not support the operations of the HIG as they preach resistance to disarmament.

d. The detainee denies having any explosive devices or planning any attacks against the Americans.

e. Even while confined, the detainee still considers himself a part of the government and is concerned with how stability could be achieved.

f. The detainee characterizes the Americans as his friends and primary reason that he was able to return to Afghanistan.

=== Transcript ===
Ghalib chose to participate in his Administrative Review Board hearing. In April 2006 the Department of Defense released a 13-page summarized transcript of the hearing.

=== Board recommendations ===
In early September 2007 the Department of Defense released two heavily redacted memos, from his Board, to Gordon England, the Designated Civilian Official. The Board's recommendation was unanimous The Board's recommendation was redacted. England authorized his transfer on 22 October 2005.

== Repatriation ==
On November 25, 2009, the Department of Defense published a list of the dates captives were transferred from Guantanamo. According to that list Ghalib Hassan was transferred on February 8, 2007. Ghalib is considered a leader in the anti-Taliban resistance under Abdul Haq. Ghalib's tribe, the Shinwari, have signed an Anti-Taliban pact.

== Return to the battlefield ==
While Ghalib's Guantanamo dossier recorded American official's fears that he would "return to the battlefield", his return was as a loyal leader on behalf of the central government.

A profile of Ghalib published on the front page of the New York Times, on November 27, 2015, noted that Joint Task Force Guantanamo authorities had feared he would return to the battlefield, if he were freed from Guantanamo. However, Joseph Goldstein pointed out that Ghalib had set aside all the bitterness triggered by the injustice and brutality of his treatment in Guantanamo, and relied on his idea of what best served his nation, and had returned to fight on behalf of Afghanistan's central government.

The article noted that he had returned to senior positions in the fight against both the Taliban, and new elements of ISIS that were being found in Afghanistan. The article noted that he now faced Abdul Rahim Muslimdost, another Guantanamo captive, who held a senior position in ISIS. The two men had been friends, in GUantanamo, where their cells had been adjacent cells. Ironically, Muslimdost was one of the 38 captives who had been cleared of suspicions of being an enemy combatant, by his 2004 Combatant Status Review Tribunal, while Ghalib was held for a further two and a half years, and was repatriated without being cleared of suspicion.

The article noted how the Taliban had assassinated many of his relatives, when he first started fighting against them. It noted that when more senior Taliban leaders noted how effective an opponent he was they reached out to Ghalib and offered to kill the more junior Taliban leaders who were responsible for order the execution of his family members, if only he would retire from fighting them—an offer Ghalib declined.

The Tribune, a newspaper published in Pakistan, compared Ghalib with another captive he made friends with, in Guantanamo – Abdul Rahim Muslim Dost. Muslim Dost also joined in the hostilities that plagued Afghanistan—but on the other side. In recent years he served as a leader of the IS forces in Afghanistan.

== See also ==
- Guantanamo Bay detention camp
