= Haska Meyna =

Town in Nangarhar Province, Afghanistan

Coordinates: 34°06′N 70°28′E

Haska Meyna هسکه مېنه
- Town
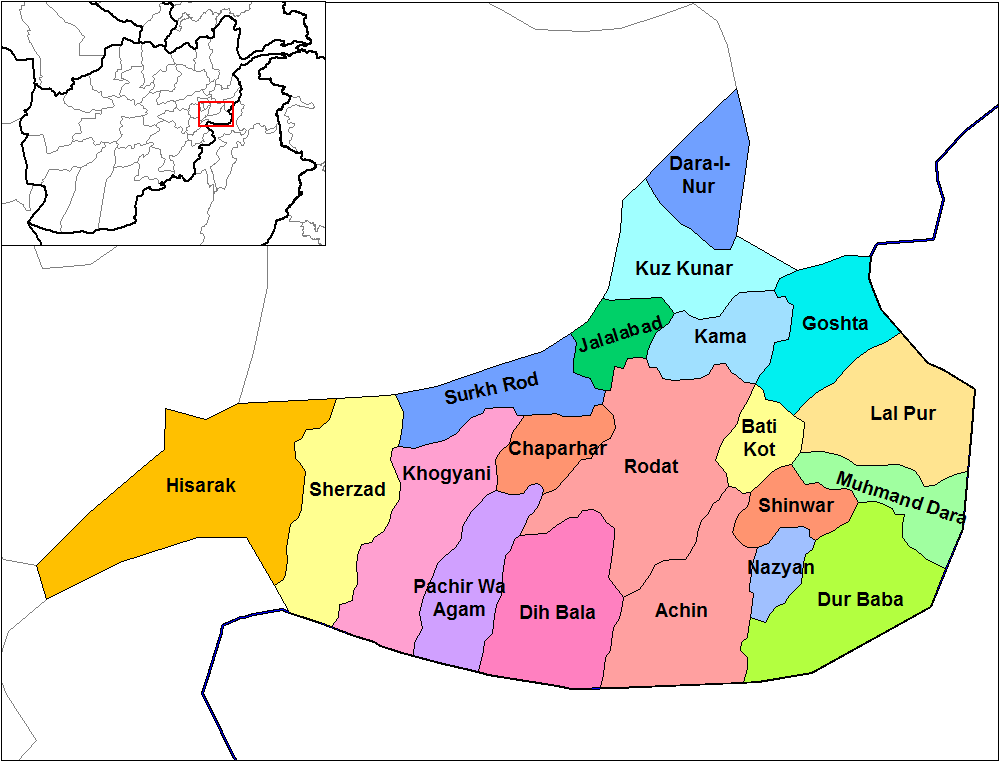
- Haska Meyna, Nangarhar Province.
- Country: Afghanistan
- Province: Nangarhar Province
- District: Haska Meyna District

Population (2002)
  - Total: 50,595
- Time zone: UTC+4:30 (Afghanistan Standard Time)

Haska Meyna (Pashto: هسکه مېنه), also called Deh Bala, is a town in Haska Meyna District in the south of Nangarhar Province, Afghanistan, bordering on Pakistan. The town is located within the heartland of the Shinwari tribe of Pashtuns.

Deh Bala is home to the Shinwari tribe, one of the largest Pashtun tribes. It was a stronghold of the Mujaheddin during the Soviet occupation of Afghanistan in the 1980s.

== Notable residents ==
Qari Barakatullah Saleem was born in the district. Deh Bala (ده بالا) is one of the villages of Haska Meyna district. Qari Barakatullah Saleem was an Afghan Quran reciter and is regarded as one of the best reciters of the Quran. He had won multiple Qira'at competitions.

== Economy ==
Agriculture is the main source of income. Crops include wheat, corn, sugar cane and rice. At times, opium poppies have been an important crop. Deh Bala's residents do not have a modern water supply system for their crops. They traditionally drain water from the mountain (Spīn Ghar), which flows along the south of the district, using water tap and shallow wells. Floods often destroy valuable fields. In the hill country, water must often be carried long distances by pack animal. Most villagers do not have access to potable water. Collecting and selling firewood, and manual labor, are other income-generating activities.

== See also ==
- Nangarhar Province
- Haska Meyna wedding party airstrike
