= Shinwari (surname) =

Shinwari is a Pashtun surname of the Shinwari tribe. Notable people with the surname include:

- Hamza Shinwari (1907–1994), poet
- Rashid khan Shinwari (1998),

Afghan Cricketer

- Rafiq Shinwari, singer
- Malalai Shinwari
- Fazal Hadi Shinwari (1927–2011), Afghan cleric
- Usman Shinwari (born 1994), Pakistani cricketer
