= Haska Meyna District =

Haska Meyna District هسکه مېنه
- District
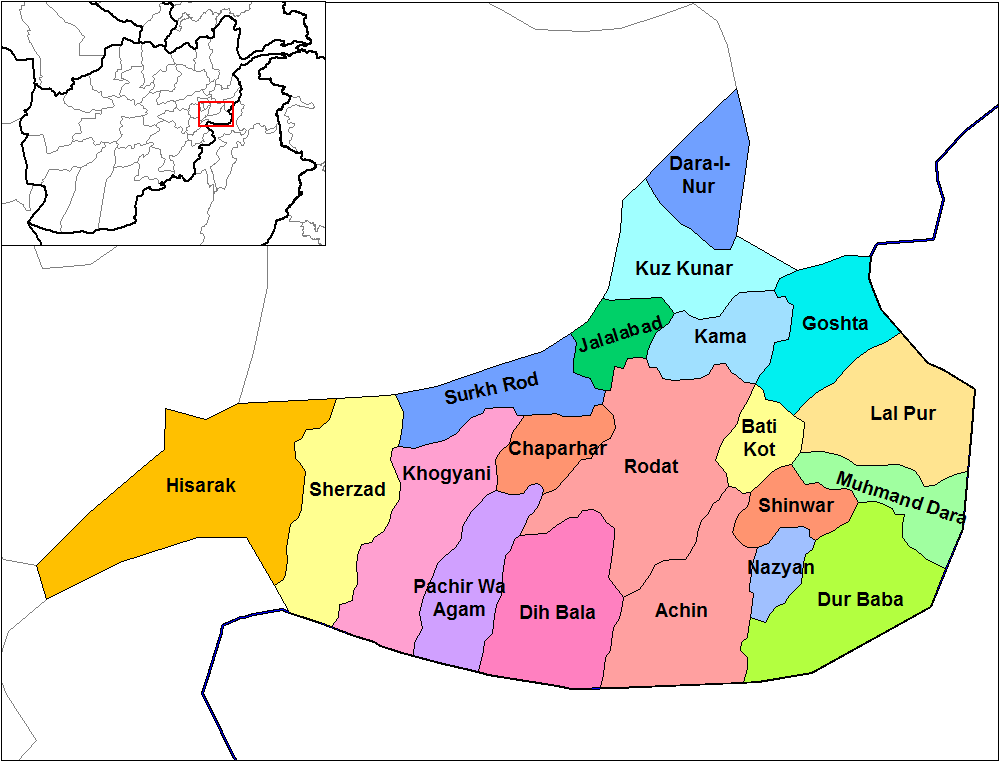
- Haska Meyna District, Nangarhar Province.
- Country: Afghanistan
- Province: Nangarhar Province
- Capital: Haska Meyna

Population (2002)
  - Total: 50,595
- Time zone: UTC+4:30 (Afghanistan Standard Time)

Haska Meyna (Pashto: هسکه مېنه), also called Deh Bala District, is a district in the south of Nangarhar Province, Afghanistan, bordering on Pakistan. Its population, which is 100% Pashtuns, was estimated at 50,595 in 2002, of whom 20,200 were children under 12. The district centre is Haska Meyna.

Haska Meyna is home to the Shinwari tribe, one of the largest Pashtun tribes. It was a stronghold of the Mujaheddin during the Soviet occupation of Afghanistan.

== See also ==
- Haska Meyna wedding party airstrike
