= Airstrikes in Libya since the beginning of the Libyan Crisis =

Airstrikes in Libya since 2011

Airstrikes in Libya
Date	January 2012 – present
Location	Libya: 2,180 airstrikes confirmed
Status	Airstrikes conducted by Libyan National Army and US

Casualties and losses
- Civilians killed: 244-379

From January 2012 to June 2018, Airwars and the New America Foundation have identified 2,180 declared and alleged airstrikes by up to eight domestic and foreign belligerents, operating within Libya. While majority of the airstrikes are conducted by US and Libyan National Army, occasionally other countries like France, Egypt and UAE have also conducted airstrikes. Hundreds of civilians have been reportedly killed in these strikes. Public sources estimate 244-379 civilian deaths in Libya.

== Airstrikes ==
=== Libyan National Army (LNA) ===
- 1365 reported strikes
- 110–173 alleged civilian fatalities.

=== United States ===
- 527 Reported Strikes
- 11–21 alleged civilian fatalities

=== Libyan Government of National Accord ===
- 90 reported strikes
- 7–9 alleged civilian fatalities

=== Libyan General National Congress ===
- 47 Reported Strikes
- 7–8 alleged civilian fatalities

=== United Arab Emirates ===
- 50 Reported Strikes
- 11–18 alleged civilian fatalities

=== Egypt ===
- 41 Reported Strikes
- 13–14 alleged civilian fatalities

=== France ===
- 5 Reported Strikes
- 4–8 alleged civilian fatalities

=== Joint/Contested ===
- 237 Reported Strikes
- 94–139 alleged civilian fatalities

=== Unknown ===
- 209 Reported Strikes
- 16–24 alleged civilian fatalities

== See also ==
- List of drone strikes in Yemen
- American airstrikes in Somalia
- List of drone strikes in Pakistan
- List of drone strikes in Afghanistan
