= Dur Baba District =

- District
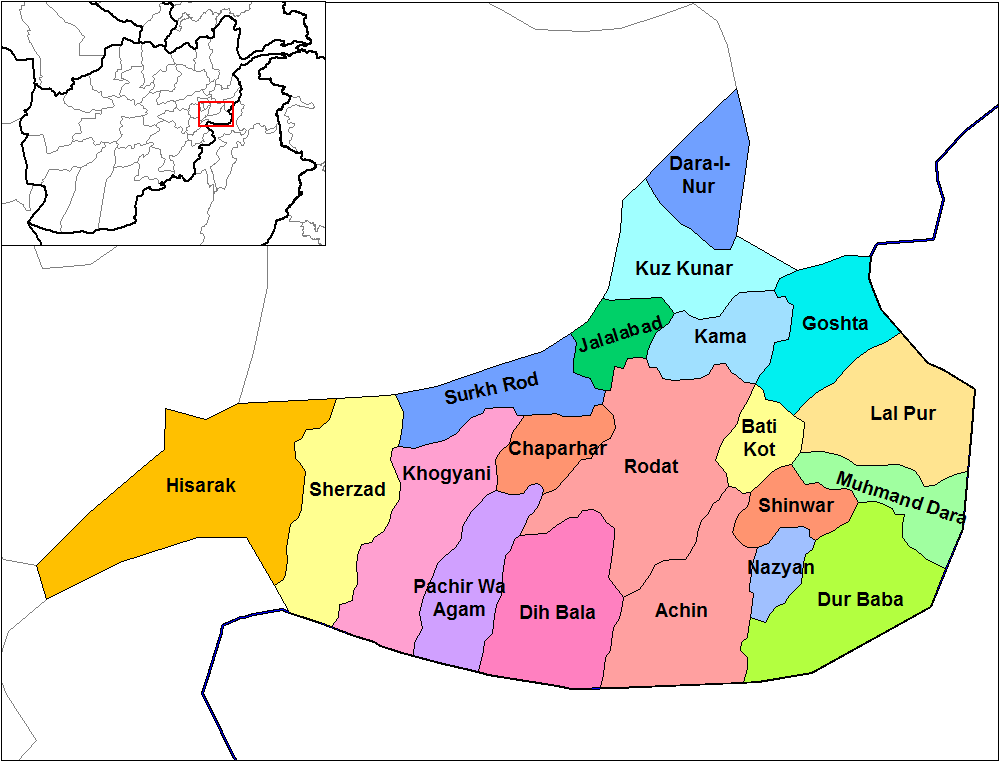
- Dur Baba District, Nangarhar Province.
- Country: Afghanistan
- Province: Nangarhar Province
- Capital: Dur Baba

Population (2002)
  - Total: 29,197
- Time zone: UTC+4:30 (Afghanistan Standard Time)

Dur Baba (Pashto: دور بابا) is a district in the southeast of Nangarhar Province, Afghanistan, bordering Pakistan. The district centre is the village of Dur Baba. The population was 29,197 in 2002. The district is within the heartland of the Shinwari tribe of Pashtuns.
