= Kasi (Pashtun tribe) =

Sarbani sub-tribe found in South, Central and West Asia

Kasi (Pashto: کاسي) or Kansi is a Pashtun tribe. The tribe is divided into various groups, notably Malak and Arbab, but these divisions are not based on blood relations or a hierarchy of rank. The Malaks used to be landowners, whereas the Arbabs were and currently are the Nawab family, meaning they took care of the administrative duties of the tribe. Furthermore, they are divided blood wise in different groups such as Mirzai, Achozai, Badazai, Khuwajazai etc.

Prominent figures from the Kasi tribe have played significant roles in politics. Malak Wazir Muhammad Kasi was the ruler of Quetta, holding a powerful position at the time. The Kasi tribe's political influence extended further when Arbab Karam Khan Kasi, a prominent figure from the tribe, became the Prime Minister of Kalat and Balochistan, especially after the Kasi tribe allied with the ruling family of Kalat.

In modern times, the Kasi tribe has remained influential in Balochistan and Pakistan's political landscape. Figures such as Sadiq Shaheed Kasi and Abdul Khalid Kasi have been deeply involved in political movements and had many sacrifices for the sake of their people welfare. Their involvement in the Awami National Party and Khudae-Madadgar group and other political parties demonstrates the tribe's continued prominence in Balochistan's political and social spheres. The Kasi people are also recognized for their educational advancements, making them one of the most educated and respected tribes in the region.

== History ==
Kasi is a tribe of Pashtuns which is primarily concentrated in and around Quetta city. They belong to the Saraban division of Pashtuns. It is numerically a very small tribe, they only numbered 1064 souls in 1901 AD.

The Kasi tribe is divided into eight sections, namely, Khawajzai, Khetrans, Achozai, Gadazai, Ahmad Khanzai, Akazai, Badazai, Zimmri, Shinwari, and Spingull.

According to Ain-i-Akbari of Abu Fazal (written around 1590 AD), Shal & Mastung was dependency of Kandahar in later half of sixteenth century. Shal had mud fort at that time and its lands were assessed at four and half tumans in money, 940 sheep and 780 kharwars in grain. The Kasi Afghans and Baluchs of Shal- Mastung had to furnish 1,000 horse and 1,000 foot.

In the reign of Shahjahan (1628–1655) Rajo and Zangi, Rind chiefs raided Shal by way of the Bolan. They were defeated by the Kasis after a severe engagement about three miles south of Quetta. Since then the small stream of Zangi Lora was given its name, as the action took place at its source when Zangi, the Rind chief, was killed.

The leading families of Kasis are known as Arbabs. In 18th century Ahmad Shah Abdali conferred the office of Arbab upon Muhammad Thalib Kasi. Mir Mahabat Khan (ruler of Kalat) killed him when he was at village Katir. The Kasi Arbab was engaged in collecting the revenue at the time and was quite unprepared for the attack. News of the occurrence immediately was despatched to Kandahar, and Ahmed Shah Durrani summoned Mahabat Khan to Kandahar to explain how he came to slay the Shah's representative in Shal.

== Notable people ==
- Mir Aimal Kansi, Pashtun national who shot and killed two employees of the U.S. Central Intelligence Agency (CIA) as they were waiting in their cars to enter the agency's vast complex as a revenge killing for CIA politics in Afghanistan

== Sources ==
- Pata Khazana (in Persian language) - Archived
- Willem Vogelsang (2002). The Afghans. Wiley-Blackwell. ISBN 978-0-631-19841-3.
- Nagendra Kr Singh (1 September 2002). International encyclopaedia of Islamic dynasties. Anmol Publications PVT. LTD. ISBN 978-81-261-0403-1.
- Kamma, Freerk C.; Kooijman, Simon (1973). Romawa Forja: Child of the Fire. Brill Archive. pp. 35–36.
