= Chaparhar District =

Chaparhar District چپرهار
- District
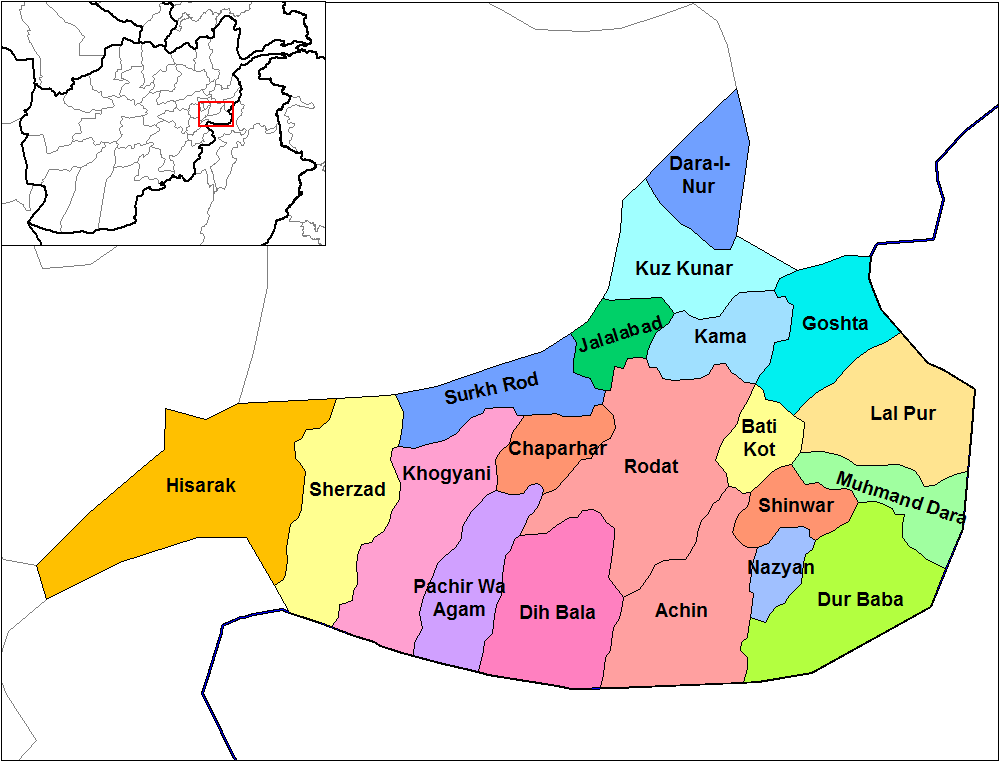
- Chaparhar District, Nangarhar Province

- Location in Afghanistan
- Coordinates: 34°19′20″N 70°23′07″E
- Country: Afghanistan
- Province: Nangarhar Province
- District centre: Chaparhar

Population (2002)
  - Total: 54,858
- Time zone: UTC+4:30 (Afghanistan Standard Time)

Chaparhar (Pashto: چپرهار) is a district in the centre of Nangarhar Province, Afghanistan. Its population, which is 100% Pashtun, was estimated at 54,858 in 2002, of whom 21,800 were children under 12. The district is within the heartland of the Shinwari tribe of Pashtuns, but there are many other tribes there as well, the most prominent of which are Daulatzai and Taraki. The district centre is the village of Chaparhar.
