= Majrah District =

Marjah District Pashto: مارجه ولسوالۍ
- Districts
- Location in Afghanistan
- Coordinates: 31°52′N 64°12′E
- Country: Afghanistan
- Province: Helmand
- Capital: Marjah
- Founding: 2010

Area
  - Total: 2,904 km^{2} (1,121 sq mi)
- Elevation: 777 m (2,549 ft)

Population (2020)
  - Total: 30,425
  - Density: 10.48/km^{2} (27.14/sq mi)

Time zone
- Time in Afghanistan: UTC+04:30

Marjah District ( Pashto: مارجه ولسوالۍ) is a district in Helmand Province, Afghanistan.
