= Shinwari District =

Shinwari شینواری
- District
- Location in Afghanistan
- Coordinates: 35.1158°N 69.0732°E
- Country: Afghanistan
- Province: Parwan

Population
  - Religions: Islam
- Time zone: + 4.30

Shinwari District (Pashto: شينواري) is a district of Parwan province, Afghanistan.

== Demographics ==
The district is mostly populated by the Shinwari tribe of Pashtuns. The estimated population in 2019 was 45,699.

== See also ==
- Districts of Afghanistan
