= Nazyan District =

District of Nangarhar, Afghanistan

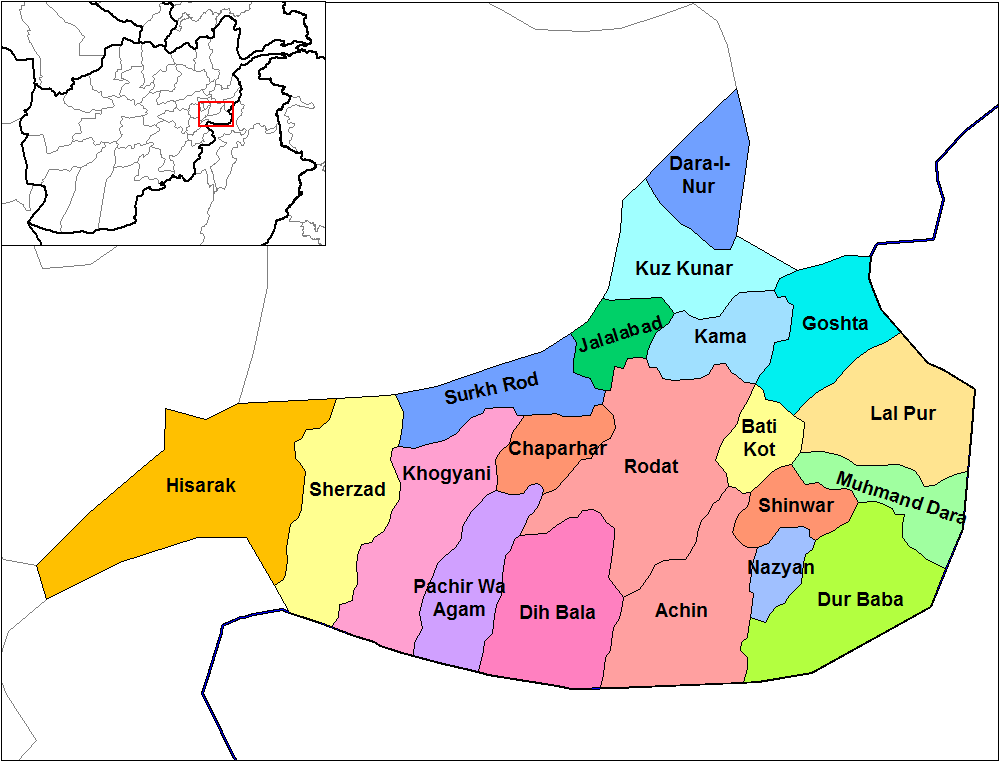
Nangarhar districts.

Nazyan (Pashto: نازيان) is a district in the south-east of Nangarhar Province, Afghanistan. Its population, which is 100% Pashtun, was estimated at 22,858 in 2002, of whom 9,000 were children under 12. The district is within the heartland of the Shinwari tribe of Pashtuns. The district centre is a village called Surubai.
