= Lal Pur District =

District of Nangarhar, Afghanistan

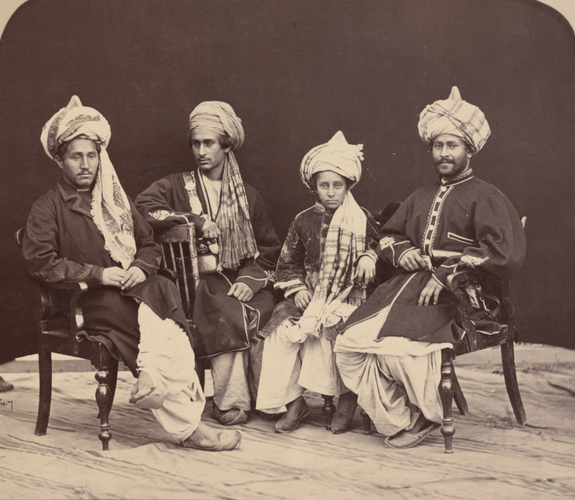
"Four sons of Nawrūz Khan of Lalpoora", photograph by John Burke, 1878

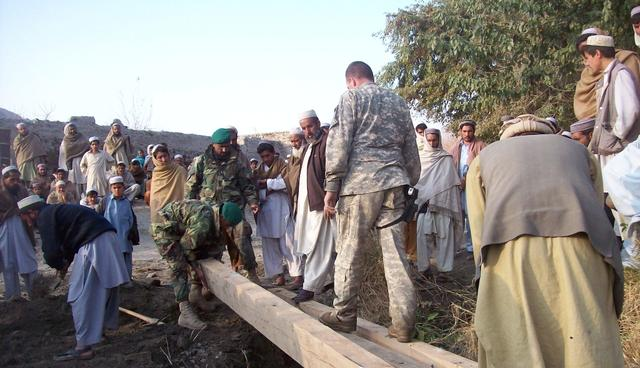
Bridge building in Lal Pur District

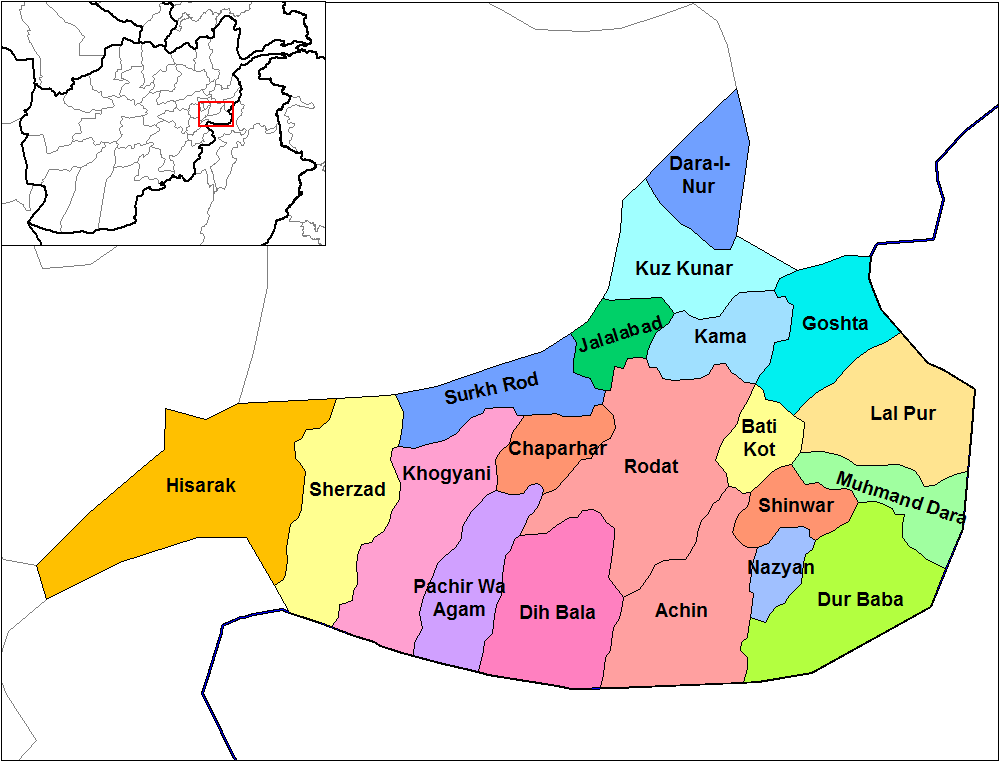
Nangarhar districts

Lal Pur (Pashto: لالپور) is a district in eastern Nangarhar Province, Afghanistan, bordering Pakistan. The population is primarily Pashtun and estimated to be 34,516 in 2002 (including 13,800 children under 12). The district center is the village of Lal Pur.

Lal Pur is home to many Afghan statesmen of the past century. The Khan of Lalpur Momands, is a well-known family from Lal Pur. Khan Kor, which translates to Royal Family of Khan, are among the most powerful Mohmand's. The Khan was regarded as the King of Mohmand by many famous Afghans such as Amir Sher Ali Khan. The Khan had control over all the Mohmand’s and continues to have influence over Lal Pur.

Lal Pur was a famous trade route. The Khan would collect taxes from the traders. Lal Pur was considered to be a kingdom.

Saadat Khan Mohmand of Lal Pur was the father-in-law of Amir Sher Ali Khan and was the grandfather of both Mohammad Yaqub Khan and Ayub Khan (Emir of Afghanistan), also known as "The Victor of Maiwand" or "The Afghan Prince Charlie".

The Khan of Lalpur rule was from Lal Pur, Afghanistan to Peshawar, Pakistan. The Marchakhel was the chief of Mohmand’s which had held influence throughout Mohmand tribes, excluding the Safi Momand’s which were under the influence of Khan of Bajaur. The Marchakhel family, a sub-tribe of the Tarak Zai Mohmands (Dado Khel), is a well-known family from Lal Pur. People of the Murchakhel clan mostly reside in Pakistan.
