= Bati Kot District =

Bati Kot District Pashto: بټي کوټ ولسوالۍ
- District
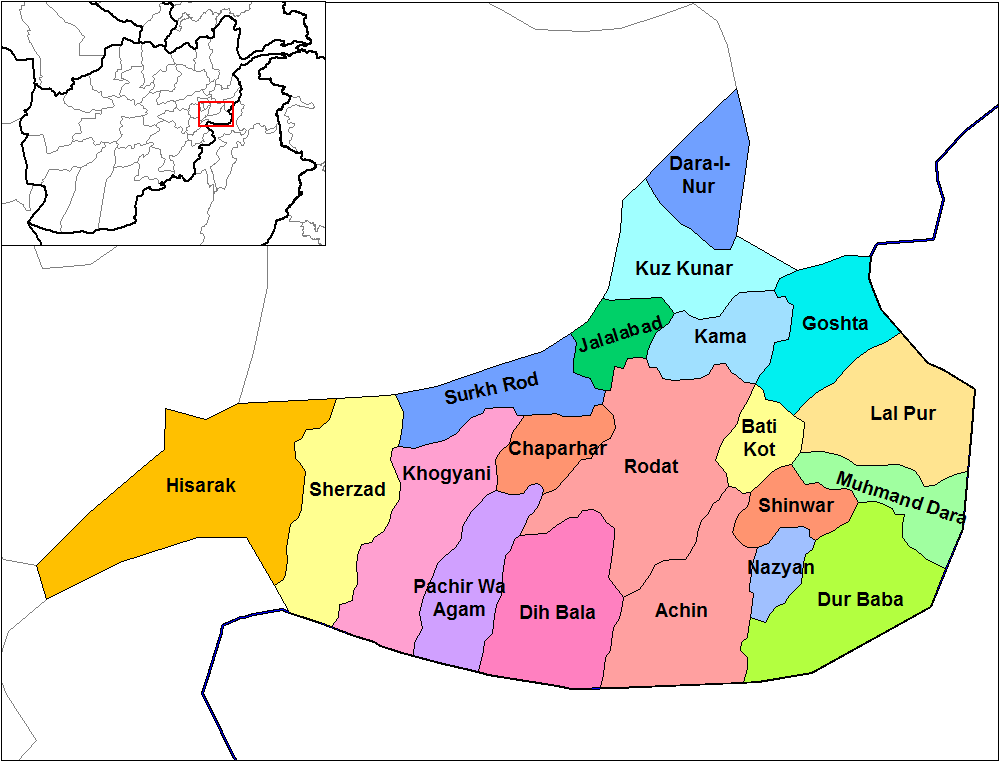
- Bati Kot District, Nangarhar Province.
- Country: Afghanistan
- Province: Nangarhar Province
- Capital: Hafeez Kodai

Population (2017)
  - Total: 300,000 (Three lack)
- Time zone: UTC+4:30 (Afghanistan Standard Time)

Bati Kot District (Pashto: بټي کوټ ولسوالۍ) is a district in the east of Nangarhar Province, Afghanistan. Its population, which is 100% Pashtun, was estimated at 300,000 in 2017, of whom 25,500 were children under 12. The district is within the heartland of the Mohmand tribe of Pashtuns. The district centre is Nader Shah Kot.

Batikot has the following villages: Sepay, Lowartay, Sarobi, Ghaze Abad, Chardi, Khanano Kali(gary), Takya, Grabawa, Barekab, Meshwane, Lachapor, Gundyane, Kody, and Ambarkhana. Since the 2nd presidential term of Hamid Karzia, about 70% area of Bati Kot is covered by Taliban. The main centre of Taliban is in Salour Kali.
