= Kot District =

Kot District کوت
- District
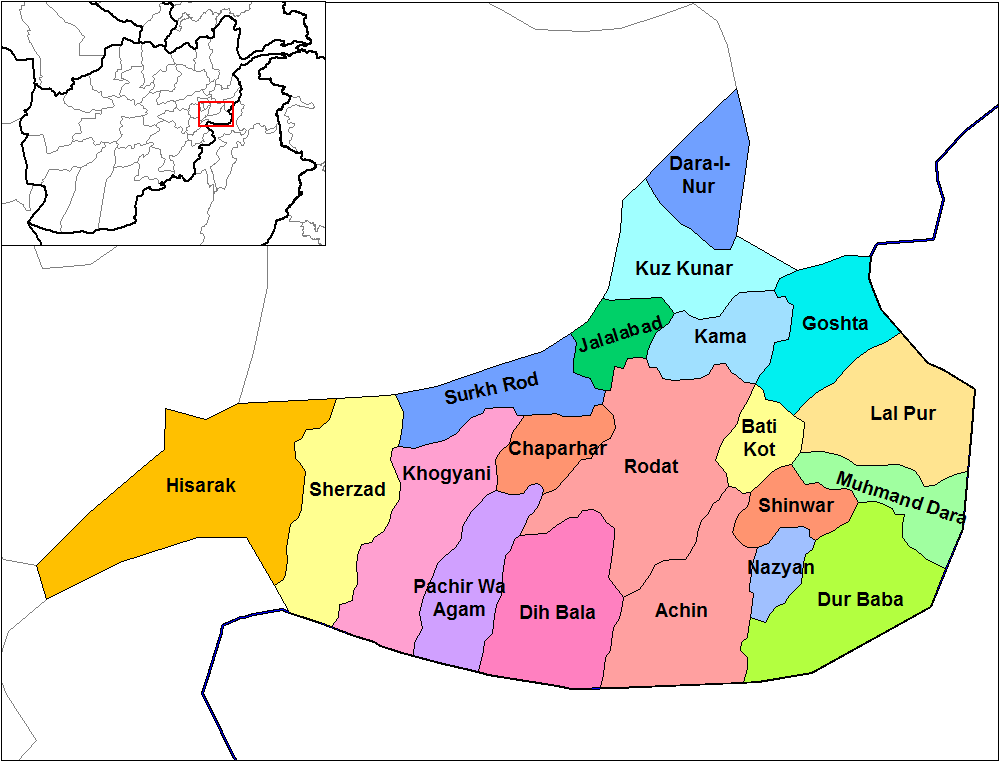
- Kot District is located in the north-west of Nangarhar Province.
- Country: Afghanistan
- Province: Nangarhar Province
- Capital: Jalalabad

Population (2006)
  - Total: 205,423
- Time zone: UTC+4:30 (D† (Afghanistan Standard Time))

Kot (Pashto: کوټ) is a district in the northern Nangarhar Province of Afghanistan.

From 2015 into the first half of 2016, ISIS's presence in the district mounted to clashes against the Afghan forces. Afghan troops launched an offensive in July 2016 against the group which led to their being pushed out of the district and training camps being destroyed by Afghan forces.
