= Shinwar District =

District of Nangarhar, Afghanistan

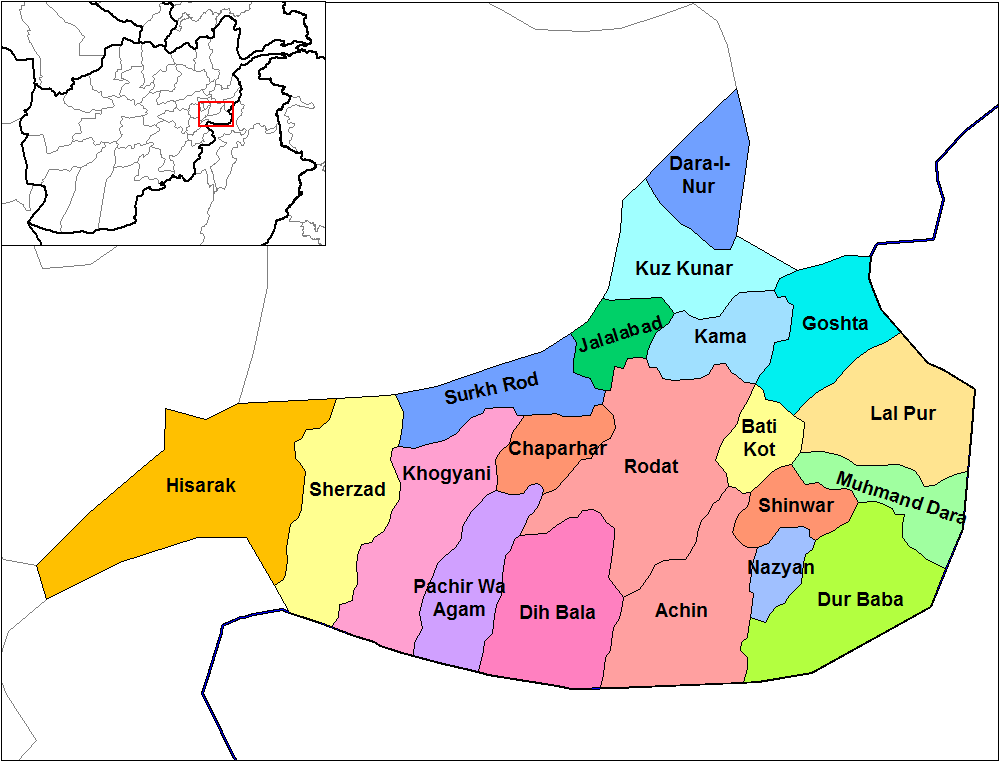
Map of districts in Nangarhar province, Shinwar is located on the bottom right

Shinwar (Pashto: شینوار) is a district in Nangarhar Province, Afghanistan. It is on the main highway from Jalalabad to the Torkham border crossing. Its population, which is 100% Pashtun was estimated at 40,147 in 2002, of whom 16,000 were children under 12. The district centre is the village of Shinwar.
