= List of populated places in Afghanistan =

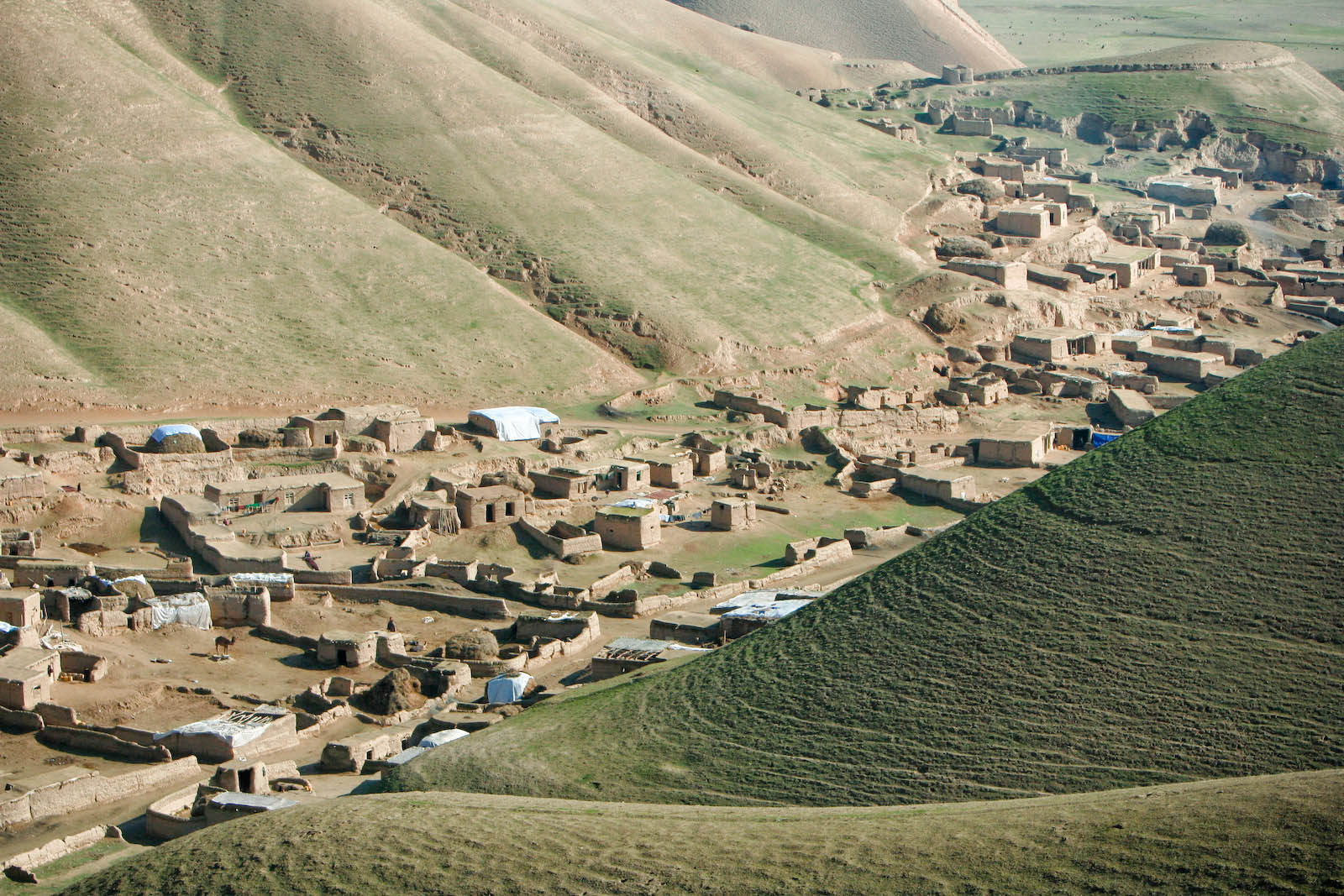
Village in Faryab Province, 2009

This is an alphabetical list of populated places in Afghanistan, including hamlets, villages, towns, and other small or rural communities. For urban areas and cities, and other densely populated places, see list of cities in Afghanistan. Provinces and districts are listed at their respective articles.

== A ==
- Ab Bala
- Āb Band
- Ab Barik
- Ab Gaj
- Ab Khvor
- Ab Khuda'i
- Ab Kolok
- Ab Mazar
- Ab-e Barik-e Qowdi
- Ab-Kol
- `Abbas Koshteh
- Abdan-e Shebaqli
- Abi Jan
- Abshar
- Abtu
- Adineh Masjed
- Ahangaran
- Ajar
- Jehrik Pashtun
- Ajrim
- Ak Bolak
- Ak Toba
- Akhshay
- Akhjar
- `Ali Gol
- 'Aliabad
- Alikhel
- Alim Dara
- Almaytū
- `Ambar Samuch
- Amrakh
- Amrud
- Amurn
- Andkhoy
- Andowj
- Anguri
- Anjuman
- Anjuman-i-Khurd
- Anvah-ye Kalan
- Ao Barik
- Aodan
- Aq Gonbaz
- Aq Robat
- Aqcha
- Aqina
- Arakht
- Aranji
- Araq-e `Olya
- Arigh Batur
- Arg-e Zari
- Arghandakan
- Artin Jelow
- Asgharat
- Ashkasham
- Ashnam
- Asqalan
- Av Darreh
- Av Par
- Aybak, Helmand
- Aybak, Samangan
- Azad
- Azan
- Azaw

Top of page

== B ==
- Ba Khersak
- Babula'i
- Bagag
- Bagh-e Bala
- Baghala
- Bagram
- Bahador Khani
- Baharestan
- Bakharow
- Bala Bowkan
- Bala Deh
- Bala Duri-ye Avval
- Bala Duri-ye Dovvom
- Bala Kuh
- Baladay
- Balkh
- Baluchi, Balkh
- Balūchī, Helmand
- Balūchī, Herat
- Balūchī, Orūzgān
- Balūchī, Sar-e Pol
- Banaq
- Band-e Sheram
- Band-e Shuy
- Banow
- Baraki
- Baraqi
- Barfak
- Barigah
- Barik Juy
- Barik-e `Olya
- Barik-e Sofla
- Barikak
- Barkah
- Bariki
- Baryavan
- Basenj
- Bashanabad
- Bast
- Bastukbacheh
- Batob
- Bauragai
- Bawragai
- Bawrchi
- Bawshi
- Bay Malasi
- Bay Saqal
- Bay Temor
- Baya
- Bayanan
- Bayani
- Baybacheh
- Baybul
- Bayram
- Bayri
- Baza'i Gonbad
- Bazar-e Taleh
- Bazartu
- Bazgir
- Bekhe Qada
- Berana
- Beygshahr
- Birimak
- Bia Mordeh
- Bid Qowl Bala
- Bid-e Kalan
- Bid-i Khvah
- Bidak
- Bidqowl
- Binisang
- Biraneh
- Bolagh Tughaneh
- Bolagh-e Sabz
- Boland Dival
- Bolowleh
- Boria Bal
- Bowz Arigh
- Boz Darreh
- Bozba'i
- Bum
- Bum-e Shebar

Top of page

== C ==
- Cawgay
- Chahar Dar
- Chahar Kent
- Chahar Mahalleh
- Chahi
- Chakaran
- Chakari
- Chakav
- Chalas
- Cham Qal`eh
- Chaman-e Bid
- Chapchal
- Char Bagh
- Char Bulak
- Char Kateh
- Chap Qowlak
- Char-e-Anjir
- Chasnud-e 'Olya
- Chehel Gazi
- Chehel Tan
- Chemtal
- Chenaran
- Cheshmeh-ye Duzakh
- Cheshmeh-ye Shafa
- Cheshmeh-ye Shir
- Cheshmeh-ye Yanbolaq
- Chosnukel
- Chub Bash

Top of page

== D ==
- Dahan-e Av Par
- Dahan-e Baghdarreh
- Dahan-e Chahar Deh
- Dahan-e Darreh Chasht
- Dahan-e Dival
- Dahan-e Do Laneh
- Dahan-e Eshposhteh
- Dahan-e Fatu
- Dahan-e Jow Palal
- Dahan-e Jowkak
- Dahan-e Kanak
- Dahan-e Karkareh
- Dahan-e Khawal
- Dahan-e Khoshkak
- Dahan-e Koklan
- Dahan-e Mad
- Dahan-e Shibar
- Dahan-e Siahqowl
- Dahan-e Valian
- Dahaneh
- Dahaneh-ye Ghowri
- Dailanor
- Daki
- Dalak
- Dali
- Dara
- Darabad
- Darghani
- Darmadar
- Darmarakh
- Darreh Javay
- Darreh-ye Altamur
- Darreh-ye Awd
- Darreh-ye Bum
- Darreh-ye Darvazeh
- Darreh-ye Jalmesh
- Darreh-ye Joval
- Darreh-ye Jow Qowl
- Darreh-ye Kajak
- Darreh-ye Navora
- Darreh-ye Pay Nav
- Darreh-ye Pishkan
- Darreh-ye Shu
- Darreh-ye Suf
- Darvishan
- Dasht Qal`eh
- Dasht-e Borsoneh
- Dasht-e Margo
- Dasht-e Sachak
- Dasht-e Sefid
- Dashtak
- De Loy Wiyaleh Kelay
- De Mulla Samandar Sahib Kelay
- Deh Bala
- Deh Berenj Qal`eh
- Deh Deraz
- Deh Gholaman
- Deh Hezareh
- Deh Now
- Deh Sorkh
- Deh-e Salah
- Dehdadi
- Dehestan
- Delak
- Delek
- Dewlak
- Derunta training camp
- Div Khaneh
- Div Khaneh-ye Bala
- Div Khaneh-ye Pa'in
- Dival
- Divalak-e `Olya
- Dīvāneh
- Do Ab
- Do Ab-e Mikh-e Zarrin
- Do Abi
- Do Ru
- Do Shakh
- Dogor Gunt
- Dugh Ghalat
- Dughabad
- Dogor Gunt
- Dokani
- Dowshi
- Dow Ab
- Dowlatabad, Balkh
- Dowra'id
- Dudgah
- Duraj
- Durman
- Dushi

Top of page

== E ==
- Eg
- Elasayel
- Emam Sahib
- Erganah
- Eshkashem
- Eshmorgh
- Eskan
- Eskar
- Eskatul
- Eslām Chūngar
- Espandi 'Olya

Top of page

== F ==
- Faqiran
- Far Ghambowl
- Farghamiru
- Farghamu
- Fatmasti
- Folowl-e Bala
- Folowl-e Pa'in
- Fotur

Top of page

== G ==
- Galleh Chaghar
- Gardan Deh
- Gardan Kichah
- Garm Bolagh
- Gawaki
- Gaz Khan
- Gelak
- Gerd Deh
- Ghandak
- Ghar Javin
- Gharbi
- Ghargharreh
- Gharji
- Gharmeh
- Ghonvar
- Ghorak
- Ghormach
- Ghowch
- Ghowch Naveh
- Ghowchak
- Ghowjurak
- Ghowrayd Gharami
- Ghuch Zamin
- Ghulam Nabi Kelay
- Ghumay
- Girdi Kas
- Girishk
- Giru Qowl
- Godri
- Golkhaneh
- Golzar Kalay
- Gonbad
- Gonbad-e Pa'in
- Gow Darreh
- Gowri Sukhteh
- Gowritik
- Gowshak
- Gulbahar
- Gur-e Mar
- Gustaw

Top of page

== H ==
- Hasan Khēl
- Hasan Tal
- Hazar Cheshmeh
- Hazareh Toghay
- Hazrat-e Sa`id
- Hesar
- Hesarak
- Heydarabad
- Hojm-e Bala
- Hojm-e Pa'in
- Howz-e Shah-e Bala
- Howz-e Shah-e Pa'in

Top of page

== I ==
- Ilakah
- Ilbak
- Imam Rabat
- Imam Sahib
- Ingishkah
- Ir Bolagh
- Isari
- Iskar
- Islam Pinjah
- Islam Qala
- Islam Towarabaf
- Ispin Kai
- Istoway
- Istowi

Top of page

== J ==
- Jamarj-e Bala
- Jandar Gol-e `Olya
- Jandar Gol-e Sofla
- Jang `Ali
- Jang Righ
- Jarf
- Javqol
- Jawand
- Jermatu
- Jim Qal`eh
- Jowkar
- Jowlan
- Jowzari
- Jorm
- Jow Kham
- Jow Palal
- Jow Qowl
- Juy Vakil
- Juy-ye `Arab
- Juy-ye Shadi

Top of page

== K ==
- Ka Chona
- Kadalak
- Kadanak
- Kafsh Andaz
- Kahmard
- Kaj Ab
- Kakan
- Kal Qal'ah
- Kalakan
- Kalan Eylgah
- Kalat
- Kalokh
- Kam Piri
- Kamar
- Kamarak
- Kamati
- Kandeh Sang
- Kangur, Afghanistan
- Kangurchi
- Kar-Mulla
- Kariz-e Zaman-e Bala
- Kariz-e Zaman-e Kalgandi
- Kariz-e Zaman-e Pa'in
- Karkat
- Kashkandyow
- Katah Khak
- Katok
- Katway
- Kawida
- Kayan
- Keligan
- Keshem
- Keshendeh-ye Bala
- Keshendeh-ye Pa'in
- Khair Khāna
- Khak Dow
- Khak-e Babeh
- Khak-e Cheghel
- Khal Khan
- Khalamad
- Kham-e Ganak
- Khan Abad
- Khandud
- Khaneh-ye Garmatek
- Khaneqa
- Khaneqah
- Khar Bid
- Khar Kat-e Bala
- Khar Mordeh-ye Pa'in
- Khar Qowl
- Kharat
- Khayrabad
- Khash Darreh
- Khashpak
- Khaval
- Khazget
- Khenjan
- Khevaj
- Kheyr Khaneh
- Kheyrabad, Badakhshan
- Kheyrabad, Balkh
- Khinjan
- Kholm
- Khombok
- Khoshk Darreh
- Khoshk Qowl
- Khoshkak
- Khughaz
- Khuk-e Koshteh
- Khvajeh Owlia'
- Khvajeh Hasan
- Khvajeh Jeyran
- Khvajeh Kowshah
- Khvajeh Owlia'
- Khvajeh Qalandar
- Khvolah
- Khvosh Asia
- Khvosh Margh
- Khwahan
- Kil Bastalah
- Kogel Say
- Koshk-e Kohneh
- Kowarzan
- Kowkcha'il
- Kowlian
- Kowri
- Kowtkay
- Kucheh-ye Zard
- Kuh Gaday
- Kulan
- Kuran wa Munjan
- Kushgag
- Kushk
- Kushka
- Kushkak

Top of page

== L ==
- Ladu
- Laghar Juy
- Lagharak
- Lala Kheyl
- Lalma
- Landay
- Langar, Badakhshan
- Langar, Bamyan
- Langar Khaneh-ye Kalan
- Lar-e Gari
- Laron
- Larow

Top of page

== M ==
- Ma`dan-e Karkar
- Madraseh
- Madud
- Magh Nawul
- Mah-e Now
- Mahajer
- Mahmud-i-Raqi
- Malek Military Center
- Malestan
- Mangan
- Mashhad
- Mashorey
- Maymey
- Mazar
- Meymik
- Meydan
- Mian Deh
- Mina Do
- Mina Vad
- Mir Qasem
- Miranza'i
- Mirkan
- Mirza Olang
- Mizak
- Munji, Afghanistan
- Muqur
- Murichaq
- Musa Qala

Top of page

== N ==
- Na`man
- Nahr-e Shahi
- Nahrin District
- Nakhjirabad
- Nangalam
- Nani
- Nav
- Navarid Qipchaq
- Nawa
- Nawzad
- Nechkah
- Nesharv
- Nilan
- Nim Lik
- North Salang
- Now Abad
- Nowabad-e Ish
- Nusay

Top of page

== O ==
- Onab
- Onay
- Orgun
- Owghlan
- Owtah Kol

Top of page

== P ==
- Pa'in Bowkan
- Pa'in Shahr
- Padeh-ye Laghari
- Padeh-ye Nowkdari
- Pahlavan Tash
- Pajwar
- Pak
- Panam
- Panjab
- Park
- Parvareh
- Pas-e Pashar
- Pashmi Qal`eh
- Patukh
- Peshi Puza
- Peykam Darreh
- Pitab
- Pitav
- Powkowy

Top of page

== Q ==
- Qades
- Qal`eh-ye Mirza Shah
- Qal`eh-ye Bar Panj
- Qal`eh-ye Vali
- Qal`eh-ye Nowak
- Qal`eh-ye Panjeh
- Qala i Naw
- Qala Wust
- Qalacha
- Qandahari
- Qarah Tappeh
- Qarchi Gak
- Qawme Dehqan
- Qazan, Balkh
- Qazi Deh
- Qeshlaq Khas
- Qeshnehabad
- Qezel Kand, Afghanistan
- Qila Niazi
- Qowl Taq
- Qowland
- Qurchi

Top of page

== R ==
- Ragh
- Ravenj
- Regay
- Robat-e Payan
- Rokowt
- Rom
- Rowchun

Top of page

== S ==
- Sabzi Bahar
- Sakhari
- Sandal
- Sang Ab
- Sangar
- Sangbor
- Sangborran
- Sanglich
- Sar Ab
- Sar Shakh
- Sargez
- Sar-i Sang
- Sarhadd
- Sast
- Sayyad
- Sefid Darreh
- Seh Kushk
- Sel Don
- Senjetak
- Shadian
- Shah Anjir
- Shah-e Pari
- Shahab od Din
- Shahidan
- Shahr-e Arman
- Shahr-e Bozorg
- Shahr-e Monjan
- Shahran
- Shakar Dara
- Shashan
- Shekastegan
- Shekiban
- Sher Khan Bandar
- Shighnan
- Shindand
- Shingan
- Shirabad
- Shirin Tagab District
- Shiveh
- Shkharow
- Shkhawr
- Sholoktu
- Shur Areq
- Shortepa District
- Shorshoreh
- Showrak
- Shulgareh
- Shurab
- Siah Gerd
- Siah Chub Kalay
- Skazar
- Som Darreh
- Suduj
- Surkhrud

Top of page

== T ==
- Tagab
- Tagab Robat
- Taghan Aregh
- Taghir Pata
- Takaka
- Takht-e Ghowrmach
- Takhteh Pol
- Taleh va Barfak
- Talkhian
- Tall-e Mir Ghazi
- Tandurak
- Tang
- Tani
- Tarang
- Tarnak Farms
- Tash Gozar
- Tazraq
- Temorak Navarid
- Teylan
- Teshkan
- Tojg
- Tokhom Geldi
- Torghundi
- Townj
- Tozhna-i-Nasiri
- Tupchi

Top of page

== U ==
- Uch Drag
- Umowl
- Urgand
- Urgun
- Urup
- Ushkan

Top of page

== V ==
- Vakhshak
- Vazirabad
- Vazit
- Vod Ab
- Volar

Top of page

== W ==
- Waghjan
- Wali
- Wandian
- Warg
- Watarmah-ye Pa'in
- Woring
- Wusan

Top of page

== Y ==
- Yakah Darakht
- Yakawlang
- Yakh Karez
- Yakhak
- Yakhan-e 'Ulya
- Yakhdan
- Yalur
- Yaram-e Sofla
- Yardar
- Yasich
- Yasif
- Yavarzan
- Yaka Bagh

Top of page

== Z ==
- Zadian
- Ẕāheṟ Khūnē
- Ẕāmi Kalay
- Zangerya
- Zar Khan
- Zaranj
- Zargaran
- Ziak
- Zin
- Zinjaren
- Zir-e Pol-e Juy

Top of page

== See also ==
- List of cities in Afghanistan
