= Kowlian =

- Location in Afghanistan
- Coordinates: 35°53′5″N 65°24′5″E
- Country: Afghanistan
- Province: Faryab Province
- Time zone: + 4.30

Kowlian (Also spelled as Kaolian and Kawlyan) is a village in Afghanistan. It has been the site of factional fighting. It is in Faryab Province.

== See also ==
- List of places in Afghanistan
