= Baybacheh =

- Location in Afghanistan
- Coordinates: 34°57′12″N 64°03′04″E
- Country: Afghanistan
- Province: Badghis Province
- Time zone: + 4.30

Baybacheh is a village in Badghis Province in north western Afghanistan.
