= Batob =

- Location in Afghanistan
- Coordinates: 36°13′48″N 69°09′40″E
- Country: Afghanistan
- Province: Baghlan Province
- Time zone: + 4.30

Batob is a village in Baghlan Province in north-eastern Afghanistan.

== See also ==
- Baghlan Province
