= Miranza'i =

- Location in Afghanistan
- Coordinates: 35°40′2″N 63°17′28″E
- Country: Afghanistan
- Province: Badghis Province
- Time zone: + 4.30

Miranza'i is a village in Badghis Province in north western Afghanistan.
