= Bolagh-e Sabz =

Bolagh-e Sabz بلاغ سبز
- Location in Afghanistan
- Coordinates: 34°44′N 67°41′E
- Country: Afghanistan
- Province: Bamyan
- Time zone: + 4.30

Bolagh-e Sabz (Persian: بلاغ سبز) is a village in Bamyan Province in northern-central Afghanistan.

== See also ==
- Bamyan Province
