= Kandeh Sang =

- Location in Afghanistan
- Coordinates: 35°35′26″N 68°35′36″E
- Country: Afghanistan
- Province: Baghlan Province
- Time zone: + 4.30

Kandeh Sang is a village in Baghlan Province in north eastern Afghanistan.

It lies several miles (kilometres) west of Dushi.

== See also ==
- Baghlan Province
