= Volar, Afghanistan =

Volar
- Location in Afghanistan
- Coordinates: 37°04′19″N 70°45′52″E
- Country: Afghanistan
- Province: Badakhshan Province
- Time zone: + 4.30

Volar (also Romanized as Volār, Ulyar, Ular, Wulāṟ) is a town in Badakhshan Province, Afghanistan.

== See also ==
- Badakhshan Province
