= Siah Gerd =

- Location in Afghanistan
- Coordinates: 36°55′26″N 67°4′48″E
- Country: Afghanistan
- Province: Balkh Province
- Time zone: + 4.30

Siah Gerd is a village in Balkh Province in northern Afghanistan.

== See also ==
- Balkh Province
