= Galleh Chaghar =

- Location in Afghanistan
- Coordinates: 34°44′52″N 62°46′58″E
- Country: Afghanistan
- Province: Badghis Province
- Time zone: + 4.30

Galleh Chaghar is a village in Badghis Province in north western Afghanistan.
