= Kariz-e Zaman-e Pa'in =

- Location in Afghanistan
- Coordinates: 34°51′0″N 62°28′43″E
- Country: Afghanistan
- Province: Badghis Province
- Time zone: + 4.30

Kariz-e Zaman-e Pa'in is a village in Badghis Province in north western Afghanistan.
