= Khazget =

- Location in Afghanistan
- Coordinates: 36°58′0″N 72°56′0″E
- Country: Afghanistan
- Province: Badakhshan Province
- District: Wakhan
- Elevation: 11,293 ft (3,442 m)
- Time zone: UTC+4:30 (Afghanistan Time)

Khazget is a village in Badakhshan Province in north-eastern Afghanistan.
