= Dugh Ghalat =

Dugh Ghalat Dūgh Ghalaţ
- Location in Afghanistan
- Coordinates: 37°7′38″N 70°21′18″E
- Country: Afghanistan
- Province: Badakhshan Province
- District: Argo
- Time zone: + 4.30

Dugh Ghalat is a village in Badakhshan Province in north-eastern Afghanistan.
