= Dahan-e Darreh Chasht =

- Location in Afghanistan
- Coordinates: 34°57′N 66°32′E
- Country: Afghanistan
- Province: Bamyan Province
- Time zone: + 4.30

Dahan-e Darreh Chasht is a village in Bamyan Province in northern-central Afghanistan.

== See also ==
- Bamyan Province
