= Abi Jan =

Village in Helmand Province, Afghanistan

- Village
- Abi Jan (Afghanistan)
- Interactive map of Abi Jan
- Coordinates: 31°31′55″N 64°21′25″E
- Country: Afghanistan
- Province: Helmand Province
- Time zone: +4:30

Abi Jan (Pashto: ابۍ جانې) is a village in Helmand Province, in southwestern Afghanistan.

== See also ==
- Helmand Province
