= Baraqi =

- Location in Afghanistan
- Coordinates: 36°02′N 68°58′E
- Country: Afghanistan
- Province: Baghlan Province
- Time zone: + 4.30

Baraqi is a village in the Baghlan Province in north eastern Afghanistan.

== See also ==
- Baghlan Province
