= Nesharv =

- Location in Afghanistan
- Coordinates: 38°3′55″N 71°13′45″E
- Country: Afghanistan
- Province: Badakhshan Province
- Time zone: + 4.30

Nesharv is a village in Badakhshan Province in north-eastern Afghanistan.

== See also ==
- Badakhshan Province
