= Kucheh-ye Zard =

- Location in Afghanistan
- Coordinates: 34°50′35″N 62°56′23″E
- Country: Afghanistan
- Province: Badghis Province
- Time zone: + 4.30

Kucheh-ye Zard is a village in Badghis Province in north western Afghanistan.
