= Taghir Pata =

- Location in Afghanistan
- Coordinates: 37°9′27″N 67°16′28″E
- Country: Afghanistan
- Province: Balkh Province
- Time zone: + 4.30

Taghir Pata is a village in Balkh Province in northern Afghanistan.

== See also ==
- Balkh Province
