= Bay Malasi =

Bay Malasi Bay Mālasi
- Location in Afghanistan
- Coordinates: 37°07′54″N 70°30′46″E
- Country: Afghanistan
- Province: Badakhshan Province
- District: Argo
- Time zone: + 4.30

Bay Malasi is a village in Badakhshan Province in north-eastern Afghanistan.
