= Azan, Afghanistan =

Village in Helmand Province, Afghanistan

Āzān آزان
- Village
- Interactive map of Āzān
- Coordinates: 32°16′8″N 64°59′29″E
- Country: Afghanistan
- Province: Helmand Province
- Time zone: + 4.30

Āzān (Pashto: آزان) is a village in Helmand Province, in southwestern Afghanistan.

== See also ==
- Helmand Province
