= Laron, Afghanistan =

Laron لرون
- Location in Afghanistan
- Coordinates: 38°6′5″N 70°28′1″E
- Country: Afghanistan
- Province: Badakhshan Province
- District: Shekay
- Time zone: UTC+4:30

Laron لرون is a village in Badakhshan Province in north-eastern Afghanistan.
