= Shorshoreh =

- Location in Afghanistan
- Coordinates: 35°24′16″N 63°59′42″E
- Country: Afghanistan
- Province: Badghis Province
- Time zone: + 4.30

Shorshoreh is a village in Badghis Province in north western Afghanistan.
