= Do Abi =

- Location in Afghanistan
- Coordinates: 34°46′N 67°46′E
- Country: Afghanistan
- Province: Bamyan Province
- Time zone: + 4.30

Do Abi is a village in Bamyan Province in central Afghanistan.

== See also ==
- Bamyan Province
