= Kalan Eylgah =

Kalan Eylgah Kalān Eylgah
- Location in Afghanistan
- Coordinates: 37°22′54″N 70°43′47″E
- Country: Afghanistan
- Province: Badakhshan Province
- District: Kohistan
- Time zone: + 4.30

Kalan Eylgah is a village in Badakhshan Province in north-eastern Afghanistan.
