= Islam Pinjah =

Islām Pinjah اسلام پنجه
- Village
- Interactive map of Islām Pinjah
- Coordinates: 37°17′44″N 66°20′18″E
- Country: Afghanistan
- Province: Balkh Province
- Time zone: + 4.30

Islām Pinjah (Persian: اسلام پنجه), sometimes transliterated as Eslām Panjāh, is a village in Balkh Province, in northern Afghanistan.

== See also ==
- Balkh Province
