= Istoway =

Istoway استوی
- Village
- Interactive map of Istoway
- Coordinates: 31°59′48″N 63°9′0″E
- Country: Afghanistan
- Province: Nimruz Province
- Time zone: + 4.30

Istoway (Persian: استوی), sometimes called Estovay or Istoi, is a village in Nimroz Province, in western Afghanistan.
