= Taghan Aregh =

- Location in Afghanistan
- Coordinates: 37°1′18″N 66°39′25″E
- Country: Afghanistan
- Province: Balkh Province
- Time zone: + 4.30

Taghan Aregh is a village in Balkh Province in northern Afghanistan.

== See also ==
- Balkh Province
