= Kheyr Khaneh =

- Location in Afghanistan
- Coordinates: 34°57′0″N 63°36′0″E
- Country: Afghanistan
- Province: Badghis Province
- Time zone: + 4.30

Kheyr Khaneh is a village in Badghis Province in north western Afghanistan.
