= Pitav =

Pitav پیتاو
- Location in Afghanistan
- Coordinates: 37°40′50″N 70°22′56″E
- Country: Afghanistan
- Province: Badakhshan Province
- Time zone: + 4.30

Pitav پیتاو is a village in Badakhshan Province in north-eastern Afghanistan.

== See also ==
- Badakhshan Province
