= Onay, Afghanistan =

Village in Nangarhar Province

Onay انی
- Village
- Interactive map of Onay
- Coordinates: 32°46′22″N 65°9′5″E
- Country: Afghanistan
- Province: Helmand Province
- Time zone: + 4.30

Onay (Arabic: انی) is a village in Helmand Province, in southwestern Afghanistan.
