= Ba Khersak =

Ba Khersak Bā Khersak
- Location in Afghanistan
- Coordinates: 37°51′40″N 71°7′14″E
- Country: Afghanistan
- Province: Badakhshan Province
- District: Nusay
- Time zone: + 4.30

Ba Khersak is a village in Badakhshan Province in north-eastern Afghanistan.
