= Seh Kushk =

- Location in Afghanistan
- Coordinates: 34°39′N 63°45′E
- Country: Afghanistan
- Province: Badghis Province
- Time zone: + 4.30

Seh Kushk is a village in Badghis Province in north western Afghanistan.
