= Kowkcha'il =

- Location in Afghanistan
- Coordinates: 34°52′39″N 62°49′30″E
- Country: Afghanistan
- Province: Badghis Province
- Time zone: + 4.30

Kowkcha'il is a village in Badghis Province in north western Afghanistan.
