= Nahr-e Shahi =

- Location in Afghanistan
- Coordinates: 36°42′0″N 67°5′0″E
- Country: Afghanistan
- Province: Balkh Province
- Time zone: + 4.30

Nahr-e Shahi is a village in Balkh Province in northern Afghanistan.

== See also ==
- Balkh Province
