= Dahan-e Koklan =

- Location in Afghanistan
- Coordinates: 34°51′50″N 62°33′21″E
- Country: Afghanistan
- Province: Badghis Province
- Time zone: + 4.30

Dahan-e Koklan is a village in Badghis Province in north western Afghanistan.
