= Islam Towarabaf =

Islām Towarabaf اسلام توربف
- Village
- Interactive map of Islām Towarabaf
- Coordinates: 37°2′35″N 66°14′1″E
- Country: Afghanistan
- Province: Jowzjan Province
- Time zone: + 4.30

Islām Towarabaf (Pashto: اسلام توربف), sometimes called Eslām Tavāreh Bāf, is a village in Jowzjan Province, in northern Afghanistan.

== See also ==
- Jowzjan Province
