= Shahr-e Arman =

- Location in Afghanistan
- Coordinates: 34°38′N 63°51′E
- Country: Afghanistan
- Province: Badghis Province
- Time zone: + 4.30

Shahr-e Arman is a village in Badghis Province in north western Afghanistan.
