= Urgand =

- Location in Afghanistan
- Coordinates: 36°49′2″N 72°3′30″E
- Country: Afghanistan
- Province: Badakhshan Province
- Time zone: + 4.30

Urgand is a village in Badakhshan Province in north-eastern Afghanistan.

== See also ==
- Badakhshan Province
