= Bagag =

Bagag باگاگ
- Location in Afghanistan
- Coordinates: 34°38′N 66°50′E
- Country: Afghanistan
- Province: Bamyan
- Time zone: + 4.30

Bagag (Persian: باگاگ) is a village in Bamyan Province in northern-central Afghanistan.

== See also ==
- Bamyan Province
