= Darreh-ye Bum =

- Location in Afghanistan
- Coordinates: 35°8′7″N 63°28′8″E
- Country: Afghanistan
- Province: Badghis Province
- Time zone: + 4.30

Darreh-ye Bum is a village in Badghis Province in north western Afghanistan.
