= Boland Dival =

Boland Dival بلند دیوال
- Location in Afghanistan
- Coordinates: 34°3′N 67°30′E
- Country: Afghanistan
- Province: Bamyan
- Time zone: + 4.30

Boland Dival (Persian: بلند دیوال) is a village in Bamyan Province in northern-central Afghanistan.

== See also ==
- Bamyan Province
