= Mina Do =

- Location in Afghanistan
- Coordinates: 35°51′14″N 70°51′24″E
- Country: Afghanistan
- Province: Badakhshan Province
- Elevation: 7,703 ft (2,348 m)
- Time zone: + 4.30

Mina Do is a village in Badakhshan Province in northeast Afghanistan.

== Geography ==
The village lies towards the northern edge of the Hindu Kush mountain range which crosses over into Pakistan and is at an elevation of 7,703 feet (2,348 m).

Mina Do is situated 0.4 miles (640 m) away from Waskow, 0.4 miles (640 m) away from Bown-e Bad, 0.2 miles (320 m) away from Hajdah Wun and 0.8 miles (1.3 km) away from Lech.

== Transport ==
The nearest airport is 42 miles (68 km) to the north, at Kulyab.

== See also ==
- Badakhshan Province
