= Kangurchi =

Kangurchi Kangurchī
- Location in Afghanistan
- Coordinates: 36°45′2″N 70°9′6″E
- Country: Afghanistan
- Province: Badakhshan Province
- District: Kishim
- Time zone: + 4.30

Kangurchi is a village in Badakhshan Province in north-eastern Afghanistan.
