= Amrud =

- Location in Afghanistan
- Coordinates: 38°12′N 71°19′E
- Country: Afghanistan
- Province: Badakhshan Province
- District: Nusay

Amrud is a village located in the Darwaz area of Afghanistan, situated near the Amu Darya.
