= Zir-e Pol-e Juy =

- Location in Afghanistan
- Coordinates: 38°17′7″N 70°49′48″E
- Country: Afghanistan
- Province: Badakhshan Province
- Time zone: + 4.30

Zir-e Pol-e Juy is a village in Badakhshan Province in north-eastern Afghanistan.

It lies near the border with Tajikistan.

== See also ==
- Badakhshan Province
