= Barfak =

- Location in Afghanistan
- Coordinates: 35°20′57″N 68°09′40″E
- Country: Afghanistan
- Province: Baghlan Province
- Time zone: + 4.30

Barfak is a village in Baghlan Province in north eastern Afghanistan.

== See also ==
- Baghlan Province
