= Takht-e Ghowrmach =

- Location in Afghanistan
- Coordinates: 35°45′12″N 63°45′22″E
- Country: Afghanistan
- Province: Badghis Province
- Time zone: + 4.30

Takht-e Ghowrmach is a village in Badghis Province in north western Afghanistan.
