= Khughaz =

Khughaz Khūghaz̄
- Location in Afghanistan
- Coordinates: 38°25′9″N 70°50′40″E
- Country: Afghanistan
- Province: Badakhshan Province
- District: Maimay
- Elevation: 4,900 ft (1,500 m)
- Time zone: + 4.30

Khughaz Persian: خوغز is a village in Badakhshan Province in north-eastern Afghanistan.
