= Powkowy =

- Location in Afghanistan
- Coordinates: 36°59′7″N 72°28′50″E
- Country: Afghanistan
- Province: Badakhshan Province
- Time zone: + 4.30

Powkowy is a village in Badakhshan Province in north-eastern Afghanistan.

== See also ==
- Badakhshan Province
