= Khak-e Cheghel =

- Location in Afghanistan
- Coordinates: 34°35′53″N 67°10′54″E
- Country: Afghanistan
- Province: Bamyan Province
- Time zone: + 4.30

Khak-e Cheghel is a village in Bamyan Province in central Afghanistan.

== See also ==
- Bamyan Province
