= Av Darreh =

Av Darreh آو دره
- Location in Afghanistan
- Coordinates: 34°36′15″N 67°32′50″E
- Country: Afghanistan
- Province: Bamyan
- Time zone: + 4.30

Av Darreh (Persian: آو دره) is a village in Bamyan Province in northern-central Afghanistan.
