= Ingishkah =

Ingīshkah انگیشکه
- Village
- Interactive map of Ingīshkah
- Coordinates: 36°11′58″N 65°52′08″E
- Country: Afghanistan
- Province: Sar-e Pol Province
- Time zone: + 4.30

Ingīshkah (Dari: انگیشکه) is a village in Sar-e Pol Province, in northern Afghanistan.

== See also ==
- Sar-e Pol Province
