= Khak Dow =

- Location in Afghanistan
- Coordinates: 34°57′20″N 67°15′39″E
- Country: Afghanistan
- Province: Bamyan Province
- Time zone: + 4.30

Khak Dow is a village in Bamyan Province in central Afghanistan.

== See also ==
- Bamyan Province
