= Shahran, Afghanistan =

Shahran
- Location in Afghanistan
- Coordinates: 35°58′57″N 70°53′55″E
- Country: Afghanistan
- Province: Badakhshan Province
- Time zone: + 4.30

Shahran is a village in Badakhshan Province in north-eastern Afghanistan.

== See also ==
- Badakhshan Province
