= Robat-e Payan =

- Location in Afghanistan
- Coordinates: 36°16′34″N 70°41′22″E
- Country: Afghanistan
- Province: Badakhshan Province
- Time zone: + 4.30

Robat-e Payan is a village in Badakhshan Province in north-eastern Afghanistan.

== See also ==
- Badakhshan Province
