= Hasan Tal =

- Location in Afghanistan
- Coordinates: 36°13′27″N 68°47′57″E
- Country: Afghanistan
- Province: Baghlan Province
- Time zone: + 4.30

Hasan Tal is a village in Baghlan Province in northeast Afghanistan.

== See also ==
- Baghlan Province
