= Kuh Gaday =

- Location in Afghanistan
- Coordinates: 35°1′52″N 67°38′22″E
- Country: Afghanistan
- Province: Bamyan Province
- Time zone: + 4.30

Kuh Gaday is a village in Bamyan Province in central Afghanistan.

== See also ==
- Bamyan Province
