= Kushgag =

- Location in Afghanistan
- Coordinates: 36°46′10″N 70°58′18″E
- Country: Afghanistan
- Province: Badakhshan Province
- District: Jurm
- Elevation: 8,460 ft (2,580 m)
- Time zone: + 4.30

Kushgag (alternative names, Kušgag or Kusgag) is a village in Badakhshan Province in north-eastern Afghanistan.

== Geography ==
The village lies towards the northern edge of the Hindu Kush mountain range which crosses over into Pakistan and is at an elevation of 8,467 feet (2,581 m)

Kushgag is situated 5.5 miles (8.9 km) away from Kitep, 5.9 miles (9.5 km) away from Kyip, 2 miles (3.2 km) away from Pular and 4.1 miles (6.6 km) away from Ilah.

== History ==
On 6 April 2004 the village was affected by the earthquake that affected parts of Badakhshan. Kushgag was only 35 kilometres (22 mi) from the earthquake epicentre and was listed by the European Union as an area of assistance following the quake.

== Transport ==
The nearest airport is 94 kilometres (58 mi) to the north, at Khorog.
