= Yasich =

- Location in Afghanistan
- Coordinates: 37°3′8″N 71°16′57″E
- Country: Afghanistan
- Province: Badakhshan Province
- Time zone: + 4.30

Yasich is a village in Badakhshan Province in north-eastern Afghanistan.

== See also ==
- Badakhshan Province
