= Langar Khaneh-ye Kalan =

- Location in Afghanistan
- Coordinates: 36°45′52″N 67°1′37″E
- Country: Afghanistan
- Province: Balkh Province
- Time zone: + 4.30

Langar Khaneh-ye Kalan is a village in Balkh Province in northern Afghanistan.

== See also ==
- Balkh Province
