= Cheshmeh-ye Duzakh =

- Location in Afghanistan
- Coordinates: 35°5′16″N 63°5′18″E
- Country: Afghanistan
- Province: Badghis Province
- Time zone: + 4.30

Cheshmeh-ye Duzakh is a village in Badghis Province in north western Afghanistan.
