= Park, Afghanistan =

Park
- Location in Afghanistan
- Coordinates: 37°2′N 70°55′E
- Country: Afghanistan
- Province: Badakhshan Province
- Time zone: + 4.30

Park is a village in Badakhshan Province in north-eastern Afghanistan.

== See also ==
- Badakhshan Province
