= Ka Chona =

Village in Nangarhar Province, Afghanistan

Ka Chona (Pashto: کاچونا) is a village in the province Nangarhar in Afghanistan.

At a wedding party on July 6, 2008, 47 Afghan civilians were killed by the US Air Force.

== See also ==
- Nangarhar Province
