= Regay =

Village in Kandahar Province, Afghanistan

- Village
- Location in Afghanistan
- Coordinates: 31°35′55″N 65°41′24″E
- Country: Afghanistan
- Province: Kandahar Province
- Time zone: + 4.30

Regay (Pashto: ریګي) is a village in Kandahar Province, in southern Afghanistan. It is a southwestern suburb of Kandahar.

== See also ==
- Kandahar Province
