= Mangan, Afghanistan =

Mangan
- Location in Afghanistan
- Coordinates: 35°29′1″N 63°9′14″E
- Country: Afghanistan
- Province: Badghis Province
- Time zone: + 4.30

Mangan is a village in Badghis Province in north western Afghanistan, close to the border with Turkmenistan.
