= Bayri =

Bayri بایری
- Location in Afghanistan
- Coordinates: 34°36′55″N 67°03′10″E
- Country: Afghanistan
- Province: Bamyan
- Time zone: + 4.30

Bayri (Persian: بایری) is a village in Bamyan Province in northern-central Afghanistan.

== See also ==
- Bamyan Province
