= Barikak =

Barikak باریکک
- Location in Afghanistan
- Coordinates: 34°06′N 67°48′E
- Country: Afghanistan
- Province: Bamyan
- Time zone: + 4.30

Barikak (Persian: باریکک) is a village in Bamyan Province in northern-central Afghanistan.

== See also ==
- Bamyan Province
