= Bid-e Kalan =

Bid-e Kalan Bīd-e Kalān
- Location in Afghanistan
- Coordinates: 37°20′45″N 70°18′37″E
- Country: Afghanistan
- Province: Badakhshan Province
- District: Yaftali Sufla
- Time zone: + 4.30

Bid-e Kalan is a village in Badakhshan Province in north-eastern Afghanistan.
