= Bala Kuh =

- Location in Afghanistan
- Coordinates: 36°34′31″N 66°49′13″E
- Country: Afghanistan
- Province: Balkh Province

Area
  - Total: 251,830 sq mi (652,230 km^{2})

Population
  - Total: 30,419
- Time zone: + 4.30

Bala Kuh is a village in Balkh Province in northern Afghanistan. It has a population of 30,419 and a total area of 652,230 km. The capital city is Kabul and the currency is Afghanis.

== See also ==
- Balkh Province
