= Yalur =

- Location in Afghanistan
- Coordinates: 37°37′27″N 70°16′17″E
- Country: Afghanistan
- Province: Badakhshan Province
- Time zone: + 4.30

Yalur is a village in Badakhshan Province in north-eastern Afghanistan.

== See also ==
- Badakhshan Province
