= Rowchun =

- Location in Afghanistan
- Coordinates: 37°0′15″N 73°14′33″E
- Country: Afghanistan
- Province: Badakhshan Province
- Time zone: + 4.30

Rowchun or Rachun is a village in Badakhshan Province in north-eastern Afghanistan.

== See also ==
- Badakhshan Province
