= Hojm-e Bala =

Hojm-e Bala Ḩojm-e Bālā
- Location in Afghanistan
- Coordinates: 38°20′50″N 70°51′55″E
- Country: Afghanistan
- Province: Badakhshan Province
- District: Maimay
- Time zone: + 4.30

Hojm-e Bala is a village in Badakhshan Province in north-eastern Afghanistan.
