= Bozba'i =

- Location in Afghanistan
- Coordinates: 35°27′5″N 63°23′0″E
- Country: Afghanistan
- Province: Badghis Province
- Time zone: + 4.30

Bozba'i is a village in Badghis Province in north western Afghanistan.
