= Pas-e Pashar =

Pas-e Pasharپسی پاشر
- Location in Afghanistan
- Coordinates: 37°59′52″N 70°32′5″E
- Country: Afghanistan
- Province: Badakhshan Province
- Time zone: + 4.30

Pas-e Pashar پسی پاشر is a village in Badakhshan Province in north-eastern Afghanistan.

== See also ==
- Badakhshan Province
