= Tozhna-i-Nasiri =

- Location in Afghanistan
- Coordinates: 36°47′4″N 66°52′57″E
- Country: Afghanistan
- Province: Balkh Province
- Time zone: + 4.30

Tozhna-i-Nasiri is a village in Balkh Province in northern Afghanistan.

== See also ==
- Balkh Province
