= Som Darreh =

- Location in Afghanistan
- Coordinates: 37°6′25″N 70°42′50″E
- Country: Afghanistan
- Province: Badakhshan Province
- Time zone: + 4.30

Som Darreh is a village in Badakhshan Province in north-eastern Afghanistan.

== See also ==
- Badakhshan Province
