= Hojm-e Pa'in =

Hojm-e Pa'in Ḩojm-e Pā'īn
- Location in Afghanistan
- Coordinates: 38°22′2″N 70°51′16″E
- Country: Afghanistan
- Province: Badakhshan Province
- District: Maimay
- Time zone: + 4.30

Hojm-e Pa'in is a village in Badakhshan Province in north-eastern Afghanistan.
