= Pak, Afghanistan =

Pak
- Location in Afghanistan
- Coordinates: 36°59′13″N 72°32′51″E
- Country: Afghanistan
- Province: Badakhshan Province
- Time zone: + 4.30

Pak is a village in Badakhshan Province in north-eastern Afghanistan, close to the border with Tajikistan.

== See also ==
- Badakhshan Province
