= Gonbad-e Pa'in =

Gonbad-e Pa'in Gonbad-e Pā'īn
- Location in Afghanistan
- Coordinates: 36°54′51″N 70°3′49″E
- Country: Afghanistan
- Province: Badakhshan Province
- District: Kishim
- Time zone: + 4.30

Gonbad-e Pa'in is a village in Badakhshan Province in north-eastern Afghanistan.
