= Ghowchak =

Settlement in Nangarhar Province, Afghanistan

- Country: Afghanistan
- Province: Nangarhar Province

Population (2002)
  - Total: 3,000
- Time zone: UTC+4:30

Ghowchak (Pashto: غوچک Ghowchak) is a village in Surkh-Rod District in Nangarhar province in Afghanistan, 20 km east of Jalalabad city near the Jwe Haft. Its population is 3,000 (2002 official estimate).

== See also ==
- Nangarhar Province
