= Tang, Badakhshan =

Tang تنگ
- Location in Afghanistan
- Coordinates: 37°50′9″N 70°16′56″E
- Country: Afghanistan
- Province: Badakhshan Province
- Time zone: + 4.30

Tang تنگ is a village in Badakhshan Province in north-eastern Afghanistan.

== See also ==
- Badakhshan Province
