= Kawida =

Kawida Kawīda
- Location in Afghanistan
- Coordinates: 38°19′16″N 71°12′6″E
- Country: Afghanistan
- Province: Badakhshan Province
- District: Nusay
- Time zone: + 4.30

Kawida is a village in Badakhshan Province in north-eastern Afghanistan.
