= Zaher Khune =

Zaher Khune زهرخونه
- Village
- Location in Afghanistan
- Coordinates: 32°28′33″N 66°34′14″E
- Country: Afghanistan
- Province: Zabul Province

Population
  - Total: 1,646

Zaher Khune (Pashto: زهرخونه) is a small town in Afghanistan with a population of around 1,646.

== See also ==
- Zabul Province
