= Khar Kat-e Bala =

Khar Kat-e Bala Khar Kat-e Bālā
- Location in Afghanistan
- Coordinates: 38°16′31″N 70°55′46″E
- Country: Afghanistan
- Province: Badakhshan Province
- District: Maimay
- Time zone: + 4.30

Khurkat-e Bala is a village in Badakhshan Province in north-eastern Afghanistan.
