= Gharji, Badakhshan =

Gharji Gharjī
- Location in Afghanistan
- Coordinates: 36°55′1″N 70°27′28″E
- Country: Afghanistan
- Province: Badakhshan Province
- District: Darayim
- Time zone: + 4.30

Gharji is a village in Badakhshan Province in north-eastern Afghanistan.
