= Shkharow =

Shkharow شخرو
- Location in Afghanistan
- Coordinates: 37°55′57″N 70°39′13″E
- Country: Afghanistan
- Province: Badakhshan Province
- Time zone: + 4.30

Shkharow شخرو is a village in Badakhshan Province in north-eastern Afghanistan.

== See also ==
- Badakhshan Province
