= Woring =

Village in Afghanistan

- Location in Afghanistan
- Coordinates: 37°18′24″N 70°27′34″E
- Country: Afghanistan
- Province: Badakhshan Province
- Time zone: + 4.30

Woring is a village in Badakhshan Province in north-eastern Afghanistan.

== See also ==
- Badakhshan Province
