= Kariz-e Zaman-e Kalgandi =

- Location in Afghanistan
- Coordinates: 34°47′29″N 62°28′41″E
- Country: Afghanistan
- Province: Badghis Province
- Time zone: + 4.30

Kariz-e Zaman-e Kalgandi is a village in Badghis Province in north western Afghanistan.
