= Tarang, Afghanistan =

Tarang Tarang
- Location in Afghanistan
- Coordinates: 36°55′21″N 71°2′57″E
- Country: Afghanistan
- Province: Badakhshan Province
- Time zone: + 4.30

Tarang is a village in Badakhshan Province in north-eastern Afghanistan.

== See also ==
- Badakhshan Province
