= Barik-e Sofla =

Barik-e Sofla باریکی سفلی
- Location in Afghanistan
- Coordinates: 34°22′N 66°39′E
- Country: Afghanistan
- Province: Bamyan
- Time zone: + 4.30

Barik-e Sofla (Persian: باریکی سفلی) is a village in Bamyan Province in northern-central Afghanistan.

== See also ==
- Bamyan Province
