= Bazar-e Taleh =

- Location in Afghanistan
- Coordinates: 35°23′19″N 68°13′17″E
- Country: Afghanistan
- Province: Baghlan Province
- Elevation: 3,957 ft (1,206 m)
- Time zone: + 4.30

Bazar-e Taleh is a village in Baghlan Province in north eastern Afghanistan.

== Climate ==
Bazar-e Taleh has a humid continental climate (Köppen climate classification: Dsb) with warm summers and cold winters.

Climate data for Parun
Month	Jan	Feb	Mar	Apr	May	Jun	Jul	Aug	Sep	Oct	Nov	Dec	Year
Daily mean °C (°F)	−4.3 (24.3)	−2.6 (27.3)	3.3 (37.9)	9.0 (48.2)	13.4 (56.1)	18.1 (64.6)	20.4 (68.7)	19.2 (66.6)	15.4 (59.7)	9.7 (49.5)	3.5 (38.3)	−2 (28)	8.6 (47.4)
Average precipitation mm (inches)	29.3 (1.15)	47.5 (1.87)	47.0 (1.85)	76.0 (2.99)	99.4 (3.91)	16.1 (0.63)	9.7 (0.38)	6.5 (0.26)	4.2 (0.17)	14.7 (0.58)	29.5 (1.16)	16.2 (0.64)	396.1 (15.59)
Average relative humidity (%)	71	77	76	59	47	35	30	33	30	36	52	60	51
Source 1: ClimateCharts(1988-2017)
Source 2: World Weather Online

(Precipitation & Humidity)

== See also ==
- Baghlan Province
