= Takaka, Afghanistan =

Takaka تکاکا
- Dene
- Location in Afghanistan
- Coordinates: 37°50′29″N 70°15′38″E
- Country: Afghanistan
- Province: Badakhshan
- District: Khwahan
- Time zone: + 4.30

Takaka (Persian: تکاکا) is a dene in northeastern Afghanistan. It is located in Khwahan District, Badakhshan Province.

== See also ==
- Badakhshan Province
