= Patukh =

- Location in Afghanistan
- Coordinates: 37°0′32″N 73°22′42″E
- Country: Afghanistan
- Province: Badakhshan Province
- Time zone: + 4.30

Patukh is a village in the Wakhan, Badakhshan Province in north-eastern Afghanistan. Patukh is inhabited by Wakhi people. The population of the village (2003) is 405.

== See also ==
- Badakhshan Province
