= Yaram-e Sofla =

- Location in Afghanistan
- Coordinates: 35°55′48″N 69°15′45″E
- Country: Afghanistan
- Province: Baghlan Province
- Time zone: + 4.30

Yaram-e Sofla is a village in Baghlan Province in north eastern Afghanistan.

== See also ==
- Baghlan Province
