= Darreh-ye Jalmesh =

- Location in Afghanistan
- Coordinates: 35°0′39″N 68°3′40″E
- Country: Afghanistan
- Province: Bamyan Province
- Time zone: + 4.30

Darreh-ye Jalmesh is a village in Bamyan Province in northern-central Afghanistan.

== See also ==
- Bamyan Province
