= Far Ghambowl =

- Location in Afghanistan
- Coordinates: 37°14′6″N 70°21′45″E
- Country: Afghanistan
- Province: Badakhshan Province
- District: Yaftali Sufla
- Time zone: + 4.30

Far Ghambowl is a village in Badakhshan Province in north-eastern Afghanistan.
