= Panam, Afghanistan =

Panam
- Location in Afghanistan
- Coordinates: 35°50′24″N 70°50′50″E
- Country: Afghanistan
- Province: Badakhshan Province
- Time zone: + 4.30

Panam is a village in Badakhshan Province in north-eastern Afghanistan.

== See also ==
- Badakhshan Province
