= Akhjar =

Akhjar Ākhjār
- Location in Afghanistan
- Coordinates: 37°11′N 69°47′E
- Country: Afghanistan
- Province: Takhar Province

Akhjar is a village in Afghanistan, located in the Rustak Valley, about four miles north of Rustak. At the beginning of the 20th century, there were 112 Hazara houses in the village.
