= Folowl-e Pa'in =

- Location in Afghanistan
- Coordinates: 36°13′12″N 69°15′2″E
- Country: Afghanistan
- Province: Baghlan Province
- Time zone: + 4.30

Folowl-e Pa'in is a village in Baghlan Province in north eastern Afghanistan.

== See also ==
- Baghlan Province
