= Watarmah-ye Pa'in =

Wātarmah-ye Pā’īn
- Village
- Location in Afghanistan
- Coordinates: 34°17′N 66°9′E
- Country: Afghanistan
- Province: Daykundi Province
- Time zone: + 4.30

Wātarmah-ye Pā’īn is a village in Daykundi Province, in central Afghanistan.

== See also ==
- Daykundi Province
