= Godri =

- Location in Afghanistan
- Coordinates: 36°3′40″N 69°17′12″E
- Country: Afghanistan
- Province: Baghlan Province
- Time zone: + 4.30

Godri is a village in Baghlan Province in north eastern Afghanistan.

== See also ==
- Baghlan Province
