= Ilbak =

Village in Afghanistan

Ilbak البک
- Village
- Interactive map of Ilbak
- Coordinates: 32°13′59″N 66°6′42″E
- Country: Afghanistan
- Province: Kandahar Province
- Time zone: + 4.30

Ilbak (Pashto: البک) is a village in Kandahar Province, in southern Afghanistan.
