= Gharmeh =

- Location in Afghanistan
- Coordinates: 34°47′24″N 64°8′3″E
- Country: Afghanistan
- Province: Badghis Province
- Time zone: + 4.30

Gharmeh is a village in Badghis Province in north western Afghanistan.
