= Bay Temor =

- Location in Afghanistan
- Coordinates: 36°40′09″N 66°45′27″E
- Country: Afghanistan
- Province: Balkh Province
- Districts: Chimtal District
- Time zone: + 4.30

Bay Temor is a village in Balkh Province in northern Afghanistan.

== See also ==
- Balkh Province
