= Bia Mordeh =

Bia Mordeh بیامرده
- Location in Afghanistan
- Coordinates: 34°57′N 68°12′E
- Country: Afghanistan
- Province: Bamyan
- Time zone: + 4.30

Bia Mordeh (Persian: بیامرده) is a village in Bamyan Province in northern-central Afghanistan.

== See also ==
- Bamyan Province
