= Sabzi Bahar =

- Location in Afghanistan
- Coordinates: 37°10′17″N 70°14′43″E
- Country: Afghanistan
- Province: Badakhshan Province
- Time zone: + 4.30

Sabzi Bahar is a village in Badakhshan Province in north-eastern Afghanistan.

== See also ==
- Badakhshan Province
