= Kowarzan =

Kowarzān کورزان Qabarzān (كورزان)
- Village
- Location in Afghanistan
- Coordinates: 34°17′31″N 62°7′36″E
- Country: Afghanistan
- Province: Herat Province
- Time zone: + 4.30

Kowarzān (Persian: کورزان) or Qabarzān (Persian: كورزان) is a village in Herat Province, in northwestern Afghanistan.

== See also ==
- Herat Province
