= Lar-e Gari =

- Location in Afghanistan
- Coordinates: 34°59′N 67°57′E
- Country: Afghanistan
- Province: Bamyan Province
- Time zone: + 4.30

Lar-e Gari is a village in Bamyan Province in central Afghanistan.

== See also ==
- Bamyan Province
