= Bastukbacheh =

Bastukbacheh بستک بچه
- Location in Afghanistan
- Coordinates: 34°09′N 67°03′E
- Country: Afghanistan
- Province: Bamyan
- Time zone: + 4.30

Bastukbacheh (Persian: بستک بچه) is a village in Bamyan Province in northern-central Afghanistan. It uses Afghanistan Standard Time (UTC+4:30).

== See also ==
- Bamyan Province
