= Arghandakan =

Arghandakan Arghandakān
- Location in Afghanistan
- Coordinates: 36°50′26″N 70°18′11″E
- Country: Afghanistan
- Province: Badakhshan Province
- District: Tishkan
- Time zone: + 4.30

Arghandakan is a village in Badakhshan Province in north-eastern Afghanistan.
