= Qalʽeh-ye Bar Panj =

- Location in Afghanistan
- Coordinates: 37°33′N 71°28′E
- Country: Afghanistan
- Province: Badakhshan Province
- Time zone: + 4.30

Qalʽeh-ye Bar Panj is a village in Badakhshan Province in north-eastern Afghanistan.

It is located on the border with Tajikistan.

== See also ==
- Badakhshan Province
