= Shahab od Din, Afghanistan =

Village in Baghlan Province, Afghanistan

Shahab od Din
- Location in Afghanistan
- Coordinates: 36°2′7″N 68°38′24″E
- Country: Afghanistan
- Province: Baghlan Province
- Time zone: UTC+04:30

Shahab od Din is a village in Baghlan Province in northeastern Afghanistan.

== See also ==
- Baghlan Province
