= Bekhe Qada =

Bekhe Qada بیخ قاده
- Location in Afghanistan
- Coordinates: 34°09′N 67°28′E
- Country: Afghanistan
- Province: Bamyan
- Time zone: + 4.30

Bekhe Qada (Persian: بیخ قاده) is a village in Bamyan Province in northern-central Afghanistan.

== See also ==
- Bamyan Province
