= Ziak =

- Location in Afghanistan
- Coordinates: 36°30′0″N 71°25′0″E
- Country: Afghanistan
- Province: Badakhshan Province
- Time zone: + 4.30

Ziak is a village in the Badakhshan Province of north-eastern Afghanistan.

== See also ==
- Badakhshan Province
