= Do Ru =

- Location in Afghanistan
- Coordinates: 35°21′48″N 67°44′27″E
- Country: Afghanistan
- Province: Bamyan Province
- Time zone: + 4.30

Do Ru is a village in Bamyan Province in central Afghanistan.

== See also ==
- Bamyan Province
