= Rom, Afghanistan =

- Location in Afghanistan
- Coordinates: 35°41′59″N 67°6′11″E
- Country: Afghanistan
- Province: Sar-e Pol Province
- Time zone: + 4.30

Rom, Afghanistan is a village in Sar-e Pol Province in northern Afghanistan.

== See also ==
- Sar-e Pol Province
