= Ravenj =

- Location in Afghanistan
- Coordinates: 37°37′14″N 70°26′16″E
- Country: Afghanistan
- Province: Badakhshan Province
- Time zone: UTC+4:30 (Afghanistan Standard Time)

Ravenj is a village in Badakhshan Province in northeastern Afghanistan.

== See also ==
- Badakhshan Province
