= Asgharat =

Asgharat اصغرات
- Location in Afghanistan
- Coordinates: 34°23′N 66°39′E
- Country: Afghanistan
- Province: Bamyan
- Time zone: + 4.30

Asgharat (Persian: اصغرات) is a village in Bamyan Province in northern-central Afghanistan.

== See also ==
- Bamyan Province
