= Shekiban =

Community in Afghanistan

Shekiban is a community in Afghanistan, approximately 40 kilometres (25 miles) west of Herat.

== See also ==
- Herat Province
