= Bid Qowl Bala =

Bid Qowl Bala بیدقول بالا
- Location in Afghanistan
- Coordinates: 34°33′N 67°30′E
- Country: Afghanistan
- Province: Bamyan
- Time zone: + 4.30

Bid Qowl Bala (Persian: بیدقول بالا) is a village in Bamyan Province in northern-central Afghanistan.

== See also ==
- Bamyan Province
