= Bazartu =

- Location in Afghanistan
- Coordinates: 35°26′52″N 63°17′33″E
- Country: Afghanistan
- Province: Badghis Province
- Time zone: + 4.30

Bazartu is a village in Badghis Province in north western Afghanistan.
