= Magh Nawul =

- Location in Afghanistan
- Coordinates: 36°2′42″N 70°57′52″E
- Country: Afghanistan
- Province: Badakhshan Province
- District: Kuran wa Munjan
- Time zone: + 4.30

Magh Nawul is a village in Badakhshan Province in north-eastern Afghanistan.
