= Kadanak =

Kādānak کادانک
- Village
- Interactive map of Kādānak
- Coordinates: 32°19′24″N 62°5′55″E
- Country: Afghanistan
- Province: Farah Province
- Time zone: + 4.30

Kādānak (Pashto: کادانک) is a village in Farah Province, in western Afghanistan.
