= Bum-e Shebar =

Bum-e Shebar بوم شبر
- Location in Afghanistan
- Coordinates: 34°49′N 67°31′E
- Country: Afghanistan
- Province: Bamyan
- Time zone: + 4.30

Bum-e Shebar (Persian: بوم شبر) is a village in Bamyan Province in northern-central Afghanistan.

== See also ==
- Bamyan Province
