= Meydan, Afghanistan =

- Location in Afghanistan
- Coordinates: 36°54′16″N 66°55′5″E
- Country: Afghanistan
- Province: Balkh Province
- Time zone: + 4.30

Meydan, Afghanistan is a village in Balkh Province in northern Afghanistan.

== See also ==
- Balkh Province
