= Barik-e ʽOlya =

Barik-e `Olya باریکی علیا
- Location in Afghanistan
- Coordinates: 34°23′N 66°39′E
- Country: Afghanistan
- Province: Bamyan
- Time zone: + 4.30

Barik-e ʽOlya (Persian: باریکی علیا) is a village in Bamyan Province in northern-central Afghanistan.

== See also ==
- Bamyan Province
