= ʽAli Gol =

`Ali Gol
- Location in Afghanistan
- Coordinates: 35°54′14″N 63°55′14″E
- Country: Afghanistan
- Province: Badghis Province
- Time zone: + 4.30

`Ali Gol is a village in Badghis Province in north western Afghanistan.
