= Andowj =

- Location in Afghanistan
- Coordinates: 37°1′0″N 71°26′0″E
- Country: Afghanistan
- Province: Badakhshan Province
- District: Ishkashim
- Time zone: + 4.30

Andowj is a village in Badakhshan Province in north-eastern Afghanistan.
