= Ghuch Zamin =

- Location in Afghanistan
- Coordinates: 34°31′47″N 67°36′26″E
- Country: Afghanistan
- Province: Bamyan Province
- Time zone: + 4.30

Ghuch Zamin is a village in Bamyan Province in central Afghanistan.

== See also ==
- Bamyan Province
