= Bahador Khani =

- Location in Afghanistan
- Coordinates: 34°47′8″N 62°37′46″E
- Country: Afghanistan
- Province: Badghis Province
- Time zone: + 4.30

Bahador Khani is a village in Badghis Province in north western Afghanistan.
