= Ghowrayd Gharami =

Ghowrayd Gharami Ghowrayd Gharamī
- Location in Afghanistan
- Coordinates: 36°31′21″N 70°47′21″E
- Country: Afghanistan
- Province: Badakhshan Province
- District: Yamgan
- Time zone: + 4.30

Ghowrayd Gharami is a village in Badakhshan Province in north-eastern Afghanistan.
