= Naʽman =

- Location in Afghanistan
- Coordinates: 35°44′10″N 68°39′27″E
- Country: Afghanistan
- Province: Baghlan Province
- Time zone: + 4.30

Naʽman is a village in Baghlan Province in north eastern Afghanistan.
