= Nilan =

- Location in Afghanistan
- Coordinates: 35°48′30″N 68°23′7″E
- Country: Afghanistan
- Province: Baghlan Province
- Time zone: + 4.30

Nilan is a village in Baghlan Province in north-eastern Afghanistan.

== See also ==
- Baghlan Province
