= Khvosh Margh =

- Location in Afghanistan
- Coordinates: 34°51′N 63°4′E
- Country: Afghanistan
- Province: Badghis Province
- Time zone: + 4.30

Khvosh Margh is a village in Badghis Province in north western Afghanistan.
