= Erganah =

- Location in Afghanistan
- Coordinates: 35°11′35″N 67°28′2″E
- Country: Afghanistan
- Province: Bamyan Province
- Time zone: + 4.30

Erganah is a village in Bamyan Province in central Afghanistan.

== See also ==
- Bamyan Province
