= ʽAraq-e ʽOlya =

ʽAraq-e ʽOlya اعراق علیا
- Location in Afghanistan
- Coordinates: 34°49′N 68°3′E
- Country: Afghanistan
- Province: Bamyan
- Time zone: + 4.30

ʽAraq-e ʽOlya (Persian: اعراق علیا) is a village in Bamyan Province in northern-central Afghanistan.

== See also ==
- Bamyan Province
