= Espandi 'Olya =

Espandi 'Olya اسپندی علیا
- Village
- Location within Afghanistan
- Coordinates: 33°28′30″N 68°24′3″E
- Country: Afghanistan
- Province: Ghazni
- Time zone: + 4.30

Espandī ‘Olya, sometimes transliterated as Espandi, Esphan Deh, Ispandi, Spandeh, Spendi Ulya, and variations thereof, (Pashto: اسپندی علیا) is a village in Ghazni Province, in eastern Afghanistan.

== See also ==
- Ghazni Province
