= Sakhari =

- Location in Afghanistan
- Coordinates: 35°22′13″N 63°25′22″E
- Country: Afghanistan
- Province: Badghis Province
- Time zone: + 4.30

Sakhari is a village in Badghis Province in north western Afghanistan.
