= Darreh-ye Joval =

- Location in Afghanistan
- Coordinates: 34°44′25″N 62°40′21″E
- Country: Afghanistan
- Province: Badghis Province
- Time zone: + 4.30

Darreh-ye Joval is a village in Badghis Province in north western Afghanistan.
