= Ghonvar =

Ghonvar Ghonvār
- Location in Afghanistan
- Coordinates: 38°12′41″N 70°46′54″E
- Country: Afghanistan
- Province: Badakhshan Province
- District: Maimay
- Time zone: + 4.30

Ghonvar is a village in Badakhshan Province in north-eastern Afghanistan.
