= Cawgay =

Cawgay کاګی
- Village
- Location in Afghanistan
- Coordinates: 32°14′13″N 66°38′36″E
- Country: Afghanistan
- Province: Zabul Province
- Time zone: + 4.30

Cawgay (Pashto: کاګی) (or Chowgaye) is a town in Zabul Province, Afghanistan. About 1,652 people live there.
