= Meymik =

Meymik Meymīk
- Location in Afghanistan
- Coordinates: 38°14′30″N 70°33′24″E
- Country: Afghanistan
- Province: Badakhshan Province
- Time zone: + 4.30

Meymik is a village in Badakhshan Province in north-eastern Afghanistan.

== See also ==
- Badakhshan Province
