= Shah-e Pari =

- Location in Afghanistan
- Coordinates: 35°54′27″N 70°53′41″E
- Country: Afghanistan
- Province: Badakhshan Province
- Time zone: + 4.30

Shah-e Pari is a village in Badakhshan Province in north-eastern Afghanistan.

== See also ==
- Badakhshan Province
