= Katway =

Coordinates: 34°46′N 67°46′E

Katway (Persian: کتوای) is a village in Sadat Valley, Bamyan Province, Afghanistan.

== See also ==
- Bamyan Province
