= Barik Juy =

Barik Juy باریک جوی
- Location in Afghanistan
- Coordinates: 34°05′N 67°45′E
- Country: Afghanistan
- Province: Bamyan
- Time zone: + 4.30

Barik Juy (Persian: باریک جوی) is a village in Bamyan Province in northern-central Afghanistan.

== See also ==
- Bamyan Province
