= Yakah Darakht =

Yakah Darakht یکه درخت Yakadarakht
- Village
- Interactive map of Yakah Darakht
- Coordinates: 34°37′55″N 69°20′58″E
- Country: Afghanistan
- Province: Kabul Province
- Time zone: + 4.30

Yakah Darakht (Arabic: یکه درخت), also known as Yakadarakht (Arabic: يكدرخت), is a village in Kabul Province, in central-eastern Afghanistan.

== See also ==
- Kabul Province
