= Aranji =

Village in Afghanistan

- Location in Afghanistan
- Coordinates: 37°17′51″N 66°31′2″E
- Country: Afghanistan
- Province: Balkh Province
- Time zone: + 4.30

Aranji is a village in Balkh Province in northern Afghanistan.

== See also ==
- Balkh Province
