= Chap Qowlak =

Chap Qowlak چپ قولک
- Location in Afghanistan
- Coordinates: 34°43′N 67°49′E
- Country: Afghanistan
- Province: Bamyan
- Time zone: + 4.30

Chap Qowlak (Persian: چپ قولک) is a village in Bamyan Province in northern-central Afghanistan.

== See also ==
- Bamyan Province
