= Madud =

Madud مدود Madūd
- Location in Afghanistan
- Coordinates: 38°6′22″N 70°54′40″E
- Country: Afghanistan
- Province: Badakhshan Province
- District: Maimay
- Time zone: + 4.30

Madud مدود is a village in Badakhshan Province in north-eastern Afghanistan.
