= Shah Anjir =

- Location in Afghanistan
- Coordinates: 36°21′0″N 67°13′59″E
- Country: Afghanistan
- Province: Balkh Province
- Time zone: + 4.30

Shah Anjir is a village in Balkh Province in northern Afghanistan.

== See also ==
- Balkh Province
