= Golzar Kalay =

Golzar Kalay ګلزار کلی
- Location in Afghanistan
- Coordinates: 32°55′20″N 67°8′11″E
- Country: Afghanistan
- Province: Zabul Province
- Elevation: 8,041 ft (2,451 m)
- Time zone: UTC+4:30

Golzar Kalay (Pashto: ګلزار کلی) (also Gulzar Kalay) is a village of Zabul Province, Afghanistan. It is located at 32.9222°N 67.1364°E with an altitude of 2451m.

== See also ==
- Zabul Province
