= Barigah =

Barigah بریگاه
- Location in Afghanistan
- Coordinates: 34°08′N 67°35′E
- Country: Afghanistan
- Province: Bamyan
- Time zone: + 4.30

Barigah (Persian: بریگاه) is a village in Bamyan Province in northern-central Afghanistan.

== See also ==
- Bamyan Province
