= Abtu, Afghanistan =

Abtu ابتو
- Location in Afghanistan
- Coordinates: 34°52′N 67°31′E
- Country: Afghanistan
- Province: Bamyan
- Time zone: + 4.30

Abtu (Persian: ابتو) is a village in Bamyan Province in northern-central Afghanistan.

== See also ==
- Bamyan Province
