= Arg-e Zari =

Arg-e Zari ارگ زری
- Location in Afghanistan
- Coordinates: 34°40′N 66°53′E
- Country: Afghanistan
- Province: Bamyan
- Time zone: + 4.30

Arg-e Zari (Persian: ارگ زری) is a village in Bamyan Province in northern-central Afghanistan.

== See also ==
- Bamyan Province
