= Keshendeh-ye Bala =

- Location in Afghanistan
- Coordinates: 36°7′13″N 67°0′43″E
- Country: Afghanistan
- Province: Balkh Province
- Time zone: + 4.30

Keshendeh-ye Bala is a village in Balkh Province in northern Afghanistan.

== See also ==
- Balkh Province
