= Band-e Sheram =

- Location in Afghanistan
- Coordinates: 36°08′N 67°05′E
- Country: Afghanistan
- Province: Balkh Province
- Time zone: + 4.30

Band-e Sheram is a village in Balkh Province in northern Afghanistan.

== See also ==
- Balkh Province
