= Bay Saqal =

- Location in Afghanistan
- Coordinates: 36°14′16″N 68°32′43″E
- Country: Afghanistan
- Province: Baghlan Province
- Time zone: + 4.30

Bay Saqal is a village in Baghlan Province in north eastern Afghanistan.

== See also ==
- Baghlan Province
