= Maymey =

Maymey Māymey
- Location in Afghanistan
- Coordinates: 38°24′34″N 71°2′19″E
- Country: Afghanistan
- Province: Badakhshan Province
- Time zone: + 4.30

Maymey is a village in Badakhshan Province in north-eastern Afghanistan.

== See also ==
- Badakhshan Province
