= Sholoktu =

- Location in Afghanistan
- Coordinates: 35°45′22″N 68°31′51″E
- Country: Afghanistan
- Province: Baghlan Province
- Time zone: + 4.30

Sholoktu is a village in Baghlan Province in north eastern Afghanistan.

== See also ==
- Baghlan Province
