= Anvah-ye Kalan =

Anvah-ye Kalan انوه کلان
- Location in Afghanistan
- Coordinates: 34°59′N 67°56′E
- Country: Afghanistan
- Province: Bamyan
- Time zone: + 4.30

Anvah-ye Kalan (Persian: انوه کلان) was a village in Bamyan Province in northern-central Afghanistan, it was destroyed by fighting between the Taliban and NATO troops and is now uninhabited.

== See also ==
- Bamyan Province
