= De Loy Wiyaleh Kelay =

Village in Helmand Province, Afghanistan

Dê Lōy Wiyālêh Kêlay د لوی ویاله کلی Naz̧ar Muḩammad Khān Kêlay (نظر محمد خان کلی)
- Village
- Interactive map of Dê Lōy Wiyālêh Kêlay
- Coordinates: 30°35′46″N 64°0′27″E
- Country: Afghanistan
- Province: Helmand Province
- Time zone: + 4.30

Dê Lōy Wiyālêh Kêlay (Persian: د لوی ویاله کلی) or Naz̧ar Muḩammad Khān Kêlay (Persian: نظر محمد خان کلی) is a village in Helmand Province, in southwestern Afghanistan.

== See also ==
- Helmand Province
