= Gardan Deh =

Village in Bamyan Province, Afghanistan

- Location in Afghanistan
- Coordinates: 34°7′N 67°36′E
- Country: Afghanistan
- Province: Bamyan Province
- Time zone: + 4.30

Gardan Deh is a village in Bamyan Province in central Afghanistan.

== See also ==
- Bamyan Province
