= Darreh-ye Suf =

- Location in Afghanistan
- Coordinates: 35°56′3″N 67°10′48″E
- Country: Afghanistan
- Province: Balkh Province
- Time zone: + 4.30

Darreh-ye Suf is a village in Balkh Province in northern Afghanistan.

== See also ==
- Balkh Province
