= Khashpak =

Khashpak Khashpāk
- Location in Afghanistan
- Coordinates: 36°39′48″N 71°29′15″E
- Country: Afghanistan
- Province: Badakhshan Province
- District: Ishkashim
- Time zone: + 4.30

Khashpak is a village in Badakhshan Province in north-eastern Afghanistan.
