= Juy-ye ʽArab =

Juy-ye ʽArab جوی عرب
- Village
- Location in Afghanistan
- Coordinates: 37°0′10″N 66°48′2″E
- Country: Afghanistan
- Province: Balkh Province
- Time zone: + 4.30

Juy-ye ʽArab (جوی عرب) is a village in Balkh Province in northern Afghanistan.

== See also ==
- Balkh Province
