= Suduj =

- Location in Afghanistan
- Coordinates: 37°41′0″N 71°31′0″E
- Country: Afghanistan
- Province: Badakhshan Province
- Time zone: + 4.30

Suduj is a village in Badakhshan Province in north-eastern Afghanistan.

It is located on the border with Tajikistan.

== See also ==
- Badakhshan Province
