= Khombok =

- Location in Afghanistan
- Coordinates: 36°27′37″N 70°19′53″E
- Country: Afghanistan
- Province: Badakhshan Province
- District: Tagab
- Time zone: + 4.30

Khombok is a village in Badakhshan Province in north-eastern Afghanistan. It lies north of the Koh-i-Sar-i-Ushongen.
