= Ghandak =

Ghandak مردم غندک‌ یکی از بومیان اصلی ولایت بامیان می‌باشد که ملیت آنها تاجیک است
- Nickname: Gheyasi غوث الاحمد "غیاثی" GHANDAK BAMYAN AFGHANISTAN
- Motto: Afghan
- Location in Afghanistan
- Coordinates: 34°59′N 68°0′E
- Country: Afghanistan
- Province: Bamyan Province
- Time zone: + 4.30

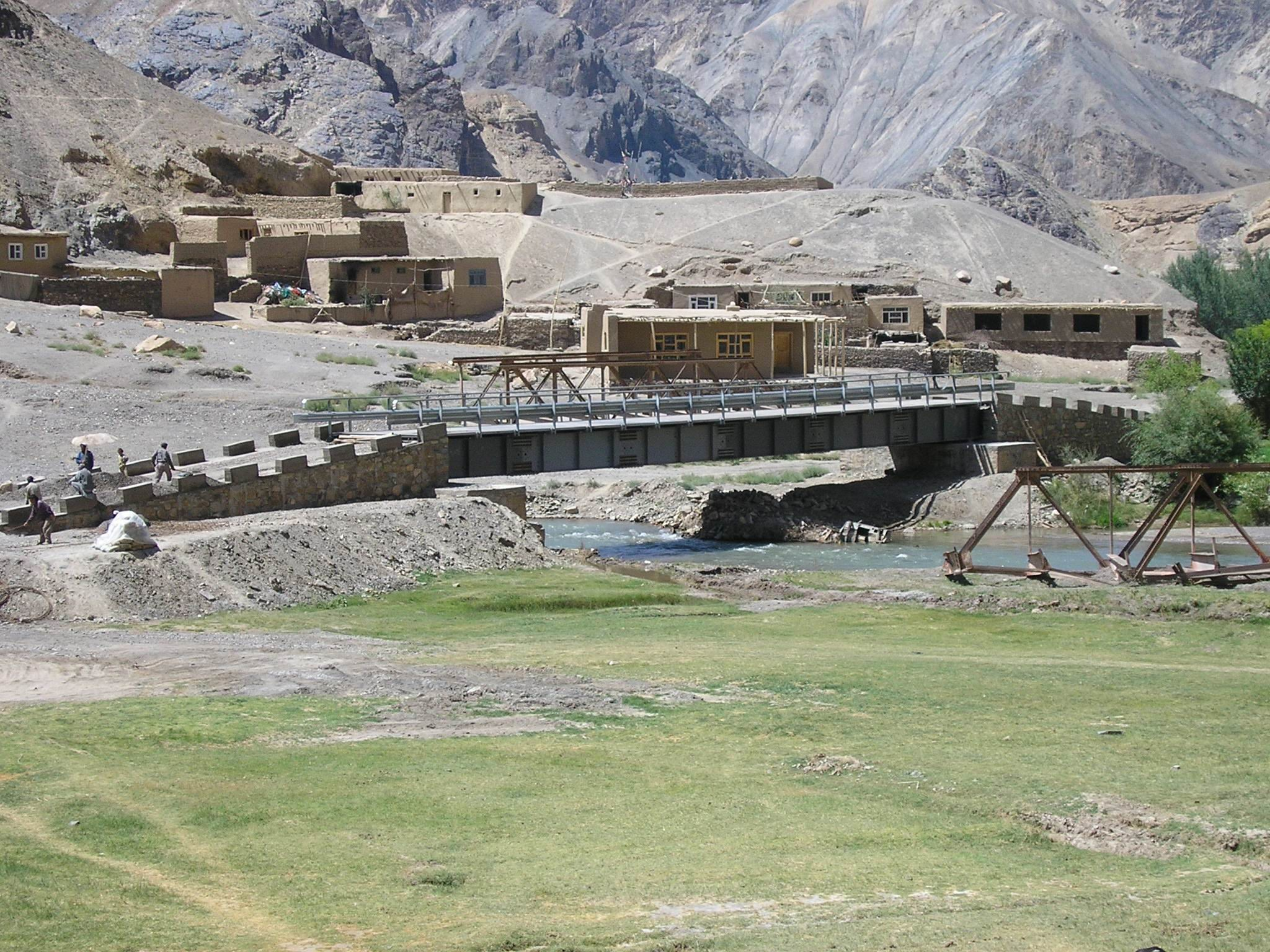
USAID constructed a bridge in Ghandak

Ghandak is a village in Bamyan Province in central Afghanistan.

== See also ==
- Bamyan Province
