= Kashkandyow =

- Location in Afghanistan
- Coordinates: 36°49′25″N 72°5′7″E
- Country: Afghanistan
- Province: Badakhshan Province
- District: Wakhan
- Time zone: + 4.30

Kashkandyow is a village in Wakhan District, Badakhshan Province in north-eastern Afghanistan.
