= Zin, Afghanistan =

Zin
- Location in Afghanistan
- Coordinates: 38°20′15″N 70°52′23″E
- Country: Afghanistan
- Province: Badakhshan Province
- Time zone: +4.30

Zin is a village in Badakhshan Province in northeastern Afghanistan.

== See also ==
- Badakhshan Province
