= Bowz Arigh =

- Location in Afghanistan
- Coordinates: 37°19′6″N 66°40′18″E
- Country: Afghanistan
- Province: Balkh Province
- Time zone: + 4.30

Bowz Arigh is a village in Balkh Province in northern Afghanistan.

== See also ==
- Balkh Province
