= De Mulla Samandar Sahib Kelay =

Dê Mullā Samanḏar Şāḩib Kêlay د ملا سمنډر صاحب کلی Mollā Samand
- Village
- Interactive map of Dê Mullā Samanḏar Şāḩib Kêlay
- Coordinates: 32°35′6″N 68°19′47″E
- Country: Afghanistan
- Province: Paktika Province
- Time zone: + 4.30

Dê Mullā Samanḏar Şāḩib Kêlay (Pashto: د ملا سمنډر صاحب کلی) or Mollā Samand is a village in Paktika Province, in eastern Afghanistan.

== See also ==
- Paktika Province
