= Khar Bid =

- Location in Afghanistan
- Coordinates: 34°46′51″N 64°23′29″E
- Country: Afghanistan
- Province: Badghis Province
- Time zone: + 4.30

Khar Bid is a village in Badghis Province in north western Afghanistan.
