= Bala Duri-ye Dovvom =

- Location in Afghanistan
- Coordinates: 36°2′40″N 68°40′22″E
- Country: Afghanistan
- Province: Baghlan Province
- Time zone: + 4.30

Bala Duri-ye Dovvom is a village in Baghlan Province in north eastern Afghanistan.

It is located on a river south of Baghlan city.

== See also ==
- Baghlan Province
