= Yasif =

- Location in Afghanistan
- Coordinates: 37°34′39″N 70°24′34″E
- Country: Afghanistan
- Province: Badakhshan Province
- Time zone: + 4.30

Yasif is a village in Badakhshan Province in north-eastern Afghanistan.

== See also ==
- Badakhshan Province
