= Bawshi, Balkh =

Bawshi
- Location in Afghanistan
- Coordinates: 35°43′48″N 67°05′53″E
- Country: Afghanistan
- Province: Balkh Province
- Time zone: + 4.30

Bawshi is a village in Balkh Province in northern Afghanistan.

== See also ==
- Balkh Province
