= Owghlan =

- Location in Afghanistan
- Coordinates: 36°22′47″N 66°53′45″E
- Country: Afghanistan
- Province: Balkh Province
- Time zone: + 4.30

Owghlan is a village in Balkh Province in northern Afghanistan.

== See also ==
- Balkh Province
