= Qalʽeh-ye Vali =

- Location in Afghanistan
- Coordinates: 35°46′41″N 63°45′32″E
- Country: Afghanistan
- Province: Badghis Province
- Time zone: + 4.30

Qalʽeh-ye Vali is a village in Badghis Province in north western Afghanistan.
