= Gowritik =

Gowritik Gowrītīk
- Location in Afghanistan
- Coordinates: 37°3′0″N 74°8′0″E
- Country: Afghanistan
- Province: Badakhshan Province
- District: Wakhan
- Time zone: + 4.30

Gowritik is a village in Badakhshan Province in north-eastern Afghanistan.
