= Yardar =

- Location in Afghanistan
- Coordinates: 36°58′0″N 70°56′57″E
- Country: Afghanistan
- Province: Badakhshan Province
- Time zone: + 4.30

Yardar is a village in Badakhshan Province in north-eastern Afghanistan.

== See also ==
- Badakhshan Province
