= Shirabad, Afghanistan =

Shirabad, Afghanistan شیرآباد
- Location in Afghanistan
- Coordinates: 36°40′56″N 67°1′49″E
- Country: Afghanistan
- Province: Balkh Province
- Time zone: + 4.30

Shirabad (Pashto/Dari: شیرآباد) is a village in Balkh Province in northern Afghanistan.

== See also ==
- Balkh Province
