= Kham-e Ganak =

- Location in Afghanistan
- Coordinates: 34°50′N 67°46′E
- Country: Afghanistan
- Province: Bamyan Province
- Time zone: + 4.30

Kham-e Ganak is a village in Bamyan Province in central Afghanistan.

== See also ==
- Hazarajat
