= Imam Rabat =

Imām Rabāţ امام رباط
- Village
- Interactive map of Imām Rabāţ
- Coordinates: 32°52′01″N 64°41′47″E
- Country: Afghanistan
- Province: Helmand Province
- Time zone: + 4.30

Imām Rabāţ (Persian: امام رباط), sometimes called Imamrabat, is a village in Helmand Province, in southwestern Afghanistan.

== See also ==
- Helmand Province
