= Dowra'id =

- Location in Afghanistan
- Coordinates: 34°59′N 67°56′E
- Country: Afghanistan
- Province: Bamyan Province
- Time zone: + 4.30

Dowra'id is a village in Bamyan Province in central Afghanistan.

== See also ==
- Bamyan Province
