= Darmadar =

Darmadar Dārmadār
- Location in Afghanistan
- Coordinates: 37°12′0″N 71°25′0″E
- Country: Afghanistan
- Province: Badakhshan Province
- District: Ishkashim
- Time zone: + 4.30

Darmadar is a village in Badakhshan Province in north-eastern Afghanistan.
