= Babula'i =

- Location in Afghanistan
- Coordinates: 35°19′7″N 62°57′10″E
- Country: Afghanistan
- Province: Badghis Province
- Time zone: + 4.30

Babula'i is a village in Badghis Province in north western Afghanistan.
