= Keshendeh-ye Pa'in =

- Location in Afghanistan
- Coordinates: 36°9′7″N 66°55′22″E
- Country: Afghanistan
- Province: Balkh Province
- Time zone: + 4.30

Keshendeh-ye Pa'in is a village in Balkh Province in northern Afghanistan.
