= Istowi =

Village in Farah Province, Afghanistan

Istowī استوی
- Village
- Interactive map of Istowī
- Coordinates: 33°8′57″N 63°55′42″E
- Country: Afghanistan
- Province: Farah Province
- Time zone: + 4.30

Istowī (Pashto: استوی) is a village in Farah Province, in western Afghanistan.
