= Jang ʽAli =

Jang ʽAli جنگ آغلی Jang Aghli
- Location in Afghanistan
- Coordinates: 35°59′40″N 68°26′23″E
- Country: Afghanistan
- Province: Baghlan Province

Government
- Time zone: + 4.30

Jang ʽAli (جنگ‌علی) is a village in Baghlan Province in north eastern Afghanistan.

== See also ==
- Baghlan Province
