= Baryavan =

Baryavan Baryāvān
- Location in Afghanistan
- Coordinates: 37°32′00″N 70°27′21″E
- Country: Afghanistan
- Province: Badakhshan Province
- District: Yawan
- Time zone: + 4.30

Baryavan is a village in Badakhshan Province in north-eastern Afghanistan.
