= Ushkan =

- Location in Afghanistan
- Coordinates: 36°57′40″N 70°58′47″E
- Country: Afghanistan
- Province: Badakhshan Province
- Time zone: + 4.30

Ushkan is a village in Badakhshan Province in north-eastern Afghanistan.
