= Ab Bala =

Ab Bala آب بالا
- Location in Afghanistan
- Coordinates: 34°43′N 67°44′E
- Country: Afghanistan
- Province: Bamyan
- Time zone: + 4.30

Ab Bala (Persian: آب بالا) is a village in Bamyan Province in northern-central Afghanistan.
