= Warg, Afghanistan =

Warg ورگ
- Village
- Interactive map of Warg
- Coordinates: 33°0′28″N 63°46′45″E
- Country: Afghanistan
- Province: Farah Province
- Time zone: + 4.30

Warg (Pashto: ورگ) is a village in Farah Province, in western Afghanistan.
