= Qala Wust =

- village
- Interactive map of Qala Wust
- Location in Afghanistan
- Coordinates: 36°58′19″N 72°50′48″E
- Country: Afghanistan
- Province: Badakhshan Province
- Time zone: + 4.30

Qala Wust (name variants: Kala Wust, Ūst, Qal‘ah-ye Ūst (BGN standard), Qal‘a-i-Ūst, Qala Ust, Qala Yost, Qal‘eh-ye Vost) is a mountain village in the Wakhan region of the Badakhshan Province, north-eastern Afghanistan.

Qala Wust is a settlement of Tajik highlanders.

The village gave names to the Qala Wust Valley, Qala Wust Gneiss formation, and made a former name (Koh-i Qala-i Ust; koh-i means "mountain of") of the Kohanha massif.
