= Yakh Karez =

Village in Kandahar Province, Afghanistan

Yakh Kārēz یخ کارز
- Village
- Interactive map of Yakh Kārēz
- Coordinates: 31°36′8″N 65°42′34″E
- Country: Afghanistan
- Province: Kandahar Province
- Time zone: + 4.30

Yakh Kārēz (Pashto: یخ کارز) is a village in Kandahar Province, in southern Afghanistan. It is also called Yakh Kāṟēz, Yakh Kārīz, Yaw Kariz (Pashto: یو کاریز).
