= Tall-e Mir Ghazi =

- Location in Afghanistan
- Coordinates: 35°45′38″N 69°18′47″E
- Country: Afghanistan
- Province: Baghlan Province
- Time zone: + 4.30

Tall-e Mir Ghazi is a village in Baghlan Province in north eastern Afghanistan.

== See also ==
- Baghlan Province
