= Bakharow =

Bakharow باخرو Bākharow
- Location in Afghanistan
- Coordinates: 37°58′37″N 70°37′43″E
- Country: Afghanistan
- Province: Badakhshan Province
- District: Kuf Ab
- Time zone: + 4.30

Bakharow باخرو is a village in Badakhshan Province in north-eastern Afghanistan. Bakharow has an elevation of 2,467 metres.
