= Khvosh Asia =

- Location in Afghanistan
- Coordinates: 34°58′2″N 62°20′48″E
- Country: Afghanistan
- Province: Badghis Province
- Time zone: + 4.30

Khvosh Asia is a village in Badghis Province in north western Afghanistan.
