= Deh-e Salah =

- Location in Afghanistan
- Coordinates: 35°41′21″N 69°18′51″E
- Country: Afghanistan
- Province: Baghlan Province
- Time zone: + 4.30

Deh-e Salah is a village in Baghlan Province in north eastern Afghanistan.

== See also ==
- Baghlan Province
