= Baybul =

- Location in Afghanistan
- Coordinates: 35°43′14″N 66°51′34″E
- Country: Afghanistan
- Province: Balkh Province
- Time zone: + 4.30

Baybul is a village in Balkh Province in northern Afghanistan.

== See also ==
- Balkh Province
