= Bolowleh =

Bolowleh بلوله
- Location in Afghanistan
- Coordinates: 34°53′N 68°5′E
- Country: Afghanistan
- Province: Bamyan
- Time zone: + 4.30

Bolowleh or Bulola (Persian: بلوله) is a village in Bamyan Province in northern-central Afghanistan.

== See also ==
- Bamyan Province
