= Dudgah =

Dudgah Dūdgāh
- Location in Afghanistan
- Coordinates: 36°45′49″N 70°22′52″E
- Country: Afghanistan
- Province: Badakhshan Province
- District: Tishkan
- Time zone: + 4.30

Dudgah is a village in Badakhshan Province in north-eastern Afghanistan, about 20 miles east of Keshem.
