= Khevaj =

Khevaj Khevāj
- Location in Afghanistan
- Coordinates: 38°13′28″N 71°0′41″E
- Country: Afghanistan
- Province: Badakhshan Province
- District: Maimay
- Time zone: + 4.30

Khevaj is a village in Badakhshan Province in north-eastern Afghanistan.
