= Biraneh =

Biraneh بیرانه
- Location in Afghanistan
- Coordinates: 34°46′N 68°6′E
- Country: Afghanistan
- Province: Bamyan
- Time zone: + 4.30

Biraneh (Persian: بیرانه) is a village in Bamyan Province in northern-central Afghanistan.

== See also ==
- Bamyan Province
