= Sanglich =

Village in Afghanistan

- Location in Afghanistan
- Coordinates: 36°18′4″N 71°11′19″E
- Country: Afghanistan
- Province: Badakhshan Province
- Time zone: + 4.30

Sanglich is a village in Badakhshan Province in north-eastern Afghanistan.

== See also ==
- Badakhshan Province
