= Parvareh =

- Location in Afghanistan
- Coordinates: 36°7′40″N 70°45′51″E
- Country: Afghanistan
- Province: Badakhshan Province
- Time zone: + 4.30

Parvareh is a village in Badakhshan Province in northeastern Afghanistan.

== See also ==
- Badakhshan Province
