= Waghjan =

Waghjān bazar واغجان بازار
- Village
- Interactive map of Waghjān bazar
- Coordinates: 34.15919°N 69.07096°E
- Country: Afghanistan
- Province: Logar Province
- Time zone: + 4.30

Waghjān bazar (Pashto: واغجان بازار) (alternatively Vagdzhan or Vaghjān) is a village in Logar Province, in eastern Afghanistan.
