= Ab Mazar =

Āb Mazār آب مزار
- Village
- Location in Afghanistan
- Coordinates: 34°57′28″N 61°32′19″E
- Country: Afghanistan
- Province: Herat Province
- Time zone: + 4.30

Āb Mazār (Arabic: آب مزار, alternatively Ao Masar, Aō Mazār) is a village in Herat Province, in northwestern Afghanistan.

== See also ==
- Herat Province
