= Shurab, Afghanistan =

Shurab
- Location in Afghanistan
- Coordinates: 36°34′37″N 67°13′31″E
- Country: Afghanistan
- Province: Balkh Province
- Time zone: + 4.30

Shurab (Persian: شوراب, also Romanized as Shūrāb, Showrab, and Shorab; Russian: Шораб) is a town in Balkh Province, Afghanistan.

== See also ==
- Balkh Province
