= Aq Robat =

Aq Robat اقرباط
- Location in Afghanistan
- Coordinates: 34°56′N 67°39′E
- Country: Afghanistan
- Province: Bamyan
- Time zone: + 4.30

Aq Robat (Persian: اقرباط) is a village in Bamyan Province in northern-central Afghanistan.

== See also ==
- Bamyan Province
