= Div Khaneh-ye Bala =

- Location in Afghanistan
- Coordinates: 34°49′11″N 67°10′11″E
- Country: Afghanistan
- Province: Bamyan Province
- Time zone: + 4.30

Div Khaneh-ye Bala is a village in Bamyan Province in central Afghanistan.

== See also ==
- Bamyan Province
