= Wali, Afghanistan =

Village in Kandahar Province, Afghanistan

Wālī والی
- Village
- Interactive map of Wālī
- Coordinates: 32°19′24″N 66°11′0″E
- Country: Afghanistan
- Province: Kandahar Province
- Time zone: + 4.30

Wālī (Pashto: والی, alternatively Balel, Balil, Vali) is a village in Kandahar Province, in southern Afghanistan.

== See also ==
- Kandahar Province
