= Mah-e Now =

Mah-e Now Māh-e Now
- Location in Afghanistan
- Coordinates: 38°24′2″N 70°41′34″E
- Country: Afghanistan
- Province: Badakhshan Province
- District: Shekay
- Time zone: + 4.30

Mah-e Now is a village in Badakhshan Province in north-eastern Afghanistan.
