= Bolagh Tughaneh =

Bolagh Tughaneh بلاغ توخانه
- Location in Afghanistan
- Coordinates: 34°7′N 67°39′E
- Country: Afghanistan
- Province: Bamyan
- Time zone: + 4.30

Bolagh Tughaneh (Persian: بلاغ توخانه) is a village in Bamyan Province in northern-central Afghanistan.

== See also ==
- Bamyan Province
