= Band-e Shuy =

Band-e Shuy بند شوی
- Location in Afghanistan
- Coordinates: 34°23′N 67°26′E
- Country: Afghanistan
- Province: Bamyan
- Time zone: + 4.30

Band-e Shuy (Persian: بند شوی) is a village in the Bamyan Province in north-central Afghanistan.

== See also ==
- Bamyan Province
