= Tash Gozar =

- Location in Afghanistan
- Coordinates: 37°14′23″N 67°12′20″E
- Country: Afghanistan
- Province: Balkh Province
- Time zone: + 4.30

Tash Gozar is a village in Balkh Province in northern Afghanistan Languages spoken are Dari and Uzbek .

== See also ==
- Balkh Province
