= Urup, Afghanistan =

Urup
- Location in Afghanistan
- Coordinates: 36°46′32″N 71°59′17″E
- Country: Afghanistan
- Province: Badakhshan Province
- Time zone: + 4.30

Urup is a village in Badakhshan Province in north-eastern Afghanistan.

== See also ==
- Badakhshan Province
