= Gawaki, Badakhshan =

Gawaki Gāwaki
- Location in Afghanistan
- Coordinates: 36°59′2″N 70°17′37″E
- Country: Afghanistan
- Province: Badakhshan Province
- District: Darayim
- Time zone: + 4.30

Gawaki is a village in Badakhshan Province in north-eastern Afghanistan.
