= Dahan-e Dival =

- Location in Afghanistan
- Coordinates: 34°27′N 67°35′E
- Country: Afghanistan
- Province: Bamyan Province
- Time zone: + 4.30

Dahan-e Dival is a village in Bamyan Province in northern-central Afghanistan.

== See also ==
- Bamyan Province
