= Chasnud-e ʽOlya =

Chasnud-e ʽOlya Chāsnūd-e ʽOlyā
- Location in Afghanistan
- Coordinates: 37°46′0″N 71°32′0″E
- Country: Afghanistan
- Province: Badakhshan Province
- District: Shighnan
- Time zone: + 4.30

Chasnud-e ʽOlya is a village in Badakhshan Province in north-eastern Afghanistan.
