= Mirkan =

- Location in Afghanistan
- Coordinates: 36°28′12″N 70°10′53″E
- Country: Afghanistan
- Province: Badakhshan Province
- Time zone: + 4.30

Mirkan is a town in Badakhshan Province in north-eastern Afghanistan.

Nearby towns and villages include Ambadara (0.8 miles), Sabz Darreh (2.2 miles), Robat (3.7 miles) and Bakhtingan (7.0 miles).

== See also ==
- Badakhshan Province
