= Farghamiru =

Farghamiru Farghāmīrū
- Location in Afghanistan
- Coordinates: 36°44′52″N 70°49′32″E
- Country: Afghanistan
- Province: Badakhshan Province
- District: Jurm
- Time zone: + 4.30

Farghamiru is a village in Badakhshan Province in north-eastern Afghanistan., south of Jurm on the Kokcha River.=
