= Sandal, Afghanistan =

Sandal
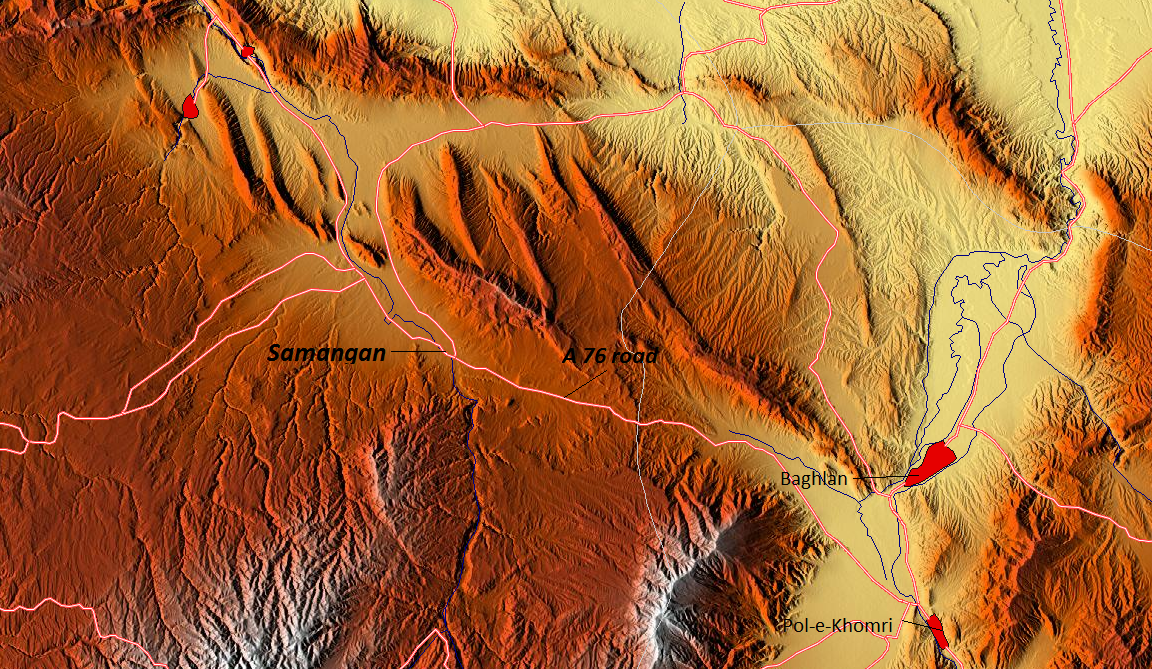

- Location in Afghanistan
- Coordinates: 36°07′08″N 67°19′42″E
- Country: Afghanistan
- Time zone: UTC+4:30

Sandal is a town in Afghanistan. It has a population of about 2,700.

== See also ==
- Samangan Province
