= Eshmorgh =

- Location in Afghanistan
- Coordinates: 36°58′53″N 72°24′40″E
- Country: Afghanistan
- Province: Badakhshan Province
- District: Wakhan
- Time zone: + 4.30

Eshmorgh is a village in Badakhshan Province in north-eastern Afghanistan.
