= Kar-Mulla =

- Village
- Location in Afghanistan
- Coordinates: 31°53′24″N 65°54′0″E
- Country: Afghanistan
- Province: Kandahar Province
- District: Kandahar District

Kar Mulla (Pashto: کار ملا) is a small agricultural village in Kandahar Province, Afghanistan. It is located north of Kandahar District. Kar Mulla lies on a small lake.

== See also ==
- Kandahar Province
