= Qalʽeh-ye Nowak =

- Location in Afghanistan
- Coordinates: 34°54′35″N 62°27′0″E
- Country: Afghanistan
- Province: Badghis Province
- Time zone: + 4.30

Qalʽeh-ye Nowak is a village in Badghis Province in north western Afghanistan.
