= Dahan-e Baghdarreh =

- Location in Afghanistan
- Coordinates: 35°36′28″N 69°26′49″E
- Country: Afghanistan
- Province: Baghlan Province
- Elevation: 6,519 ft (1,987 m)
- Time zone: + 4.30

Dahan-e Baghdarreh is a village in Baghlan Province in northeastern Afghanistan.

== See also ==
- Baghlan Province
