= Onab =

- Location in Afghanistan
- Coordinates: 37°1′4″N 70°8′24″E
- Country: Afghanistan
- Province: Badakhshan Province
- Time zone: + 4.30

Onab is a village in Badakhshan Province in northeastern Afghanistan.

== See also ==
- Badakhshan Province
