= Darmarakh =

Darmarakh Darmārakh
- Location in Afghanistan
- Coordinates: 37°20′0″N 71°29′0″E
- Country: Afghanistan
- Province: Badakhshan Province
- District: Shighnan
- Time zone: + 4.30

Darmarakh is a village in Badakhshan Province in north-eastern Afghanistan. Around the turn of the 20th century, there was a village of this name consisting of seven houses, in the Darmarakh valley, located on the right side of the stream running through the valley. Some five miles upstream of the village was another village, Darmarokh Bala. During the winters, when the Ghar Jabin pass became inaccessible due to the snow, this valley was used as an alternate patah for communications in emergencies.
