= Hazar Cheshmeh =

- Location in Afghanistan
- Coordinates: 35°18′4″N 67°0′28″E
- Country: Afghanistan
- Province: Bamyan Province
- Time zone: + 4.30

Hazar Cheshmeh is a village in Bamyan Province in central Afghanistan.

== See also ==
- Bamyan Province
