= Bawrchi =

- Location in Afghanistan
- Coordinates: 36°21′57″N 66°32′19″E
- Country: Afghanistan
- Province: Balkh Province
- Time zone: + 4.30

Bawrchi is a village in Balkh Province in northern Afghanistan.

== See also ==
- Balkh Province
