= Banaq =

Banaq باناق
- Location in Afghanistan
- Coordinates: 35°19′16″N 67°35′33″E
- Country: Afghanistan
- Province: Bamyan
- Time zone: + 4.30

Banaq (Persian: باناق) is a village in Bamyan Province in northern-central Afghanistan.

== See also ==
- Bamyan Province
