= ʽAbbas Koshteh =

`Abbas Koshteh
- Location in Afghanistan
- Coordinates: 34°19′N 67°38′E
- Country: Afghanistan
- Province: Bamyan
- Time zone: + 4.30

`Abbas Koshteh is a village in Bamyan Province in northern-central Afghanistan.

== See also ==
- Bamyan Province
