= Dahan-e Siahqowl =

- Location in Afghanistan
- Coordinates: 35°33′33″N 68°24′39″E
- Country: Afghanistan
- Province: Baghlan Province
- Time zone: + 4.30

Dahan-e Siahqowl is a village in Baghlan Province in north eastern Afghanistan.

== See also ==
- Baghlan Province
