= Khaneh-ye Garmatek =

Khaneh-ye Garmatek Khāneh-ye Garmatek
- Location in Afghanistan
- Coordinates: 37°19′44″N 73°6′5″E
- Country: Afghanistan
- Province: Badakhshan Province
- District: Wakhan
- Time zone: + 4.30

Khaneh-ye Garmatek is a village in Badakhshan Province in north-eastern Afghanistan.
