= Juy Vakil =

- Location in Afghanistan
- Coordinates: 37°22′13″N 66°58′45″E
- Country: Afghanistan
- Province: Balkh Province
- Time zone: + 4.30

Juy Vakil is a village in Balkh Province in northern Afghanistan.

It is located near the border with Uzbekistan.

== See also ==
- Balkh Province
