= Showrak =

- Location in Afghanistan
- Coordinates: 36°51′12″N 67°4′33″E
- Country: Afghanistan
- Province: Balkh Province
- Time zone: + 4.30

Showrak is a village in Balkh Province in northern Afghanistan.

== See also ==
- Balkh Province
