= Char Kateh =

Char Kateh چارکته
- Location in Afghanistan
- Coordinates: 34°50′N 68°7′E
- Country: Afghanistan
- Province: Bamyan
- Time zone: + 4.30

Char Kateh (Persian: چارکته) is a village in Bamyan Province in northern-central Afghanistan.

== See also ==
- Bamyan Province
