= Koshk-e Kohneh =

- Location in Afghanistan
- Coordinates: 34°52′17″N 62°32′54″E
- Country: Afghanistan
- Province: Badghis Province
- Time zone: + 4.30

Koshk-e Kohneh is a village in Badghis Province in north western Afghanistan.
