= Shur Areq =

- Location in Afghanistan
- Coordinates: 37°18′45″N 66°43′28″E
- Country: Afghanistan
- Province: Balkh Province
- Time zone: + 4.30

Shur Areq is a village in Balkh Province in northern Afghanistan.

== See also ==
- Balkh Province
