= Cheshmeh-ye Yanbolaq =

- Location in Afghanistan
- Coordinates: 35°59′45″N 63°56′22″E
- Country: Afghanistan
- Province: Badghis Province
- Time zone: + 4.30

Cheshmeh-ye Yanbolaq is a village in Badghis Province in north western Afghanistan.

It is located on the border with Turkmenistan.

The closest major cities include Herāt, Türkmenabat, Mashhad and Neyshabur.
