= Ghumay =

Ghumay Ghūmay
- Location in Afghanistan
- Coordinates: 38°8′53″N 71°16′57″E
- Country: Afghanistan
- Province: Badakhshan Province
- District: Nusay
- Time zone: + 4.30

Ghumay is a village in Badakhshan Province in north-eastern Afghanistan.
