= Mahajer =

- Location in Afghanistan
- Coordinates: 36°10′38″N 68°46′3″E
- Country: Afghanistan
- Province: Baghlan Province
- Time zone: + 4.30

Mahajer is a village in Baghlan Province in north eastern Afghanistan.

== See also ==
- Baghlan Province
