= Shahr-e Monjan =

- Location in Afghanistan
- Coordinates: 36°1′11″N 70°46′26″E
- Country: Afghanistan
- Province: Badakhshan Province
- Time zone: + 4.30

Shahr-e Monjan is a village in Badakhshan Province in north-eastern Afghanistan.

== See also ==
- Badakhshan Province
