= Dahan-e Eshposhteh =

- Location in Afghanistan
- Coordinates: 35°18′4″N 68°5′4″E
- Country: Afghanistan
- Province: Baghlan Province
- Time zone: + 4.30

Dahan-e Eshposhteh is a village in Baghlan Province in north eastern Afghanistan.

== See also ==
- Baghlan Province
