= Temorak Navarid =

- Location in Afghanistan
- Coordinates: 36°45′50″N 66°32′32″E
- Country: Afghanistan
- Province: Balkh Province
- Time zone: + 4.30

Temorak Navarid is a village in Balkh Province in northern Afghanistan.

== See also ==
- Balkh Province
