= Pa'in Shahr =

- Location in Afghanistan
- Coordinates: 37°3′51″N 70°46′57″E
- Country: Afghanistan
- Province: Badakhshan Province
- Time zone: + 4.30

Pa'in Shahr is a village in Badakhshan Province in north-eastern Afghanistan.

== See also ==
- Badakhshan Province
