= Bidqowl =

Bidqowl بیدقول
- Location in Afghanistan
- Coordinates: 34°6′N 66°49′E
- Country: Afghanistan
- Province: Bamyan
- Time zone: + 4.30

Bidqowl (Persian: بیدقول) is a village in Bamyan Province in northern-central Afghanistan.

== See also ==
- Bamyan Province
