= Ghowch Naveh =

- Location in Afghanistan
- Coordinates: 34°32′N 66°56′E
- Country: Afghanistan
- Province: Bamyan Province
- Time zone: + 4.30

Ghowch Naveh is a village in Bamyan Province very near the center of Afghanistan.

== See also ==
- Bamyan Province
