= Darreh Javay =

- Location in Afghanistan
- Coordinates: 38°14′52″N 70°47′37″E
- Country: Afghanistan
- Province: Badakhshan Province
- District: Maimay
- Time zone: + 4.30

Darreh Javay is a village in Badakhshan Province in north-eastern Afghanistan.
