= Darreh-ye Kajak =

- Location in Afghanistan
- Coordinates: 34°29′N 67°30′E
- Country: Afghanistan
- Province: Bamyan Province
- Time zone: + 4.30

Darreh-ye Kajak is a village in Bamyan Province in northern-central Afghanistan.
