= Vod Ab =

- Location in Afghanistan
- Coordinates: 38°15′15″N 70°55′8″E
- Country: Afghanistan
- Province: Badakhshan Province
- Time zone: + 4.30

Vod Ab is a village in Badakhshan Province in north-eastern Afghanistan.

== See also ==
- Badakhshan Province
