= Gow Darreh =

- Location in Afghanistan
- Coordinates: 34°38′N 68°2′E
- Country: Afghanistan
- Province: Bamyan Province
- Time zone: + 4.30

Gow Darreh is a village in Bamyan Province in central Afghanistan.

== See also ==
- Bamyan Province
