= Baladay =

Village in Afghanistan

- Village
- Location in Afghanistan
- Coordinates: 31°32′51″N 65°43′8″E
- Country: Afghanistan
- Province: Kandahar Province
- Time zone: + 4.30

Baladay (Pashto: بلادي) is a village in Kandahar Province, in southern Afghanistan. The village lies on the open plain south of Kandahar city. To the north is Shir-e Sorkh and to the southeast is Zaker-e Sharif. It contained 54 houses in 1880. Its altitude ranges between 42 and 65 metres. Most of the inhabitants are involved in agriculture, working on fine orchards and vineyards. The villagers obtain their water from the Naoshijan canal.

== See also ==
- Kandahar Province
