= Townj =

- Location in Afghanistan
- Coordinates: 35°53′29″N 66°52′46″E
- Country: Afghanistan
- Province: Balkh Province
- Time zone: + 4.30

Townj is a village in Balkh Province in northern Afghanistan.

== See also ==
- Balkh Province
