= Pashmi Qalʽeh =

- Location in Afghanistan
- Coordinates: 36°40′14″N 66°31′39″E
- Country: Afghanistan
- Province: Balkh Province
- Time zone: + 4.30

Pashmi Qalʽeh is a village in Balkh Province in northern Afghanistan.

== See also ==
- Balkh Province
