= Amrakh =

- Location in Afghanistan
- Coordinates: 35°53′0″N 66°42′0″E
- Country: Afghanistan
- Province: Balkh Province
- Time zone: + 4.30

Amrakh is a village in Balkh Province in northern Afghanistan.

== See also ==
- Balkh Province
