= Eskatul =

Eskatul Eskatūl
- Location in Afghanistan
- Coordinates: 36°24′52″N 71°16′17″E
- Country: Afghanistan
- Province: Badakhshan Province
- District: Zebak
- Time zone: + 4.30

Eskatul is a village in Badakhshan Province in north-eastern Afghanistan.
