= Kal Qal'ah =

Kāl Qal‘ah کال قلعه
- Village
- Location in Afghanistan
- Coordinates: 32°37′45″N 62°31′50″E
- Country: Afghanistan
- Province: Farah Province
- Time zone: + 4.30

Kāl Qal‘ah (Pashto: کال قلعه) is a village in Farah Province, in western Afghanistan.
