= Deh Deraz, Afghanistan =

Deh Deraz
- Location in Afghanistan
- Coordinates: 36°56′18″N 66°40′46″E
- Country: Afghanistan
- Province: Balkh Province
- Time zone: + 4.30

Deh Deraz is a village in Balkh Province in northern Afghanistan.

== See also ==
- Balkh Province
