= Nav, Afghanistan =

Nav
- Location in Afghanistan
- Coordinates: 35°44′25″N 70°45′50″E
- Country: Afghanistan
- Province: Badakhshan Province
- Time zone: + 4.30

Nav is a village located in Badakhshan Province, in north-eastern Afghanistan.

== See also ==
- Badakhshan Province
