= Birimak =

- Location in Afghanistan
- Coordinates: 34°12′N 67°31′E
- Country: Afghanistan
- Province: Bamyan Province
- Time zone: + 4.30

Birimak is a village in Bamyan Province in northern-central Afghanistan.

== See also ==
- Bamyan Province
