= Yakhan-e 'Ulya =

Yakhan-e ‘Ulyā یخن علیا
- Village
- Interactive map of Yakhan-e ‘Ulyā
- Coordinates: 33°32′24″N 64°32′06″E
- Country: Afghanistan
- Province: Ghor Province
- Time zone: + 4.30

Yakhan-e ‘Ulyā (Arabic: یخن علیا) is a village in Ghor Province, in central Afghanistan. Alternate spellings of the name include Yakhān-e ‘Olyā, Yakhān-i-Bāla, and Yakhani-Ulia.

== See also ==
- Ghōr Province
