= Darreh-ye Pishkan =

Darreh-ye Pishkan Darreh-ye Pīshkān
- Location in Afghanistan
- Coordinates: 36°50′31″N 70°47′9″E
- Country: Afghanistan
- Province: Badakhshan Province
- District: Jurm
- Time zone: + 4.30

Darreh-ye Pishkan is a village in Badakhshan Province in north-eastern Afghanistan.
