= Jow Kham =

Jow Kham Jow Khām
- Location in Afghanistan
- Coordinates: 36°33′57″N 70°56′48″E
- Country: Afghanistan
- Province: Badakhshan Province
- District: Yamgan
- Time zone: + 4.30

Jow Kham is a village in Badakhshan Province in north-eastern Afghanistan. The village lies on the banks of a similarly named stream about 10 miles from Eskan.
