= Cham Qalʽeh =

- Location in Afghanistan
- Coordinates: 36°8′19″N 68°44′45″E
- Country: Afghanistan
- Province: Baghlan Province
- Time zone: + 4.30

Cham Qalʽeh is a village in Baghlan Province in north eastern Afghanistan.

== See also ==
- Baghlan Province
