= Peshi Puza =

Village in Afghanistan,

Coordinates: 34°16′02″N 66°16′31″E

Peshi Puza is a village in Afghanistan, midway between Herat and Kabul.

Its mountainous location results in temperature variation from -20 °C to 11 °C with most precipitation in winter. The population is predominantly Hazara.
