= Darreh-ye Navora =

- Location in Afghanistan
- Coordinates: 34°20′N 67°37′E
- Country: Afghanistan
- Province: Bamyan Province
- Time zone: + 4.30

Darreh-ye Navora is a village in Bamyan Province in northern-central Afghanistan.

== See also ==
- Bamyan Province
