= Av Par =

- Location in Afghanistan
- Coordinates: 34°58′N 67°51′E
- Country: Afghanistan
- Province: Bamyan
- Time zone: + 4.30

Av Par is a village in Bamyan Province in northern-central Afghanistan.

== See also ==
- Bamyan Province
