= Jumah Khan Fatih =

Tajik Taliban commander (born 1984 or 1985)

Mawlawi; Mullah; Jumah Khan Fatih
- جمعه‌خان فاتح
- Fatih in 2026

Deputy Governor of Zabul Province
- In office Early 2026 – 22 June 2026
- Governor: Sher Mohammad Sharif
- Succeeded by: Faizullah Tamim

Administrator of Darwaz Districts
- In office 2021–2026

Personal details
- Born: c. 1984 or 1985 Shaakhdara, Nusay District, Badakhshan, Afghanistan
- Party: Taliban (until 2026)
- Relations: Musa Shahriar (brother)
- Education: Nusay High School; Zaghar High School

Military service
- Allegiance: Taliban (until 2026); Fatih loyalists (2026–present)
- Branch/service: Darwaz Regional Forces
- Years of service: 2013–present
- Rank: Commander
- Commands: Taliban Forces in Darwaz (2017–2026); Fatih's armed faction (2026–present)
- Battles/wars: War in Afghanistan (2001–2021): 2020 Nusay and Maimay offensive; Badakhshan conflict (2026) (2026–present): Battle of Nusay (2026)

Jumah Khan Fatih (Dari: جمعه‌خان فاتح, romanized: Jumʿah Khān Fātiḥ; born 1984 or 1985) is a Tajik Taliban commander from Badakhshan. He served as the deputy governor of Zabul Province from early 2026 until his removal in June 2026.

Born in a rural village, after high school he began to work for the HALO Trust, which he left in 2013 before unsuccessfully attempting to assassinate his boss. Fleeing, he joined the Taliban, with which he received military and religious training. He rose to a leadership role and established a network of NDS agents who helped him avoid imprisonment.

Following the re-establishment of Taliban rule in 2021, Fatih was made an administrator in Darwaz by the Taliban government, during which period tensions emerged with the central government over a gold mining dispute and Fatih's coercive approach to administration. Fatih has been accused of persecuting Ismailis and forcing them to convert to Sunni Islam.

In early 2026, he was made deputy governor of Zabul in early 2026, but removed in June of that year due to disputes over the central Taliban leadership's administration of gold mines in Badakhshan. An arrest warrant for Fatih was subsequently declared by the Taliban leadership, leading him to stage demonstrations against the leadership in Nusay District. His armed forces clashed with Taliban's GDI from 12 to 17 August when he surrendered. Taliban spokesperson Zabihullah Mujahid stated that Fatih would be tried in a Taliban court.

== Early life and education ==
Jumah Khan Fatih was born in Shaakhdara, Badakhshan province, Afghanistan in 1984 or 1985 to a poor rural Tajik family. He completed his elementary through 11th grade at Zaghar High School and 12th grade at Nusay High School. During his school year, he worked with his father on the farm and as a shopkeeper in the center of Nusay.

== Early career and hiding ==
Fatih worked for the HALO Trust from 2009 to 2013. Apart from that, he also became a singer, performing and playing tabla at community events. He also got elected as a member of the Shaakhdara village council for one year.

Upon resigning from the HALO Trust demining organization, he planned to kill the HALO Trust boss in Jamarch, Nusay. However, the assassination attempt failed, causing him to flee to Khoi. Afterward, he and his colleagues stole the teacher's salary in Obghan. In 2014, he and several Shaakhdara left the village and sought refuge in the mountains.

== Taliban Insurgency era ==
Fatih joined the Taliban in an unknown year. Upon becoming a member of the Taliban, he went to Wurduj to undergo military and religious training. Upon completing the training, he earned the title of mullah. He then served as the Taliban's commander for Darwaz after the death of his predecessor, Islamuddin, due to the explosion of a homemade mine. As a commander, he was known as a ruthless and eliminated his rivals within the Taliban.

From 2016 to 2018, the Afghan police arrested Fatih and his five subordinates thrice. However, the police released him from all three detentions following mediation by the residents. During his imprisonment, he established a network with NDS agents who helped secure his release from jail.

Fatih commanded the Taliban's attack in Nusay District and Maimay District in 2020. The attack in Maimay caused the Taliban to control the district for two days. The Afghan air force launched an airstrike toward him, and he survived, although it paralyzed his left hand and damaged his eye.

== Second Taliban government era ==
After the Taliban takeover of Afghanistan in 2021, Fatih was appointed as the administrator of five Darwaz districts and called himself "Conqueror of the Darwaz Districts". He gained more influence in Badakhshan after seizing weapons stockpiles from former governments. His influence is further strengthened when Hibatullah Akhundzada appointed him as the commander of anti-poppy cultivation and drug-production facilities operation in Badakhshan in December 2024. He claimed that he commanded 10.000 troops in Badakhshan, Takhar, and Kunduz.

Fatih has a significant economic influence in Darwaz. He gained wealth from land seizures, extortion, and shares of the profits of all local businesses, especially gold mining. He operated gold mining in the Shikai District. he gained more wealth, which he spent on religious institutions, mosques, and luxurious vehicles. He founded madrassas in Shekay, Maimay, Nusay, Kuf, and Khwahan. Other than that, he also played a role in converting Chinese citizens in Badakhshan to Islam.

In 2023, he released a video executing a person whom he accused of rebellion. In the video, he stated that those who rebelled against the Taliban government deserved to die. Later, he said in public gatherings that he would execute his father and brother if they conducted armed rebellion against the government.

In early 2026, his position as administrator of five Darwaz districts was stripped due to a dispute over gold mines and his coercive behavior. Afterward, he was posted to Zabul, where he served as deputy governor. Although he served as Deputy Governor of Zabul, he still retains huge influence in Darwaz. On 22 June 2026, he was dismissed as the Deputy Governor of Zabul and replaced in the position by Faizullah Tamim. On his interview with the BBC, he claimed that he stepped down as a Deputy Governor of Zabul because of language barrier, health issues, and loneliness.

=== Persecution of Ismailis ===
Fatih considered Ismailis as infidels who had no knowledge of religion. Etilaatroz and Rawadari reported that he and his men forced Ismailis to renounce their beliefs and convert to Sunni through coercion, intimidation, financial incentives, land seizure, and promises of employment. The Ismailis who refused to convert to Sunni were subjected to beating, imprisonment, death threats, and even execution. However, he denied the allegation of converting Ismailis to Sunnis by force, claiming that they entered it voluntarily.

According to Rawadari, Fatih ordered Ismaili families in Nusay to send at least one of their children to his madrassa and sent Sunni clerics to the local mosque to facilitate the conversion of Ismailis to Sunnism. The Independent Persian revealed that he also ordered his men to raze the shrine of Ismaili figures in Parkhikh. Through his force conversion effort, there were approximately 100 Ismailis and Shias who converted to Sunni in 2025. According to Etilaatroz, he recruited some of the Ismailis who converted to Sunni as his personal bodyguards as a means of encouraging them to renounce their former beliefs.

=== Tension with the central government ===
The dispute over control of gold mining in Shekay District arose between the locals and the Fatih group. The local accused his group of seizing the gold deposits. Responding to the tension, the Taliban arrested the commander of Nusay, Musa Kaka, who is also part of Fatih's faction, on 20 April 2026. As a result, around 200–300 Fatih troops moved to the mountainous area. Moreover, he ordered local miners and his troops to switch off the mines when the Governor of Badakhshan, Ismail Ghaznawi, visited the mine on night. However, the governor visited the mine during the day and ordered Fateh to pay khums. Afterward, he hid all mining excavators and equipment and removed the tend. Furthermore, the governor ordered to stop the gold mining operation in Badakhshan, leading to tension with the central government. However, he refuted the rumor of tension between him and the central government and the arrest of his men during a speech in Juy Dara on 1 June 2026.

The governor's decision to halt the gold-mining operation led Fatih to facilitate a demonstration by Nusay residents against the suspension. The tension between the Taliban central government and Fatih continued as the negotiations stalled. Hibatullah labeled him a rebel and ordered the arrest of Fatih in Darwaz. In response to the arrest warrant, he and his troops prepared to resist the arrest.

Fatih's forces clashed with the GDI in Nusay on 11 August 2026. The clash resulted in the death of ten Fateh's soldiers.

On 13 August 2026, an Afghan Air Force Mil Mi-17 helicopter was shot down by insurgents loyal to Jumah Khan Fatih while resupplying Afghan forces in Nusay, Darwaz-e Bala District, Badakhshan Province. Some sources claim that there were 7 fatalities, but this is not confirmed.

After six days of fighting, he surrendered to the authorities on 17 August 2026 and his followers laid down their weapons.

On 22 August, Taliban spokesperson Zabihullah Mujahid announced that Fatih would be tried in a Taliban court.

== Personal life ==
Several of his relatives joined the Taliban. His brother, Abdul Fattah, serves as the commander in the Taliban ranks. Haji Mohammad Yasin Khadem, Fatih's maternal uncle, became deputy of the Taliban commissariat in Nusay district.

== Bibliography ==
- Rawadari (December 2025). The Human Rights Situation of Ismaili Shias in Afghanistan (PDF) (Report). Rawadari.
