= Amurn =

Amurn Āmūrn
- Location in Afghanistan
- Coordinates: 38°11′51″N 71°21′10″E
- Country: Afghanistan
- Province: Badakhshan Province
- District: Nusay
- Time zone: + 4.30

Amurn is a village in Darwaz District, Badakhshan Province in north-eastern Afghanistan.

== Geography ==
The village is located near the border with Tajikistan. It lies 1.8 miles from Yeylaq-e Amurn, 3.9 miles from Delvakh, 4.3 miles from Manzel, Afghanistan and 4.7 miles from Ablun, Afghanistan.

== Transport ==
Amurn is located on the M41 motorway which connects it with Tajikistan. The nearest airport is 42 miles away at Khorog.
