= Arakht =

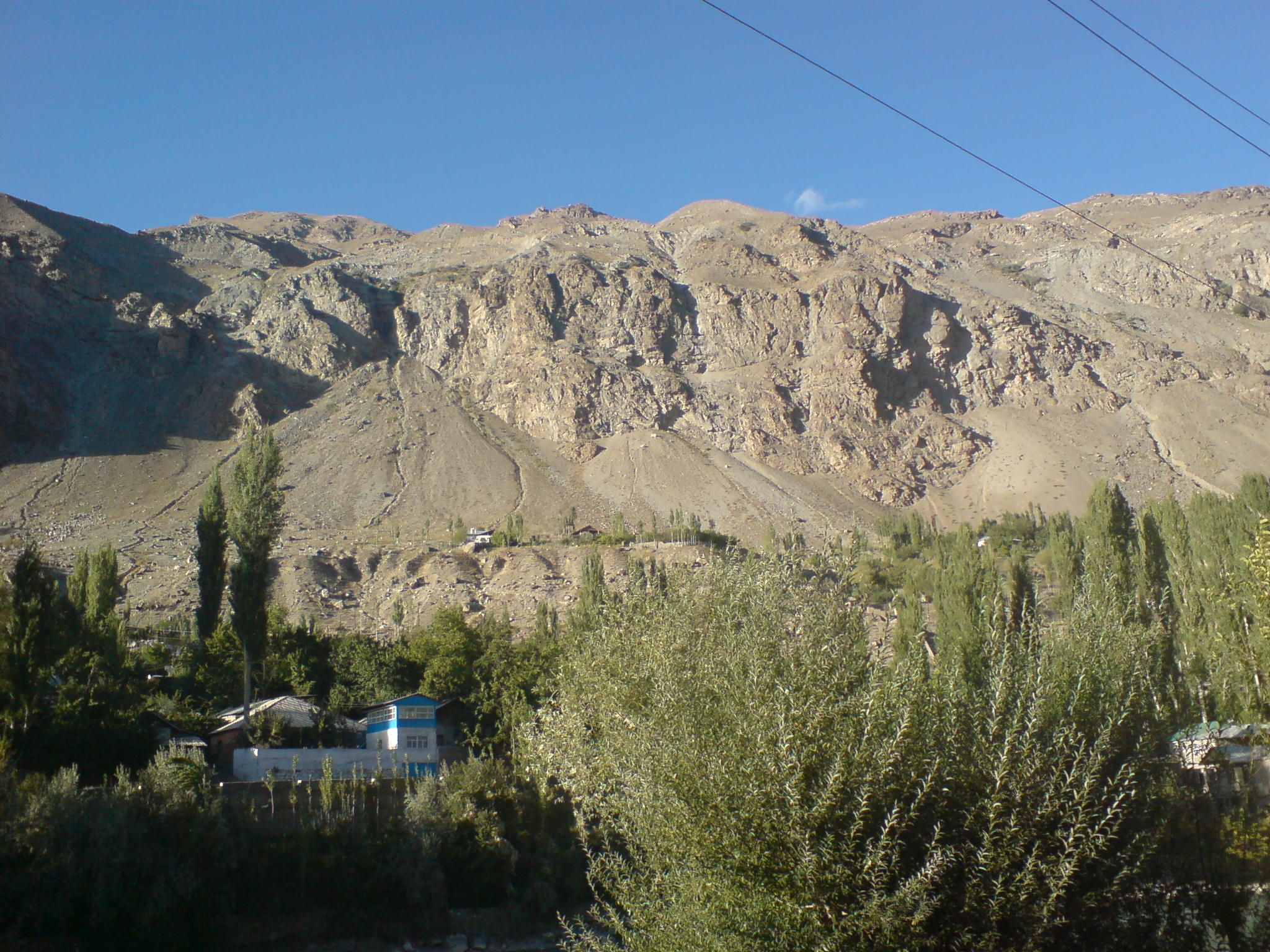
- Typical scenery of the area

- Location in Afghanistan
- Coordinates: 37°22′0″N 71°25′0″E
- Country: Afghanistan
- Province: Badakhshan
- District: Shighnan
- Elevation: 2,652 m (8,701 ft)
- Time zone: + 4.30

Arakht is a village in Badakhshan Province in north-eastern Afghanistan.

It is located between Lake Shiva and the Panj River, at an elevation of 3,100 metres (10,200 ft) near the Tajikistan border. It lies 5.3 kilometres (3.3 mi) from Pish, 4.2 km (2.6 mi) from Wishtayn, 6.1 km (3.8 mi) from Gordzhak and 10.0 km (6.2 mi) from Ghar Javin.

The nearest airport is 14 km (9 mi) away across the border at Khorog.

== Climate ==
Arakht has a subarctic climate (Köppen climate classification: Dsc) with mild, dry summers and very cold, snowy winters.

Climate data for Arakht, Badakhshan Province (2009-present)
Month	Jan	Feb	Mar	Apr	May	Jun	Jul	Aug	Sep	Oct	Nov	Dec	Year
Mean daily maximum °C (°F)	−9 (16)	−7 (19)	−3 (27)	1 (34)	6 (43)	11 (52)	16 (61)	16 (61)	12 (54)	5 (41)	−3 (27)	−8 (18)	3 (38)
Mean daily minimum °C (°F)	−21 (−6)	−19 (−2)	−13 (9)	−8 (18)	−1 (30)	3 (37)	7 (45)	6 (43)	2 (36)	−4 (25)	−11 (12)	−19 (−2)	−6 (20)
Average precipitation mm (inches)	75.5 (2.97)	106.7 (4.20)	123.9 (4.88)	108.2 (4.26)	100.3 (3.95)	67.0 (2.64)	19.5 (0.77)	7.8 (0.31)	14.3 (0.56)	54.9 (2.16)	77.3 (3.04)	60.8 (2.39)	816.2 (32.13)
Average snowfall cm (inches)	71.2 (28.0)	96.5 (38.0)	117.5 (46.3)	99.7 (39.3)	66.4 (26.1)	27.4 (10.8)	0.1 (0.0)	0.4 (0.2)	6.3 (2.5)	50.9 (20.0)	75.7 (29.8)	58.6 (23.1)	670.7 (264.1)
Source: World Weather Online
