= Mizak =

Mizak Mīzak
- Location in Afghanistan
- Coordinates: 38°14′05″N 70°58′40″E
- Country: Afghanistan
- Province: Badakhshan Province
- District: Darwaz
- Elevation: 8,103 ft (2,470 m)
- Time zone: + 4.30

Mizak is a village in Badakhshan Province in north-eastern Afghanistan.

== Geography ==
The village lies towards the northern edge of the Hindu Kush mountain range which crosses over into Pakistan and is at an elevation of 8,103 feet (2,470 m).

Mizak is situated 2.9 miles (4.7 km) away from Magay, 0.4 miles (0.64 km) away from Mina Vad and 0.4 miles (0.64 km) away from Khorodun.

== Transport ==
The nearest airport is 50 miles (80 km) to the north, at Khorog.

== See also ==
- Badakhshan Province
