= Basenj =

Village in Badakhshan Province, Afghanistan

Basenj Basinj
- Location in Afghanistan
- Coordinates: 37°49′10″N 71°05′38″E
- Country: Afghanistan
- Province: Badakhshan Province
- District: Nusay
- Time zone: + 4.30

Basenj also known as Basinj is a village in Badakhshan Province in north-eastern Afghanistan.

On 11 August 2021, Taliban militants reportedly captured the area in addition to capturing the capital of Badakhshan Province; Fayzabad.
