= Mina Vad =

- Location in Afghanistan
- Coordinates: 38°14′26″N 70°58′46″E
- Country: Afghanistan
- Province: Badakhshan Province
- Elevation: 8,428 ft (2,569 m)
- Time zone: + 4.30

Mina Vad is a village in Badakhshan Province in north-eastern Afghanistan.

== Geography ==
The village lies towards the northern edge of the Hindu Kush mountain range which crosses over into Pakistan and is at an elevation of 8,428 feet (2,569 m).

Mina Vad is situated 3 miles (4.8 km) away from Kham-e Vorsa, 3.5 miles (5.6 km) away from Aylaq-i-Wundak, 1.8 miles (2.9 km) away from Khevaj and 0.4 miles (640 m) away from Mizak.

== Transport ==
The nearest airport is 51 miles (82 km) to the north, at Khorog.

== See also ==
- Badakhshan Province
