= Qal'eh-ye Kuf =

Qala-e Kuf قلعه کوف
- Location in Afghanistan
- Coordinates: 38°2′21″N 70°28′37″E
- Country: Afghanistan
- Province: Badakhshan Province
- Darwaz: Darwaz
- District: Kuf Ab
- Time zone: + 4.30

Qalʽeh-ye Kuf or Qala-e Kuf Dari: قلعه کوف is a village and Capital District Kuf Ab in Badakhshan Province in north-eastern Afghanistan.

During the early modern era Qal'eh-ye Kuf was part of the Darwaz kingdom ,a small emirate of the Pamiri people

== See also ==
- Badakhshan Province
