= Maimay District =

Maimay مایمی
- District
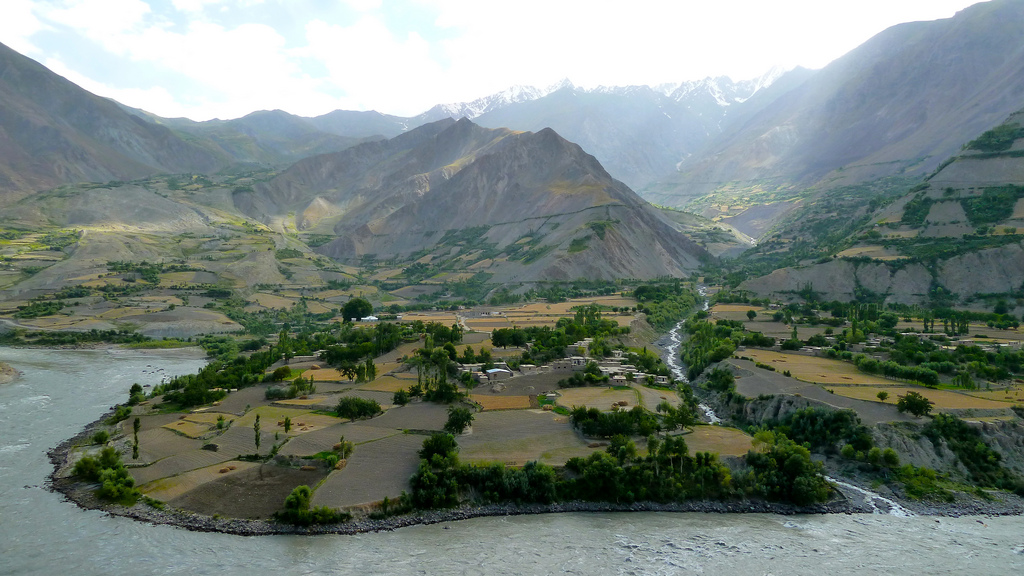
- Jamarj-e Bala, the capital of Maimay

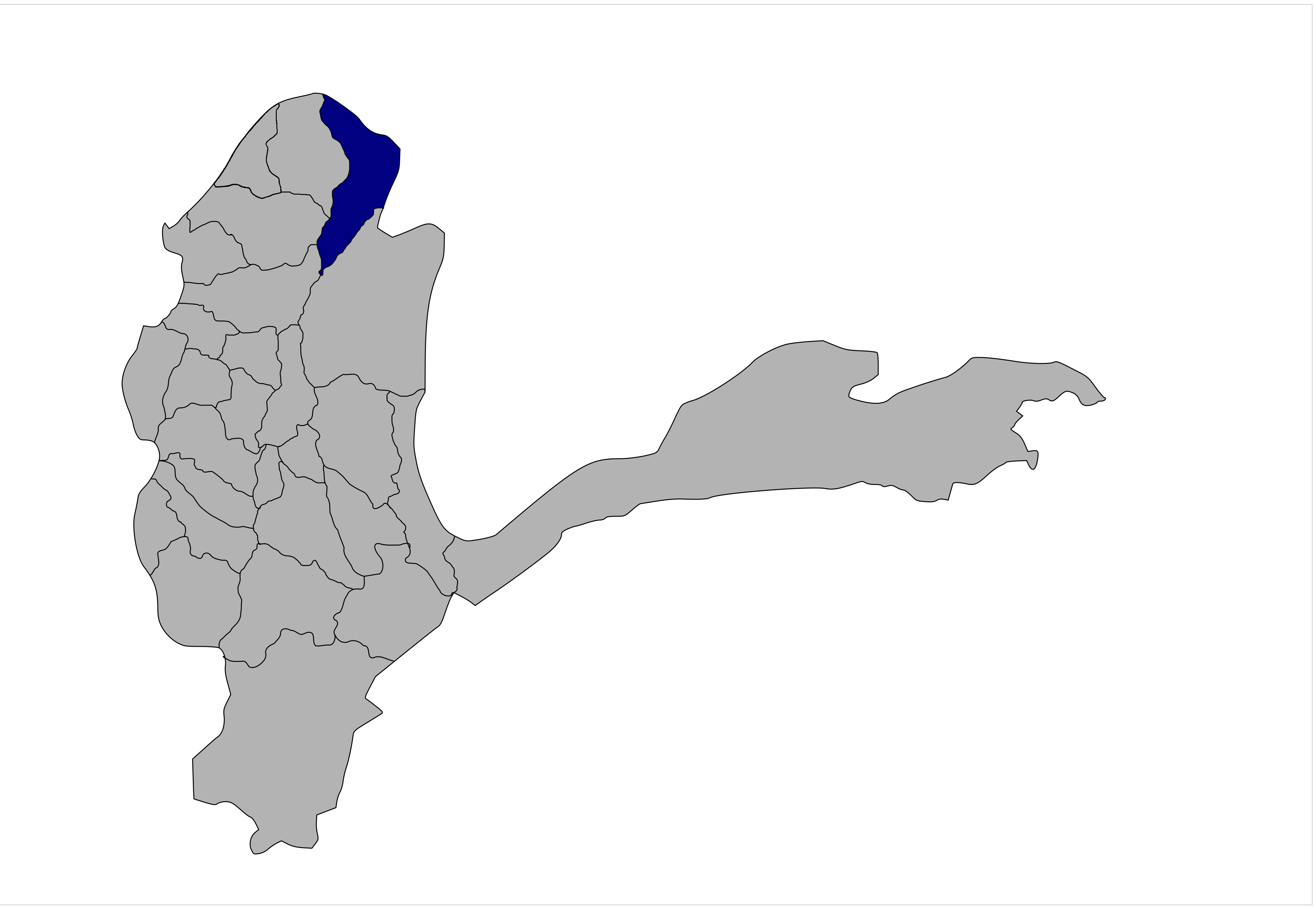

- Maimay District Location in Afghanistan
- Coordinates: 38°16′50″N 71°19′28″E
- Country: Afghanistan
- Province: Badakhshan
- Region: Badakhshan

Population
  - Total: 29,893
- Time zone: + 4:30

Maimay (Dari: مایمی), also known as Darwaz-e Payeen, or simply Darwaz, is a district in Badakhshan Province of Afghanistan. It was created in 2005 from part of Darwaz District. It is home to approximately 29,893 residents. Maimay borders the Kuf Ab, Raghistan, Shighnnan, and Nusay districts, along with some districts in the Gorno-Badakhshan Autonomous Province, Tajikistan, including Vanj, Rushon, and Shughnon. The district was historically part of the Darwaz principality, a semi-independent statelet ruled by a mir.

== See also ==
- Districts of Afghanistan
- Darwaz
