= Jamarj-e Bala =

Jamarj-e Bala جامرچ بالا
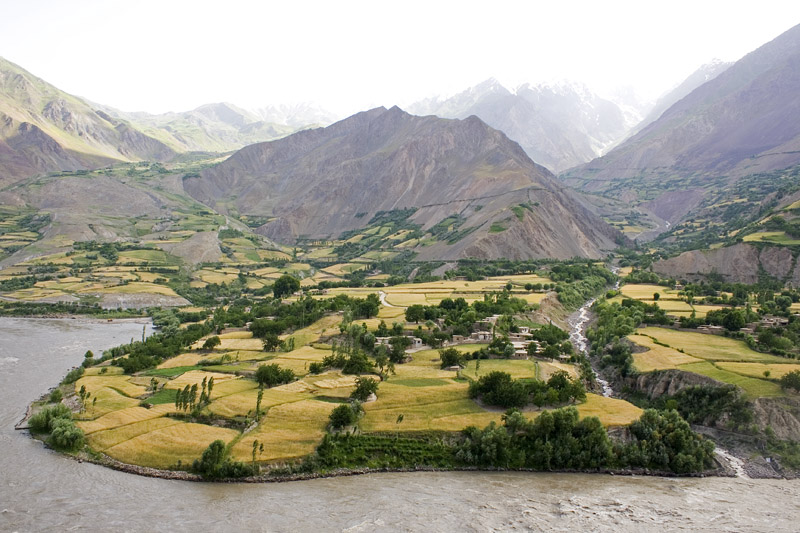
- View of Jamarj-e Bala

- Location in Afghanistan
- Coordinates: 38°16′41″N 71°19′12″E
- Country: Afghanistan
- Province: Badakhshan Province
- District: Maimay
- Time zone: + 4.30

Jamarj-e Bala (Dari: جامرچ بالا) is a village in the north-eastern Badakhshan Province of Afghanistan, serving as the capital of Maimay District. It is located on the Panj River near the Vanj River.

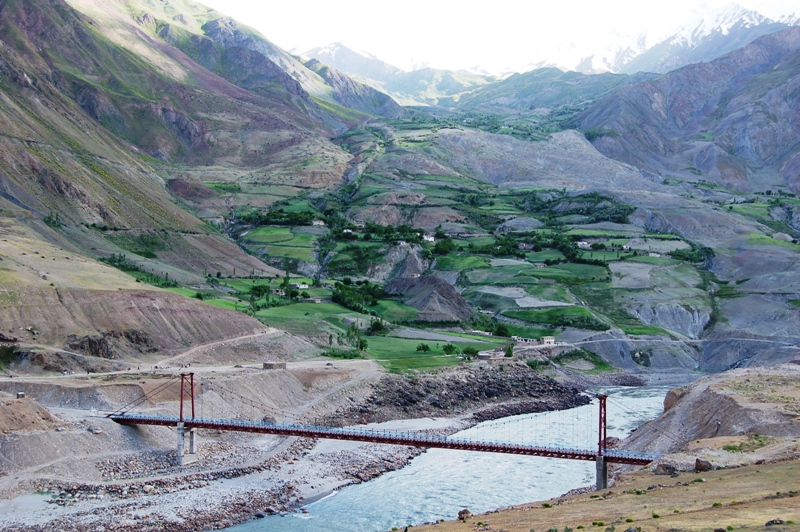
Friendship Bridge between Afghanistan and Tajikistan. Over the Panj River, In region Maimay District And Vanj district.

Various spelling variants include Jamarch-e `Olya.

It lies almost exactly on the Tajikistan border where it is connected via the M41 highway. The Darwāz language is still spoken in the area.

== See also ==
- Valleys of Afghanistan
- Tourism in Afghanistan
