= Yeylaq-e Amurn =

- Location in Afghanistan
- Coordinates: 38°12′5″N 71°18′34″E
- Country: Afghanistan
- Province: Badakhshan Province
- Time zone: + 4.30

Yeylaq-e Amurn is a village in Badakhshan Province in north-eastern Afghanistan.

It is located on the border with Tajikistan

== See also ==
- Badakhshan Province
