= Jarf =

Jarf جارف
- Location in Afghanistan
- Coordinates: 38°14′33″N 70°33′3″E
- Country: Afghanistan
- Province: Badakhshan Province
- District: Shekay
- Time zone: + 4.30

Jarf (Dari: جارف) is a village and the capital of Shekay District in Badakhshan Province, in north-eastern Afghanistan.
