= Kuf Ab District =

Kuf Ab کوف‌آب
- District
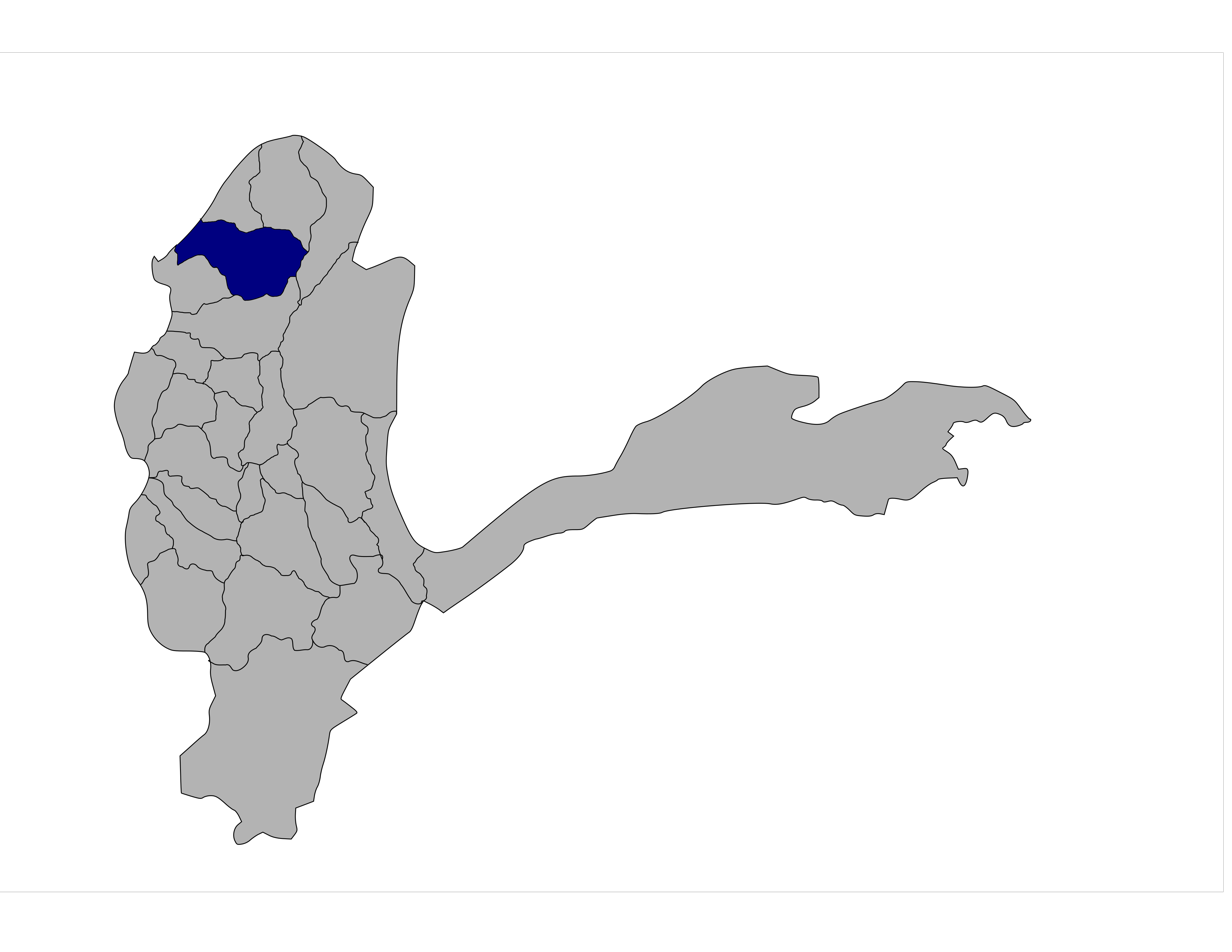
- Kuf Ab & Khwahan in Badakhshan map
- Coordinates: 38°2′28″N 70°28′43″E
- Country: Afghanistan
- Province: Badakhshan
- Region: Darwaz/Khwahan
- Capital: Qal`eh-ye Kuf

Population (2012)
  - Total: 25,243
- Time zone: + 4.30

Kuf Ab (Dari: کوف‌آب) is one of the 28 districts of Badakhshan province in eastern Afghanistan. It was created in 2005 from part of Khwahan and is home to approximately 25,243 residents. This district borders with the Districts Khwahan, Shekay, Nusay, Maimay, Raghistan, and with the Tajik district of Darvoz Gorno-Badakhshan Autonomous Province, Tajikistan.

The capital of the district is the village of Qal`eh-ye Kuf. During the early modern era Kuf Ab part of the Darwaz kingdom.

== See also ==
- Darwaz
