= Shekay District =

Shekay شِکی
- District
- Coordinates: 38°12′N 70°56′E
- Country: Afghanistan
- Province: Badakhshan
- Region: Darwaz
- Capital: Jarf

Population
  - Total: 27,000
  - Density: 1,700/km^{2} (4,400/sq mi)
- Time zone: + 4.30

Shekay or Shikai (Dari: شهرستان شِکی) is one of the 28 districts of Badakhshan province in northeastern Afghanistan. It was created in 2005 from part of Darwaz District and is home to approximately 26,000 residents. This district borders Nusay and Kuf Ab districts in Badakhshan and also Darvoz District in the Gorno-Badakhshan Autonomous Region of Tajikistan.

The village Jarf is the capital of the Shekay district.

== See also ==
- Darwaz
- Darwaz District
