= Ghar Javin =

Ghar Javin Ghār Javīn Ghār Jabīn, Ghār Jawīn, Ghār Zabīn
- Location in Afghanistan
- Coordinates: 37°28′0″N 71°27′0″E
- Country: Afghanistan
- Province: Badakhshan
- District: Shighnan
- Time zone: + 4.30

Ghar Javin is the name of a mountain pass and of a nearby village in Badakhshan Province in north-eastern Afghanistan. The valley contains three villages of the same time. Nearby is the direct road from Bar Panja, located some miles downstream, and Badakhshan. The village is located about four miles north of the pass.

Ghar Javin is located just across the Tajikistan border near Khorog.
