= Darwaz District =

Coordinates: 38°13′29″N 70°54′51″E

Darwaz درواز
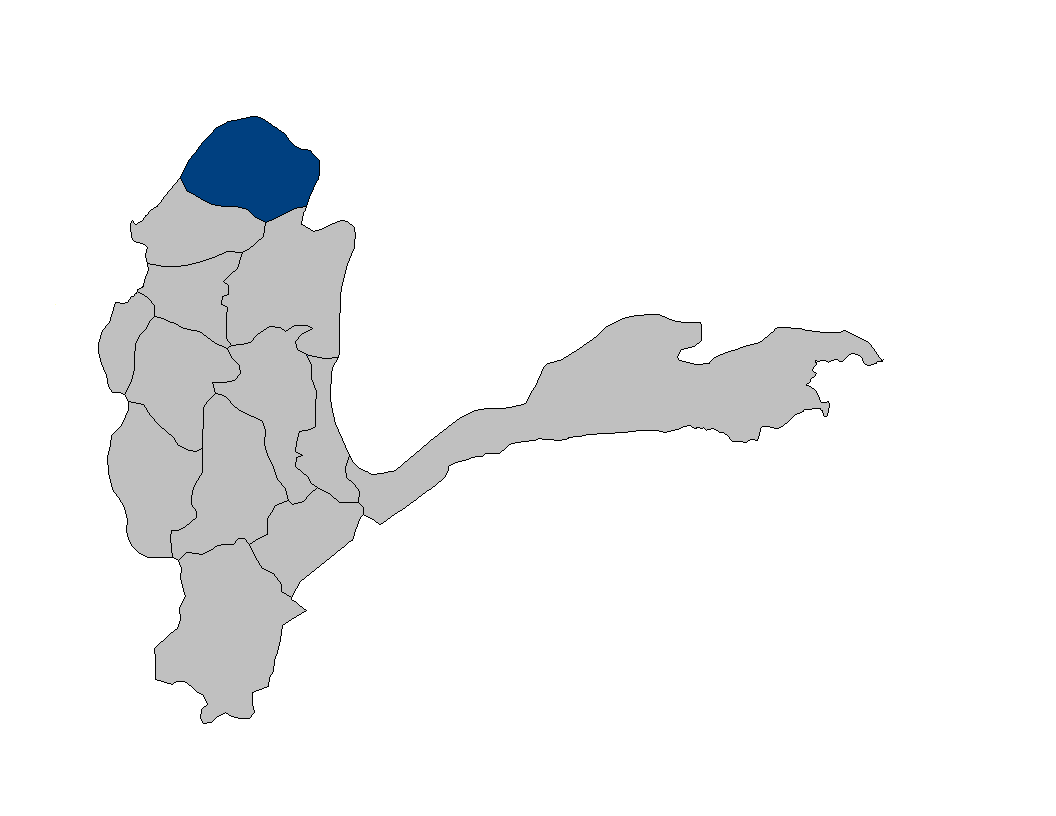
- Country: Afghanistan
- Province: Badakhshan

Government
  - Type: District council

Population
  - Estimate: 21,000

Darwaz district was a district in Badakhshan Province in Afghanistan until 2005. It was part of the historic region Darwaz which is now divided between Afghanistan and Tajikistan. In 2005 Darwaz District was subdivided into Maimay District, Darwazi Bala District, and Shekay District. Some maps use the name Darwaz for Maimay District. The district was historically part of the Darvaz principality, a semi-independent statelet ruled by a mir, until 1878.

== See also ==
- Darvaz (region)
- Darvoz District
