= Darwaz-e Bala District =

Darwazi Bala درواز بالا
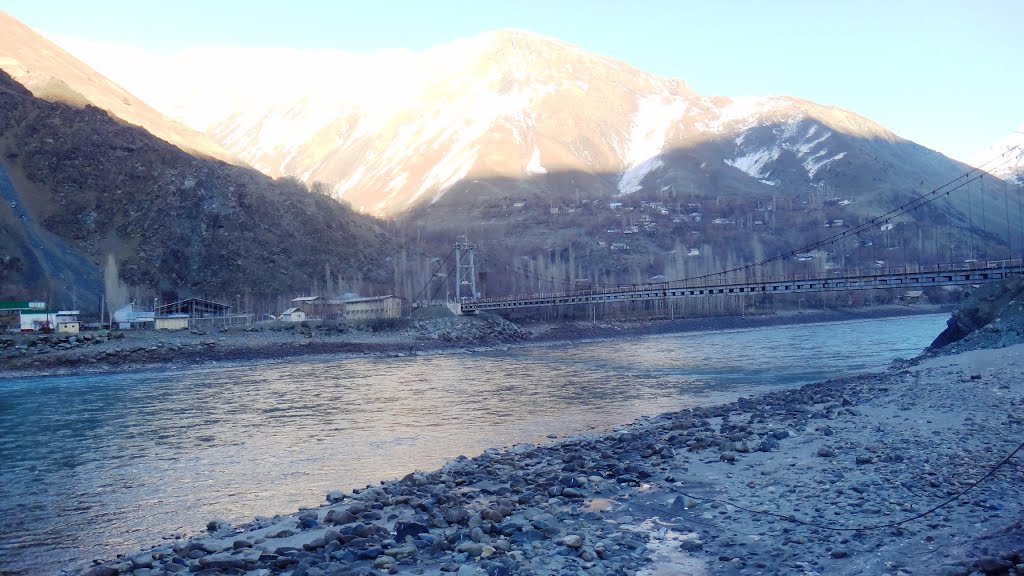
- A winter scenery in Darwazi Bala, near the Afghanistan–Tajikistan border overseeing the Tajik–Afghan Friendship Bridge

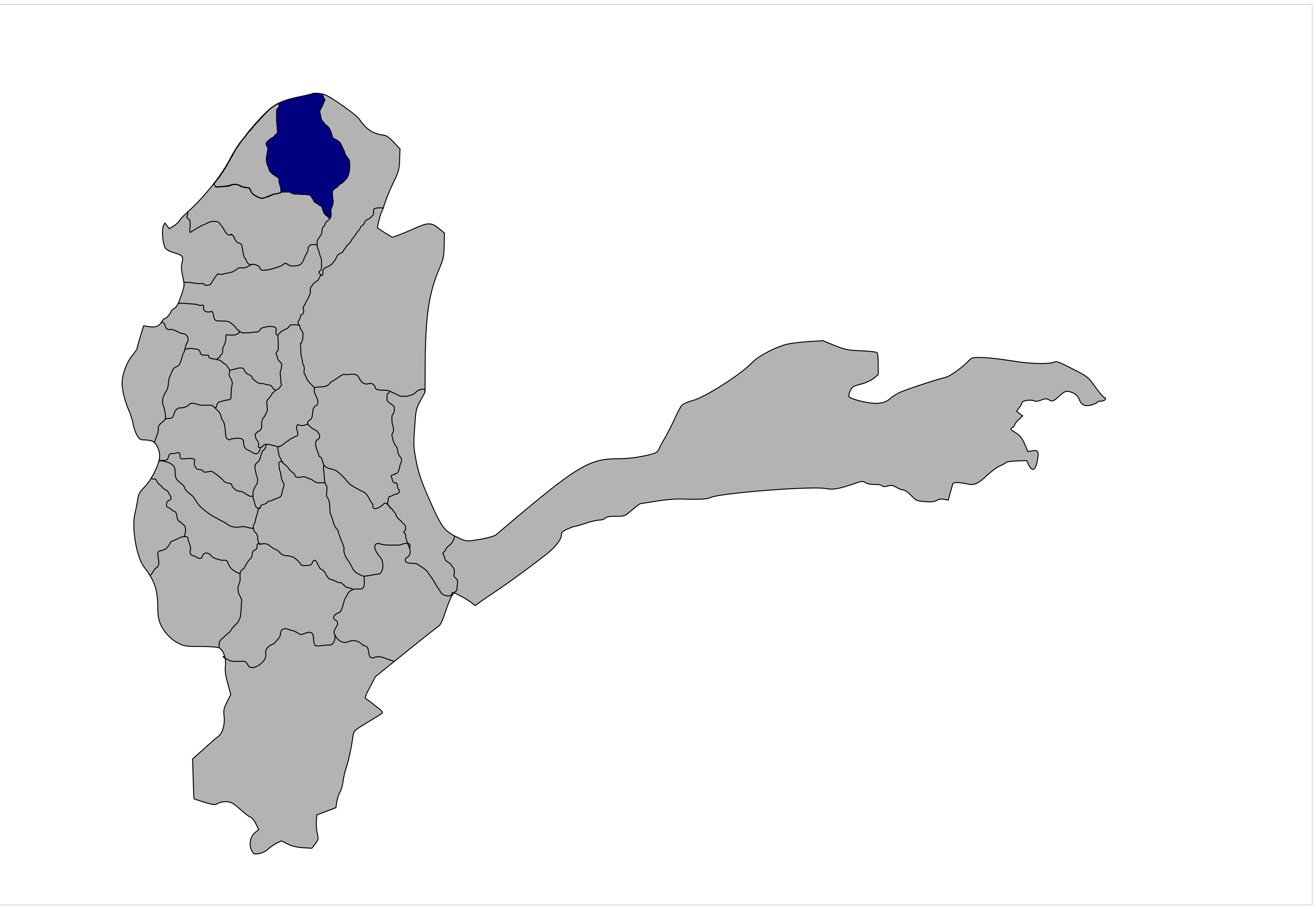

- Location in Afghanistan
- Country: Afghanistan
- Province: Badakhshan

Government
  - Type: District council
  - District governor: Jumah Khan Fatih

Population
  - Total: 26,173
- Time zone: UTC+04:30 (Afghanistan Time)

Darwaz-e Bala (Dari: درواز بالا), also known as Nusay, is one of the 28 districts of Badakhshan Province in northeastern Afghanistan. It has a population of approximately 26,173 people. It was created in 2005 from part of Darwaz District.

Darwaz-e Bala borders the Shekay, Kuf Ab, and Maimay districts, along with districts in Darvoz, Gorno-Badakhshan Autonomous Province, Tajikistan.

The district was historically part of the Darvaz principality, a semi-independent statelet ruled by a mir.

== Notable people ==
- Jumah Khan Fatih, political figure

== See also ==
- Districts of Afghanistan
- Darwaz
- Darwaz District
