= Darvaz (region) =

Historic region in what is now Tajikistan and Afghanistan

Darvaz درواز (Persian)
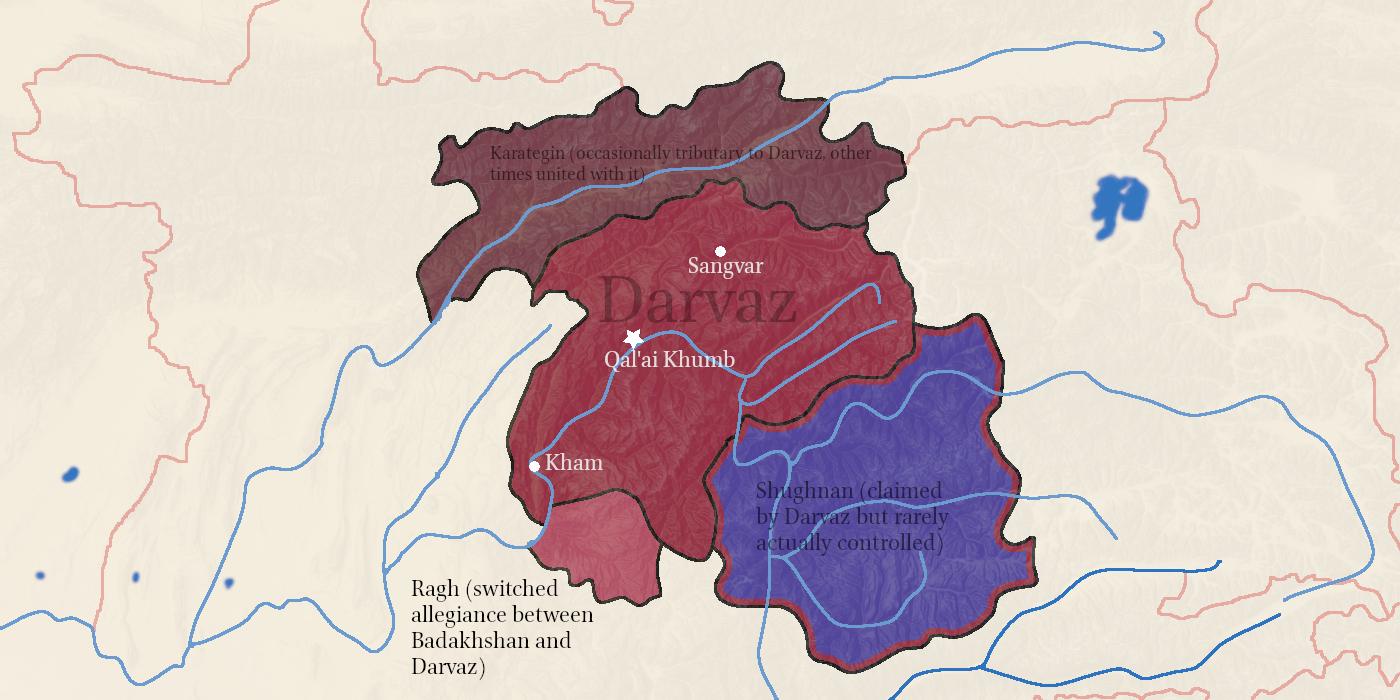
- Map of the Principality of Darvaz from the 17th to 19th centuries. Modern borders are overlaid in red.
- Capital: Qal'ai Khumb
- Common languages: Persian
- Religion: Sunni Islam Isma'ilism
- Government: Principality
- Mir
  - ?-1638: Shah Gharib
  - 1638-1668: Shah Qirghiz
  - 1668-1729: Mahmud Shah
  - 1734-1761: Muhammad Khan Shah?
  - 1762-1778: Mizrab Shah
  - 1778-1788: Shah-i Darvaz I
  - 1788-1797: Mansur Khan
  - 1797-1802: Shah Turk Khan/Shah Turkan
  - 1845-1863: Isma'il Shah
  - 1864-1868: Shah-i Darvaz II
  - ?-1878: Shah Siraj al-Din
Succeeded by
Emirate of Bukhara
- Today part of: Tajikistan; Afghanistan

Darvaz (Persian: درواز, romanized: Darwāz, Persian pronunciation: [daɾˈwaːz]), alternatively Darwaz, Darvoz, or Darwoz, or the Darvaz Khanate (Persian: خان‌نشین درواز, romanized: Xān-nišīn-i Darwāz) was an independent Tajik principality until 1878, ruled by a Mir and its capital was at Qal'ai Khumb. The principality controlled territory on the left and right banks of the Oxus River. The major settlements of Darvaz were Qal'ai Khumb and Kham.

== History ==
The emirate formed following the collapse of the Mongolian empire, as one of a number of small statelets along the remote mountainous portion of the Panj river valley.

Traditionally, it was able to maintain its independence against its more powerful neighbors. At the beginning of the 16th century, the region was caught up in the conflict between the Timurids and the Uzbeks.

Despite the Uzbek conquest of Badakhshan, it seems the northern part of Darvaz was able to maintain independence.

During the 17th century, the ruler of Darvaz was Shah Qirghiz. Information regarding the length of his reign was disputed. Barthold writes that in 1638 the Uzbeks conquered Darvaz and executed the ruler, his brother Shah Gharib. In his stead, Shah Qirghiz became an independent ruler and reigned from 1638 to 1668. However, other sources report that Shah Qirghiz founded the new capital of Darvaz at Qal'ai Khumb in 1606–07. The capital had previously been located 6.5 kilometers to the northeast.

However, most historians can agree that under his reign Darvaz became a powerful state. Reportedly, Wakhan, Karategin, Roshan, Shughnan, and Wakhsh were under his suzerainty. Upon his death and during the 60-year long reign of his successor, Mahmud Shah, Wakhan and Shughnan-Roshan were able to declare their independence.

The primary rival of Darvaz were the Yarid rulers of Badakhshan, who ruled the area from 1657. Multiple conflicts would be fought between the two over the region of Ragh, a semi-independent principality located along their border. During the reign of Mir Sultan Shah, ruler of Badakhshan from 1748 to 1768, Shah Yadgar was the Mir of Ragh. He previously submitted tribute to Darvaz but then switched his allegiance to Fayzabad. In response the Shahs of Darvaz led a punitive expedition against Ragh, but Mir Sultan Shah was able to provide aid to his vassal and repulsed Darvaz's troops.

During this period Darvaz was ruled by a confederation of brothers, all sons of a Shah Gharibullah. (Ghulamov lists these brothers as Tughma Shah, Mansur Khan, 'Aziz Khan, Shahrukh Mirza, Sa'adat Shah, and Sultan Mahmud.) These brothers allied themselves with the rulers of Shughnan against Mir Sultan Shah. In 1749, they defeated the Mir at Gharjvin and took a large portion of his army, including his brother Burhan al-Din into captivity.

He was forced to send a peace delegation, led by a high-ranking religious leader named Mulla 'Azim Akhund Mufti, to Darvaz to plead for their release.

While there, Mulla joined a religious discussion among the nobles and 'ulama of the court and was able to show off his intellect. Tughma Shah quickly took a liking to him and agreed to his request to release the captives.

During the 19th century it was still seen as a stable principality. In the 1820s and 1830s, Karategin was unified with Darvaz.

In the 1830s, Muhammad Murad Beg attempted to conquer the principality, but these attacks were unsuccessful and only encouraged the ruler of Darvaz to counter-raid, as the principality had a strong army compared to its neighbors. In 1839 the ruler of Khoqand, Madali Khan, conquered both Karategin and Darvaz and forced Sultan Mahmud to pay tribute. However, it soon regained its independence. During the rule of Isma'il Shah from 1845 to 1863, Karategin and Shughnan were turned into protectorates and the bekdoms of Kulab and Hisar became its tributaries.

== Conquest by Bukhara ==
During the instability in Khoqand that had been occurring since 1842, the Mir of Karategin, Muhammad Rahim, had provided shelter to political enemies and was adamant on opposing Russian expansion into Central Asia. During the Russian campaign against Khoqand in 1875–76, rumors began to spread of an impending attack by the Mir of Karategin. As a result, when the campaign was over the Emir of Bukhara, Muzaffar, had an excuse to invade both of these principalities.

Despite efforts in the spring of 1876 by the Mir to avoid the incoming assault, by early August the principality was in the hands of Bukhara and Mohammad Rahim was put under house arrest. Muhammad Sa'id was appointed the ruler of Karategin but the following year he was deposed, with Karategin becoming a Bukharan beylik (province).

In December 1877, after Shah Sirajuddin refused to pay tribute to the Emir of Bukhara, Darvaz was invaded. By the following spring, it had been occupied and absorbed into Bukhara. 200 people were killed during this conflict. It was placed under the administration of the Emir and controlled by a militia numbering 500–600. By this time, the principality's territories were limited to Qal'a-yi Khumb, Wanch, Yazghulam, and the lands of amlak-dars (estate holders) on the left bank of the Panj as far south as Khwahan. Shah Sirajuddin lived in confinement until the end of Muzaffar's reign, when he was released on orders of the governor-general of Turkestan. The Mir's sons managed to escape to Bukhara, while two other relatives of Sirajuddin, who were amlak-dars on the left bank of the Panj, managed to flee to Badakhshan. One tried to seize the left bank of the Panj supported by the Afghans, but failed and was executed in Bukhara.

== Government ==
The Mirs of Darvaz and their power was based on a system of patronage. The Mir's supporters were given shares of loot from raids as well as revenues from taxation. The existence of large extended families resulted in internal divisions of labor.

Although the Mirdom of Darwaz was incorporated into the modern states of Afghanistan and Tajikistan, the descendents of the emirate remain in the area, with as many as 40 to 50 villages still speaking the Darwaz language, considered by them to be a dialect of Dari, and the related Tengshaw language, in villages closer to Vanj.

Limited ethological studies seem to incur that Darwaz culture has two classes: a landed and an un-landed class.
