= Badakhshan Province =

Province of Afghanistan

Badakhshan Province بدخشان
- Province
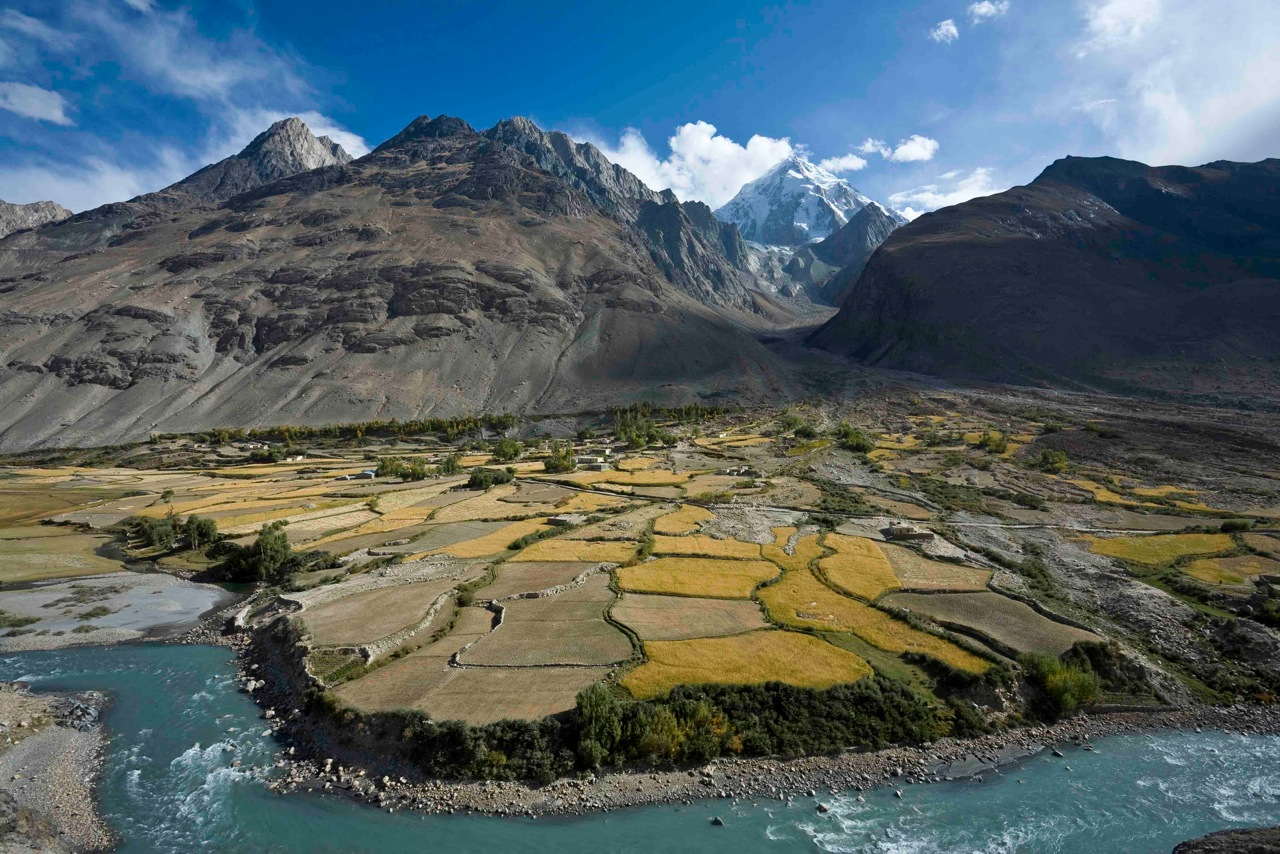
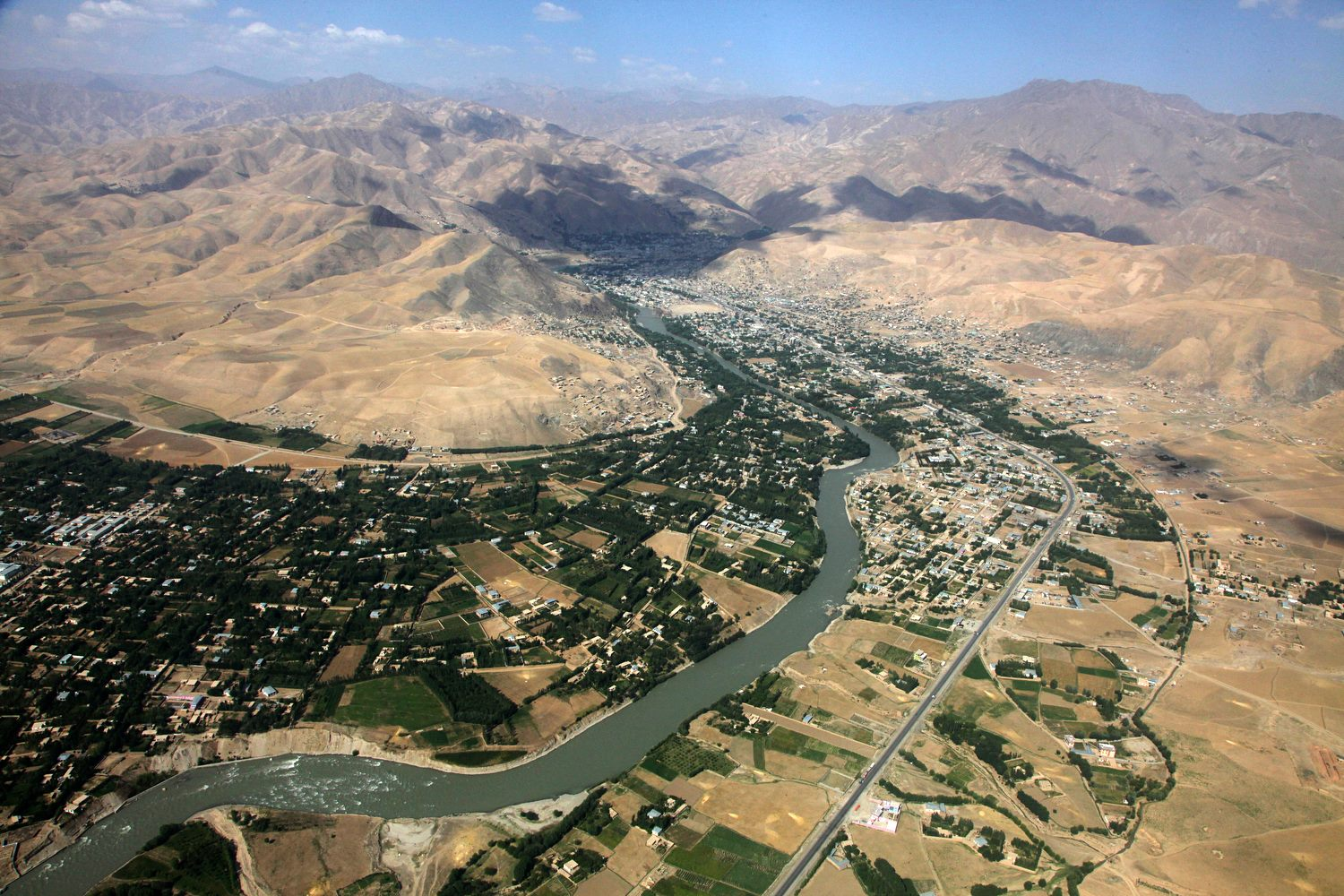
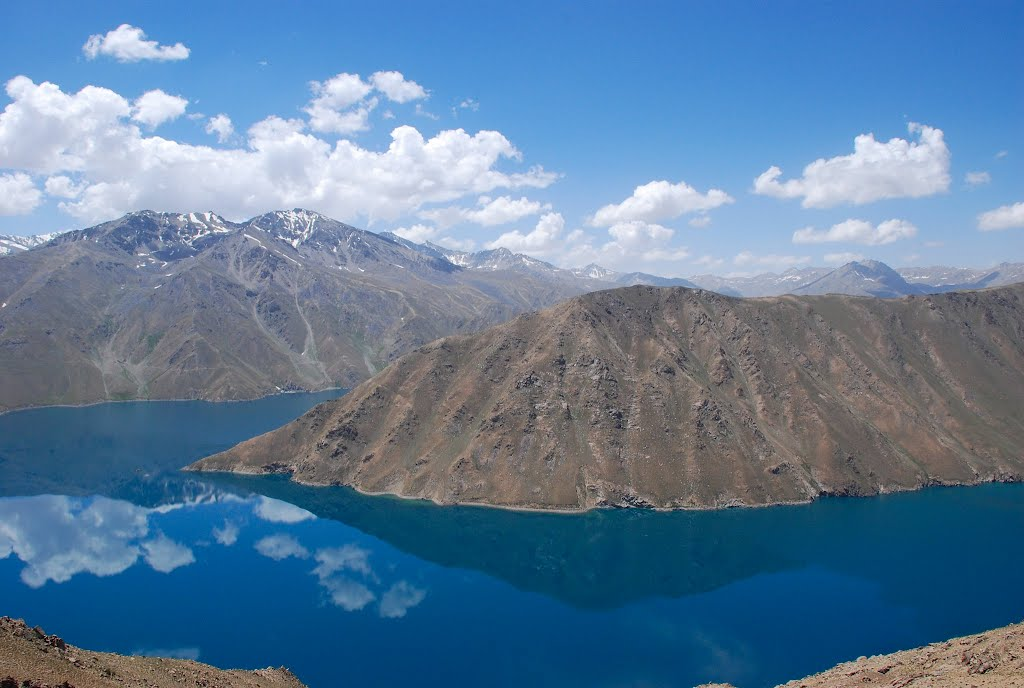
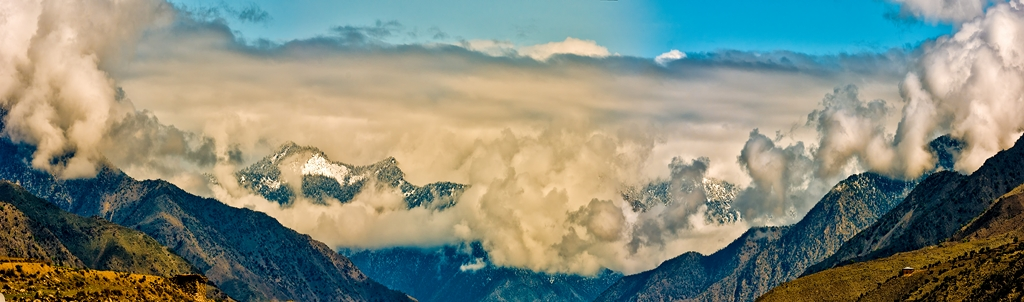
- Wakhan District Fayzabad Shiwa Lake Badakhshan mountains

- Map of Afghanistan with Badakhshan highlighted
- Coordinates: 38°0′N 71°0′E
- Country: Afghanistan
- Capital: Fayzabad

Government
  - Governor: Mawlawi Mollah Rahmatullah Najib

Area
  - Total: 44,835 km^{2} (17,311 sq mi)

Population (2023)
  - Total: c. 1.1 million
  - Density: 24.5/km^{2} (63/sq mi)
- Demonym: Badakhshi
- Time zone: UTC+4:30 (Afghanistan Time)
- Postal code: 34XX
- ISO 3166 code: AF-BDS
- Main languages: Dari, Pashto, and Pamiri languages among others

Badakhshan (Note: Pashto: Pashto pronunciation: [zɑˈbəl]: بدخشان Dari: Dari pronunciation: [zɑː.bʊ́l]: بدخشان) is one of the northeastern provinces of Afghanistan. It borders Gorno-Badakhshan region of Tajikistan to the north, Xinjiang province of China to the east, and northern provinces of Pakistan to the south, while internally it neighbors the Afghan provinces of Takhar and Panjshir. The provincial capital is Fayzabad, which functions as the main administrative, economic, and cultural center of the province.

Historically a part of the broader Badakhshan region, the province has served as an important cultural and commercial crossroads between Central Asia, South Asia, and the Iranian world. It was internationally known for the ancient lapis lazuli mines of Sar-i Sang, which have been exploited for thousands of years and supplied gemstones to ancient civilizations in Mesopotamia, Egypt, and Indus Valley. The Emirate of Badakhshan was annexed into Afghanistan in 1873; the province was established in 1965 after promulgation of 1964 Afghanistan Constitution.

Covering an area of approximately 44,000 square kilometers and having an estimated population of about 1.2 million people (as of 2025), Badakhshan is defined by its mountainous terrain, dominated by the mountain ranges of Hindu Kush and Pamir, as well as by deep river valleys shaped primarily by the Kokcha and Panj rivers. The province includes the Wakhan Corridor, a narrow high-altitude strip that extends eastward between Tajikistan and Pakistan to China, giving Badakhshan a unique geopolitical position as Afghanistan's only land connection to China.

== Etymology ==
The name Badakhshan is derived from the Sasanian official title Bidaxsh (Middle Persian: 𐭡𐭲𐭧𐭱𐭩, romanized: badaxš), which referred to a local ruler or high-ranking governor in eastern Iranian regions, combined with the suffix "-ān", meaning "land of". The name can therefore be interpreted as "the land of the Bedakhsh (ruler)". The term remained in continuous use through Persian, Arabic, Afghan and later Islamic geographical traditions.

== History ==
=== Antiquity ===
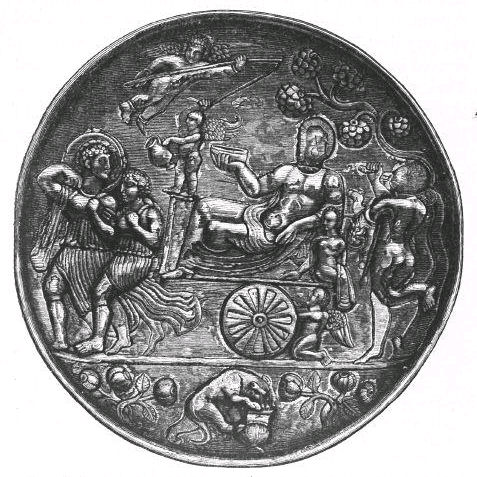
Ancient silver patera of debased Greek art, formerly in the possession of the Princess of Badakhshan

The region known today as Badakhshan has been inhabited since prehistoric times, as evidenced by archaeological findings in mountain valleys and river basins. It gained early importance due to its rich deposits of lapis lazuli, which were mined as early as the 3rd millennium BC and traded across Mesopotamia, Egypt, the Indus Valley, and Central Asia. During antiquity, Badakhshan formed part of several major empires. It was incorporated into the Achaemenid Empire, later influenced by Hellenistic rule following the campaigns of Alexander the Great, and subsequently became part of the Greco-Bactrian and Kushan empires. Buddhism and Zoroastrianism were present in the region before the arrival of Islam. Due to its mountainous terrain, local rulers often retained a high degree of political autonomy, even under imperial control.

=== Medieval ===
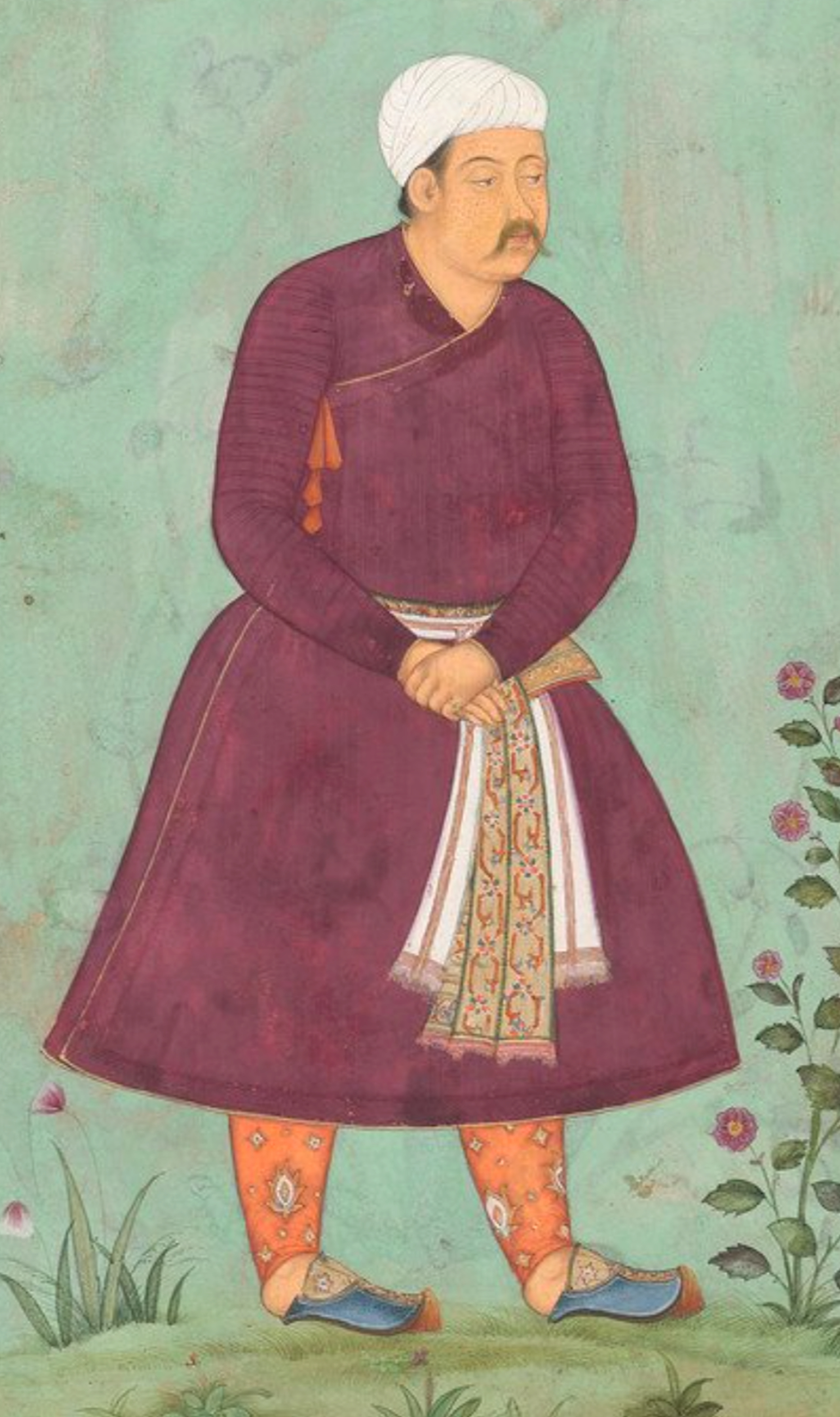
Mirza Shah Rukh (d. 1607-8), ruler of Badakhshan

From the 8th century onward, Badakhshan gradually became part of the Islamic world following the Muslim conquest of Khorasan. It later came under the control of successive Persian and Turkic dynasties, including the Samanids, Ghaznavids, and Seljuks. During the Timurid period, Badakhshan became integrated into the broader political and cultural networks of Central Asia and Persia. The region produced scholars, poets, and administrators who contributed to Persian-Islamic civilization. Despite nominal imperial rule, Badakhshan frequently functioned as a semi-autonomous principality, governed by local mirs (rulers) who exercised considerable independence due to the geographic isolation of the region. In the late medieval period, Badakhshan experienced repeated conflicts between regional powers, including the Uzbek Khanate of Bukhara, Safavid Iran, and the Mughal empire, which weakened centralized authority and reinforced local rule. The Emirate of Badakhshan became independent in 1657. In the mid-18th century, the Badakhshan Emirate became subject to the Durrani Empire.

=== Modern ===
In 1873, the Emirate of Badakhshan was formally abolished and the region was incorporated into the Emirate of Afghanistan, as the Afghan emirs who sought to centralize power across the country. This period coincided with the so-called Great Game between the British and Russian empires, which led to the formal demarcation of Afghanistan's northeastern borders. The creation of the Wakhan Corridor during that time established Badakhshan as a buffer zone between British India and the Russian Empire. This arrangement fixed the international boundaries and secured Afghanistan's narrow land connection to Qing China. During the early 20th century, Badakhshan remained administratively marginal, with limited state investment and weak infrastructure. Local governance continued to rely heavily on traditional authority structures alongside the central government.

==== Soviet invasion and onwards ====
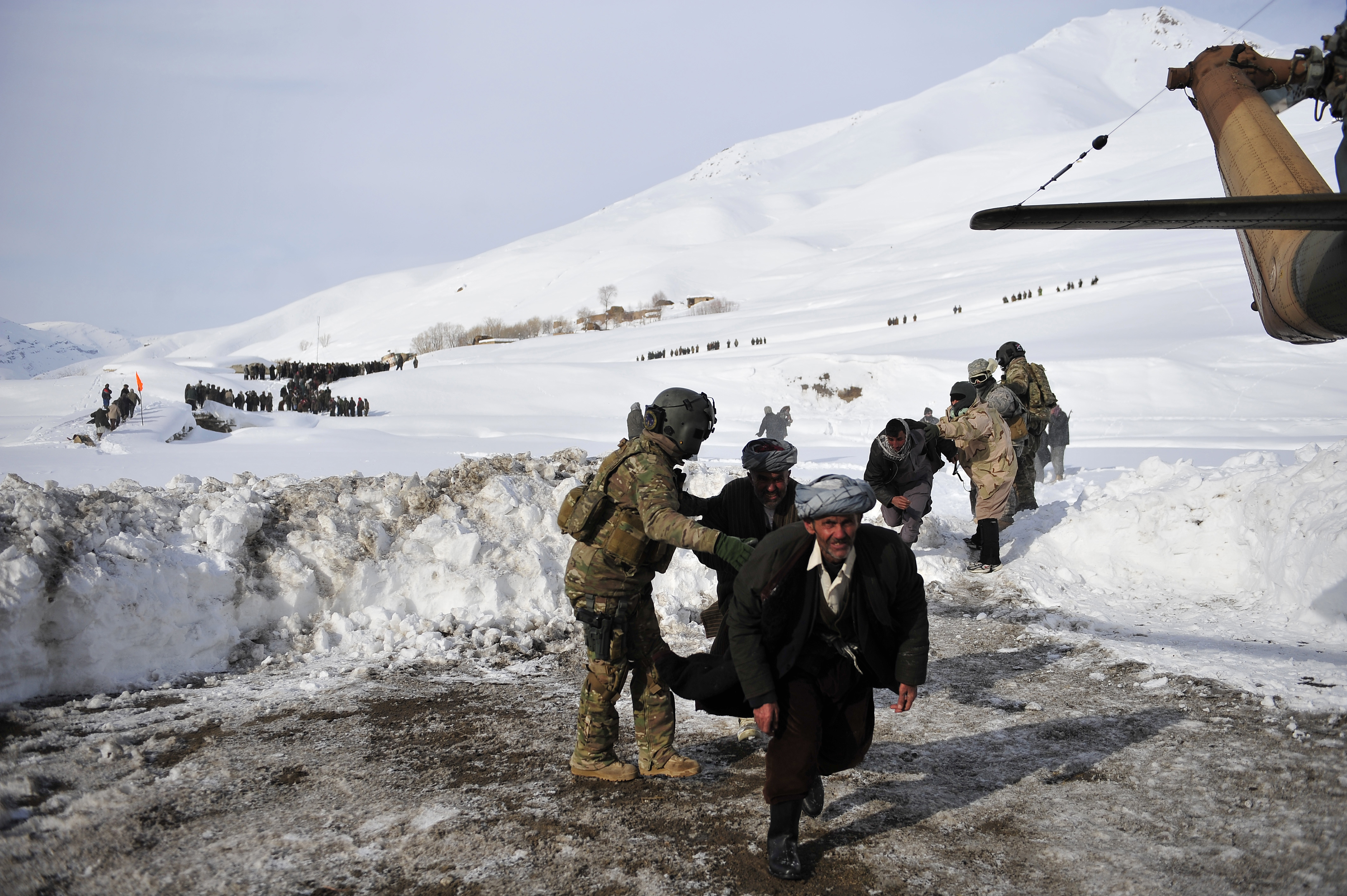
American and Afghan Airmen conducting a rescue mission in Badakhshan after an avalanche (2012)

Following the Soviet invasion of Afghanistan in 1979, Badakhshan became an important base for mujahideen resistance forces. Its rugged terrain made it difficult for Soviet and government forces to establish effective control. The province served both as a military stronghold and a logistical corridor linking Afghanistan to Tajikistan. During the Afghan civil war of the 1990s, Badakhshan emerged as one of the main power bases of the Northern Alliance with the Badakhshani native Burhanuddin Rabbani as the political head. Unlike most other regions, Badakhshan was never fully captured by the Taliban during their first period of rule from 1996 to 2001. After the American-led invasion of Afghanistan in 2001, the province remained relatively stable compared to southern and eastern Afghanistan, although it continued to experience insurgent attacks, political disputes, and criminal activity, including illegal mining and smuggling.

Following the collapse of the Afghan government in August 2021, Badakhshan came under the control of the Taliban. The transition was accompanied by localized resistance in several districts, particularly in mountainous areas. Since then, as all provinces, Badakhshan has faced economic decline, restrictions on civil liberties, and a reduction in international development assistance. Mining activities, especially lapis lazuli extraction, have continued but remain heavily contested. Humanitarian conditions have deteriorated in several districts due to poverty, food insecurity, and reduced access to health and education, particularly for women and girls. Security in the province remains volatile, with reports of armed resistance, inter-community tensions, and strategic competition over border zones, especially near Tajikistan and the Wakhan Corridor.

== Geography ==
Badakhshan is located in the far northeastern part of Afghanistan and is one of the most geographically extreme provinces of the country. It is defined by high mountain systems, deep valleys, major transboundary rivers, and permanent snowfields. The province shares international borders with Tajikistan, China, and Pakistan, giving it a unique geographic and strategic position within Central and South Asia.

=== Landscape ===
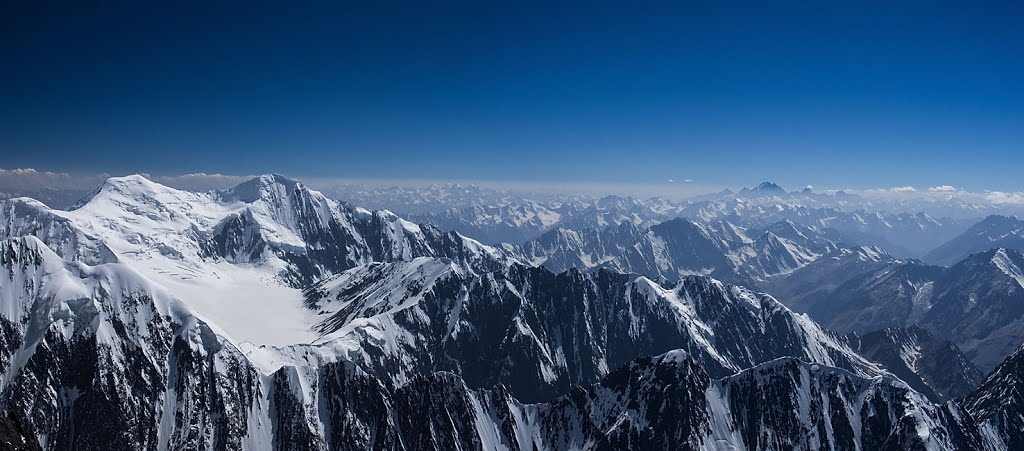
Noshaq (Dari: نوشاخ) lies on the border between Pakistan and Badakhshan and is the second highest independent peak of the Hindu Kush Range

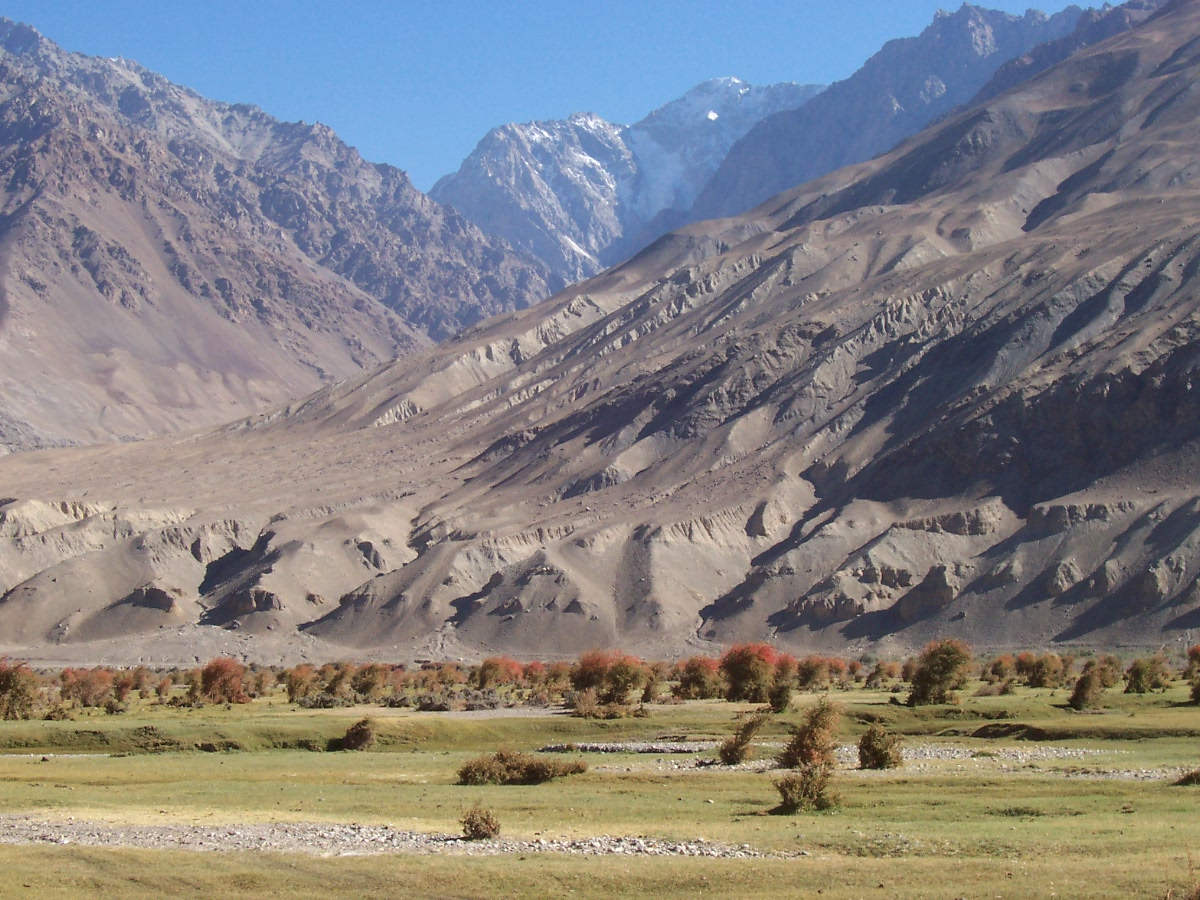
Valley of Kuran wa Munjan in Badakhshan

Badakhshan is dominated by three major mountain systems: the Hindu Kush, the Pamirs, and the Karakoram ranges. Large parts of the province lie at elevations above 3,000 meters, with several peaks exceeding 6,000 meters. These extreme elevations make Badakhshan one of the highest inhabited regions in the world. The province contains the Wakhan Corridor, a narrow high-altitude strip extending eastward toward China. This corridor separates Tajikistan from Pakistan and forms Afghanistan's only direct border with China.

The most important river system is the Panj River, which forms the natural boundary between Afghanistan and Tajikistan and later becomes part of the Amu Darya basin. Other major rivers include the Kokcha River, which flows through central Badakhshan, and the Wakhan River, which drains the eastern highlands. These rivers create narrow fertile valleys that support most human settlement. These valleys are typically steep-sided and isolated, with settlements concentrated along riverbanks and alluvial terraces. Many districts are accessible only through mountain passes, which are often closed for long periods during winter.

According to the World Wide Fund for Nature and One Earth, Badakhshan's diverse terrain also spans several terrestrial biomes, including montane grasslands and shrublands, temperate coniferous forests, and small areas of deserts and xeric shrublands, reflecting its variation from high Pamir peaks to lower valleys. These biomes support the province's distinct flora and fauna and shape local agriculture and traditional livelihoods.

=== Flora and Fauna ===
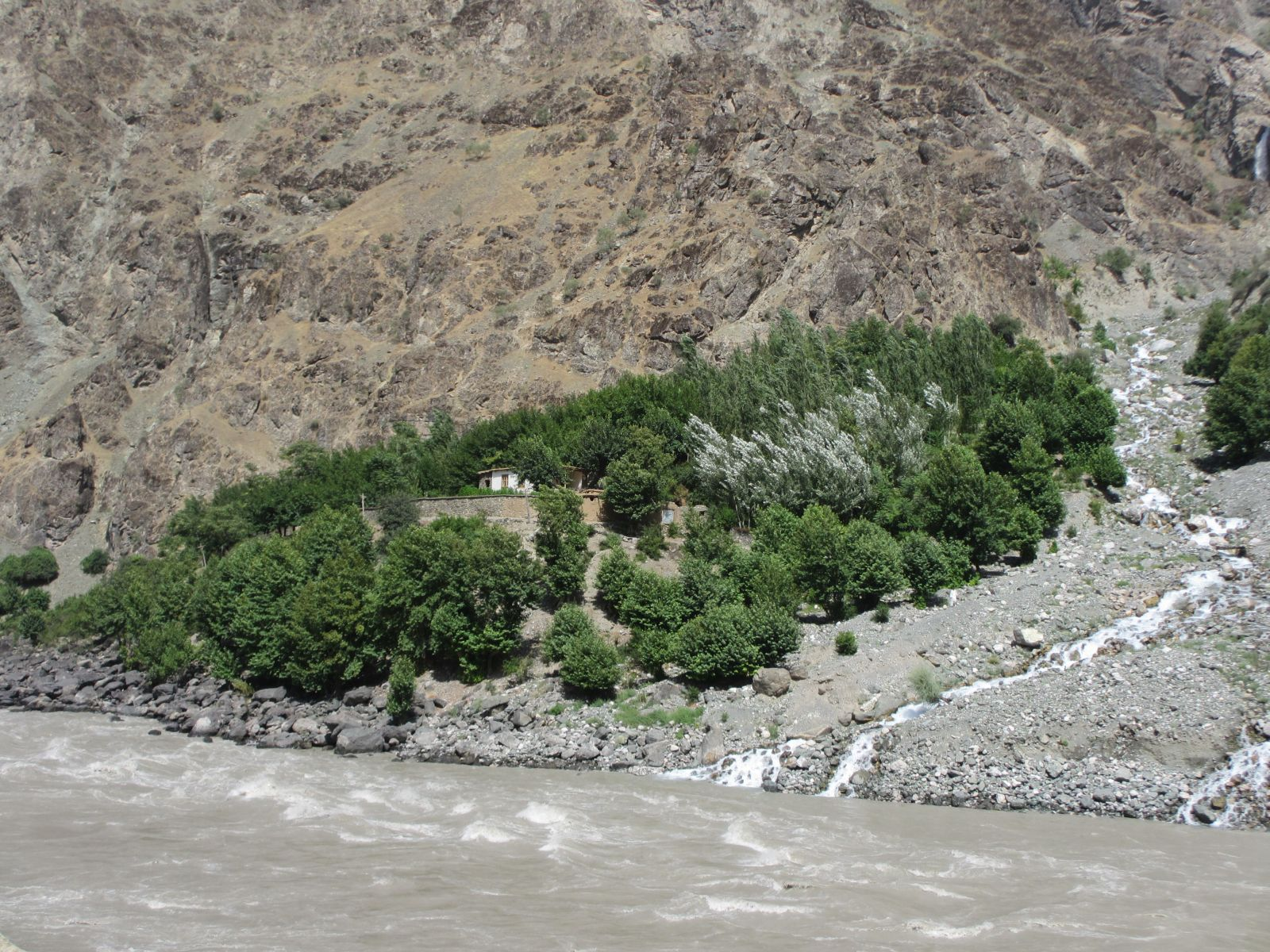
Trees, shrubs and grasses in Badakhshan (2012)

Badakhshan hosts diverse flora and fauna, shaped by altitude and climate. Vegetation includes coniferous forests in lower mountain zones, alpine meadows at higher elevations, and sparse vegetation in arid valleys. Common trees include juniper, pine, and birch, while shrubs and grasses dominate alpine plateaus. Fruit-bearing and nut-producing trees such as apricots, mulberries, apples, walnuts, and almonds grow in river valleys and lower slopes.

The province supports wildlife adapted to high-altitude environments, such as snow leopards, ibex, markhor, Himalayan brown bears, wolves, and various bird species, including raptors and waterfowls along river valleys. Human activity, deforestation, and hunting have affected some populations, though remote areas remain important refuges for wildlife.

=== Climate ===
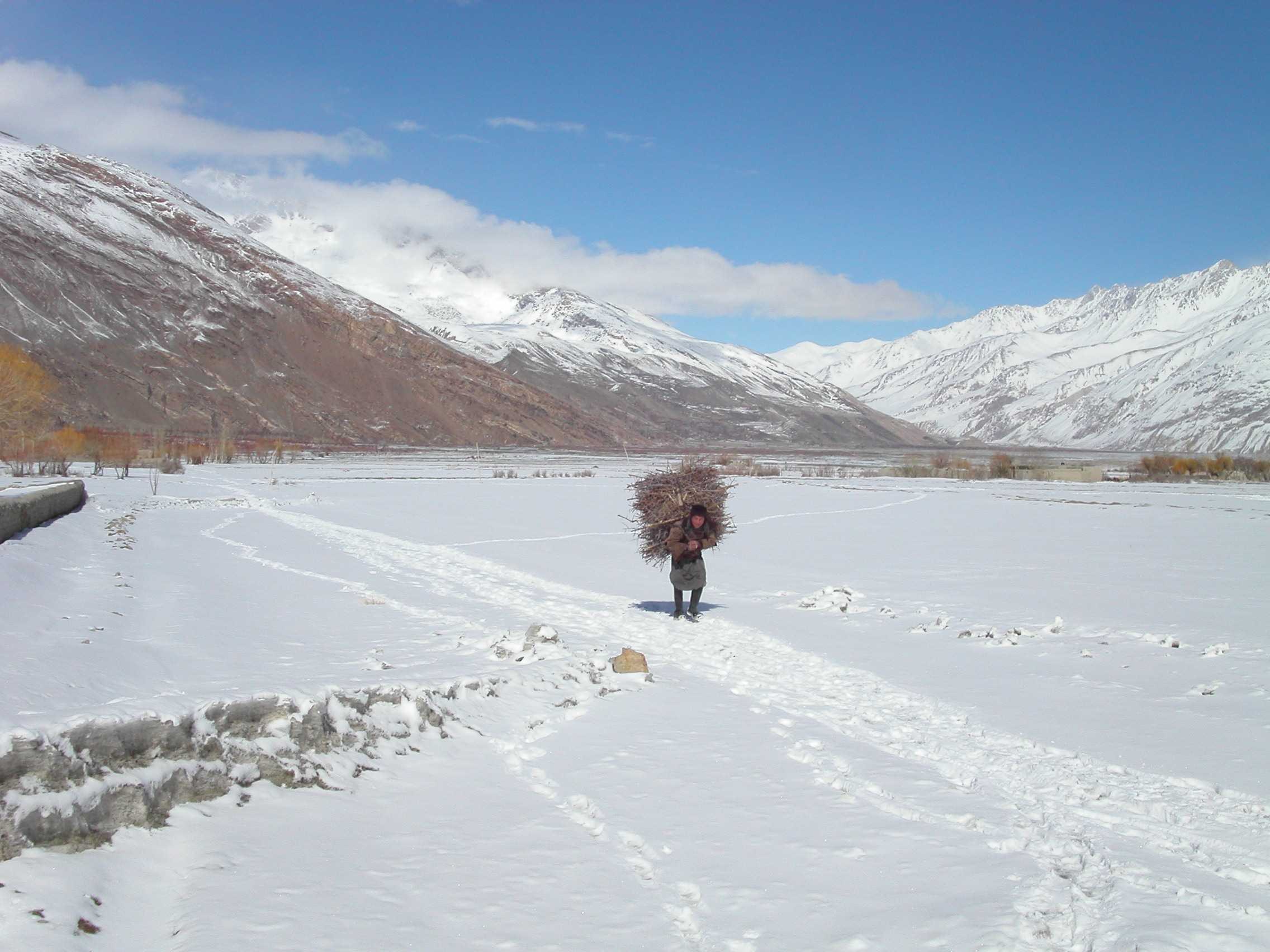
A Wakhi man collecting firewood in light snow (2007)

Badakhshan has a harsh continental highland climate, strongly influenced by altitude. Winters are long and extremely cold, particularly in the Pamir and Wakhan regions, where temperatures frequently fall far below freezing, often reaching −20 to −30 °C in the highest areas. Snow cover can persist for most of the year in these high-altitude zones. Summers are short and relatively cool, especially at higher elevations, with temperatures typically ranging from 10 to 20 °C, while lower valleys experience moderate summer temperatures of 20 to 30 °C. Precipitation varies significantly by altitude and exposure, with snowfall being the dominant form of precipitation in most regions. Seasonal isolation is a major geographic constraint, as many villages remain cut off for several months each year due to heavy snow, landslides, and flooded river crossings.

== Government and politics ==
=== Local governance ===
Local governance in Badakhshan has evolved significantly in modern times. During the 19th century, the province was largely governed by local chieftains and semi-independent khans and mirs, who maintained allegiance to Kabul but exercised substantial autonomy over taxation, security, and dispute resolution. In the 20th century, the central government attempted to strengthen provincial administration, introducing formal district offices and appointing governors, though local tribal and familial networks continued to wield considerable influence.

Since 1979, Badakhshan has experienced major political shifts due to the Afghan conflict: Soviet invasion, civil war, Taliban rule, and subsequent international interventions. During the 1980s, local mujahideen commanders, some aligned with the Jamiat-e Islami party, held significant power in both security and administration, often coordinating with or resisting central authorities. In the post-2001 period, the Afghan government reasserted formal governance through appointed governors and district officials, while local councils and tribal elders continued to mediate disputes and manage community affairs. Key figures included Burhanuddin Rabbani, leader of the Northern Alliance, who had historical influence in the broader northern regions, and regional commanders who often acted as political brokers.

Following the Taliban's return to power in 2021, provincial administration has been reorganized under Taliban-appointed officials. The local governance system now reflects the hierarchical structure of the Islamic Emirate, with a provincial governor and district leaders enforcing central directives, while tribal networks and community elders maintain informal influence, especially in remote areas such as the Wakhan Corridor and highland districts. Political parties as recognized under the former 2004 Afghan constitution are no longer active, but loyalty networks, local religious leaders, and former mujahideen figures continue to play a role in mediating disputes and influencing governance outcomes.

As of October 2025, the governor of Badakhshan is Mawlawi Ismail Ghaznawi.

=== Administrative divisions ===
Badakhshan is one of the most fragmented provinces of Afghanistan, consisting of more than twenty-five districts. The provincial capital, Fayzabad, functions as the main administrative, economic, and logistical center. District boundaries and administrative competencies have changed repeatedly over recent decades due to population growth, security considerations, and political decisions taken by successive governments. In many remote districts, state presence remains minimal, and local administration operates with limited personnel, weak infrastructure, and irregular communication with provincial authorities.

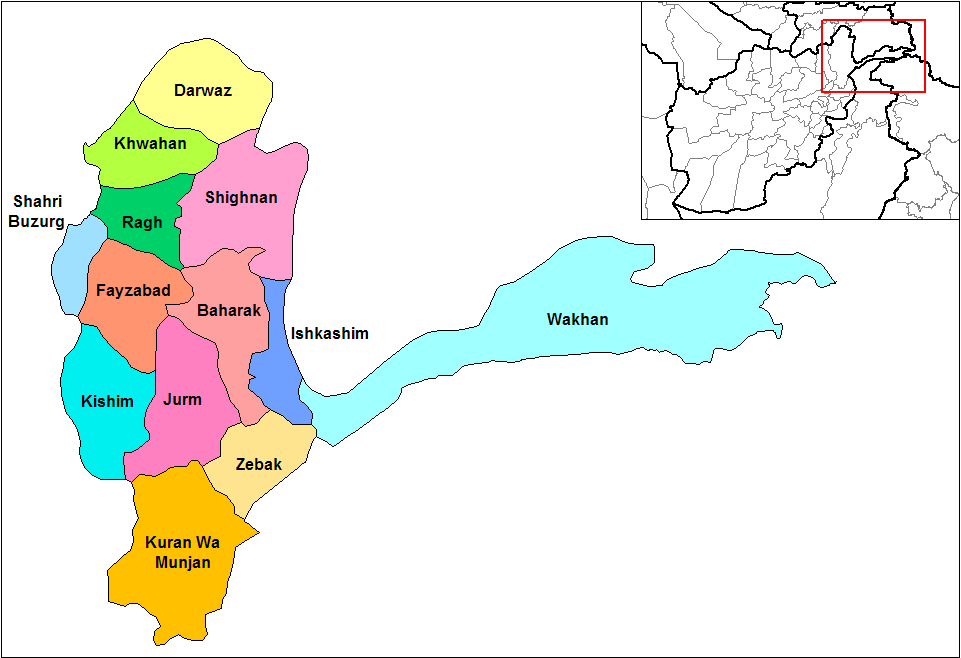
Map of the districts of Badakhshan as of January 2004, prior to the redrawing of provincial and district boundaries later that year

Districts of Badakhshan Province
District	Capital	Population	Area in km^{2}	Pop. density	Villages Ethnic groups
Arghanj Khwa		18,201	2,327	8	Majority Farsiwan (Tajiks, Aimaqs).
Argo		88,616	1,059	84	145 villages. Majority Tajik, minority Turkmens.
Baharak	Baharak	32,551	324	101	51 villages. 100% Tajik.
Darayim		69,618	585	119	101 villages. 100% Tajik.
Fayzabad	Fayzabad	77,154	497	155	175 villages. 100% Tajik.
Ishkashim	Ishkashim	15,677	1,415	11	43 villages. Predominantly Pamiris (Ishkashimi), few Tajik.
Jurm	Jorm	42,671	1225	35	75 villages. 100% Tajik
Khash		43,046	243	177	21 villages. Majority Turkmen, minority Tajik
Khwahan	Khwahan	18,734	698	27	46 villages. Predominantly Tajik.
Kishim	Mashhad	91,407	767	119	100 villages. 100% Tajik
Kohistan		18,733	494	38	13 villages. 100% Tajik
Kuf Ab	Qal`eh-ye Kuf	25,243	1,439	18	Predominantly Tajik, some Aimaq.
Keran wa Menjan	Keran wa Menjan	10,761	4,712	2	42 villages. Predominantly Pamiri (Munji), few Tajiks.
Maimay (Darwaz-e Payin)	Jamarj-e Bala	29,893	1,217	25	Predominantly Tajik, some Aimaq.
Nusay (Darwaz-e Bala)	Nusay	26,173	1,589	16	16 villages. Tajik.
Raghistan	Ziraki	44,773	1,321	34	25 villages. 100% Tajik.
Shahri Buzurg	Shahri Buzurg	59,123	942	63	74 villages. 100% Tajik.
Sheghnan	Shughnan	31,487	1,968	16	28 villages. Predominantly Pamiri (Shughni).
Shekay	Jarf	29,760	635	47	38 villages. Tajik, etc.
Shuhada		39,061	1,244	31	62 villages. Predominantly Farsiwan (Tajik, Aimaq), few Pamiri (Ishkashimi).
Tagab		31,753	1,401	23	Mixed Tajik and Baloch.
Tishkan		33,746	821	41	57 villages. 100% Tajik.
Wakhan	Khandud	16,873	10,930	2	110 villages. Majority Pamiri (Wakhi), minority Kyrgyz.
Warduj		24,712	684	36	45 villages. 100% Tajik.
Yaftali Sufla		59,654	606	98	93 villages. 100% Tajik.
Yamgan		29,096	1,744	17	39 villages. 100% Tajik
Yawan		36,669	431	85	100% Tajik.
Zebak	Zebak	8,902	2,057	4	62 villages. Majority Pamiri, minority Tajik.
Badakhshan		1,054,087	44,836	24	85.4% Farsiwan (85.3% Tajiks, 0.1% Aimaqs), 7.2% Pamiris (incl. 1.5% Ishkashimi, 1.0% Munji, 3.0% Shughni, 1.1% Wakhi), 5.4% Turkmens, 1.5% Baloch, 0.5% Kyrgyz. (Note: "Predominantely" is interpreted as 99%, "majority" as 70%, "mixed" as 1/(number of ethnicities) and "minority" as 30%.)

=== Security ===
The security in Badakhshan is influenced by its remote terrain, limited infrastructure, and proximity to international borders. While Fayzabad and some district centers maintain relative stability under government control, many rural areas faced challenges such as armed groups, smuggling, and occasional insurgent activity.

Security dynamics have also changed since the takeover of the Taliban. While large-scale conventional fighting has declined, the province continues to experience localized armed resistance, internal power struggles, and tensions linked to control over natural resources, particularly mining areas. The border regions, especially near Tajikistan and the Wakhan Corridor, remain strategically sensitive and subject to heightened security oversight.

== Economy ==
The economy of Badakhshan is largely subsistence-based, heavily influenced by its mountainous terrain, remote location, and limited infrastructure. Most households combine multiple livelihood strategies to sustain themselves, including agriculture, livestock herding, small-scale trade, and mining. Seasonal labor migration to other provinces or neighboring countries is also common, particularly in winter months when high-altitude villages become isolated. Cash income is generally low, and many families rely on barter or informal local markets to acquire essential goods.

=== Agriculture and animal husbandry ===
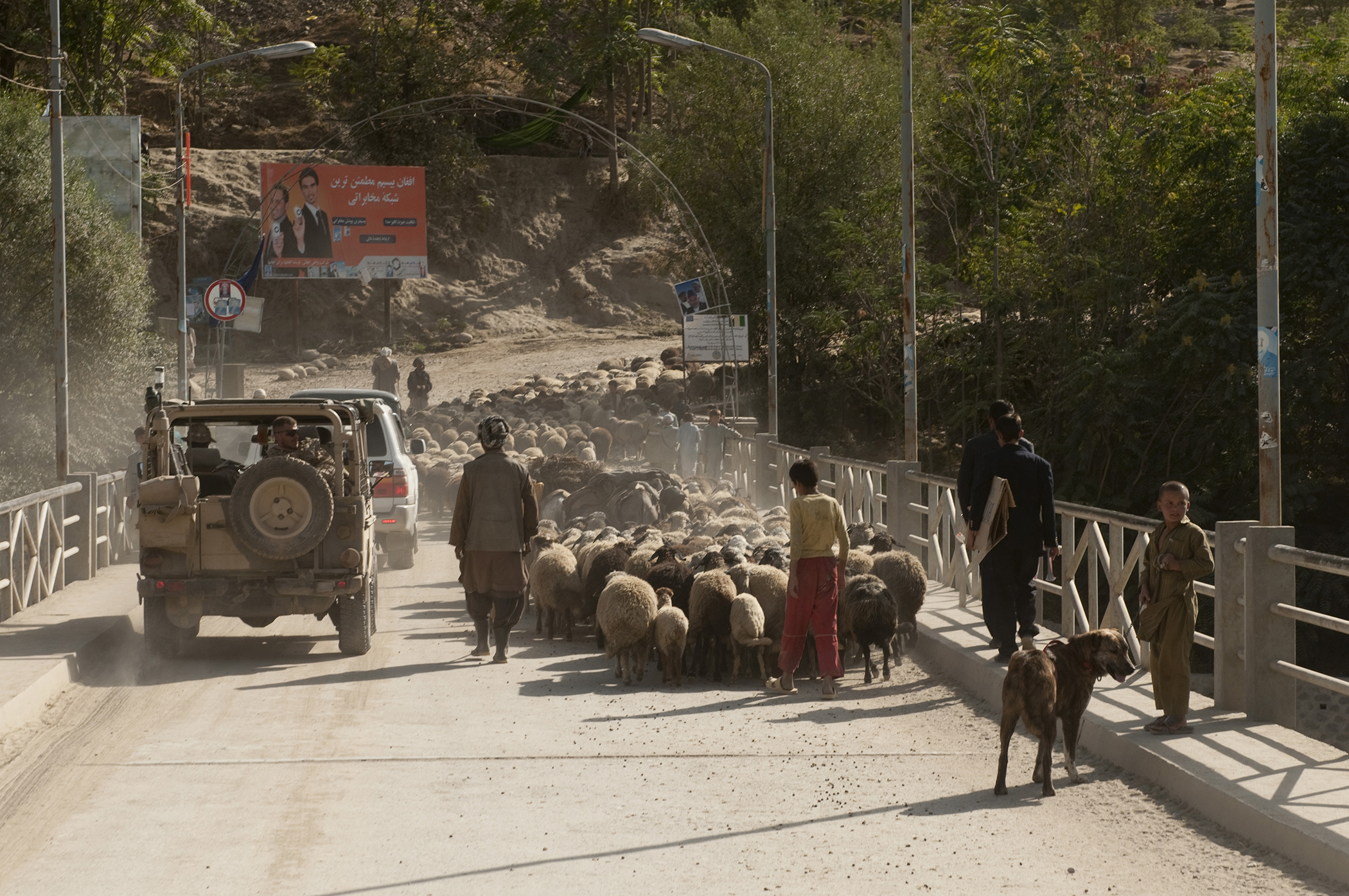
A shepherd herds his sheep through a village in Fayzabad (2009)

Agriculture dominates rural livelihoods, though the harsh climate and rugged terrain limit arable land to valley floors and lower mountain slopes. Crops include wheat, barley, maize, potatoes, and legumes, which are mainly grown for household consumption. Orchards produce fruit and nut varieties such as apricots, apples, mulberries, walnuts, and almonds, which provide both food and occasional trade income. Livestock is a vital component of the local economy, including sheep, goats, cattle, yaks, and poultry, often raised through transhumance, moving animals to summer pastures at high elevations. Before the ban in 2022, some farmers also cultivated opium poppy on small, remote plots as a cash crop, primarily in isolated valleys where state oversight is limited. Animal products such as milk, cheese, wool, and meat contribute directly to household nutrition and, to a lesser extent, local markets.

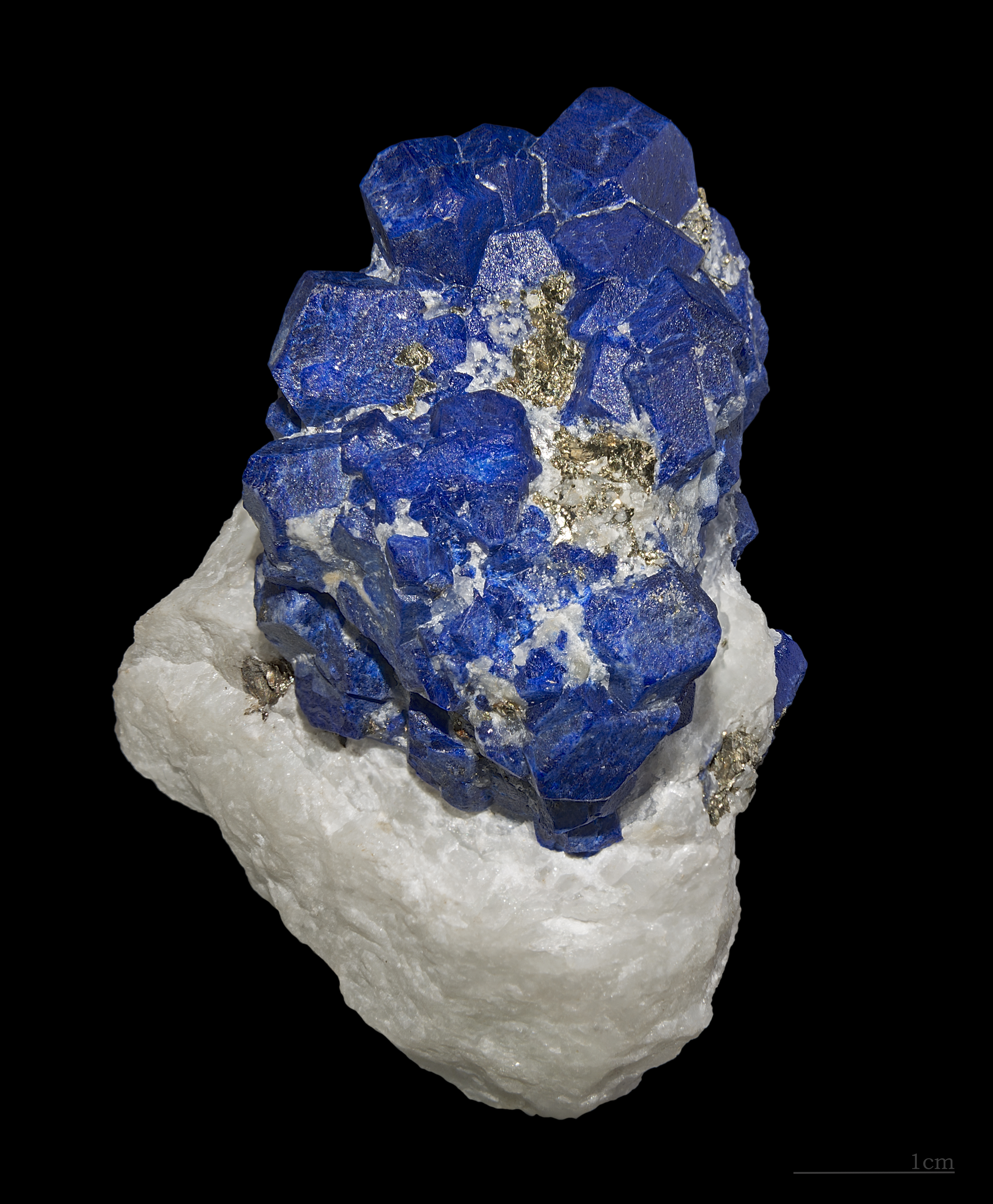
Classic lazurite specimen from Sar-i Sang

=== Mining ===
Badakhshan was historically known for its mineral wealth, most famously the Sar-i Sang lapis lazuli mines, which have been in operation for over 6,000 years and remain a primary source of provincial income. The region also contains emeralds, rubies, salt, marble, and other semi-precious stones, as well as significant gold deposits. Extraction, however, is often small-scale, informal, and heavily influenced by seasonal access, tribal control, and security conditions. Mining activities frequently provide temporary employment for local laborers, but the profits are unevenly distributed, and many operations are not formally regulated.

=== Trade ===
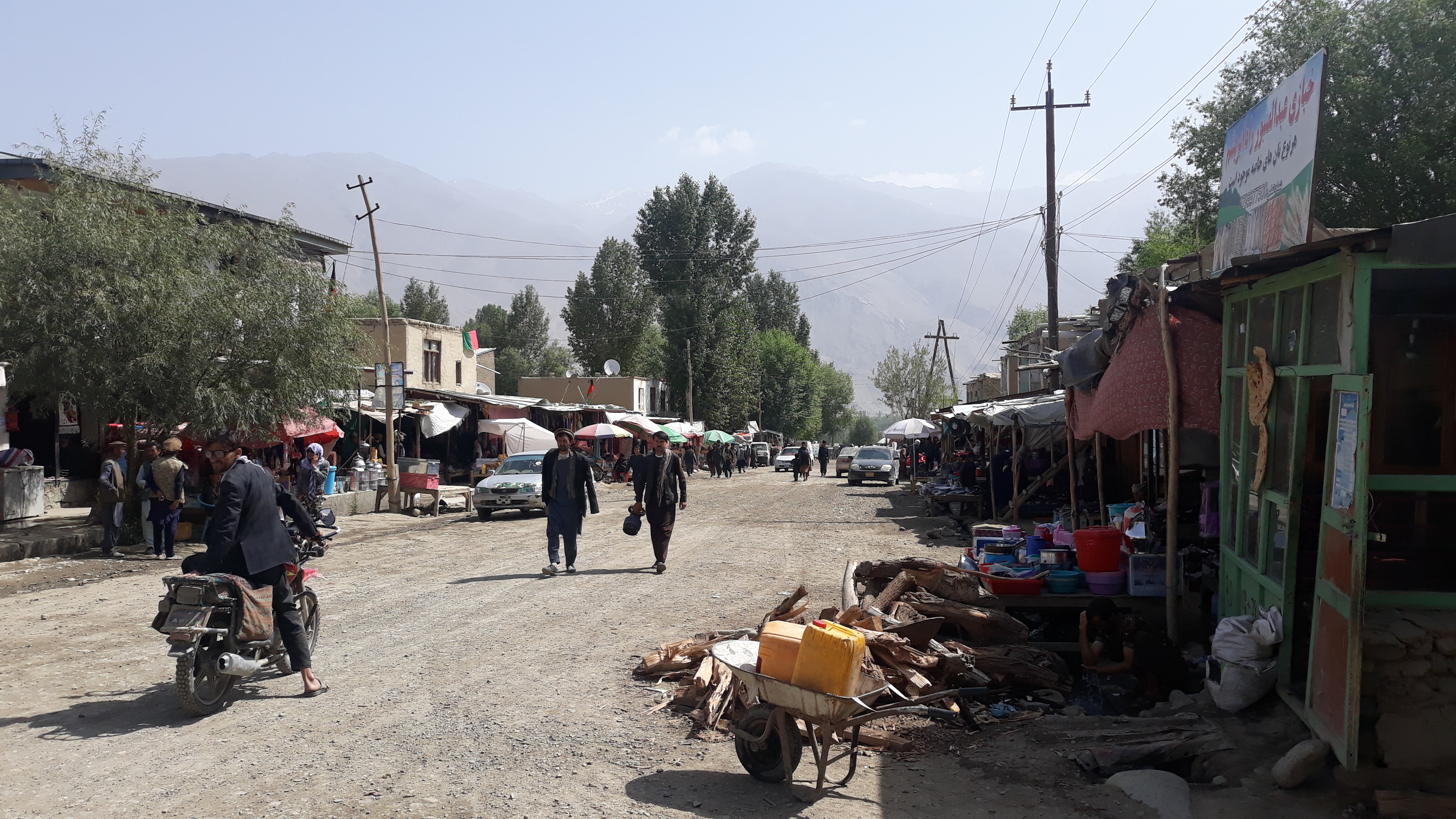
Small market in Ishkashim (2019)

Local trade is limited and seasonal, reflecting the province's geographic isolation and harsh winter conditions. Markets are concentrated in Fayzabad, Baharak, Ishkashim, Jurm, and Kishim, facilitating trade in agricultural produce, livestock, handicrafts, and minerals. Cross-border trade with Tajikistan, Pakistan, and historically China through the Wakhan Corridor occurs, mainly involving small caravans or trucks transporting dry fruits, nuts, textiles, and local handicrafts. Informal trade networks remain essential, as official infrastructure for customs and commerce is sparse, especially in remote districts.

=== Energy and irrigation ===
Energy infrastructure is limited. Most households rely on small hydroelectric plants, wood-burning stoves, and river water, with few areas connected to a central grid. Traditional qanat (underground irrigation channels) and small canals supply water for agriculture in valley areas, but larger-scale irrigation projects are largely absent due to steep terrain and financial constraints. Seasonal snowmelt contributes to river flow and irrigation in spring, but unpredictable climate events such as floods or landslides often disrupt water supply.

=== Tourism ===
Tourism is minimal due to security concerns, limited infrastructure, and seasonal inaccessibility. Nevertheless, the province offers considerable potential for eco, adventure, and cultural tourism, particularly in the Wakhan Corridor, Pamir Mountains, and historic lapis lazuli mines. Visitors are mostly limited to scientists, NGO workers, and adventurous mountaineers, as formal tourist services and accommodations are scarce.

=== Communication ===
Telecommunications have gradually improved, with mobile phone networks, satellite connections, and some internet access reaching urban centers and select district towns. However, many remote villages remain without coverage, relying on radio communication or couriers for external contact. Postal services are minimal, and access to up-to-date information is uneven across the province.

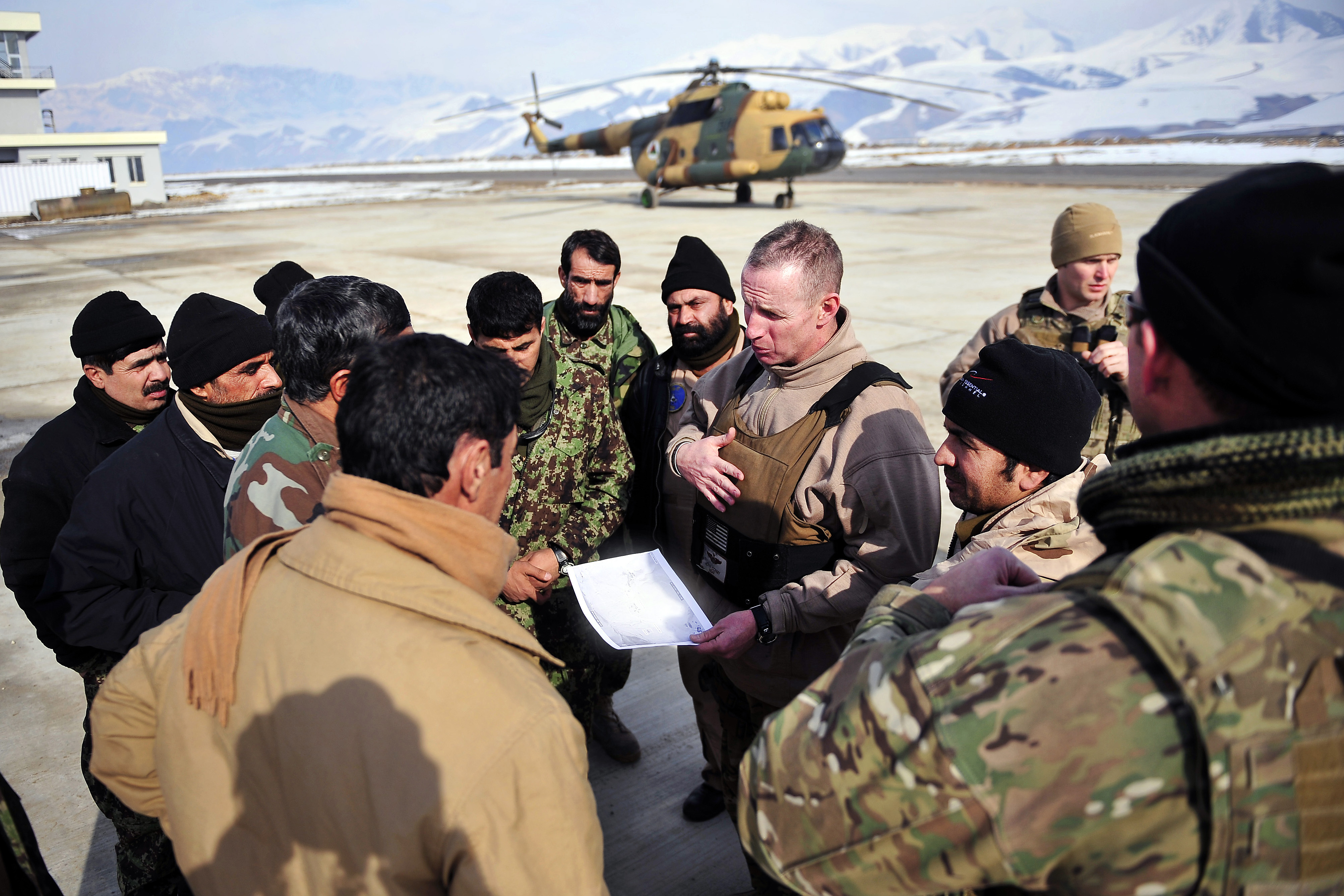
An American lieutenant colonel conducting a pre-flight briefing at Fayzabad Airport (2012)

=== Transportation and infrastructure ===
Road networks are sparse and often impassable in winter due to snow, landslides, and river flooding. Primary highways connect major towns such as Fayzabad, while smaller dirt roads link remote villages. The province has no rail connections, and air travel is limited to small airports such as Fayzabad Airport, used primarily for government, humanitarian, or occasional commercial flights to Kabul. Pack animals, motorcycles, buses, and private vehicles remain critical for local transport, especially in high-altitude and isolated districts.

== Demographics ==
=== Population ===
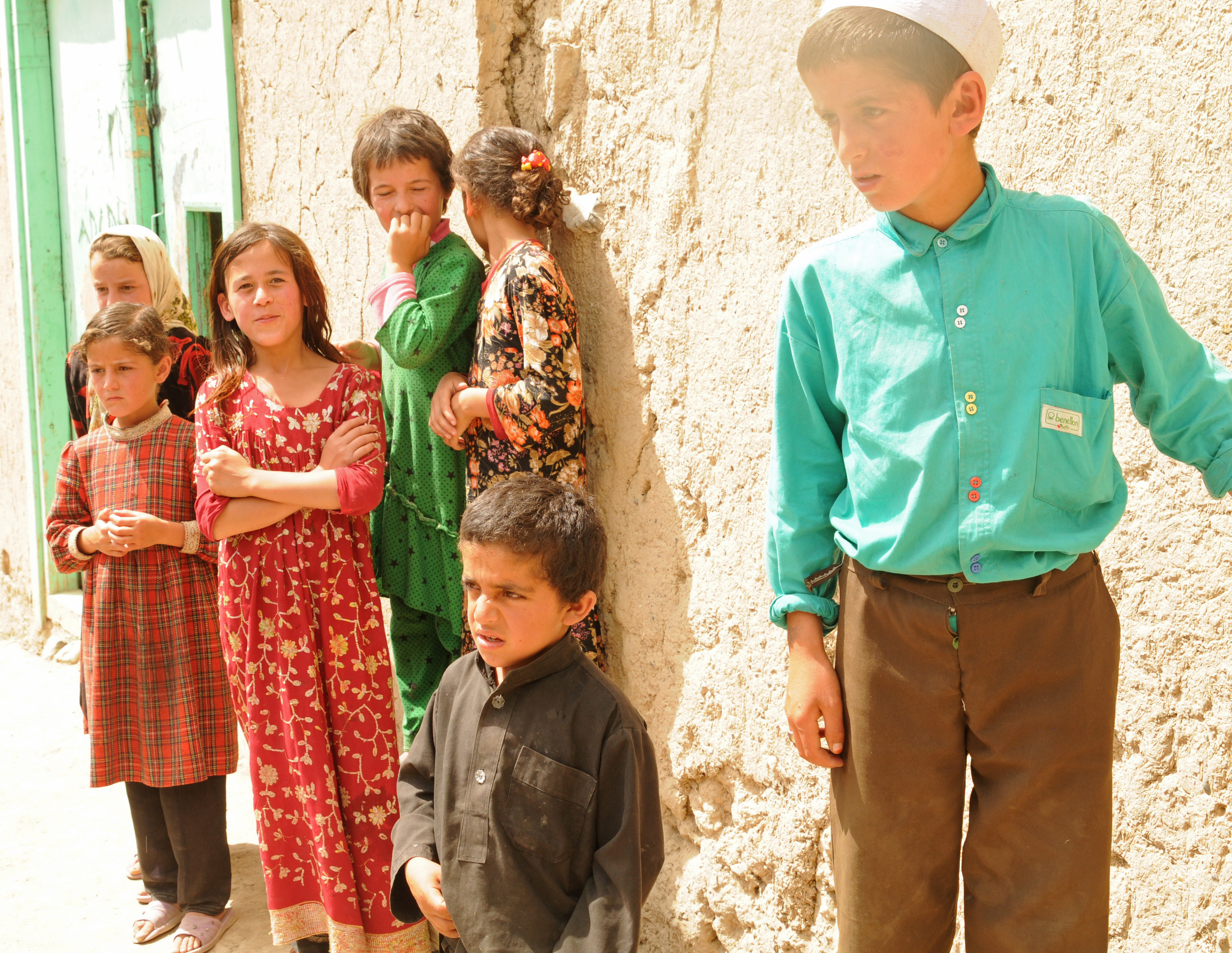
Children in Badakhshan (2012)

Badakhshan has an estimated population of approximately 1.1 million people as of 2023, spread across urban centers, small towns, and remote villages. A minority of the population lives in urban areas, primarily in Fayzabad, the provincial capital, and other towns such as Baharak, Ishkashim, and Jurm, while the majority resides in rural villages throughout the province. Poverty is widespread, particularly in high-altitude and remote districts, with a multidimensional poverty index of 0.326, and 31.6% of the population living in severe poverty as of 2023. Limited access to infrastructure, healthcare, education, and economic opportunities contributes to high vulnerability, and seasonal isolation due to snow, landslides, and river flooding further exacerbates living conditions.

=== Ethnicity, languages, and religion ===
The ethnic composition of Badakhshan is diverse, with identities often overlapping, reflecting historical migration, trade, and cultural interchange. The majority are Tajiks, including Isma'ili Tajiks primarily in the Wakhan Corridor and highland valleys, who practice Isma'ili Shi'a Islam, while Sunni Tajiks predominate in other districts, as well as Isma'ili Pamiris (historically known as "Mountain Tajiks") speaking various Eastern Iranian languages such as Shughni, Wakhi, and Rushani. Smaller groups include Uzbeks, Kyrgyz, and Pashtuns. Many ethnic groups are bilingual or multilingual, using Dari as a lingua franca, while Pashto is spoken in smaller pockets. The religious landscape is similarly layered, with Sunni Islam dominant in most areas, Isma'ili Shi'a communities concentrated in mountainous districts, and occasional adherence to local traditions. Intermarriage and overlapping identities mean that ethnic and religious boundaries are fluid rather than sharply defined.

Estimated ethnolinguistic and -religious composition
Ethnicity	Sunni	Ismaili	Uzbek	Pashtun	Others	Sources
Period	Tajik	Pamiri	Uzbek	Pashtun	Others	Sources

2004–2021 (Islamic Republic)	<60 – 61%	10%	10%	10 – 20%	6%	∅
2020 EU	1st		–	2nd	–	–
2019 AA	78%			20%	–	–
2018 CSSF (Note: Demographic information is based on data from 2018.)	majority		∅ (Note: incl. Wakhi.)	∅	–	∅ (Note: incl. Kyrgyz.)
2018 UN	<60%	20%		10 – 15%	∅	∅ (Note: incl. Kyrgyz, Hazara, and Baloch.)
2015 CP	77%		–	12%	–	–
2011 UCD	majority		minority	minority	–	∅
2011 USA	majority		–	–	–	–
2011 PRT	77%			12%	∅ (Note: excl. Kochi.)	∅ (Note: imcl. Nuristani and Turkmen.)
2009 UNHCR	61%	10%	10%	12%	6%	–

Legend:
- ∅: Ethnicity mentioned in source but not quantified
- –: Ethnicity not mentioned specifically
- Source abbreviations: Empirical sources: AA – Federal Foreign Office of Germany, Government sources: CP – Colombo Plan, PRT – Provincial Reconstruction Team of the United States government, UNHCR – United Nations High Commissioner for Refugees, UN – United Nations Assistance Mission in Afghanistan, Editorial sources: CSSF – Center for the Scientific Study of Families, UCD – University of California, Davis, (Note: Produced at UCD as part of the Regional Rural Economic Regeneration Strategies subproject of the eAfghan Ag project, supported by USAID.) USA – United States Army

=== Education ===
Educational infrastructure in Badakhshan is limited but gradually expanding. Primary and secondary schools are present in most district centers, providing basic education to children, although attendance is often affected by seasonal isolation, economic pressures, and security concerns. The provincial capital, Fayzabad, hosts the most significant higher education institutions, including Badakhshan University, teacher training institutes, and vocational schools, which serve students from across the province. Since 2021, madrasas have become increasingly prominent, providing religious education and, in some cases, basic literacy and vocational skills, particularly in rural and remote districts. Literacy rates remain low, especially among women, with the most recent available estimates from 2011 indicating an overall literacy rate of around 26% and an overall net enrolment rate for school-age children of approximately 68%. Formal education generally follows national curricula, but access, quality, and continuity remain uneven.

=== Health ===
Healthcare infrastructure in Badakhshan is limited and concentrated in urban centers. The Fayzabad Provincial Hospital serves as the main referral hospital for the province, offering general medical services and limited specialized care. District hospitals and clinics are present in other major towns, providing basic health services such as maternal and child care, vaccinations, and treatment for common illnesses. Many villages, however, remain without permanent medical facilities and rely on mobile health teams, local health posts, NGOs, and traditional healers. Common challenges include high infant and maternal mortality, malnutrition, and limited access to clean water and sanitation, with the most recent available estimates from 2011 indicating that 21% of households had access to clean drinking water and 2% of births were attended by a skilled birth attendant. Humanitarian aid and international health programs supplement provincial resources, but seasonal isolation and security constraints often hinder consistent service delivery.

== Culture ==
=== Music and dances ===
Music in Badakhshan is characterized by a variety of traditional folk styles unique to the province, reflecting Pamiri, Tajik, and Uzbek influences. One notable local style is qataghani, which features rhythmic melodies often played on the dambura and rubab and is traditionally performed during weddings, seasonal celebrations, and social gatherings. Other popular instruments include the ghijak and various flutes, which are used in both solo and ensemble performances. The province also preserves distinctive vocal traditions, including improvised poetic songs and laments. Some notable musicians, such as Mir Maftoon, have helped popularize Badakhshan's traditional music in the country.

=== Dresses and attire ===
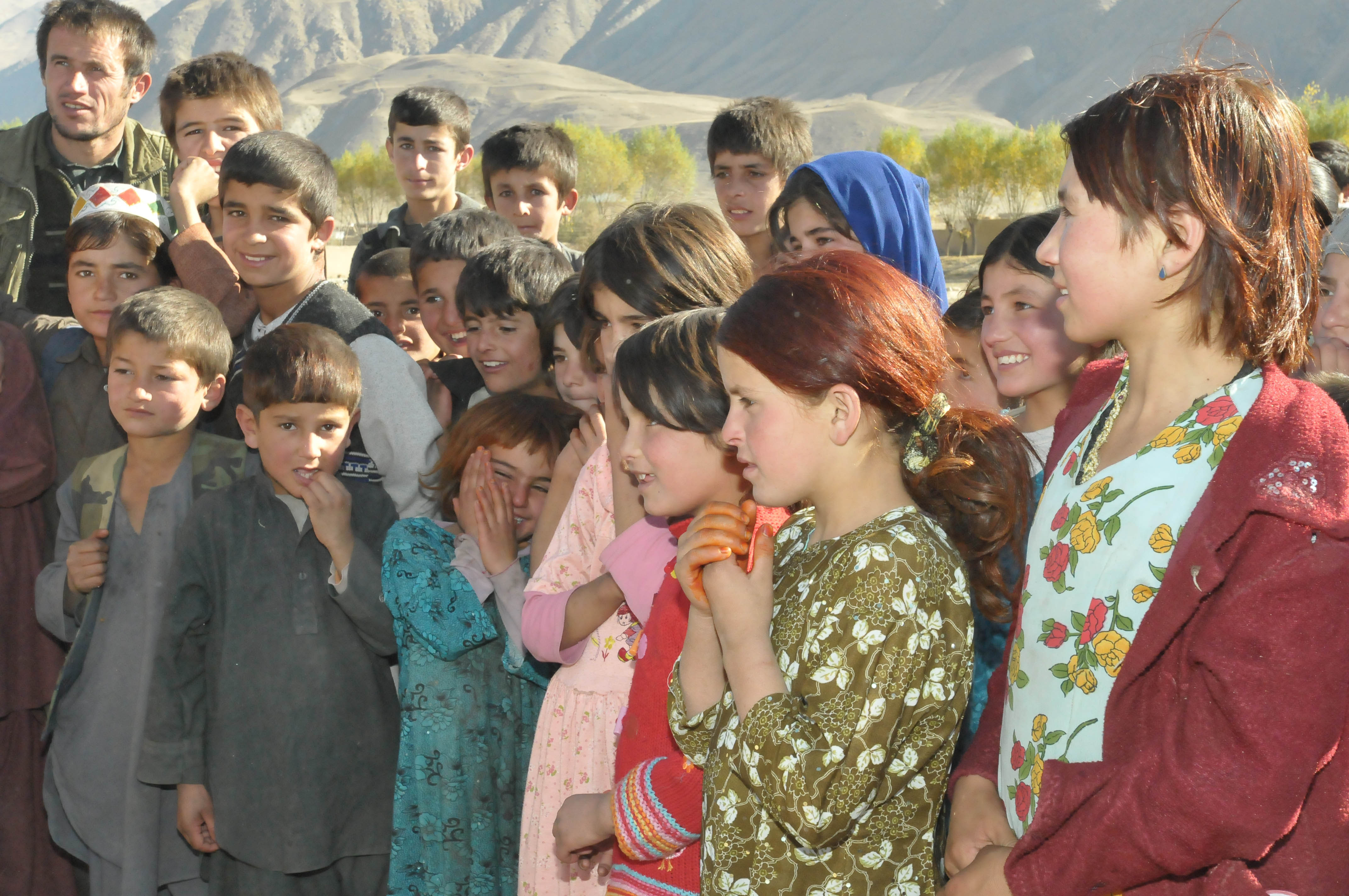
Children in a village community in Badhakshan wearing traditional regional attire (2010)

Traditional attire in Badakhshan reflects the cultural identity of its ethnicities, particularly among Pamiri and Isma'ili Tajik communities, as well as the northern region of Afghanistan in general. Men often wear chapans and distinctive embroidered or felt hats called tubeteika, which are characteristic of the region. Women's clothing includes long dresses with headscarves or veils, sometimes decorated with embroidered patterns specific to their local community. These garments are primarily worn in rural areas and during cultural or religious occasions, reflecting both regional identity and adaptation to the mountainous climate.

=== Cuisine ===
The cuisine reflects the mountainous environment and agricultural products of the province, with several foods considered locally distinctive. The region is known for its walnuts, apricots, and mulberries, which are commonly used in both snacks and traditional dishes. Mountain rivers provide freshwater fish, particularly trout, which is often grilled or cooked with local herbs. Dairy products such as yogurt and soft cheeses are produced in rural communities and feature in meals. Sweet treats occasionally incorporate dried fruits and nuts, highlighting ingredients native to Badakhshan. While many staple Afghan dishes are also consumed, these locally sourced ingredients are especially associated with the province.

=== Architecture, art and literature ===
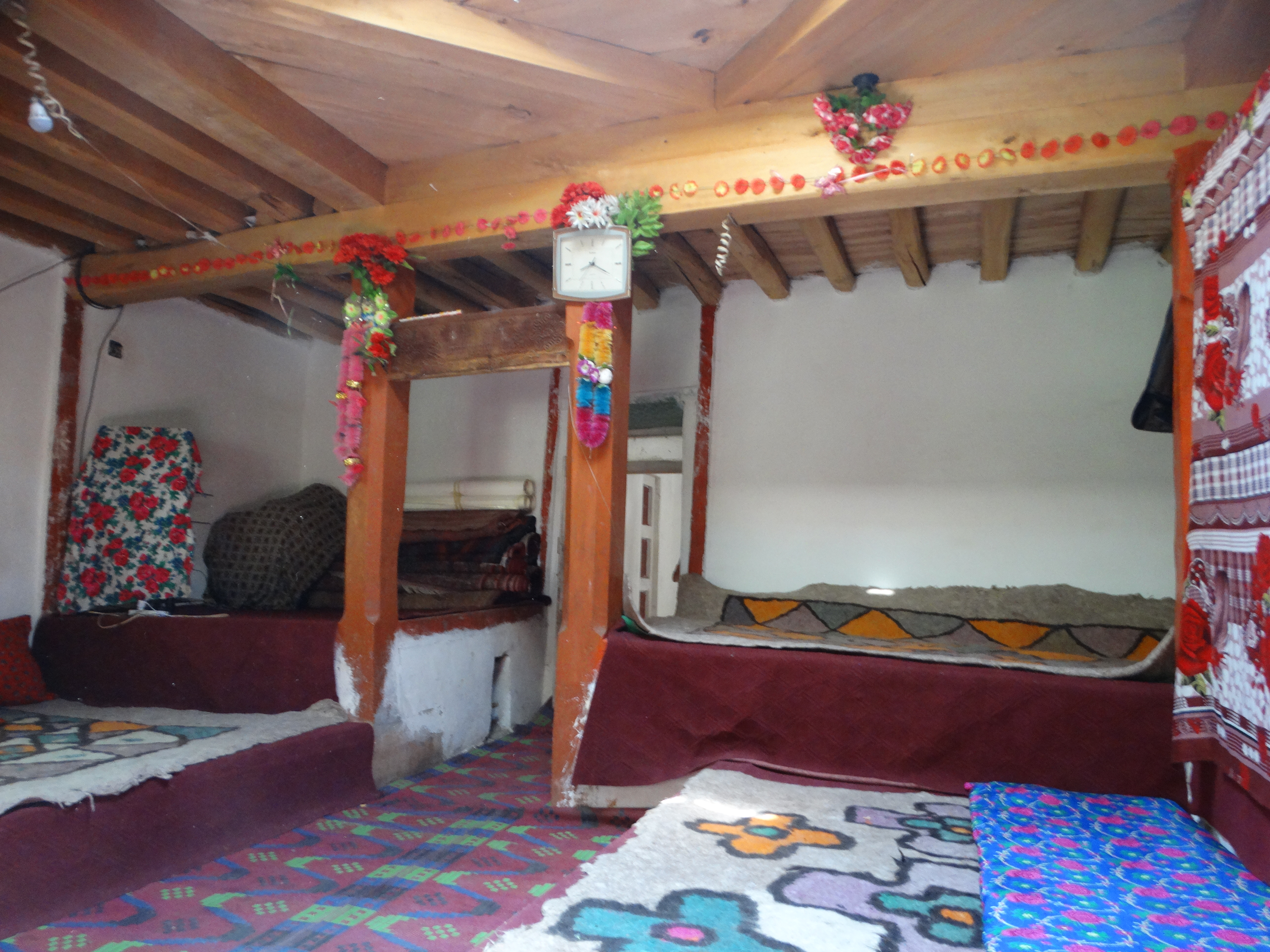
Interior of a traditional Pamiri house (2019)

Architecture is closely linked to the province's mountainous environment and local cultural heritage. Residential buildings are commonly constructed with mudbrick or stone, adapted to steep slopes and harsh winters, while timber-framed houses in high-altitude valleys provide insulation and flexibility against seismic activity. Religious structures, including mosques and shrines, serve as community and spiritual centers. Fortifications and mud or stone watchtowers remain scattered throughout the province, reflecting historical defensive needs.

Local art forms are closely tied to daily life and regional resources. Traditional handicrafts include embroidery, felt work, and wood carving, often featuring geometric and floral motifs specific to local communities. Badakhshan is also known for its lapis lazuli and other gemstones, which are used in decorative arts and jewelry, reflecting a long-standing tradition of gem cutting and ornamentation in the region.

Literary traditions are largely oral, with local communities preserving poetry, storytelling, and epic songs in Dari and Pamiri languages. Oral literature often reflects historical events, moral lessons, and social values, passed down through generations during communal gatherings. Historical literary figures from the region like Nasir Khusraw, Makhfi Badakhshi, and Nūr al-Dīn Jaʿfar Badakhshī contributed to Persian poetry and philosophy.

=== Media, entertainment and festivities ===
Due to the remote and mountainous geography of the province, media infrastructure is limited. Local radio stations serve as the main channels for news, cultural programming, and educational content, while television and internet access are primarily available in urban centers such as Fayzabad. In cities, social media platforms are increasingly used to share information and cultural content, although rural districts often experience limited connectivity.

Traditional forms of entertainment remain central to community life, with storytelling, folk music performances, and providing both social engagement and cultural education. Formal entertainment venues, such as cinemas or theaters, are largely absent, and leisure activities largely rely on community-organized events or family gatherings, shaped by both cultural practices and geographic constraints.

Entertainment in the province continues to rely largely on traditional forms, including storytelling and folk music performances, which are integral to social life and cultural education. Seasonal or religious gatherings play an important role, with nowruz being widely observed and regional events like the Saib Rakhsh cultural festival highlighting local arts, music, and crafts.

=== Places of interest ===
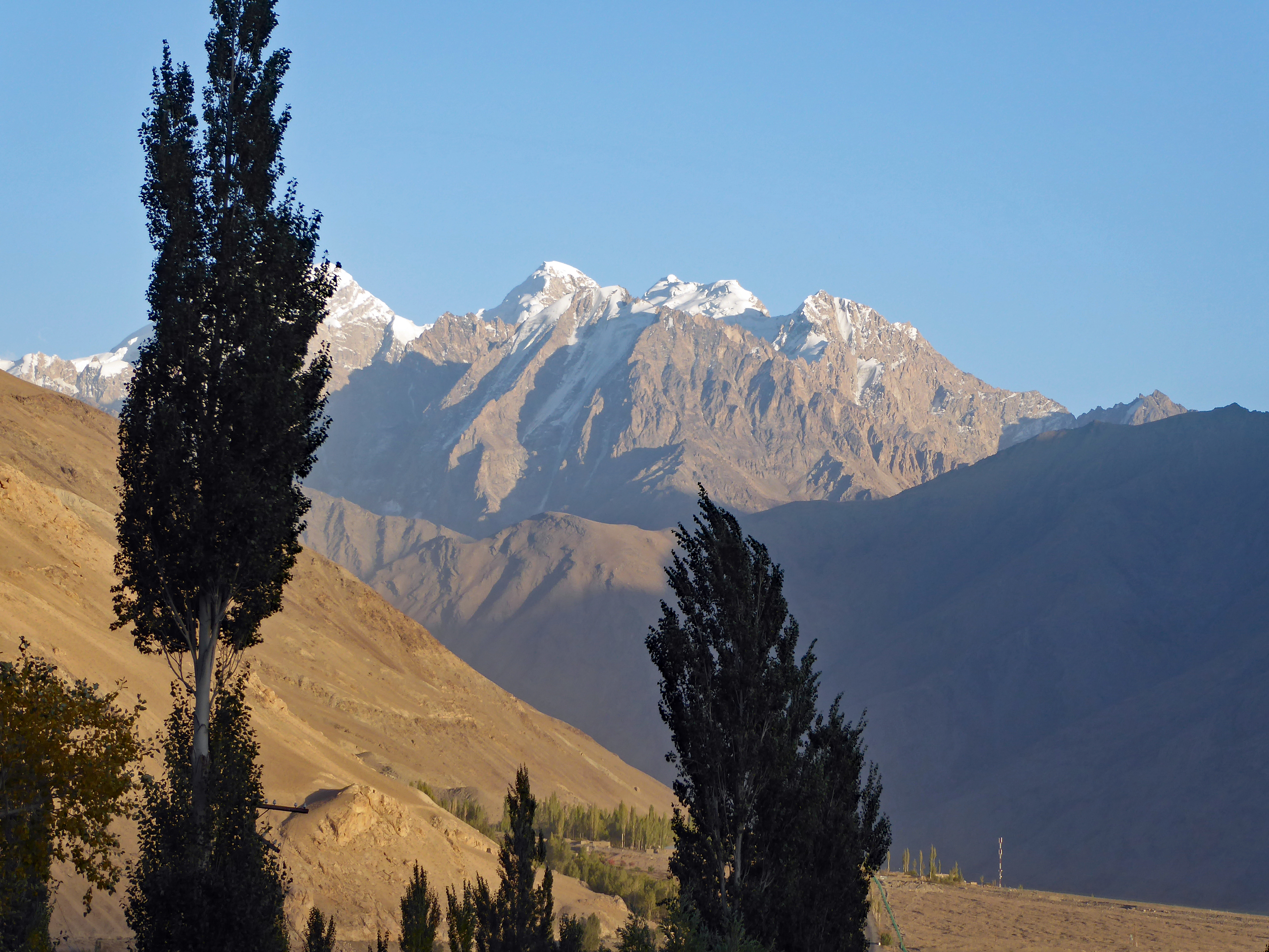
View on the Hindu Kush mountain range from Ishkashim (2016)

Badakhshan features a variety of natural and historical sites that reflect its mountainous terrain, cultural heritage, and strategic location. The Wakhan Corridor is notable for its high-altitude landscapes, alpine meadows, and unique wildlife. Fayzabad, the provincial capital, contains several historic mosques, bazaars, and community centers that illustrate local architectural and social traditions.

Other points of interest include ancient fortresses and watchtowers, and shrine complexes scattered across the province, which hold cultural and religious significance. Rivers such as the Panj and Kokcha offer scenic views and opportunities for fishing, while valleys like Shighnan and Ishkashim provide insight into rural life and traditional agricultural practices.

=== Sports ===
Traditional physical activities include horseback riding, which has historical significance as both transport and recreation, and archery, which remains practiced in some communities during festivals or local competitions. Mountain climbing and trekking have long been part of local culture, particularly in the Wakhan Corridor and Pamir highlands, where residents navigate high-altitude passes as part of daily life.

Modern team sports are increasingly popular in urban centers. Cricket is played at the provincial level, with clubs participating in regional tournaments and youth development programs. Provincial competitions regularly feature a Badakhshan provincial team competing against other provinces. In the Shpageeza Cricket League, Badakhshan and other northeastern provinces are represented through the Pamir Zalmi. During the period of the Islamic Republic, Mawjhai Amu FC served as the regional football team representing Badakhshan together with Kunduz, Takhar, and Baghlan in the Afghan Premier League.

== Notable people ==
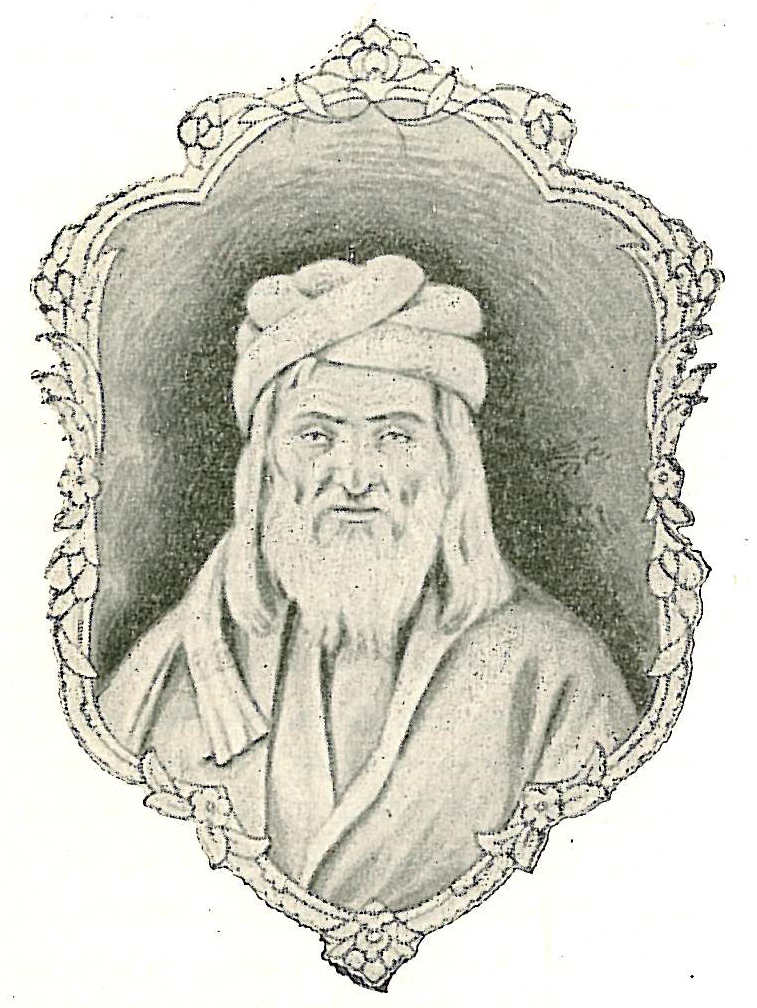
Nasir Khusraw spent the last decades of his life in Badakhshan

=== Historical figures ===
- Nūr al-Dīn Jaʿfar Badakhshī, 14th-century disciple of the eminent Central Asian Ṣūfī shaykh Sayyid ʿAlī Hamadānī
- Makhfi Badakhshi, Persian poet, lived and died in Badakhshan
- Shah Badakhshi, 17th-century Muslim Sufi of the Qadiri order, from Araska in Rustaq area in Badakhshan
- Mir Yar Beg, 19th-century ruler of Badakhshan
- Nasir Khusraw, 11th-century Persian poet, philosopher and Isma'ili scholar, died in Yamgan, Badakhshan
- Bairam Khan, 16th-century important military commander, and later commander-in-chief of the Mughal army, a powerful statesman and regent at the court of the Mughal emperors, Humayun and Akbar
- Sultan Muhammad, 15th-century ruler of Badakhshan

=== Modern figures ===
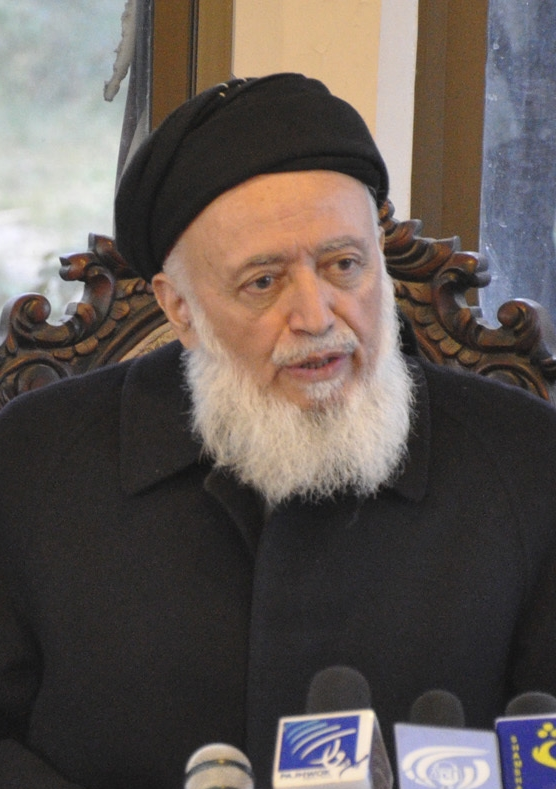
Burhanuddin Rabbani, political head of the Northern Alliance

- Abdul Raof Arghandiwal, former officer of the Afghan Army
- Abdul Azim Badakhshi, mixed martial arts (MMA) athlete
- Tahir Badakhshi, political activist
- Qari Fasihuddin, Chief of General Staff of the Islamic Emirate of Afghanistan
- Din Mohammad Hanif, Minister of Economy of the Islamic Emirate of Afghanistan
- Fawzia Koofi, women's rights activist and former MP
- Maziar Kouhyar, professional footballer, first Afghan to play professionally in the United Kingdom
- Mir Maftoon, musician
- Shamsuddin Pahlawan, politician of the Islamic Emirate of Afghanistan
- Abdul Latif Pedram, political activist and candidate for Afghanistan's presidency
- Burhanuddin Rabbani, leader of the Jamiat-e Islami political party and former president of Afghanistan
- Mansour Sarwari, bronze medalist in Kurash wrestling in the 2018 Asian Games
- Qadam Shah Shahim, former Chief of staff of the Afghan Army

== See also ==
- Dorah Pass
