= Badakhshan =

Historical region in Central Asia

Badakhshan is a historical region in Central Asia. The extent of the territory defined as Badakhshan has fluctuated throughout its history; today it chiefly comprises Badakhshan Province in northeastern Afghanistan and Gorno-Badakhshan Autonomous Region in eastern Tajikistan.

Outline of the Badakhshan region in Central Asia, spanning parts of Afghanistan and Tajikistan

== Name ==
Badakhshan Mountainous Autonomous Region in Tajikistan

Badakhshan Province in Afghanistan

The name "Badakhshan" (Persian: بدخشان, Badaxšân; Pashto: بدخشان; Tajik: Бадахшон, Badakhshon; Russian: Бадахшан) is derived from the Sasanian official title bēdaxš or badaxš, which may be from an earlier *pati-axša; the suffix -ān indicates that the country belonged, or had been assigned as a fief, to a person holding the rank of a badaxš.

== Demographics ==
Badakhshan has a diverse ethno-linguistic and religious community of Badakhshanites. Tajiks and Pamiris are in the majority, while a minority of Kyrgyzs, Uzbeks, and Hazaras also inhabit some villages. There are also groups of speakers of several Pamir languages of the Eastern Iranian language group. During the 20th century, within Gorno-Badakhshan Autonomous Region in Tajikistan, the speakers of Pamir languages put forward their own separate ethnic identity as Pamiris. The Pamiri people were not officially recognized as a separate ethnic group in Tajikistan, but Tajikistan Pamiri movements and associations have been formed. The main religious sects of Badakhshan are Isma'ili Islam and Sunni Islam; Nasir Khusraw propagated Isma'ilism there in 11th century. The music of Badakhshan is an important part of the region's cultural heritage.

== History ==
=== Early history ===
Badakhshan was an important trading center during antiquity. The only then-known deposits of lapis lazuli were mined there as early as the second half of the 4th millennium BC. Badakhshan was an important region, crossed by the Silk Road. Its significance was its geo-economic role in the silk trade and ancient commodities transactions between the East and West.

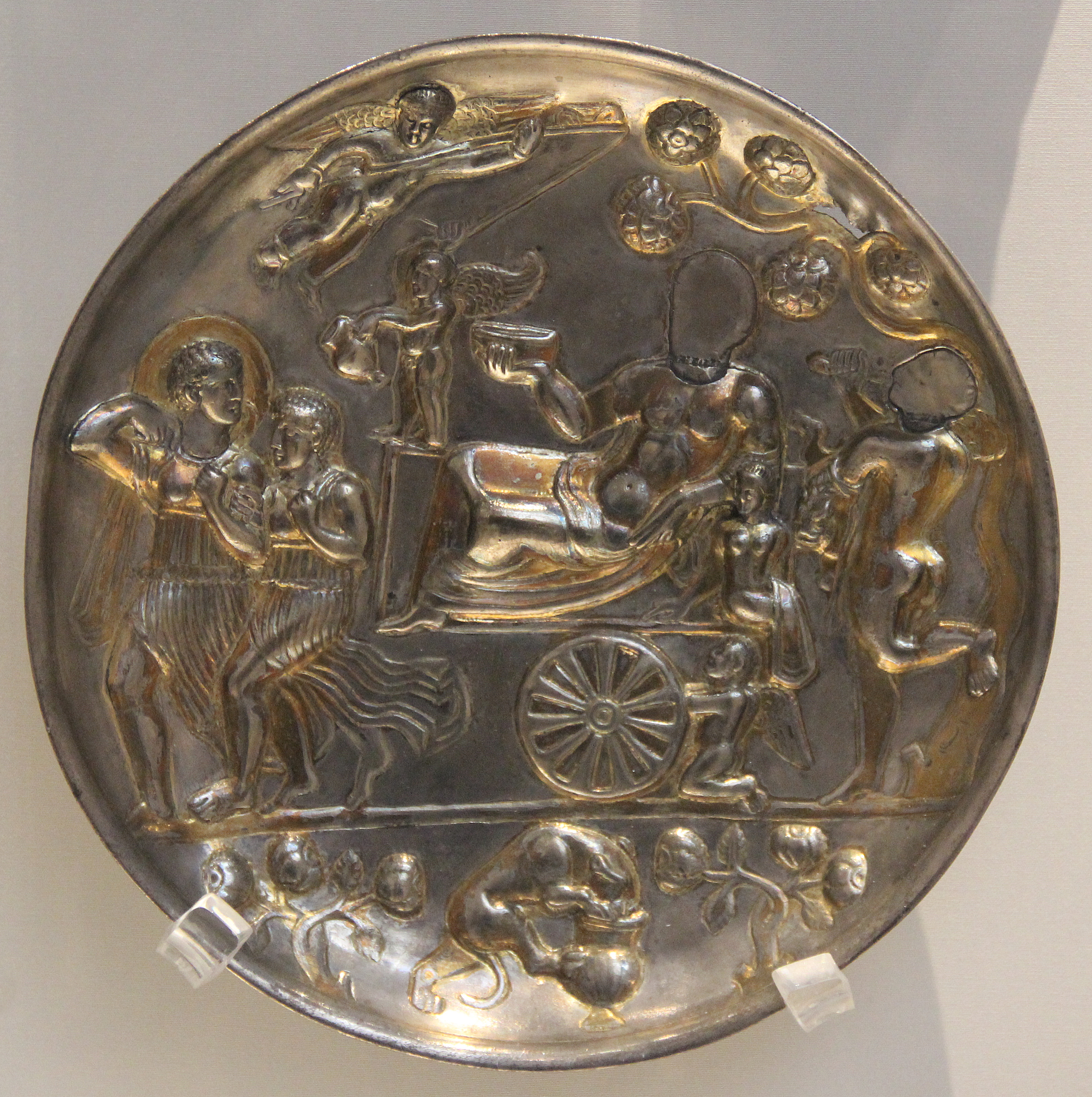
Badakshan patera, "Triumph of Bacchus", British Museum. (1st–4th century CE).

Marco Polo wrote that Balas ruby could be found under the "Syghinan" (Shighnan) mountain in Badashan/Badakshan. "Balas" is derived from Balascia, the ancient name for Badakhshan, a region in Central Asia in the upper valley of the Panj River, one of the principal tributaries of the Oxus River. However, "Balascia" itself may be derived from the Sanskrit bālasūryaka, which translates as "crimson-coloured morning sun". Mines in the Gorno Badakhshan region of Tajikistan constituted for centuries the main source for red and pink spinels.

The excavations along the banks of the Amu Darya show evidence of trade with the early civilizations of the Ancient Near East in the 4th–3rd millennia BC.

Through the Khyber Pass, precious stones and rubies were transported to all corners of the Middle East for sale. Jewelry and clothing decorated with rubies from the 3rd millennium BC have been discovered in Southeast Asia, Mesopotamia, Egypt, Iran, Indo-China, and even in Western countries. The Badakhshan rubies have been found in Pakistan (Mohenjo-Daro), Egypt (Necropolis of Thebes), and other places. There was a special caravan route from Badakhshan to these civilizations, which introduced Badakhshan to the world in ancient times through these precious stones.

There is also evidence in Badakhshan from the Stone Age. In the Stone Age, construction of new clay huts in Badakhshan began. Later, in the Neolithic period, the tribes of the Middle East, including the Badakhshan, used wooden gates with their heels running over stone holes. Scientists also attribute the appearance of a window for smoke and light to the Neolithic period. Archaeologists call the Neolithic artifacts in Takharistan (Badakhshan) in the historical literature "Mountain Neolithic of Hissar culture". This civilization lasted from the 6th to the 3rd millennium BC.

The Bronze Age in Badakhshan, from the 3rd millennium BC to the 9th-8th centuries BC, was the most important historical stage of development and evolution. The development of productive forces and significant changes in the social system took place during this period. People learned the production and use of minerals, learned how to melt metals to make iron stronger, and began to produce weapons and household items. On this basis, handicrafts developed, and new and large camps were built. Other production activities, such as agriculture, animal husbandry, handicrafts, the emergence of horses and carts, road construction, etc., accelerated the division of society into classes. The construction of shields, sickles, axes, pickaxes, and shovels flourished during this period of bronze.

The great ruby road appeared on the maps of merchants during this period and became known as the Silk Road, which later became a major trade route and served the peoples of different nations until the 17–18th century. Badakhshan was at that time a land called Airyanem Vaejah, and "Varena" in the Avesta refers to a part of Badakhshan in the Khatlon conflict. Badakhshan gained its status among the world civilizations with these two types of precious stones, both in the time of the Elamites, in the time of the Maud, and in the time of the Achaemenids when the roads of communication were so long that the "Road of the King" was 2400 km long, and was used to transport rubies from Badakhshan, turquoise from Khorezm, and jade from Lake Baikal. The mineralogist A. E. Fersman wrote that one stone was known throughout the long history of culture – the bright blue lapis lazuli of Afghanistan (Badakhshan), which was transported by caravan routes to Egypt, China, Rome, and Byzantium. Some scholars claim that the "mountain valley" mentioned by the Greeks was Badakhshan.

=== Early modern history ===
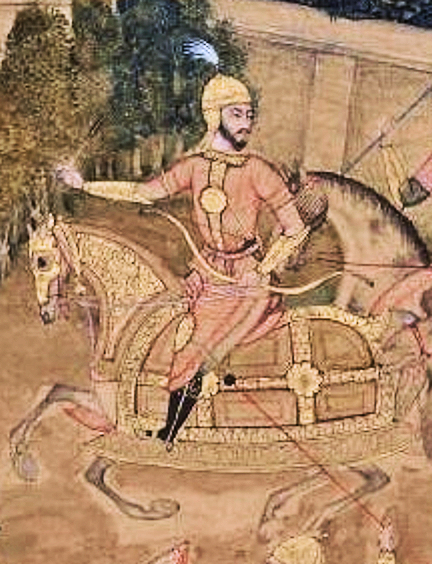
Mirza Sulayman, ruler of Badakhshan, besieging Kabul in 1556-1557

The region was ruled over by the mirs of Badakhshan. Sultan Muhammad of Badakhshan was the last of a series of kings who traced their descent to Alexander the Great. He was killed by Abu Sa'id Mirza, the ruler of Timurid Empire, who took possession of Badakhshan, which after his death fell to his son, Sultan Mahmud Mirza, who had three sons, Baysinghar Mirza, Ali Mirza, and Khan Mirza. When Mahmud died, Amir Khusrau Khan, one of his nobles, blinded Baysinghar Mirza, killed the second prince, and ruled as a usurper. He submitted to the Mughal Emperor Babur in 1504 CE. When Babur took Kandahar in 1506 CE from Shah Beg Arghun, he sent Khan Mirza as governor to Badakhshan. A son was born to Khan Mirza by the name of Mirza Sulaiman in 1514 CE.

After the death of Khan Mirza, Badakhshan was governed for Babur by Prince Humayun, Sultan Wais Khan (Mirza Sulaiman's father-in-law), Prince Hindal Mirza, and Mirza Sulaiman, who held Badakhshan till October 8, 1541, when he had to surrender himself and his son, Mirza Ibrahim, to Prince Kamran Mirza. They were released by Humayun in 1545, and again took possession of Badakhshan. When Humayun had taken Kabul, he made war upon and defeated Mirza Sulaiman who once in possession of his country, had refused to submit; but when the return of Prince Kamran Mirza from Sindh obliged Emperor Humayun to go to Kabul, he reinstated Mirza Sulaiman, who held Badakhshan till 1575. Bent on making conquests, he invaded Balkh in 1560, but had to return. His son, Mirza Ibrahim, was killed in battle.

When Akbar became Mughal Emperor, his stepbrother Mirza Muhammad Hakim's mother had been killed by Shah Abul Ma'ali. Mirza Sulaiman went to Kabul, and had Abul Ma'ali hanged; he then had his own daughter married to Mirza Muhammad Hakim, and appointed Umed Ali, a Badakhshan noble, as Mirza Muhammad Hakim's agent in 1563. But Mirza Muhammad Hakim did not go on well with Mirza Sulaiman, who returned the next year to Kabul with hostile intentions; but Mirza Muhammad Hakim fled Fayzabad and asked Akbar for assistance, so that Mirza Sulaiman, though he had taken Jalalabad, had to return to Badakhshan. He returned to Kabul in 1566, when Akbar's troops had left that country, but retreated on being promised tribute.

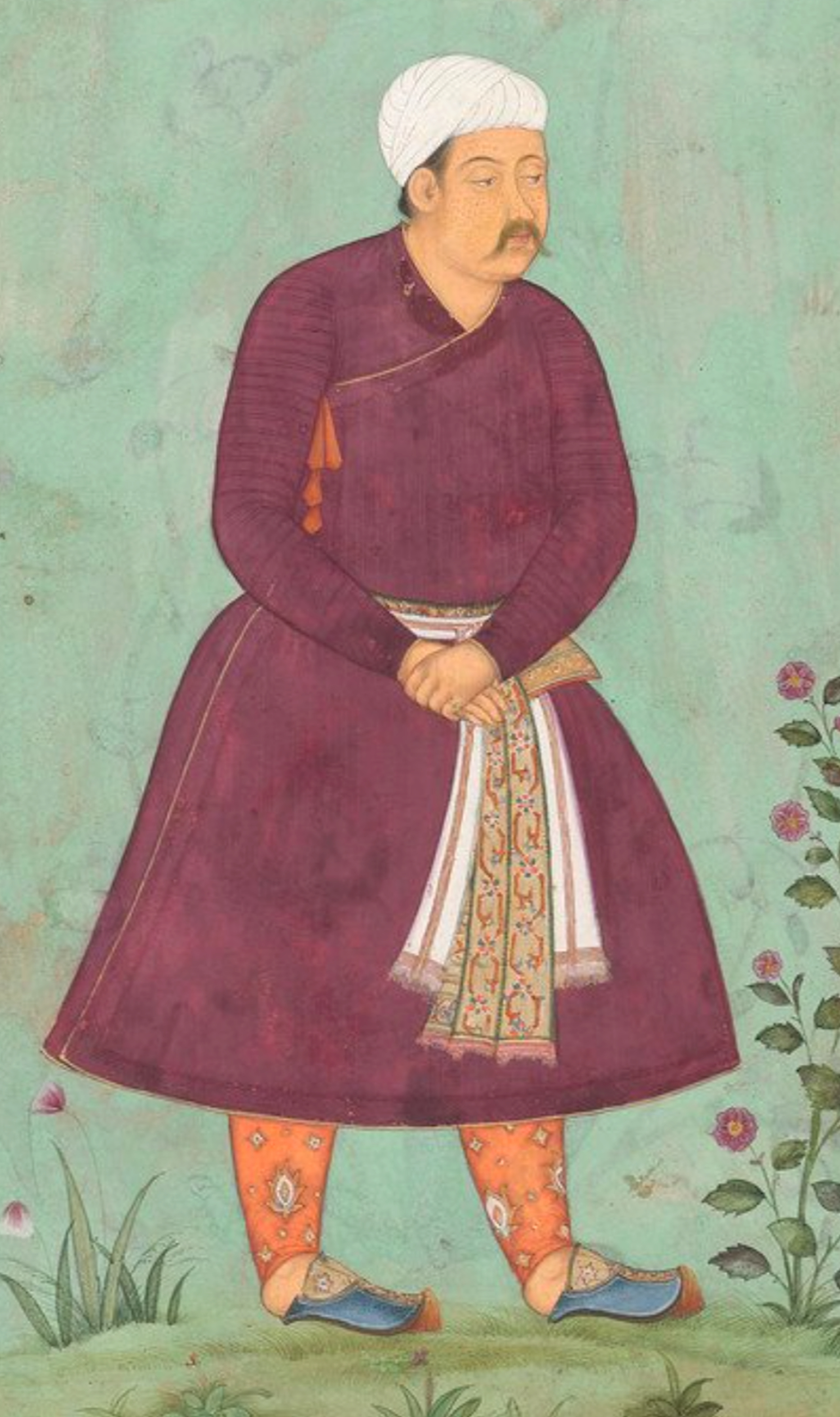
Mirza Shah Rukh (d. 1607–08), grandson of Sulaiman Mirza, and ruler of Badakhshan. Married Akbar's daughter Shakr al-Nisa Begum, and became ruler of Malwa after fleeing to the Mughal Empire.

Mirza Sulaiman's wife was Khurram Begum, of the Kipchak tribe. She was clever, and had her husband so much in her power that he did nothing without her advice. Her enemy was Muhtarim Khanum, the widow of Prince Kamran Mirza. Mirza Sulaiman wanted to marry her; but Khurram Begum got her married, against her will, to Mirza Ibrahim, by whom she had a son, Mirza Shahrukh. When Mirza Ibrahim fell in the war with Balkh, Khurram Begum wanted to send the Khanum to her father, Shah Muhammad of Kashgar; but she refused to go. As soon as Shahrukh had grown up, his mother and some Badakhshi nobles excited him to rebel against his grandfather Mirza Sulaiman. This he did, alternately rebelling and again making peace. Khurram Begum then died. Shahrukh took away those parts of Badakhshan which his father had held, and found so many adherents, that Mirza Sulaiman, pretending to go on a pilgrimage to Makkah, left Badakhshan for Kabul, and crossing the Indus went to India in 1575 CE. Khan Jahan, governor of the Punjab, received orders from Emperor Akbar to invade Badakhshan, but was suddenly ordered to go to Bengal instead, as Mun'im Khan had died and Mirza Sulaiman did not care for the governorship of Bengal, which Akbar had offered him.

Mirza Sulaiman then went to Ismail II of Safavid Iran. When the death of that monarch deprived him of the assistance which he had just received, he went to Muzaffar Husain Mirza at Kandahar, and then to Mirza Muhammad Hakim at Kabul. Not succeeding in raising disturbances in Kabul, he made for the frontier of Badakhshan, and luckily finding some adherents, he managed to get from his grandson the territory between Taiqan and the Hindu Kush. Soon after, Muhtarim Khanum died. Being again pressed by Shahrukh, Mirza Sulaiman applied for help to Abdullah Khan II, king of Turan, who had long wished to annex Badakhshan. He invaded and took the country in 1584; Shahrukh fled to the Mughal Empire, and Mirza Sulaiman to Kabul. As he could not recover Badakhshan for himself, and was rendered destitute by the death of Mirza Muhammad Hakim, he followed the example of his grandson, and repaired to the court of Akbar who made him a commander of six thousand. He lived out his life at Akbar's court in Lahore where he died in 1589 CE.

Like neighboring Balkh Subah, Badakhshan was shortly conquered in 1641 by Mughal padshah (emperor) Shah Jahan, who turned it also into a short-lived subah (imperial top-level province), only to be lost again in 1647.

=== Later emirates and khanates ===
Some years after Badakhshan was conquered by the Uzbeks from Mughals, an uprising against their rule led to the establishment of the Emirate of Badakhshan under Yarid dynasty in 1657. The first Mir of Badakhshan was Mir Yar Beg Sahibzada. The old capital of Badakhshan was located in Kishim District. In the 18th century the capital of Badakhshan was the town of Khamchan, located three miles west of Fayzabad and situated on both sides of the Kokcha River. After the invasion of Badakhshan by Ahmad Shah Durrani in the later half of the 18th century, the capital was relocated to Fayzabad, then known as Jauzun. In the 19th century the capital was moved to Jurm, until it finally was relocated back to Fayzabad.

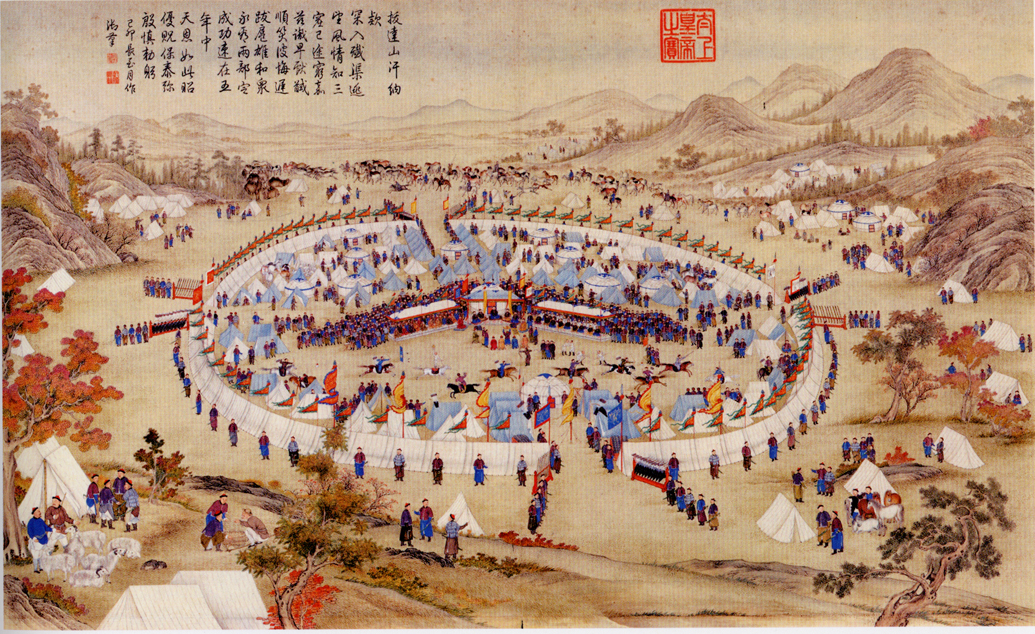
In 1756 Badakhshan emir made the Chinese Qing dynasty recognize the Elder of Badakhshan (the "gray bearded") at Alti as sovereign in Kashgar and levied taxes on the city and parts of the province of Xinjiang.

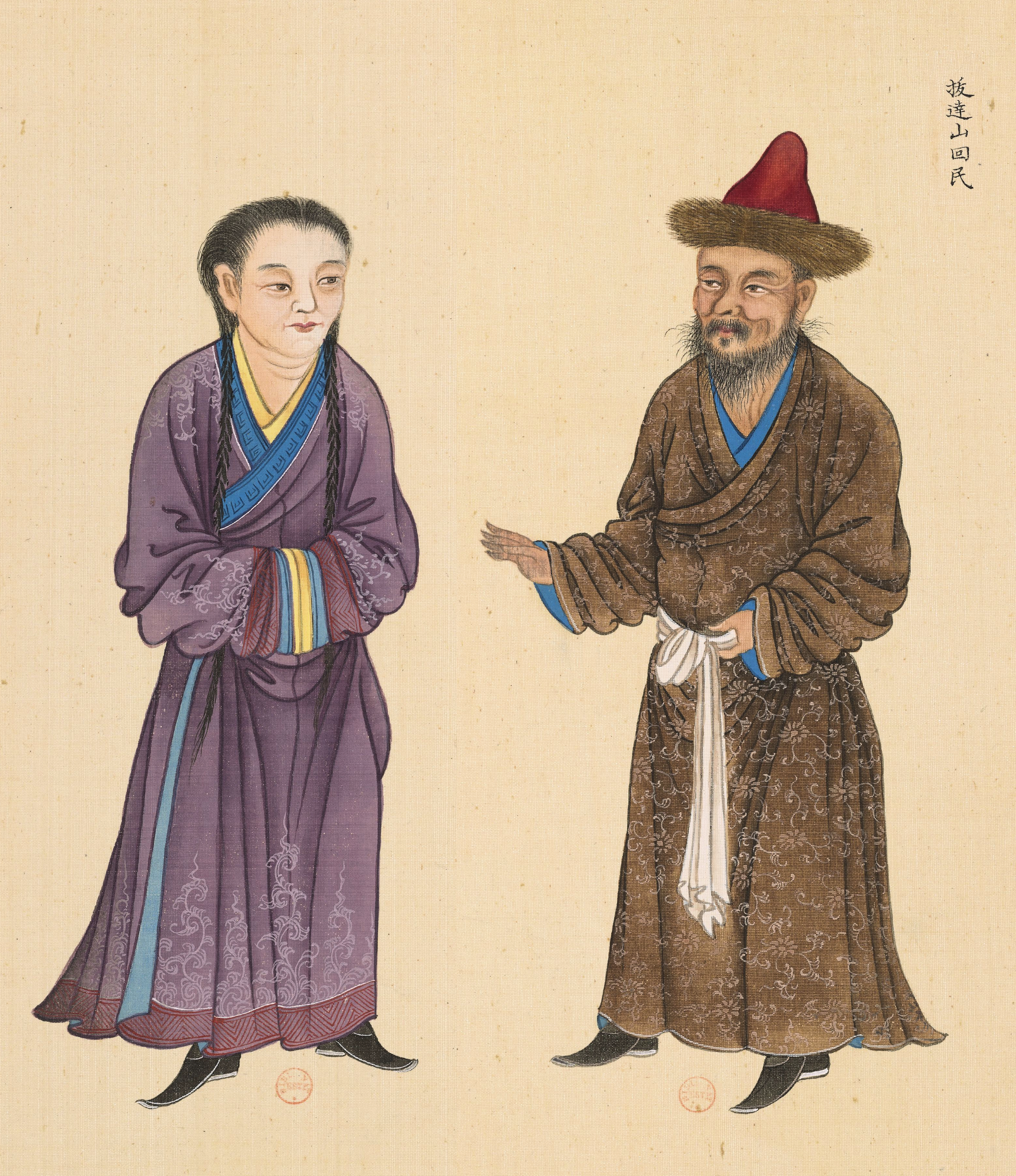
Muslim commoners from Badakhshan. Huang Qing Zhigong Tu, 1769.

In 1750, Mir Sultan Shah, Mir of Badakhshan, rebelled against Khizri Beg, governor of Balkh. After consulting Ahmad Shah Durrani, Khizri Beg marched against Sultan Shah and the Wazir Shah Wali aided the invading column. The pickets of Badakhshan, chief of Taloqan, fled from their postal approach of enemy. Men of Badakhshan, disgusted with their chief because of his partiality to Kalmak and Kashghar foreigners, waited on Wazir Shah Wali and hailed him as deliverer. Sultan Shah, finding resistance hopeless, fled to Ailu Basit in the hills between Chiab and Pasakoh. The Wazir Shah Wali returned with force to Kabul leaving his country in charge of an Afghan governor. Sultan Shah returned, slew the governor and regained his country. He was attacked by another rival, Turrah Baz Khan, who, supported by Khizri Beg, advanced on Faizabad and besieged it. Sultan Shah was taken prisoner. The Kunduz chief, unwilling to lose an opportunity, seized Turrah Baz Khan and sent both captives to Kunduz and annexed Badakhshan.

In 1751 Sultan Shah was restored to liberty and his country. He punished marauders of the Saki tribe who had ransacked Chiab, Takhta Band, Khalpan in Badakhshan. He slew a large portion and 700 horses were taken. Place was marked by 200 heads of raiders on Kotal of Khoja Jarghatu and Saki gave no more trouble during Sultan Shah's lifetime. This Chief built a fortress at Mashad in which he settled 600 families. He had a rest house built for travelers at Daryun. In 1756 he made the Chinese recognize Akskal of Badakhshan at Alti in Xinjiang and levied taxes from Badakhshan families in city.

In 1759 another enemy appeared led by Kabad Khan. The Kataghans attacked Fayzabad, and took and put to death Sultan Shah and Turrah Baz Khan. Mir Muhammad Shah, son of Sultan Shah, escaped and retired to Tang i Nau from whence later he attacked Faizabad, put to death his youngest brother Nasarullah Khan Chief of that place under the government of Kabul, and took the Kingdom. His father's old enemy Kabad Khan, whom the patronage of Timur Shah Durrani (successor of Ahmad Shah Durrani) had elevated to the Chiefship of Kunduz, sent a force against Muhammad Shah under Kubadcha. They wintered at Sang i Mohr and were joined by Kabad Khan in person. Muhammad Shah submitted and was detained at Kunduz for two years. After that fortune turned against Kabad Khan. Throwing off his allegiance to Kabul when Timur Shah Durrani was marching against Sindh and Kashmir, Mizrab Bi, grandson of Muhammad Bi (the old chief of Kunduz) united with the chief of Kubab to attack Kabad Khan, seized him and gave him to Mir Muhammad Shah, who put him to death to avenge his father Mir Muhammad Shah. He returned to Badakhshan to find throne occupied by Bahadur Shah, son of a former Chief who had taken Faizabad during the captivity of Mir Muhammad Shah in Kunduz. Bahadur Shah was deposed and the rightful owner recovered the throne. Fortune frowned again on Mir Muhammad Shah. Bahadur Shah obtained aid of the Mir of Shighnan and took Fayzabad. Mir Muhammad Shah fled to Chiab. In two years, Bahadur Shah was put to death by an agent of the Shighnan Chief named Bahadur, who took the throne. Muhammad Shah repeatedly attempted to expel him. But aid was refused him by the Shighnan Chief and Kurghan Tappa. He regained the throne on the assassination of Bahadur by his servant. The late usurper's ministers were all killed.

Immediately Mir Muhammad Shah was engaged in hostilities with Jalal ud din Chief of Shighnan, who rebelled and held out in the fort till Mir Muhammad Shah captured it and he submitted. By clemency of the victor he was reinstated as chief of Fayzabad. In same year Shah Abul Faiz, son of Shah Shuja of Ragh, rebelled against Mir Muhammad Shah and was vanquished. The territory of Mir Muhammad Shah was divided as follows: Iskashim was given to Mir Khan; Rushan to Shah Wali and Warduj to Mahmud Khan, brother of Mir Ahmad Beg Kataghan. Mir Muhammad Shah also built a new fort named Sarai Bahadur.

Khodai Nazar Beg Kataghan, brother of Darab Bi, expelled his five nephews from Kunduz and Aliwardi Beg, chief of Kurghan Tappa on pretence of avenging their wrongs attacked Khodai Nazar Beg and drove him from Kunduz. His avarice caused him to occupy the country himself. Darab Bi's sons wandered to Badakhshan and Balkh Aliwardi Beg did not long enjoy fruits of treachery. In 1795, Emir Haidar of Emirate of Bukhara invaded Balkh and Kunduz annexed them and took Aliwardi Beg to Bukhara as prisoner.

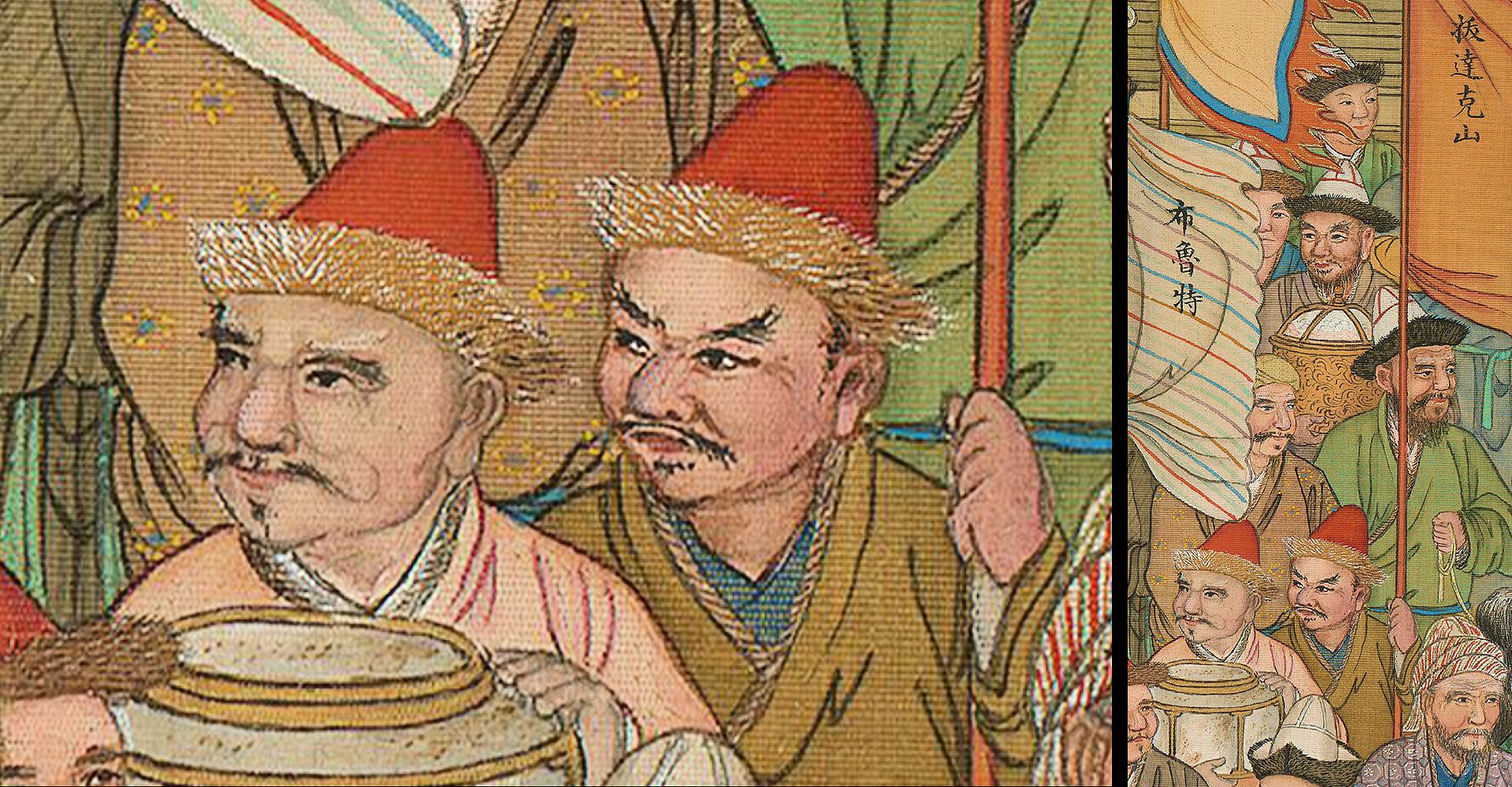
Badakhshan delegates (拔達克山) in Peking in 1761. 万国来朝图

In 1812, Mir Sultan Shah II succeeded as mir of Badakhshan after his father Mir Muhammad Shah's death in 1810. He remained friendly with his neighbors and the country prospered. He recovered arrears of taxes from Chinese settlers and levied payment in advance. In 1814 he invaded Chitral and took thousands of prisoners, whom he sold in Balkh, Bukhara, Farghana and Khiva. He died in 1815, leaving five sons of whom Mir Yar Beg succeeded him as ruler.

Meanwhile, Kunduz was still under Emirate of Bukhara and the wandering sons of Darab Bi Kataghan decided to attack and retake the city, which they did in 1810. The Amir of Kunduz was now Mir Muhammad Murad Beg, one of the brothers. Mir Yar Beg was now worried about the rising popularity and power of Mir Muhammad Murad Beg in the region. Eventually, in 1820, the two would face off at Darah Aim in which Mir Muhammad Murad Beg would be the victor. In 1822 four brothers under the service of Mir Muhammad Murad Beg rebelled, led by Kokan Beg. Mir Muhammad Murad Beg and Kokan Beg often fought with each other over territory inconclusively while battling against rebels in their own respective territories for years. Kokan Beg would be assassinated by his ally in Kashkar (lower Chitral) by being pushed down a precipice. Mir Muhammad Murad Beg, taking advantage of this situation, took Badakhshan by occupying Fayzabad. But despite invading Badakhshan Mir Muhammad Murad Beg had little to no control over it. In fact Badakhshan was now contested by again by Mir Yar Beg, Sikandar Shah, Shahzada Mahmud, Abdul Ghazi Khan and Shah Suliman Beg, who were in exile at Tashqurghan (Kholm) under the protection of Mir Wali. Fayzabad had a small population under spiritual preceptor Mian Fazal Azim, Sahibzada of Sirhind. Jirm, Zardeo, Mashad, Daraaim and Fayzabad were successively occupied by these chiefs. Fayzabad fell to Mir Yar Beg, who rebuilt his fort and lived in the city. The old dynasty thus was restored.

=== Between Afghanistan, Britain and Russia ===
In 1839 the occupation of Afghanistan by the British drove Amir Dost Muhammad Khan into exile. He visited Khulam and Kunduz and was well received. They could not aid him against British and Dost Muhammad proceeded to the Emirate of Bukhara, then governed by Amir Nasrullah Khan who was addicted to the society of boys. Sher Ali Khan, the son of Dost Muhammad Khan was then a beardless youth and Nasrullah Khan coveted him. The Afghan pride of Sher Ali was however inflamed and he informed his father and brothers of the insulting desire of Nasrullah Khan. Dost Muhammad Khan then decided to leave the Emirate of Bukhara but found himself a prisoner, and with difficulty escaped with his sons to Balkh.

Also in 1839, Mir Muhammad Murad Beg again attacked Rustak in Badakhshan and appointed an officer of his own in Farkhar. Two months later he also attacked Mashad. But he failed to obtain a footing in Badakhshan, which remained in possession of its hereditary Mirs.

In 1844, Mir Yar Beg was poisoned by Mir Ahmad Shah at the instigation of Sulaiman Beg and died on his return to Fayzabad. The instigator of the murder had been fascinated by the extraordinary beauty of the wife of Mir Yar Beg, and was impelled by his passion for the lady to accomplish the death of her husband. On his death Sulaiman Beg took possession of Fayzabad and married his widow. Mir Ahmad Shah discovered that the murder of Yar Beg was instigated by Sulaiman Beg with the object of possessing his wife, and advancing against him, expelled him from Faizabad, of which he took possession himself. He then wrote to Mir Atalik Beg, chief of Kunduz, requesting his aid against Yusuf Ali Khan and Mir Shah to drive them out of Rustak. The letter did not reach its destination but fell by some means into hands of Mir Shah who forwarded it to Sulaiman Shah and invited him to a consultation at Rustak. The chiefs then united and marched against Mir Ahmad Shah, who was expelled to Kunduz. A new distribution was made of country. Mir Shah occupied Fayzabad as supreme ruler of Badakhshan. Shah Sulaiman Beg received Dara Aim; Nasrullah Khan got Kashmir and Mashad. Rustak and Chiab were allotted to Yusuf Ali Khan. Jirm to Sikandar Shah, and Zardeo Sarghalan was given to Shahzada Mahmud.

From 1840 to 1859, Afghanistan and the Emirate of Bukhara struggled for Balkh and Badakhshan, with Afghanistan prevailing. Mir Shah, chief of Badakhshan and his feudatory of Rustak went to wait on Mohammad Azam Khan (son of Dost Muhammad Khan) with presents and an offer of submission. Mir Shah betrothed his niece (daughter of his brother Nizam-ud-din Khan) to Muhammad Azam Khan. A treaty was made with the Muhammad Azam Khan as follows:

Ruler of Badakhshan, children and successors, agree to remain firm in allegiance to Amir of Kabul and officers in Balkh not to join foreign enemy against Amir of Kabul. Ruler of Badakhshan to furnish suitable contingent in difficulty and to aid Amir of Kabul and to give annual presents.

But Mir Shah had trouble governing his region. Family quarrels over territory kept him busy till his death in 1862. He was succeeded by his son Mir Jahandar Shah. He too would get involved in various intrigues in the region as well as issues of succession in his neighborhood, taking one side or the other. In 1865, Mir Jahandar Shah sent his ambassador Syed Muhammad to the British Commissioner in Peshawar to establish friendly relations. However, peace did not last long, as Dost Muhammad Khan died and his sons began to fight for the throne. Eventually Mir Jahandar Shah was forced to take the side of Sher Ali Khan and Muhammad Azam Khan (who was now married to Mir Jahandar Shah's daughter as well). But Mohammad Afzal Khan secured Kabul, forcing Sher Ali Khan to retreat to Herat. Mir Jahandar Shah handed over his allies to Mohammad Afzal Khan. This angered Sher Ali Khan and his deputy in Akhcha, Faiz Muhammad Khan, who went into battle at Gulaugan against Mir Jahandar Shah and defeated him. After the flight of Mir Jahandar Shah the country was divided. Mir Jahandar Shah sought refuge in Kabul, where he was restored a year afterwards to his ancestral throne by the influence of Abdur Rahman Khan, son of the Mohammad Afzal Khan, and by his popularity. His rival Mahmud Shah left without a struggle in October 1868. Mir Jahandar Shah of Badakhshan never asked forgiveness for the hostilities to Amir Sher Ali Khan with Azam Khan and failed to wait on Governor of Balkh at Takhtapul.

Sher Ali in October 1869 invited Mizrad Shah, Muhammad Shah and Ibrahim, deposed chiefs of Badakhshan and restored them. Mir Jahandar Shah fled to Kulab. In December 1869, Mir Jahandar Shah left the camp of Emir of Bukhara in Kulab and attacked Badakhshan and burned fort Zang Kila.

After being annexed by Afghanistan, Badakhshan was joined with Qataghan to create the Badakhshan-Qataghan district in Afghan Turkestan Province.

Eventually the Great Game began, with the Russians instigating the Emirate of Bukhara to claim certain territories of Afghanistan and the British recognizing Afghanistan's claim to the disputed territories. Badakhshan's boundaries were decided by the Anglo-Russian agreement of 1873, which expressly acknowledged "Badakhshan with its dependent district Wakhan" as "fully belonging to the Amir of Kabul", and limited it to the left or southern bank of the Amu Darya (also called the Oxus). On the west, Badakhshan was bounded by a line which crosses the Turkestan plains southwards from the junction of the Kunduz and Amu Darya rivers until it touches the eastern water-divide of the Khulm River (Tashqurghan River), and then runs southeast, crossing Kunduz, until it strikes the Hindu Kush. The southern boundary was carried along the crest of the Hindu Kush as far as the Khawak Pass, leading from Badakhshan into the Panjshir valley. Beyond this it was indefinite.

It was known that the Kafirs occupied the crest of the Hindu Kush eastwards of the Khawak, but how far they extended north of the main watershed was not ascertainable. The southern limits of Badakhshan became definite again at the Dorah Pass. The Dorah connects Zebak and Ishkashim at the elbow, or bend, of the Oxus with the Lutku valley leading to Chitral. From the Dorah eastwards the crest of the Hindu Kush again became the boundary until it effects a junction with the Muztagh and Sarikol ranges, which shut off China from Russia and India. Skirting round the head of the Tagdumbash Pamir, it finally merged into the Pamir Mountains boundary, and turned westwards, following the course of the Oxus, to the junction of that river and the Khanabad (Kunduz).

So far as the northern boundary followed the Oxus stream, under the northern slopes of the Hindu Kush, it was only separated by the length of these slopes (some 8 or 10 miles) from the southern boundary along the crest. Thus Badakhshan reached out an arm into the Pamirs eastwards, bottle-shaped and narrow at the neck (represented by the northern slopes of the Hindu Kush), and swelling out eastwards so as to include a part of the great and little Pamirs.

Before the boundary settlement of 1873 the small states of Rushan and Shugnan extended to the left bank of the Oxus, and the province of Darwaz, on the other hand, extended to the right bank. Then, however, the Darwaz extension northwards was exchanged for the Russian Pamir extension westwards, and the river throughout became the boundary between Russian and Afghan territory; the political boundaries of those provinces and those of Wakhan were no longer coincident with their geographical limits.

Chitral, Yarkand and Ferghana became shelters for refugees in 1887 and 1883 from Badakhshan who fled from the campaigns of Abdul Rahman.

The following were the chief provincial subdivisions of Badakhshan, omitting Rushan and Shugnan: on the west Rustak, Kataghan, Ghori, Narin and Anderab; on the north Darwaz, Ragh and Shiwa; on the east Charan, Ishkashim, Zebak and Wakhan; and in the center, Faizabad, Farkhar, Minjan and Kishm. There were others, but nothing certain is known about these minor subdivisions. Consequently, most western part of modern Gorno-Badakhshan became part of Emirate of Bukhara, while most of it became part of Fergana Province of Russian Turkestan. This arrangement was lasted till 1920.

In 1890 Qataghan-Badakhshan District was separated from Afghan Turkestan and Qataghan-Badakhshan Province was created. Administration of the province was assigned to the Northern Bureau in Kabul. In 1895, the Panj River was defined as part of the border between Afghan and Russian Badakhshan. This border persisted despite changes in governments.

=== 20th century ===
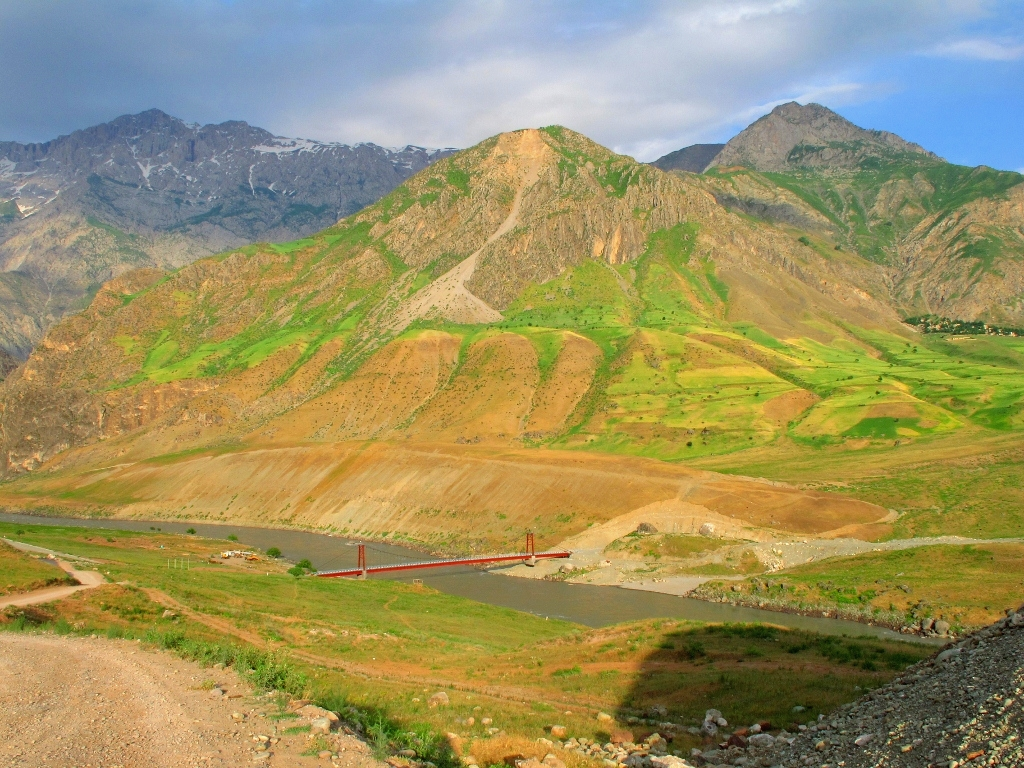
Friendship Bridge between Tajikistan, and Afghanistan, over the Panj river in Khwahan and Shuro-obod.

In 1902, the Bukharan (Western) Pamir came under the Russian military administration. In November 1918 the last Czarist Russian troops recognized Bolshevik rule, but in December 1919 the anti-Bolshevik Russian Peasant Army of Fergana took over. From April 1920, the vacuum of power was filled by an attempt to establish Bukharan rule until June 1920, when the Bukharans were expelled by local forces, Bolshevik rule was restored: the Stalinist Soviet Union seized the Bukharan part of Gorno-Badakshan.

It was merged with the Russian (since 1895) part in 1924 to become the Gorno-Badakhshan autonomous oblast (province) within the Tajik SSR in 1929. Between April 1992 – 1993, a Pamiri-Badakshoni Autonomous Republic was declared within independent post-Soviet Tajikistan, on 6 November 1994, becoming the Kohistan-Badakhshan Autonomous Province, alias Gorno-Badakhshan Autonomous Province or Mountainous Badakhshon Autonomous Veloyat.

In 1963, Badakhshan included the districts of Baghlan, Pul-i-Khumri, Dushi, Dahan-i-Ghori, Kanabad, Andarab, Kunduz, Hazrat-i-Imam, and Taloqan. In 1963 Qataghan-Badakhshan Province was abolished and its territory was divided into four separate provinces: Badakhshan, Baghlan, Kunduz and Takhar.

Tajik Badakhshan witnessed fierce fighting during the Tajikistani Civil War in the 1990s. At the height of Taliban strength during the Afghan Civil War circa 2000, Afghan Badakhashan was a stronghold for the Northern Alliance.

== Geography ==
The mountain districts comprise all of the southern districts of Badakhshan and the northern hills and valleys of Nuristan (former Kafiristan). Its terrain is analogous to that of the rest of the Hindu Kush to the west. The Hindu Kush represents the southern edge of a great central upheaval or plateau. It breaks up into long spurs southwards, among which are hidden the valleys of Nuristan, almost isolated from each other by the rugged and snow-capped altitudes which divide them. To the north the plateau gradually slopes away towards the Oxus, falling from an average altitude of 15,000 feet to 4,000 feet about Fayzabad, in central Badakhshan, and trailing off to ~100 feet at Kunduz, in Kataghan, where it merges into the flat plains bordering the Oxus river.

The Kokcha River traverses Badakhshan from southeast to northwest, and, with the Kunduz River, drains all the northern slopes of the Hindu Kush west of the Dorah Pass. Some of its sources are near Zebak, close to the great bend of the Oxus northwards, so that it cuts off all the mountainous area included within that bend from the rest of Badakhshan. Its chief affluent is the Minjan, which Sir George Robertson found to be a considerable stream where it approaches the Hindu Kush close under the Dorab. Like the Kunduz, it probably drains the northern slopes of the Hindu Kush by deep lateral valleys, more or less parallel to the crest, reaching westwards towards the Khawak Pass. From the Oxus (1,000 feet) to Faizabad (4,000 feet) and Zebak (8,500 feet) the course of the Kokcha offers a high road across Badakhshan; between Zebak and Ishkashim, at the Oxus bend, there is but an insignificant pass of 9,500 feet; and from Ishkashim by the Panj River, through the Pamirs, is the continuation of what must once have been a much-traversed trade route connecting Afghan Turkestan with Kashgar of China. It is undoubtedly one of the great continental high-roads of Asia. North of the Kokcha, within the Oxus bend, is the mountainous district of Darwaz, of which the physiography belongs rather to the Pamir type than to that of the Hindu Kush.

A meridional range extends for 100 miles northwards from the Hindu Kush (it is across this range that the route from Zebak to Ishkashim lies), which determines the great bend of the Oxus river northwards from Ishkashim, and narrows the valley of that river into the formation of a trough as far as the next bend westwards at Kala Wamar. The western slopes of this range drain to the Oxus either northwestwards, by the Kokcha and the Ragh, or else they twist their streams into the Shiwa, which runs due north across Darwaz. Here again the main routes which traverse the country follow the rivers closely. The valleys are narrow, but fertile and populous. The mountains are rugged and difficult; but there is beauty of scenery, and agricultural wealth in the valleys of Bukhara and Ferghana to be found in the recesses of Badakhshan.

== See also ==
- Mount Imeon
- Noshaq
- Nazif Shahrani
- Taxkorgan Tajik Autonomous County
