= Emirate of Badakhshan =

Independent emirate, 1657–1873

In the early modern period (1657–1873), Badakhshan was an independent emirate ruled by Yarid dynasty, whose rulers took titles of Mir, Emir and Shah. It was conquered by the Emirate of Afghanistan in 1873, and today its former territories form part of Afghanistan and Tajikistan.

== History ==
The Yarid dynasty came to power in the aftermath of Mughal campaign in Balkh and Badakhshan in 1646–1647. After the Mughal retreat, the Uzbek Qataghan tribe captured Badakhshan, but their rule was hated in the region. After a mass rebellion in 1657, Yari Beg Khan was selected Mir of Badakhshan. Originally a Naqshbandi Sufi figure from Bukhara, Yari Beg obtained recognition from Subhan Quli Khan, the Khan of Bukhara, thereby formalising his independence. One of his achievements was the capture of the reputed Cloak of Muhammad from a caravan of rival Naqshbandi shaykhs which was travelling to India. He built a shrine to host it at what would later be known as Fayzabad (lit. Blessed Abode) in reference to the Cloak, and would become capital of Badakhshan.

Yari Beg divided Badakhshan among his eight sons at the time of his death in 1707 who entered a civil war, from which Diya al-Din ultimately emerged victorious in 1718. Mirza Nubat, the Mir of Badakhshan, was forced to become a tributary to Nader Shah from 1740 to 1747, but declared independence after his death.

He was followed by Mir Sultan Shah, who invaded the kingdom of Chitral in 1751 and enslaved thousands of Chitralis. He was forced to withdraw from Chitral in 1763 because of the threat of Chinese invasion as Chitral had become tributary to Qing dynasty.

In 1768, Badakhshan was invaded by Ahmad Shah Durrani who carried off the Cloak of Muhammad, followed by a destructive invasion of Badakhshan by Qubad Khan, the rival Khan of Kunduz, who executed Mir Sultan Shah in 1775.

As Mir of Badakhshan's authority declined, the Pamiri states of Wakhan, Shughnan and Darvaz asserted autonomy. In early 19th-century, Murad Beg, the Khan of Kunduz, gathered Uzbek tribes and invaded Badakhshan, conquering it in 1829. While his invasion was devastating, he managed to reassert the authority over Pamiri states. Murad Beg himself had to face invasion by Dost Muhammad Khan in 1836 and thus lost control of Badakhshan, which again came under control of Yarid dynasty under Mir Yari Beg.

Mir Yari Beg's successor, Shah Zaman al-Din ruled from 1844 to 1864 and was succeeded by his son Jahandar Shah. In the meantime, Dost Muhammad Khan captured Balkh in 1849 followed by Kunduz in 1859, and Jahandar Shah was forced to become his tributary. Finally, Badakhshan was annexed by Afghans in 1873 and Mir of Badakhshan was deposed, although eastern Pamir including Shughnan, Rushan and Darvaz came under control of Emirate of Bukhara, later becoming a part of Russian Empire in 1905.

== Administration ==
The fertile parts of Badakhshan, including the central region, Kishim, Rustaq, Ragh, and Jurm were directly ruled by the Mir of Badakhshan while the neighbouring mountainous polities of Ishkashim, Zebak, Wakhan, and Shughnan were ruled by local dynasties, but under his authority. The population mainly consisted of Tajiks and Pamiris.

== Economy ==
The economy of the kingdom was chiefly based on agriculture and its rich mines of lapis lazuli, jasper, and ruby, as well as the slave trade.

== See also ==
List of mirs of Badakhshan
