= Bozorg =

Bozorg (بزرگ) meaning big and also elder in Persian, may refer to:

== Places ==
- Bozorg, Hormozgan (بزرگ، هرمزگان), a village in Hormozgan Province, Iran
- Agha Bozorg Mosque (مسجد آقا بزرگ), an historical mosque in Kashan, Iran
- Shahr-e Bozorg (شهر بزرگ), a village in Badakhshan Province in north-eastern Afghanistan

== People ==
- Agha Bozorg Tehrani (آقا بزرگ تهرانی; 1876–1970), Shia marja from Hawza Elmiye Najaf
- Bozorg Alavi (بزرگ علوی, 1904–1997), influential Iranian writer, novelist, and political intellectual
- Leila Bozorg, American urban planner and government official

== See also ==
- Bozorgmehr, legendary Sassanian prime-minister of Persia
- Jayezeye Bozorg (جایزه بزرگ), a 2005 Iranian TV series directed by Mehran Modiri
- Buzurg (disambiguation)
