= Buzurg =

Buzurg may refer to:

- Bozorgmehr, legendary Sassanian prime-minister of Persia
- Bisanda Buzurg, a town and a nagar panchayat in Banda district in the state of Uttar Pradesh, India
- Hasan Buzurg, the first of several de facto independent Jalayirid rulers of Iraq and central Iran
- Kavir Buzurg, (meaning great salt marsh), lies in the centre of the Dasht-e Kavir, which is a desert located in the middle of the Iranian plateau
- Mahtinya Buzurg, a village in Domariaganj, Uttar Pradesh, India
- Shahri Buzurg District, one of the 29 districts of Badakhshan Province in eastern Afghanistan

== See also ==
- Bozorg (disambiguation)
