= Raghistan District =

Raghistan ولسوالی راغستان
- District
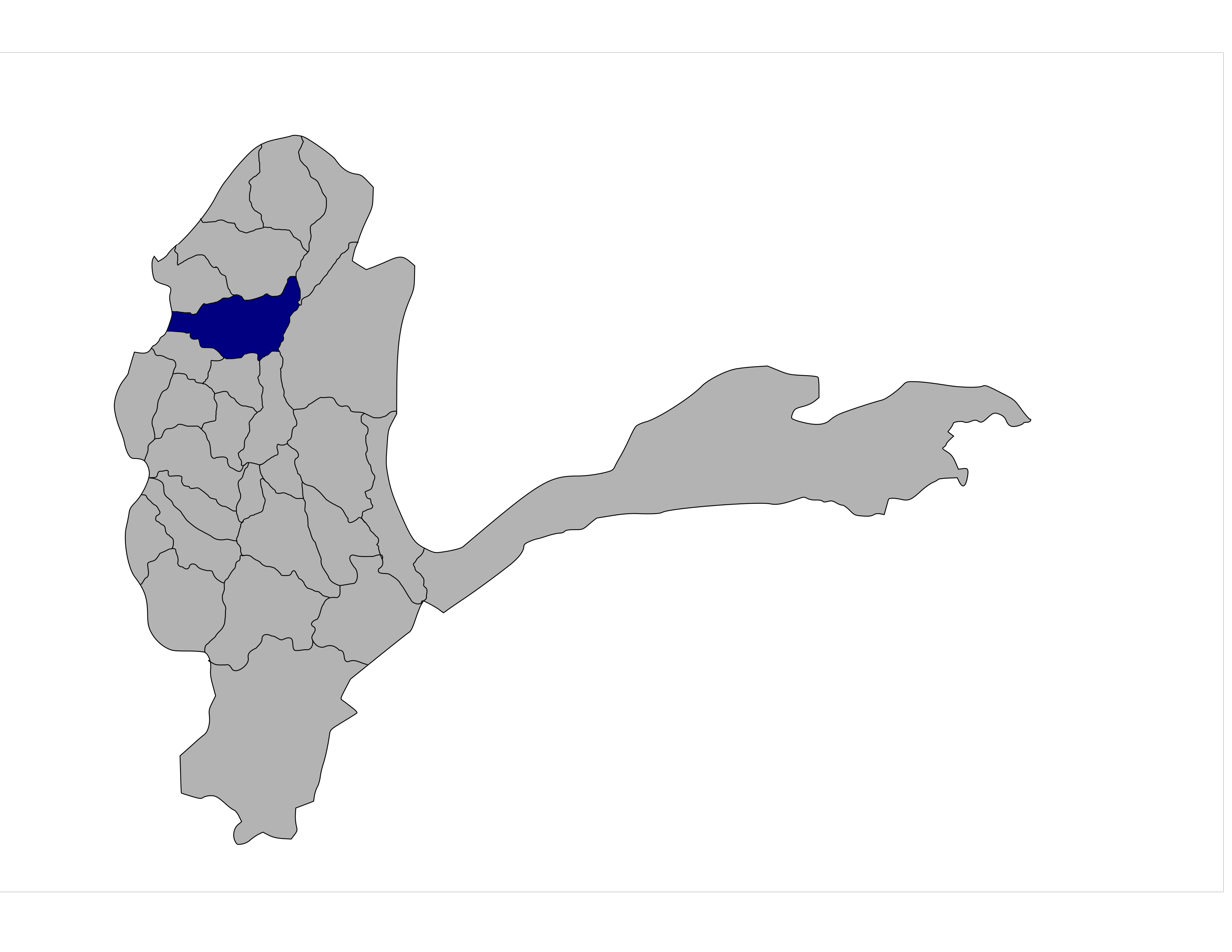
- Coordinates: 37°39′54″N 70°39′28″E
- Country: Afghanistan
- Province: Badakhshan
- Region: Ragh
- Capital: Ziraki

Population (2012)
  - Total: 37,800
- Time zone: +4,30
- Postal code: 3461

Raghistan (Dari: ولسوالی راغستان, romanized: Wuluswali Rāğestān) is one of the 28 districts of Badakhshan Province in eastern Afghanistan. Located in the northwestern portion of the province, Ragh is home to approximately 44,004 residents, and its capital is Ziraki.

One of the special characteristics of Raghistan is that all its residents are pure Persian–Dari speakers. Raghistan borders on Tajikistan and on the Yaftal Bala, Yaftali Sufla, Khwahan, Kuf Ab, Maimay, Shighnan, Arghanj Khwa, and Shahri Buzurg districts of Badakhshan.

Prominent rivers of Raghistan are the Yawan, Rawinj, Siab Dasht, Du Dara, and Rahe Dara rivers. There are only a few schools in Ragh; most of the people are busy in agriculture and animal husbandry activities.
