= Khaje Taj od-Din Mausoleum =

Imamzadeh in Kashan, Iranian national heritage site

Khawjeh Tajeddin Mausoleum
- بقعه خواجه تاج الدین
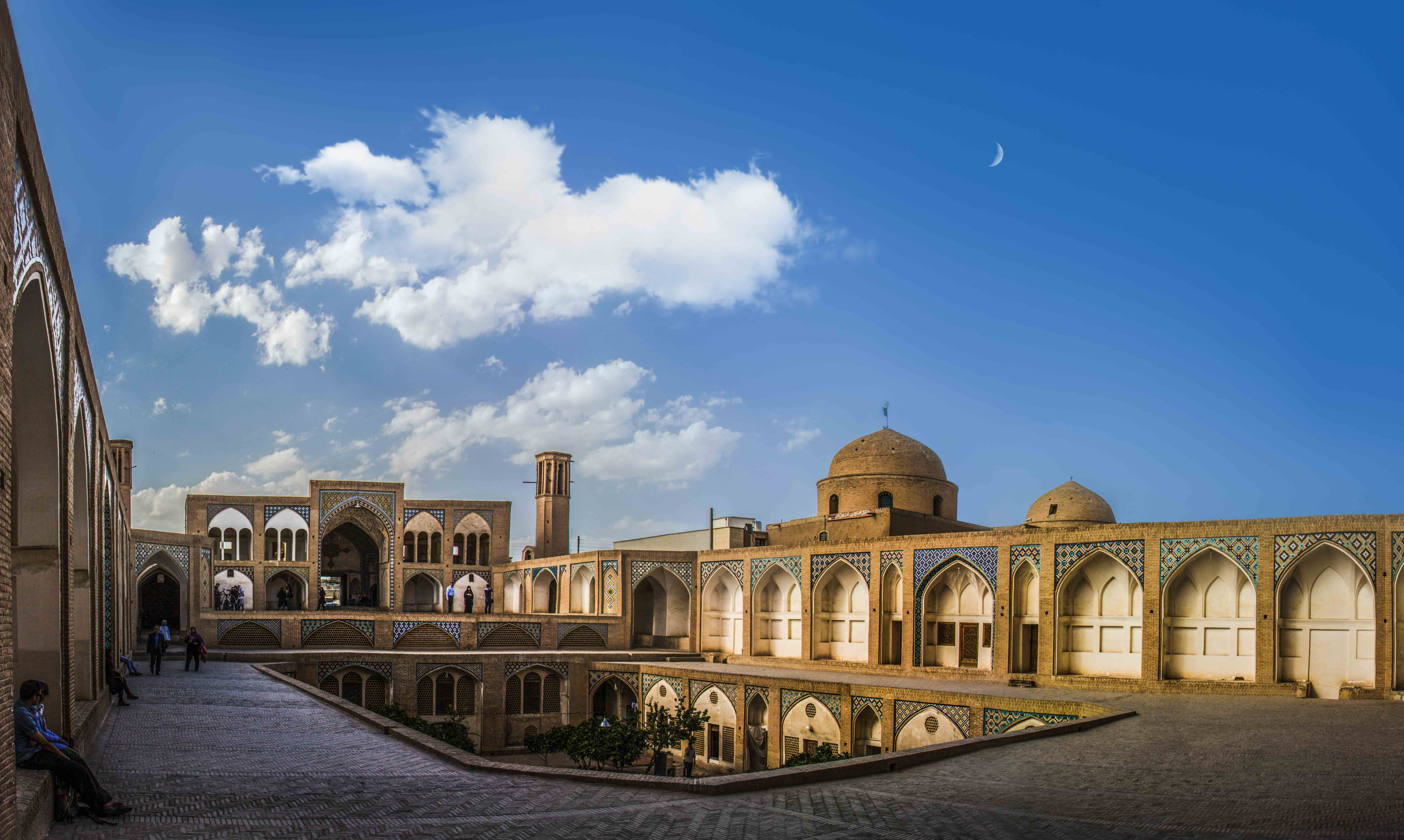
- The mausoleum, viewed from the sahn of the Agha Bozorg Mosque

- Location of the complex in Iran

Religion
- Affiliation: Sunni Islam
- Ecclesiastical or organisational status: Mausoleum; Shrine; Imamzadeh
- Status: Active (mausoleum and shrine); Inactive (mosque, madrasah and khanqah)

Location
- Location: Kashan, Fazel-e Naraghi, Isfahan province
- Country: Iran
- Interactive map of Khawjeh Tajeddin Mausoleum
- Coordinates: 33°58′43″N 51°26′44″E

Architecture
- Type: Iranian architecture
- Style: Timurid; Seljuk
- Founder: Khwaja Zaynuddin
- Completed: 15th century CE

Specifications
- Dome: Two
- Shrines: Three: Khwaja Tajuddin; Shahzadeh Ishaq; Shahzadeh Abu Talib
- Materials: Bricks

Iran National Heritage List
- Official name: Khawjeh Tajeddin Mausoleum
- Type: Mausoleum
- Designated: 1956
- Reference no.: 400
- Conservation organization: Cultural Heritage, Handicrafts and Tourism Organization of Iran

The Khaje Taj od-Din Mausoleum, also known as the Khwaja Tajuddin Mausoleum, (Persian: بقعه خواجه تاجالدین), (Note: Other names include: the Khajeh Taj al-Din Mausoleum, the Shahzadeh Abi Talib Mausoleum (Kashan), and the Shahzadeh Ishaq Mausoleum (Kashan).) is a historic mausoleum and Islamic shrine complex, located next to the Agha Bozorg Mosque in Fazel-e Naraghi district of Kashan, Isfahan province, Iran. It was built in the 15th century over a Seljuk-era structure by the Timurid dignitary, Khwaja Zaynuddin, around the grave of his brother.

The mausoleum was added to the Iran National Heritage List on 1 February 1956 and is administered by the Cultural Heritage, Handicrafts and Tourism Organization of Iran.

== History ==
The site of the complex was originally a Seljuk-era building. Later on in the 15th century, the Timurid dignitary, Khwaja Zaynuddin, built a religious complex centred around the grave of his brother, Khwaja Tajuddin, who was the minister of the Qara Qoyunlu emir, Jahan Shah. He built a khanqah, mosque and madrasa there as well. However, both the mosque and madrasa no longer exist, except for the shrine. The building was abandoned from the Safavid era until 1959 when it received renovations from the daughter of the Chief-of-Staff of the Iranian Armed Forces, Hassan Firouzabadi.

== Burials ==
Aside from Khwaja Tajuddin, two other saints—Shahzadeh Ishaq and Shahzadeh Abu Talib—are buried there. They were the sons of Hamzah ibn Musa, who is interred at the Imamzadeh Hamzah in Tabriz. One of the mystics from the Nimatullahi order, Hajj Mullah Mohammad Hasan Qutb al-Natanzi, is also buried in the remains of the khanqah. Additionally, Hassan Firouzabadi’s daughter, who renovated the mausoleum in 1959, is also buried there.

== Gallery ==
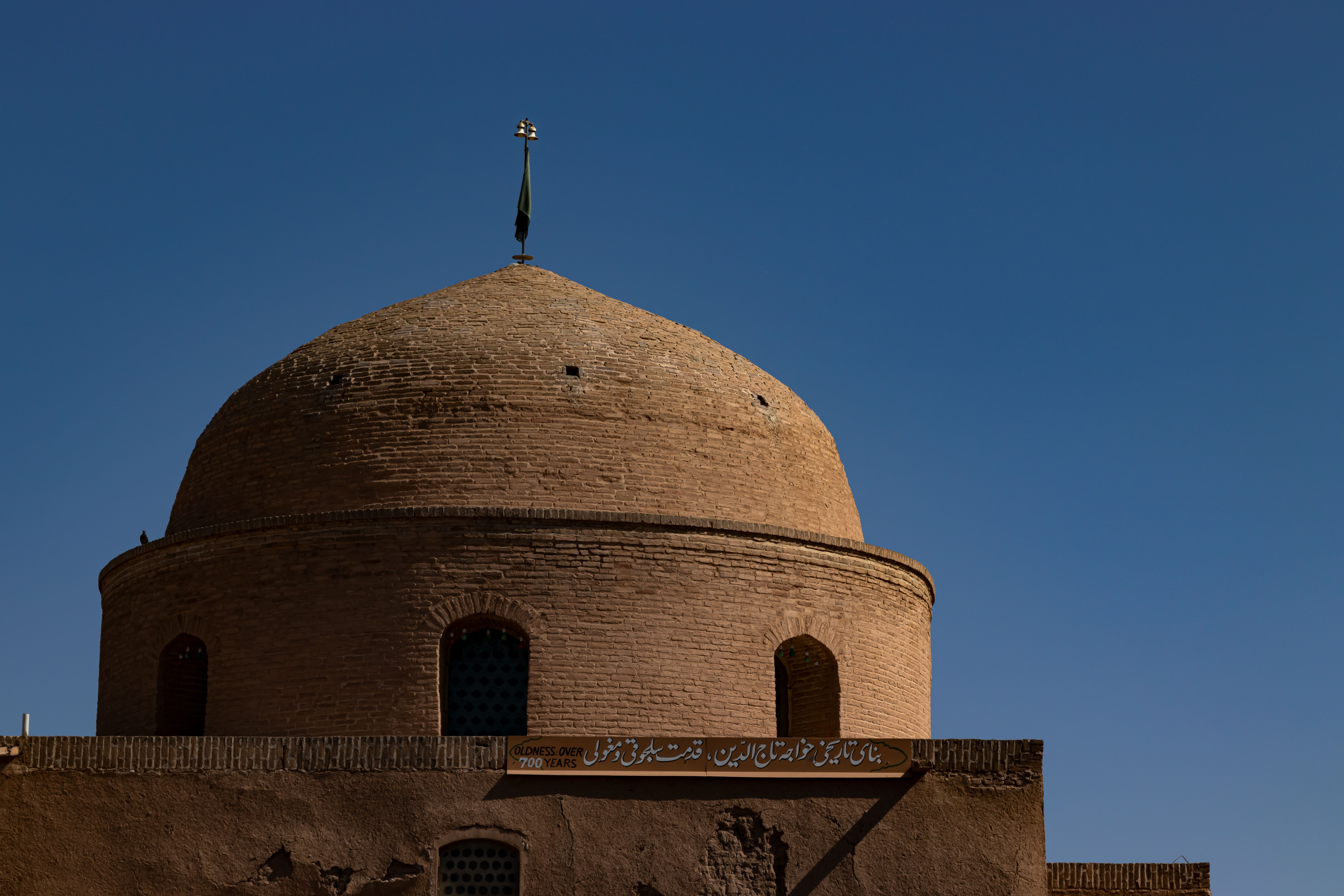
The exterior of the main dome

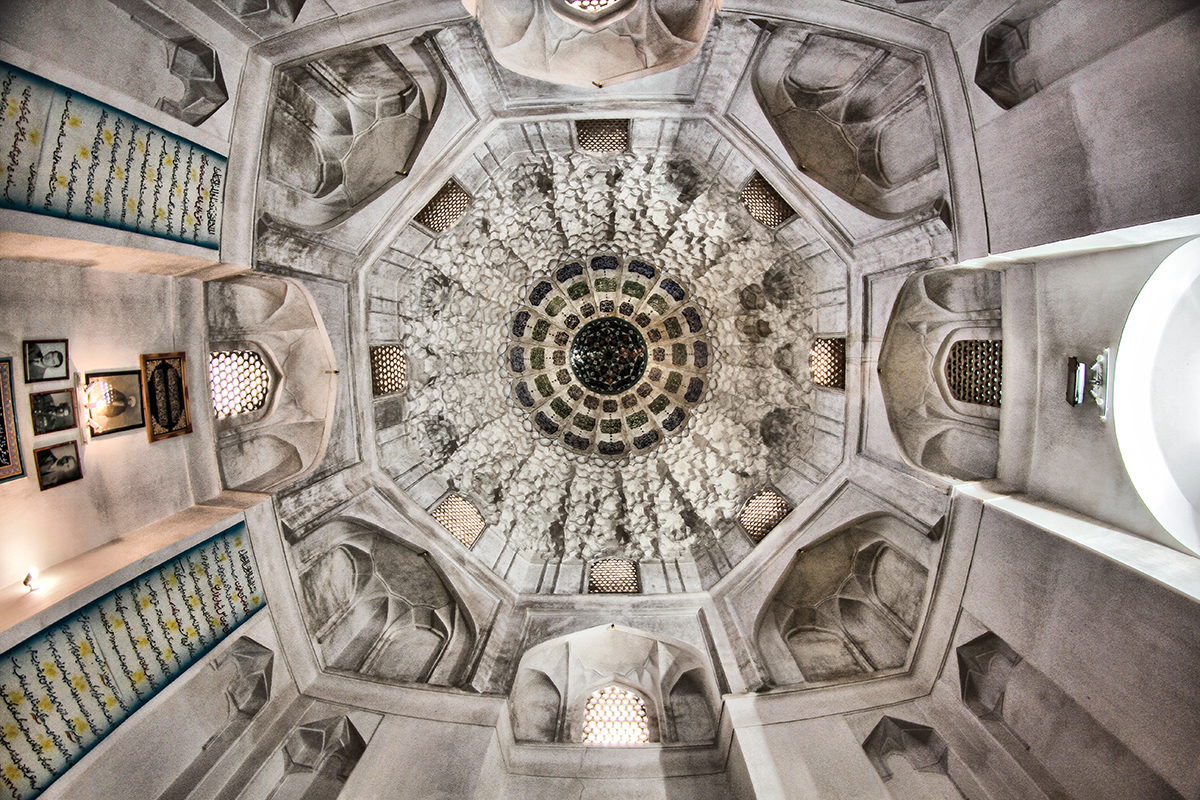
The interior of the main dome

== See also ==
- List of historical structures in Isfahan Province
- List of mausoleums in Iran
- List of imamzadehs in Iran
