= Ziraki, Badakhshan =

Ziraki زیرکی
- Location in Afghanistan
- Coordinates: 37°35′30″N 70°33′27″E
- Country: Afghanistan
- Province: Badakhshan Province
- District: Raghistan
- Elevation: 8,200 ft (2,500 m)
- Time zone: + 4.30

Ziraki (Dari: زیرکی) is a village and the capital of Raghistan District in Badakhshan Province in northeastern Afghanistan.
