= Shahr-e Bozorg =

Shahr-e Bozorg شهر بزرگ
- Location in Afghanistan
- Coordinates: 37°18′40″N 70°10′2″E
- Country: Afghanistan
- Province: Badakhshan
- District: Shahri Buzurg
- Elevation: 5,692 ft (1,735 m)
- Time zone: + 4.30

Shahr-e Bozorg (Dari: شهر بزرگ, romanized: Šahre Bozorg) is a village and the district capital of Shahri Buzurg District, in Badakhshan Province in north-eastern Afghanistan.

During May 1998 this village was at the epicentre of a large earthquake. Support was provided by helicopter and donkey convoy due to the inaccessibility of the area. Medical and emergency food support was provided by a consortium of the Northern Alliance Government and International NGOs assisted by UNOCHA from Faizabad, at that time the capital of the Northern Alliance held area of Afghanistan.

== Climate ==
Shahr-e Bozorg has a humid continental climate (Köppen Dsb).

Climate data for Shahr-i-Buzurg
Month	Jan	Feb	Mar	Apr	May	Jun	Jul	Aug	Sep	Oct	Nov	Dec	Year
Mean daily maximum °C (°F)	−0.4 (31.3)	1.6 (34.9)	9.1 (48.4)	15.5 (59.9)	19.9 (67.8)	24.1 (75.4)	27.1 (80.8)	26.5 (79.7)	22.8 (73.0)	16.7 (62.1)	9.1 (48.4)	2.3 (36.1)	14.5 (58.2)
Daily mean °C (°F)	−5.9 (21.4)	−3.5 (25.7)	3.1 (37.6)	8.9 (48.0)	13.6 (56.5)	17.6 (63.7)	20.6 (69.1)	20.1 (68.2)	16.2 (61.2)	10.3 (50.5)	2.9 (37.2)	−3.8 (25.2)	8.3 (47.0)
Mean daily minimum °C (°F)	−11.3 (11.7)	−8.6 (16.5)	−3.0 (26.6)	2.3 (36.1)	7.3 (45.1)	11.0 (51.8)	14.1 (57.4)	13.6 (56.5)	9.6 (49.3)	3.9 (39.0)	−3.4 (25.9)	−9.8 (14.4)	2.1 (35.9)
Average precipitation mm (inches)	67 (2.6)	80 (3.1)	112 (4.4)	144 (5.7)	143 (5.6)	67 (2.6)	16 (0.6)	7 (0.3)	7 (0.3)	35 (1.4)	55 (2.2)	55 (2.2)	788 (31.0)
Average relative humidity (%)	61	64	61	59	57	47	37	35	38	48	56	59	52
Source: Climate-Data.org

== See also ==
- Badakhshan Province
