= Mir Khan =

Mir Khan ميرخان
- Village
- Location within Iran
- Coordinates: 32°23′55″N 59°46′42″E
- Country: Iran
- Province: South Khorasan
- County: Sarbisheh
- Bakhsh: Central
- Rural District: Momenabad

Population (2006)
  - Total: 49
- Time zone: UTC+3:30 (IRST)
  - Summer (DST): UTC+4:30 (IRDT)

Mir Khan (Persian: ميرخان, also Romanized as Mīr Khān, Mīghān, and Mīr Khūn) is a village in Momenabad Rural District, in the Central District of Sarbisheh County, South Khorasan Province, Iran. At the 2006 census, its population was 49, in 11 families.
