= Mahtinya Buzurg =

Village in Uttar Pradesh, India

Mahtinya Buzurg is a village in Domariaganj, Uttar Pradesh, India.
