= Mogh Rahmat =

Mogh Rahmat مغ رحمت
- Village
- Location within Iran
- Coordinates: 26°07′43″N 57°13′42″E
- Country: Iran
- Province: Hormozgan
- County: Jask
- Bakhsh: Central
- Rural District: Kangan

Population (2006)
  - Total: 130
- Time zone: UTC+3:30 (IRST)
  - Summer (DST): UTC+4:30 (IRDT)

Mogh Rahmat (Persian: مغ رحمت, also Romanized as Mogh Raḥmat; also known as Berīz, Berīzak, Bīrīzag, Bīrīzg, Bīrīzg-e Bālā, and Bozorg) is a village in Kangan Rural District, in the Central District of Jask County, Hormozgan Province, Iran. At the 2006 census, its population was 130, in 23 families.
