= List of mirs of Badakhshan =

The Mir of Badakhshan or Yarid Dynasty was a ruling Uzbek dynasty in Emirate of Badakhshan, in a region that is now divided among Afghanistan and Tajikistan.

From 1657 until 1873, the rulers of Badakhshan belonged to the Yarid dynasty. They were Muslims belonging to the Sunni branch of Islam. These rulers usually carried the titles of Shah, Mir, or Amir. In 1873 the last Mir of Badakhshan became a pensioner of Kabul and all power shifted to the Hakim of Badakhshan.

== List ==
Below is a list of the Mirs of Badakhshan along with their dates of reign and brief biographical descriptions.

- Mir Yar Beg Sahibzada میر یار بیگ صاحبزاده (1657–1708). The Mir had ten sons when he died in 1708. He divided the province of Badakhshan amongst his nine sons.
- Sulaiman Beg I سلیمان بیگ یکم (1708–1713)
- Yusuf 'Ali Khan یوسف علی خان (1713–1718)
- Ziya al-Din ضیا‌ءالدین (1718–1737)
- Mir Padshah میر پادشاه (17??)
- Sulaiman Beg II سلیمان بیگ دوم (17??)
- Sultan Shah I سلطان شاه یکم (1748–1768). Fought with the rulers of Shughnan and Darvaz. Forced to submit to Afghan rule in 1768.
- Conquest of Badakhshan by Qubad Khan of Qataghan فتح بدخشان توسط قباد خان قطغن (1768–?)
- Bahadur Shah بهادر شاه(17??)
- Aqsaqal Bahadur آقسقال بهادر (17??)
- Mir Muhammad Shah میر محمد شاه (1792–1821). Son of Mir Sultan Shah.
- Sultan Shah II سلطان شاه دوم (182??)
- Mir Yar Beg میر یار بیگ (182??), was the Mir of Badakhshan in the early 19th century until he was defeated by the khan of Kunduz, Mir Muhammad Murad Beg.
- Mir Shah میر شاه (1844–1864). Also known as Zaman al-Din Shah زمان الدین شاه. His brother was Mir Yusuf 'Ali, the Mir of Rustaq.
- Jahandar Shah جهاندار شاه (1864–1869). Jahandar Shah came to power through his close relations with Muhammad Afzal Khan, who was Governor of Afghan Turkestan from 1852–1864. At one point Jahandar Shah raised forced in Badakhshan and briefly took control of Kunduz in 1866–67. He was ousted from power in 1869 by Sardar Faiz Muhammad Khan, an ally of Sher Ali Khan, the Amir of Afghanistan. Faiz Muhammad Khan appointed Jahandar Shah's nephew, Mizrab Shah, in power.
- Mizrab Shah مضراب شاه (1866/7). He was installed in power by Faiz Muhammad Khan, but his reign lasted less than a year. He was the nephew of Jahandar Shah.
- Mahmud Shah محمود شاه (1869–1873). Mahamad Shah was a paternal cousin of Mizrab Shah. He established his authority in Badakhshan with the aid of Amir Sher Ali Khan. He was the last mir to ruler over Badakhshan. In 1873 Mahmud Shah was ousted from power by the governor of Afghan Turkestan, Naib Muhammad Alam Khan. Alam Khan appointed Hafizullah Khan as governor of Badakhshan.

== See also ==
- List of mirs of Shighnan
