= Agha Bozorg Mosque =

Mosque in Kashan, Iran

Āghā Bozorg Mosque
- مسجد آقا بزرگ
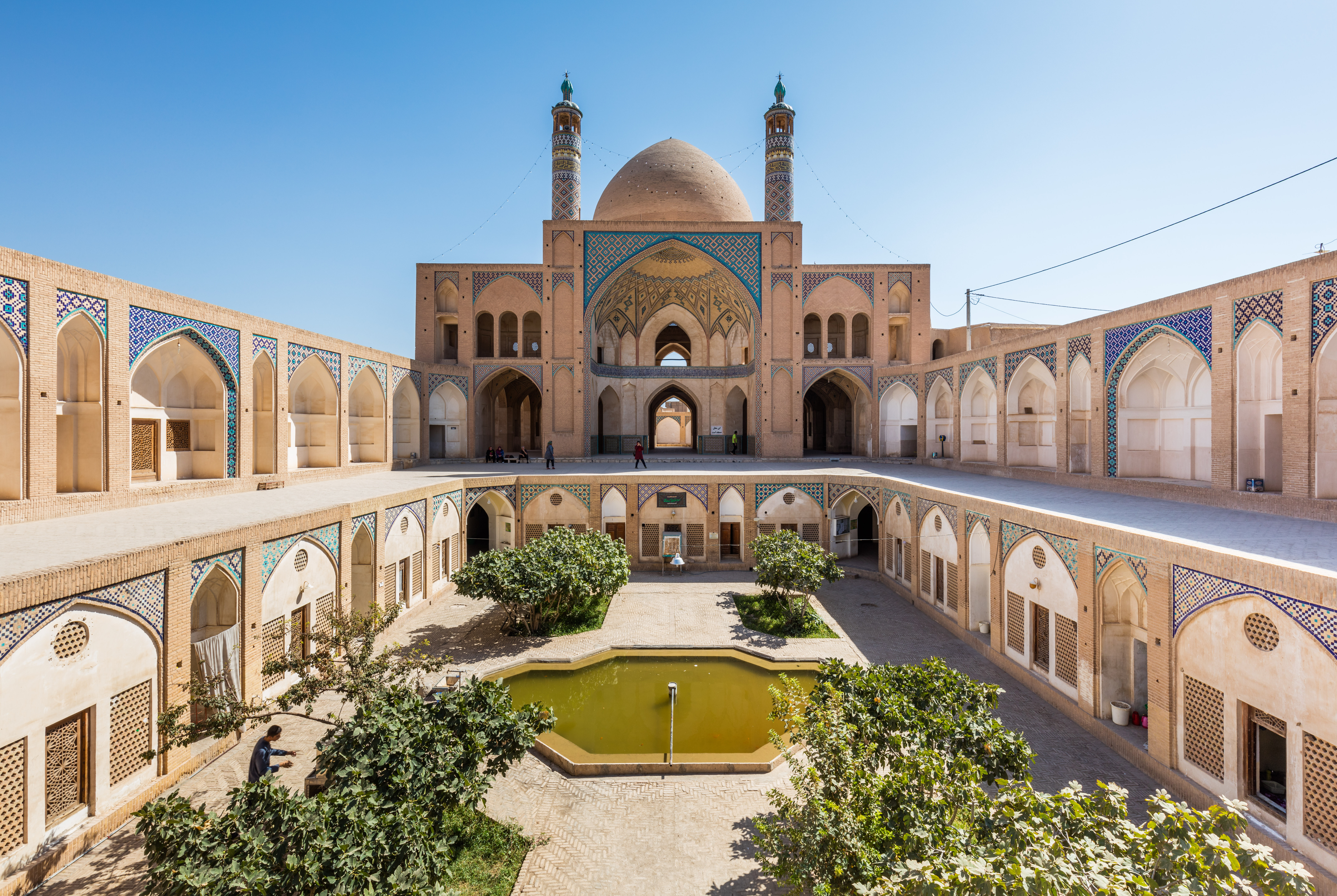
- View of the mosque and its sunken courtyard.

- Location of the mosque in Iran

Religion
- Affiliation: Shia Islam
- Ecclesiastical or organisational status: Mosque and madrasa
- Status: Active
- Named in honor of: Mulla-Mahdi Naraqi II (known as Āghā Bozorg)

Location
- Location: Kāshān, Kāshān County, Isfahan Province
- Country: Iran
- Coordinates: 33°58′43″N 51°26′43″E

Architecture
- Type: Mosque architecture
- Style: Qajar
- Founder: Ustad Haj Sa'ban-ali
- Groundbreaking: 1844 CE
- Completed: 1850

Specifications
- Dome: One (maybe more)
- Minaret: Two

Iran National Heritage List
- Official name: Agha Bozorg Mosque
- Type: Mosque
- Designated: 1951
- Reference no.: 382
- Conservation organization: Cultural Heritage, Handicrafts and Tourism Organization of Iran

The Agha Bozorg Mosque (Persian: مسجد آقابزرگ, romanized: Masjed-e Āghā Bozorg) is a mosque and madrasa in Kashan, in the province of Isfahan, Iran. The mosque and madrasa is located in the center of the city.

An inscription dates the building from 1248 AH (1832/1833 CE), with other evidence indicating that the mosque was built between 1844 and 1850 by master-mi'mar Ustad Haj Sa'ban-ali in honor of Mulla-Mahdi Naraqi II, known as Āghā Bozorg. (Note: Also known as Aqa Buzurg and Agha Bozorg.) The mosque was added to the Iran National Heritage List on 3 December 1951, administered by the Cultural Heritage, Handicrafts and Tourism Organization of Iran.

The complex is a major tourist attraction of the area; and is located adjacent to the Khaje Taj od-Din Mausoleum, that was completed during the 15th century CE.

== Architecture ==
The mosque was described as "the finest Islamic complex in Kashan and one of the best of the mid-19th century". It is noted for its symmetrical design, completed in the Qajar style.

The building occupies a long, roughly rectangular footprint oriented northwest to southeast. A sunken sahn built on two levels (ground level and balcony) occupies the center of the complex. The entrance to the complex is on the northwestern side, at the end of a high street lined with shops. It takes the form of an arched, domed, iwan-portal. This portal leads onto a large, domed vestibule, which overlooks the courtyard from an arched aperture placed directly across from the entrance portal.

Flanking this aperture are two archways leading onto a flight of a few stairs that give onto an open roof terrace overlooking both levels of the courtyard. On either side of these two archways (to the right and left as one enters the vestibule) are two broad corridors that descend on ramps and turn at right angles, leading onto arched entrances at either end of the northwestern facade of the courtyard's upper level.

The upper level of the courtyard is flanked on the northwest side by the roof terrace; on the southeastern side by the facade of a monumental mosque; and on its two lateral sides (southwest and northeast) by rows of blind niches, deep enough to sit in. This level serves as a balcony overlooking the sunken ground level of the courtyard.

The ground level is accessible through flights of stairs leading onto hallways that emerge at its four corners. It has a pool at its center and is surrounded on three sides by dormitories for madrasa students. On the northwestern side, under the roof terrace and entrance pavilion, is a basement (sardab) that consists of a large open space vaulted with wide arches. Wind catchers (badgir) in the form of towers rise from this subterranean structure, flanking the entrance pavilion.

The mosque adjoining the southeastern side of the main court takes the form of a domed pavilion (gunbad-khanah) flanked on one side by a small open court and on the other by a hypostyle prayer hall (shabistan). Its facade facing the southwestern side of the courtyard consists of a large, arched iwan rising two stories, framed by a rectangular pishtaq and flanked by archways rising one story surmounted by balconies overlooking the courtyard and the central iwan. Two minarets rise from either end of the iwan's pishtaq.

The interior of the structure consists of a central, octagonal chamber with a large dome directly behind the central iwan, open through archways on each of its eight sides to an ambulatory surrounding it on three sides. The two side arches on the main courtyard facade lead onto the side arms of the ambulatory. The northeastern arm of the ambulatory opens onto the small side court, while the southwestern arm opens onto the shabistan, which is a rectangular space divided into six aisles of five bays each by twenty freestanding pillars. A single mihrab marks the direction of prayer under the southernmost bay on the southwestern wall of the room.

The rear of this building opens onto a third open air court, which overlooks a smaller sunken court (on ground level), on its southeastern side.

== Gallery ==
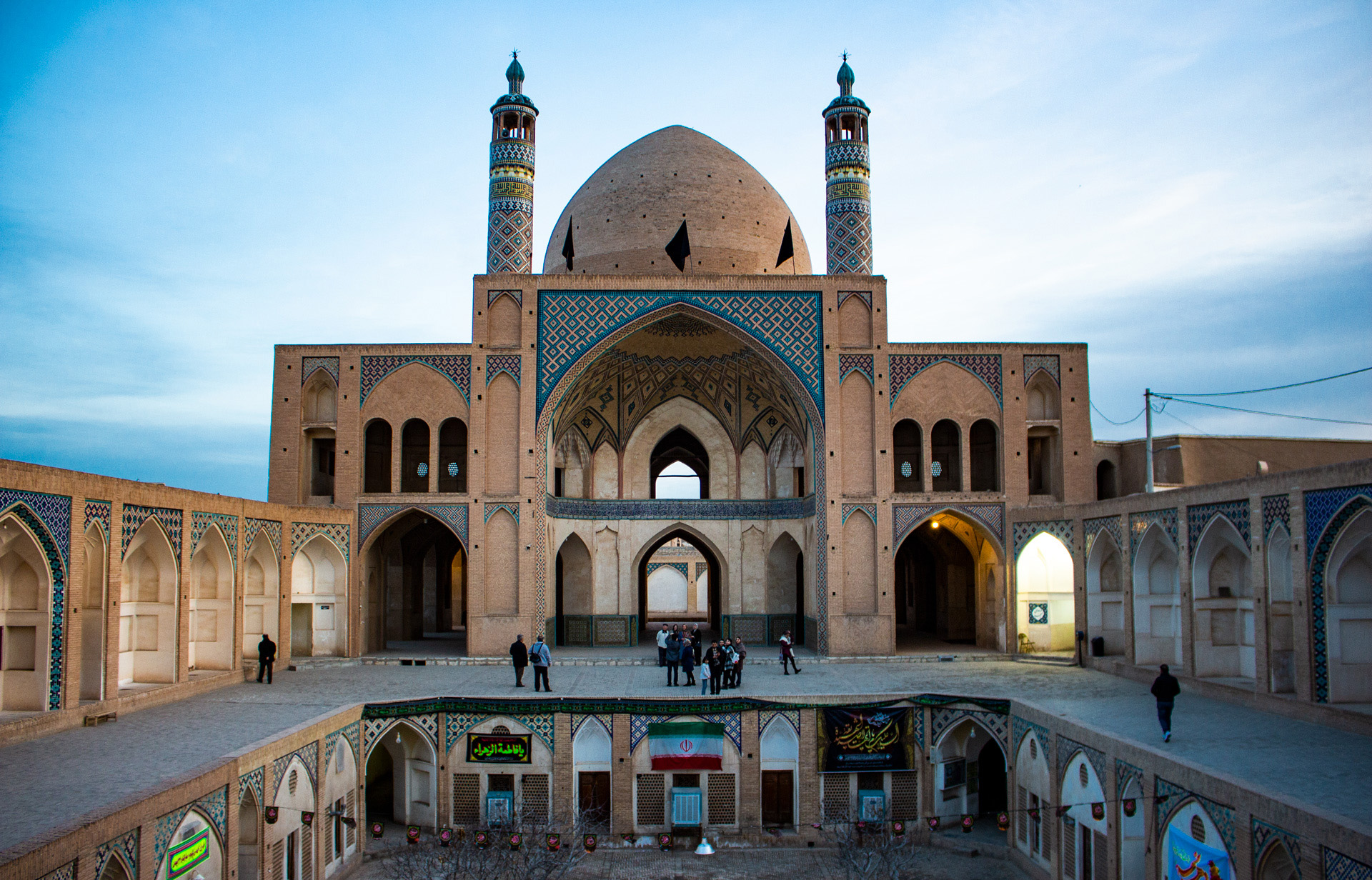
A view of the front door

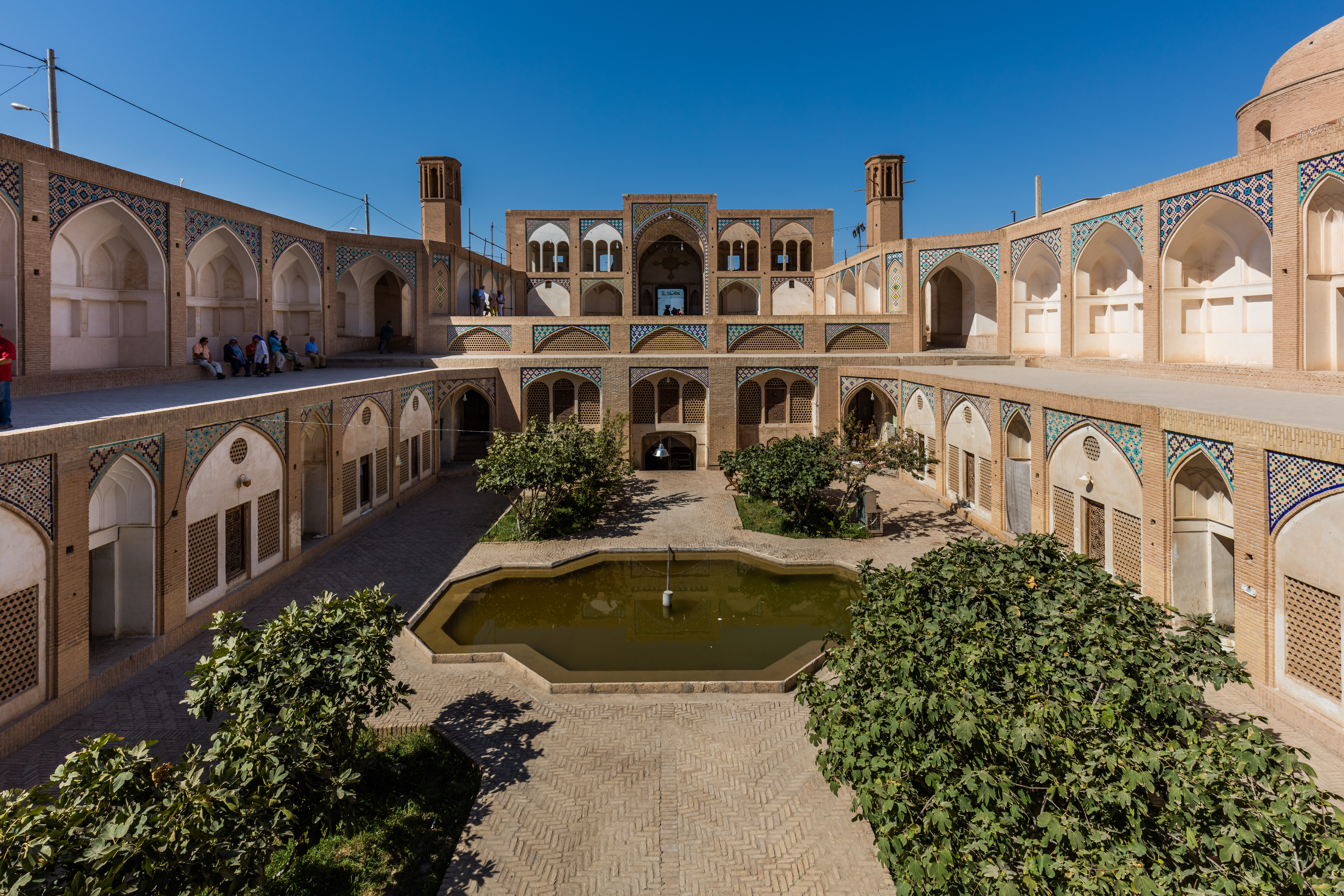
A view of the courtyard

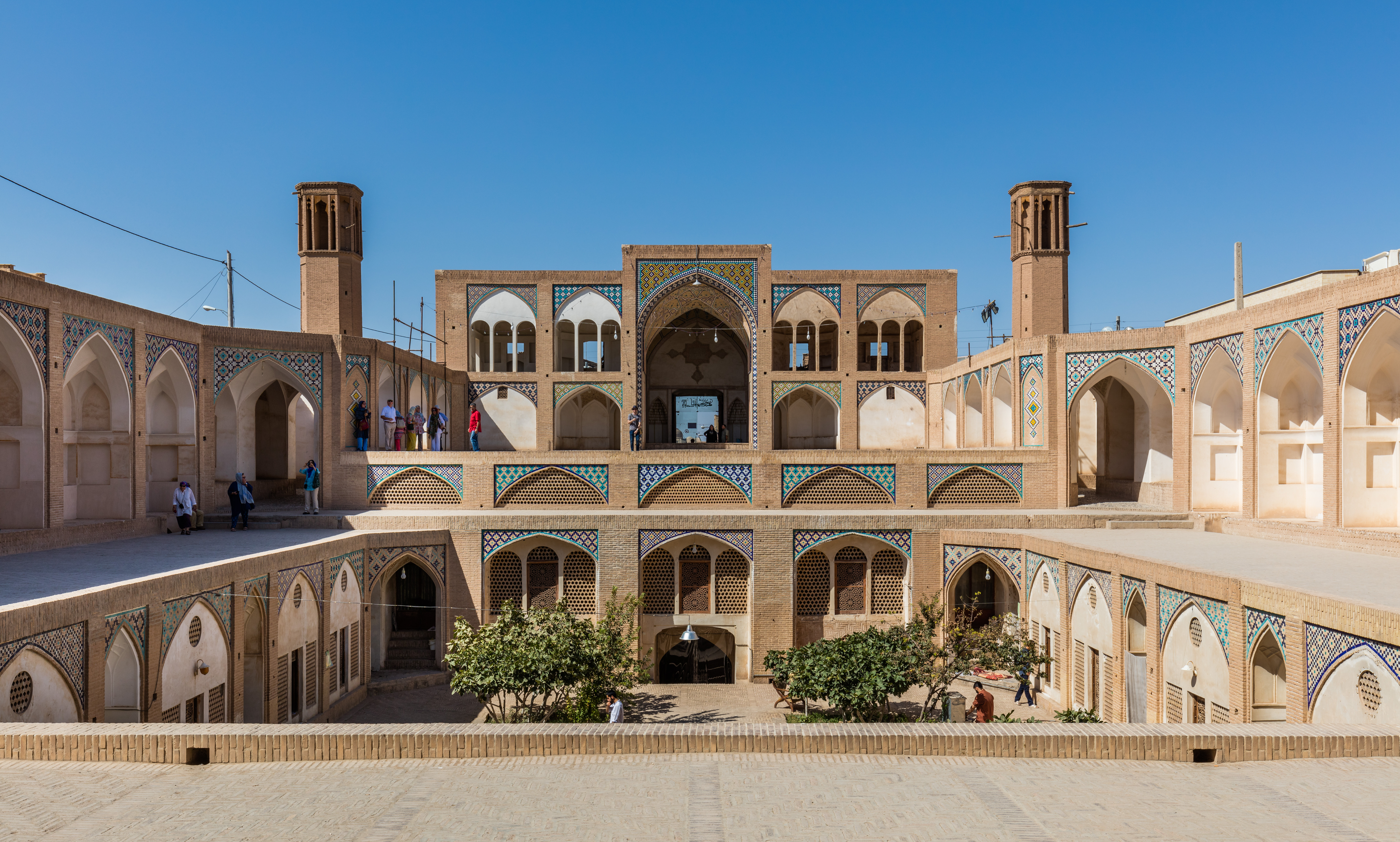
The symmetry in design is a trademark of Islamic architects

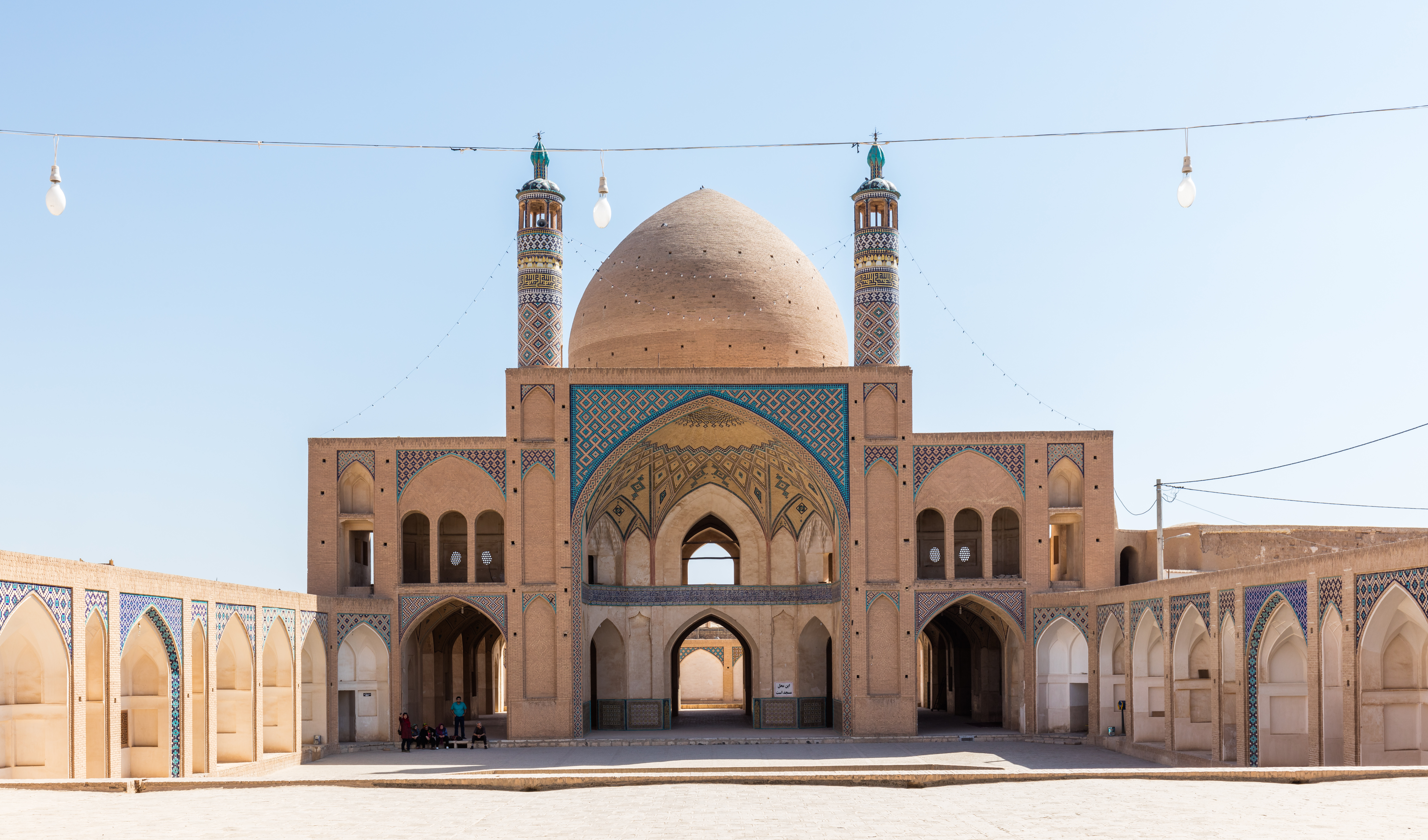
Main mosque building

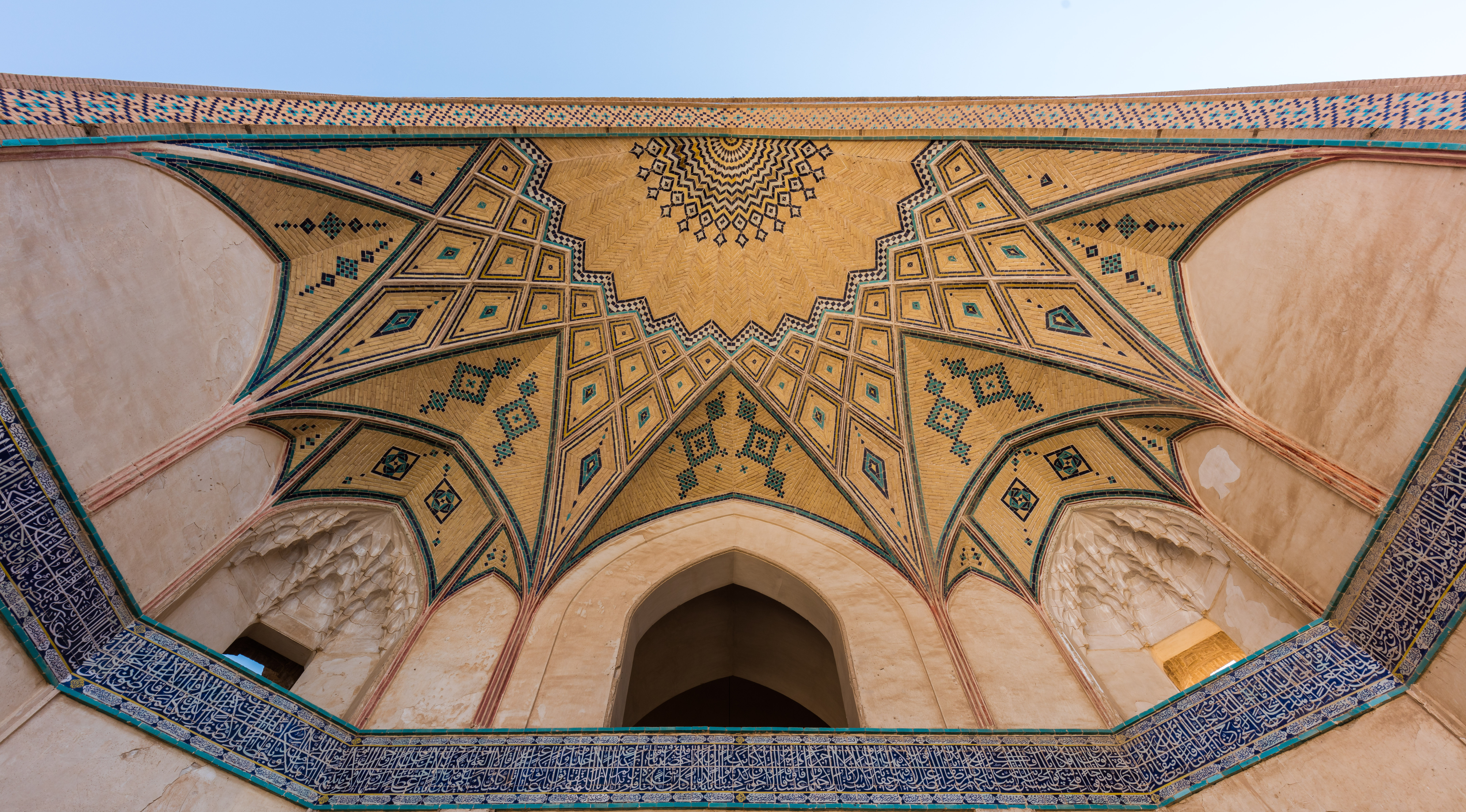
Detail of an iwan

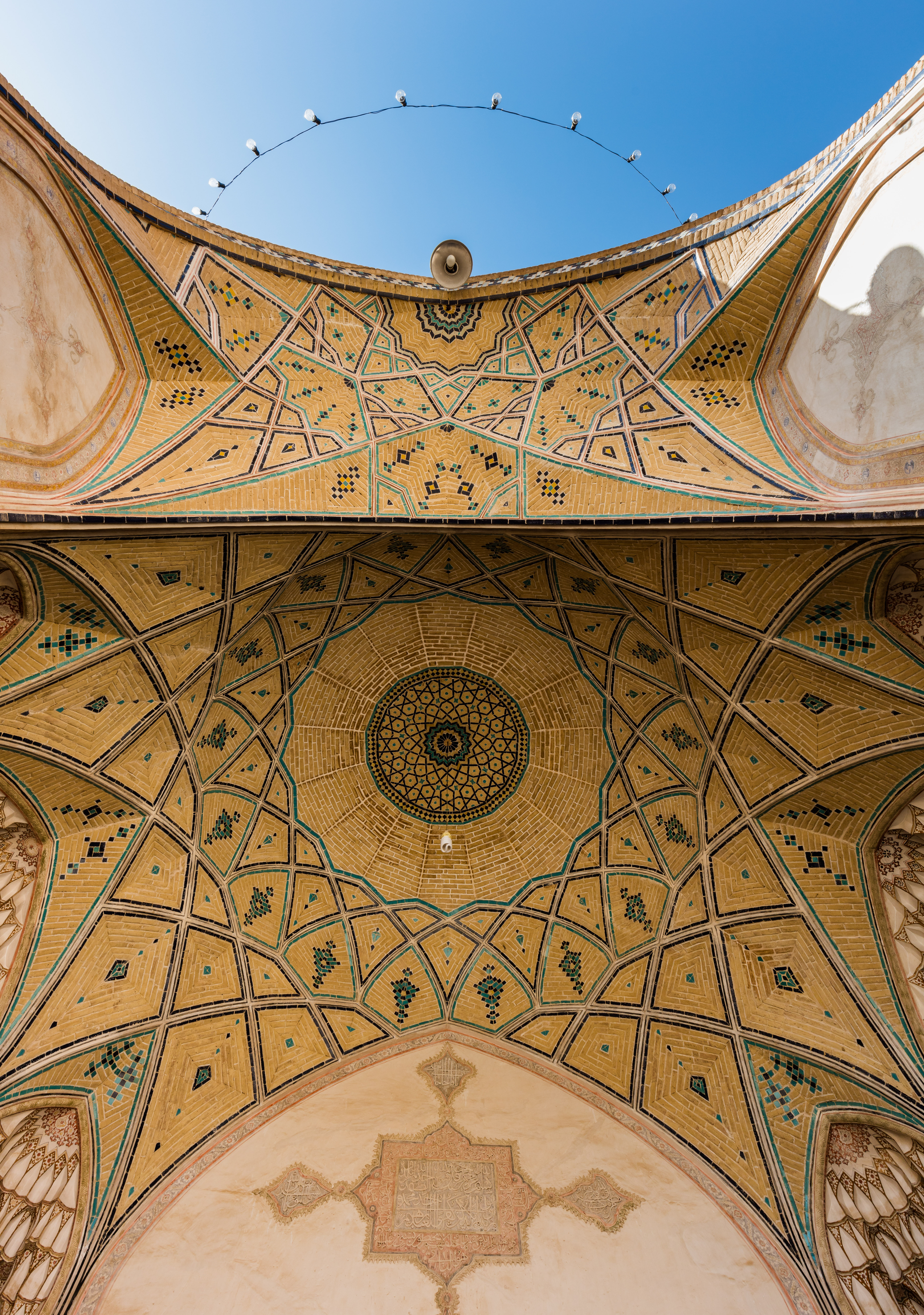
Ceiling

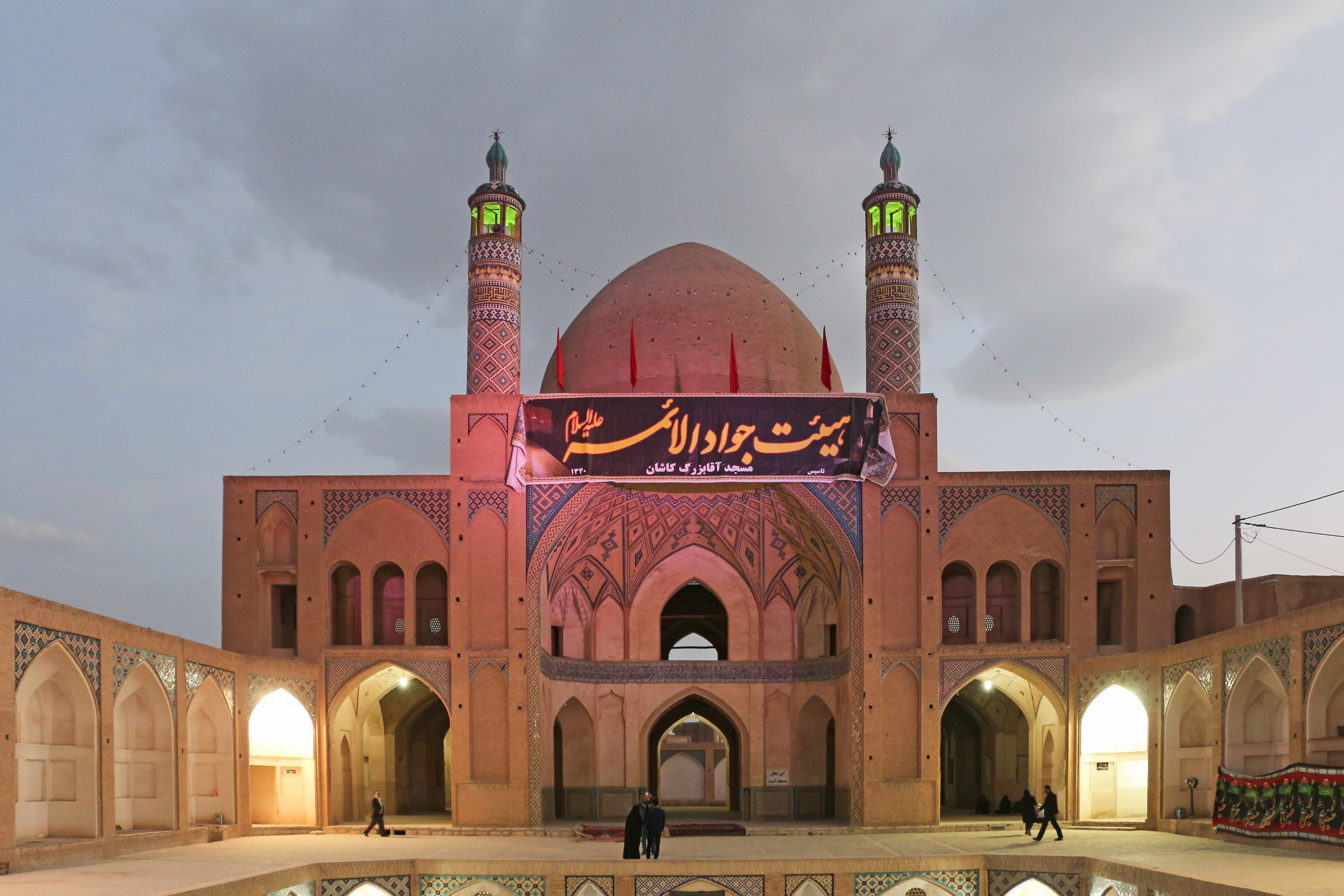
The mosque at sunset

== See also ==
- Shia Islam in Iran
- List of mosques in Iran
