= Katagans =

Mongol clan

The Katagans are a medieval Mongol tribe related to Genghis Khan. In the period of Mongol conquest, Katagans assimilated with Turkic tribes, which played a significant role in their Turkification and integration into the Turco-Mongol cultural sphere. This process contributed to the ethnogenesis of modern Kazakhs, Kyrgyz, Karakalpaks, Uzbeks, Buryats, Uyghurs, Hazaras, and others. Katagans are one of major subrgoup of the Khalkha Mongols. In the 16th century, Gersenji Jalair Khan, the younger son of Batumöngke Dayan Khan of Northern Yuan Mongol Empire, became the ruler of Khalkha Mongols, and under him were seven major Mongol otogs, one of the largest of which was the Katagins. The Katagins became a major tribe in Khalkha Mongols and later in modern-day Mongolia.

== Origins ==
The Katagan Mongol tribe is said to originate from Buha-Hatagi – the eldest son of Mongol mother Alan Gua. The Katagan tribe came to Transoxiana together with the son of Genghis Khan, Chagatai, and played a significant role in the political history and ethnogenesis of many modern Turkic peoples.

The Katagans are referred to in the works of Rashid ad Din, namely in his historical ethnographic work Jami' al-tawarikh written in the early 14th century.

According to The Secret History of the Mongols, the origin of Katagans is the following:

- Borte-Chino, born by the order of the Higher Heaver. His wife was Gia-Maral and they descent being Bata-Chigan.
- The son of Bata-Chigan – Timacha
- The son of Timacha – Horichar-Mergan
- The son of Horichar-Mergan – Auchjam-Boroul
- The son Auchjam-Boroula – Sali-Hachau
- The son of Sali -Hachau – Eke-Nidun
- The son of Eke-Nidun – Sim-Sochi
- The son of Sim-Sochi – Harchu
- The son of Harchu – Bordjigadai-Mergan was married to Mongolchin-goa
- The son of Mongolchin-goa – Torolchin-Bayan was married to Borohchin-goa
- The son of Torolchin: Duva-Sohor and Dobun-Mergan
- Dobun-Mergan married Alan-goa, the son Hori-Tumat Horilartay-Mergan, born in Arih-usune. They had two sons: Bugunotai and Belguntonai
- After the death of Dobun-Mergana, widowed Alan-goa bore three sons from a Mythical Yellow Light (probably a relative noble of Dobun-Mergen)

Bugu-Hadagi, Buhatu-Salchi and Bodonchar-Prostak.

- Belguntai became the forefather of the Belgunot tribe
- Bugunotai became the forefather of the Bugunot tribe
- Bugu-Hatagi became the forefather of the Katagans
- Buhutu-Salchi became the forefather of the Salchuyit tribe
- Bodonchar became the forefather of the Borchigin generation – the origin of Genghis Khan

== Katagans as part of the Uzbeks ==
Some sources speak of the Katagans as being part of the Uzbek tribes in the mid-16th century. The Katagans are mentioned in the lists of 92 Uzbek tribes.

Muhammad Yar Arab Katagan, a famous descendant of the Uzbek Katagan tribe, was a 16th-century historian and the author of Musahhir al-bilad ('The conquest of lands') in Persian on the history of the Shaybanids. Uzbek Katagans used to live in the territories of Horzem, Tashkent, Surhandaryinsk, and Kashkadayin regions and in the Fergana Region of Uzbekistan. The Katagans used to live in the territories of Tajikistan and Afghanistan as well. According to the 2010 census in Tajikistan, there were 7601 Katagans living there. According to historical data, in the 1640s, the Katagans were one of the strong tribes living in Balha and partly in Kunduz, Afghanistan. During the Ashtarhanid era, the Balha region was given to the Katagans as a nomad camp. At the same time, the Katagans formed a strong political alliance. In the beginning of the 17th century during the reign of Muhmudbyi, Balh and Badakhshan became known as the land of the Katagans.

In the 19th century, numerous Uzbek Katagans lived in Kunduz, Afghanistan. Katagans in Kunduz and Tash-kurgan were considered to be the descendants of 16 sons, each of whom was descended from separate clans. Five sons were from one mother – the Besh Bola group. The other 11 sons were from a different mother – the Chegun group. Besh Bola was divided into the following clans: Kesamir, Djung, Katagan, Luhan, Tas, Munas. The Munas were divided into Chuchugar, Chechka, Yugul, Sirug, Temuz, Burka, and Berdja. The Chegun consisted of Murad, Basuz, Ssiri Katagan, Churag, Djuduba, Katagan Kurasi, Murad Shaih, Adjigun, Kin, Kudagun, and Semiz.

The Uzbek Katagans of southern Uzbekistan speak the Kipchak and Karluk-Chigil dialects of the Uzbek language, which is evidenced by ethnolinguistic research. The Tohchi Katagans that used to live in the Surhan-Sherabad oasis speak the Karluk-Chigil dialect of with "yi" later, such as Turks and Karluks.

== Katagans as part of the Kazakhs ==
According to Mukhamedzhan Tynyshpaev, the Katagans made Tursun Khan, the ruler of Tashkent, the major power of Kazakh Khan, who was defeated in war in 1628 by another Kazakh Khan, Esim Khan. Afterwards, the numerous and powerful Katagan tribe split into several: one part which kept the title Chanyshqyly became part of the Kazakhs Elder Zhuz; other parts of Katagan became part of the Uzbeks, Karakalpaks and Kyrgyzs.

According to Abu al-Ghazi Bahadur in "Shedjere-iy Türk", the Kazakh Katagans were destroyed in 1628 with the assassination of Tursun Khan. The ease of their destruction is explained by the fact that most of the tribe left for Kashgaria at the end of the 16th century, the time of Yarkent Khanate's Abdul Karim Khan's rule. They thus became few in number and very vulnerable. The Katagans who migrated to Kashgaria were headed by Ghazi Sultan, who was given the Kargarlyk land by the Khan of Yarkent. His descendants held state positions later on and the Katagans assimilated with the local Uyghurs.

In 1627, the historian Abu al-Ghazi Bahadur fled Khiva from his brother Asfendiar and was received by Esim, who lived in the mountains of Turkestan. Three months later, another Kazakh Khan, Tursun, who owned Tashkent, arrived. Esim handed an honorary refugee over to Tursun, with whom Abu al-Ghazi Bahadur moved to Tashkent. Further, Abu al-Ghazi Bahadur reports that two years later Esim Khan attacked Tursun Khan and "killed him and slaughtered the Katagans".

Traditions that have survived among the clan of the Chanyshqyly in the Tashkent district state that their Khan was once Tursun, who was killed by Esim. After that, most of the Katagans fled to Bukhara, and the remaining ones began to be named after the branch of the Chanyshqyly Katagans.

Chokan Valikhanov, speaking about the Elder Zhuz of Kazakh, notes:

Katagans are the most ancient people living in the south of Central Asia and Kazakhstan. At the beginning of the 17th century. they formed the main support force of the ruler of Tashkent – Tursun Khan, and in the middle of the 17th century, part of them became part of the Uzbeks, and the other part was part of the Kazakh Chanyshqy tribe.

== Sources ==
- Rashididdin. Collection of annals. M .; L., 1952. T. 1-2. Book. 1-2.
- Abu-l Ghazi Bahadurhan. Shazharayi Turk. Tashkent, 1992.
- Burkhaniddin Khan of Kushkek. Kattagan and Badakhshan / translated from Persian. Tashkent, 1926.
- Grebenkin AD Uzbeks: Collected Works, Vol. "Russian Turkestan". Issue. 2. Tashkent, 1872.
- Materials on the regionalization of Central Asia. Book. 1, 2. The territory and population of Bukhara and Khorezm. Part 1. Bukhara. Part 2. Khorezm. Tashkent, 1926.
- Karmysheva B. Kh. Essays on the ethnic history of the southern regions of Tajikistan and Uzbekistan. M., 1976.
- Valikhanov Ch. Legends and tales of the Great Kirghiz-Kaisatsky Horde: Alma-Ata, 1961. Vol. 1.
- Aristov N.A. Experience of elucidating the ethnic composition of the Kirghiz Cossacks of the great Horde // Living Antiquity. Issue. 3, 4. 1894. P. 405.
- Ghazi Alim. Katagans from the Uzbek tribes and their language // Ilmiy Fikr. 1930. № 1.
- Tynyshpaev M. Materials on the history of the Kirghiz-Kazakh people. Tashkent, 1925
