= Mir Yar Beg Sahibzada =

Central Asian ruler

Mir Yar Beg Sahibzada (Persian: میر یار بیگ صاحبزاده) was a Central Asian ruler was the first known Mir of Badakhshan.

== Biography ==
Mir Yar Beg in 1651 became chief of the Tajik tribes in Yaftal, as they had invited him to come to them from Samarkand. However, two years later his dissatisfied subjects rebelled against him, built a fort at Lai Aba, and raised the Tajik Shah Imad (Qazi Arab's father-in-law) as their chief. Mir Yar Beg then retired to the court of Aurangzeb in India via Chitral. At that time Shah Nasir was the ruler of Chitral. Both the ruling families of Badakhshan and Chitral had decades-long genial relationships. Shah Nasir Rais welcomed the ousted ruler of Badakhshan and his family members; elder son Qazi Arab; two years old grandson Qazi Arbab; and daughter-in-law (wife of Qazi Arab) in Chitral. Mir Yar Beg calculatingly left behind his son Qazi Arab and his family in Chitral and traveled to Hindustan. To update his father about the Badakhshan's situation, Qazi Arab had succeeded to keep up linkages with their brothers and notable elites of Badakhshan.

On the other hand, the Badakhshanis, according to their nature and custom became dissatisfied with the reign of Shah Imad, and secretly sent a group of Badakhshi elites via Chitral to fetch Mir Yar Beg from Hindustan. On oath, they guaranteed his safety in Badakhshan and thus he agreed to regain control of Badakhshan in his hand. The Badakhshi representatives and Mir Yar Beg reached Chitral where he advised his son Qazi Arab to stay in Chitral and asked Shah Nasir Rais to settle him in Chitral.

Mir Yar began his crusade of Badakhshan salvage from Chitral, knowingly leaving his dog behind with Qazi Arab in Chitral. On reaching the mountain of Khatanza he refused to go on, and to find out the intentions of the Badakhshanis towards him and to find out their good faith, he said—" until you bring me my dog from Chitral, I will not move a step forward from this place." The Badakshanis went to Chitral and brought the dog. When he reached Zebak the Badakshanis raised the standard of revolt against Shah Imad, and turned him out of the government.

According to the Taʾrīkh-i- Badakhshan (written within 542 pages by the historian and famous calligrapher Munshi Muhammad Hossian during the reign and order of Mir Yarbeg.) and the Armughan-i- Badakhshan, Mir Yar Beg had several sons, possibly with different wives. Mir Yar Beg died in 1699, leaving behind ten sons and dividing Badakhshan among his nine sons. A Persian manuscript, written by Walizada Qazi Arab the elder son of Mir Yar Beg in 1662, gives the genealogical account of the latter's ten sons. It also narrates that Shah Nasir Rais settled Walizada Qazi Arab in Chunj village of Chitral and also gave him agriculture and pasture lands in Yarkhun valley near Tupkhana-i-Ziabeg. The descendants of Walizada Qazi Arab are living in Chunj, Khoosh, and Yarkhun valley in upper Chitral.
