= List of mirs of Shighnan =

The Mir of Shighnan was the ruler of Shighnan, whose seat of power was at Qaleh Barpanjeh (قلعه برپنجه). In 1883 the last Mir of Shighnan, Yusuf Ali Khan, was ousted by the Afghan government.

- Shah Mir شاه میر (1779 - 1787).
- Shah Vanji شاه ونجی (1787 - 1799) – Ruled at the end of the 18th century. A stone inscription in Shughnan, recorded by Ney Elias (who incorrectly converted the date), shows that Shah Vanji built a canal in Khust in 1204 A.H. (1789-90 A.D.).
- Qubad Khan قباد خان (1799 - 1844) – son of Shah Vanji.
- 'Abd al-'Aziz Khan عبدالعزیز خان (1844 - 45) - first son of Qubad Khan.
- 'Abd al-Rahim Khan عبدالرحیم خان (1845 - 1867) – second son of Qubad Khan.
- Muhabbat Khan محبت خان (1867 - 1868/69) - son of 'Abd al-Rahim Khan.
- Yusuf Ali Khan یوسف علی خان (1869 - 1883) – Son of Abdur Rahim. He was deposed by Abdur Rahman Khan in 1883.

== See also ==
- List of mirs of Badakhshan
