= Ragh =

- Location in Afghanistan
- Coordinates: 37°32′22″N 70°26′45″E
- Country: Afghanistan
- Province: Badakhshan
- District: Raghistan
- Elevation: 4,961 ft (1,512 m)
- Time zone: + 4.30

Ragh is a town in Badakhshan Province in north-eastern part of Afghanistan. It is the capital of Raghistan District.

== Climate ==
Ragh has a warm-summer humid continental climate (Köppen Dsb) with mild, dry summers and cold, snowy winters.

Climate data for Ragh
Month	Jan	Feb	Mar	Apr	May	Jun	Jul	Aug	Sep	Oct	Nov	Dec	Year
Mean daily maximum °C (°F)	−3.2 (26.2)	−1.4 (29.5)	4.2 (39.6)	10.0 (50.0)	15.1 (59.2)	18.7 (65.7)	21.6 (70.9)	21.3 (70.3)	17.9 (64.2)	12.1 (53.8)	4.9 (40.8)	−1.1 (30.0)	10.0 (50.0)
Daily mean °C (°F)	−9.2 (15.4)	−6.7 (19.9)	−1.3 (29.7)	3.6 (38.5)	8.6 (47.5)	12.4 (54.3)	15.3 (59.5)	14.8 (58.6)	11.2 (52.2)	5.8 (42.4)	−1.8 (28.8)	−8.0 (17.6)	3.7 (38.7)
Mean daily minimum °C (°F)	−15.2 (4.6)	−12.0 (10.4)	−6.8 (19.8)	−2.9 (26.8)	2.1 (35.8)	6.0 (42.8)	9.0 (48.2)	8.3 (46.9)	4.4 (39.9)	−0.6 (30.9)	−8.5 (16.7)	−14.8 (5.4)	−2.6 (27.3)
Source: Climate-Data.org

== See also ==
- Badakhshan Province
