= Shahri Buzurg District =

Shahr-e-Bozorg ولسوالی شهری بوزورگ
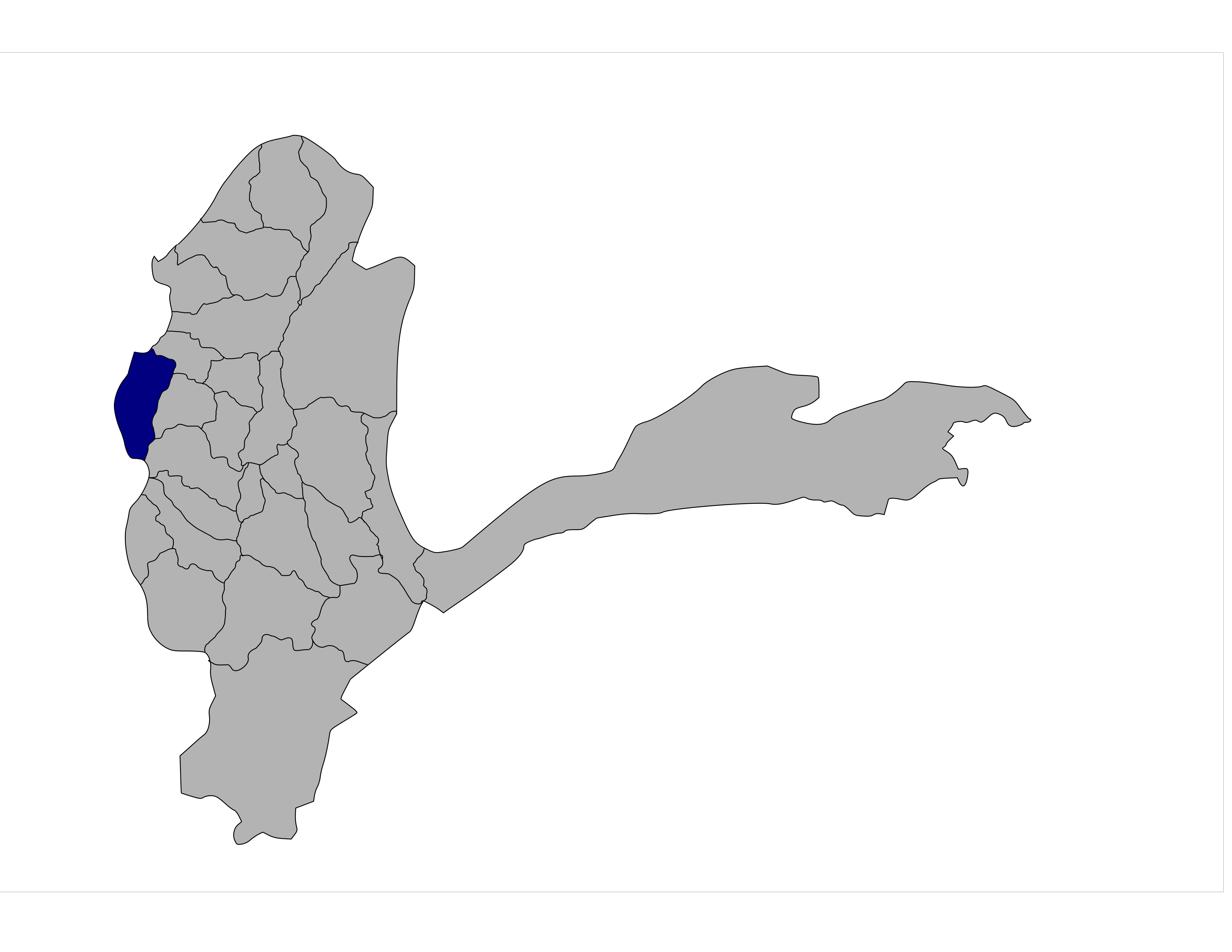

- Location in Afghanistan
- Country: Afghanistan
- Province: Badakhshan
- Capital: Shahr-e Bozorg

Government
  - Type: District
  - District Governor: Mahfoozullah Hamdard

Population (2024)
  - Total: 67,000
- Time zone: UTC+04:30 (AFT)

Shahr-e-Bozorg (Dari: ولسوالی شهری بوزورگ, romanized: Wuluswali Šahre Bozorg) is one of the 28 districts of Badakhshan province in northeastern Afghanistan. According to latest estimates, approximately 67,000 people live in the district.

The district of Shahr-e-Bozorg is located in the western part of the province, east of Takhar Province and south of the Afghanistan–Tajikistan border. To the northeast is Yawan District, to the east is Yaftali Sufla District and to the southeast is Argo District.

Shahr-e-Bozorg along with the surrounding and nearby districts were affected by the 2005 Hindu Kush earthquake. The district also deals with heavy snow and occasional avalanche during winter seasons.

== See also ==
- Districts of Afghanistan
