= Jandar =

Jandar may refer to:

- Jandar, Iran, a village in West Azerbaijan Province
- Jandar, Syria, a village south of Homs
- Jandar (Heroscape), a fictional general in the game HeroScape
- Yaman Jandar (fl. 1292), founder of Candarid beylik (principality) in Anatolia
- Wanda Jandar, a small village in Dera Ismail Khan district of Khyber Pakhtunkhwa, Pakistan.

== See also ==
- Jandar Gol-e Sofla, a village in Bamyan Province, Afghanistan
- Jandar Gol-e ʽOlya, a village in Bamyan Province, Afghanistan
- Wanda Jandar, a village in Dera Ismail Khan, Khyber Pakhtunkhwa, Pakistan
- Jandar of Callisto, 1972 science fantasy novel by Lin Carter
- Jantar (disambiguation)
- Yantar (disambiguation)
