= Jantar =

Jantar may refer to:

- Jantar, Poland, a village in Poland
- Anna Jantar (1950 – 1980), a Polish singer
- SZD-38 Jantar 1, a glider designed and produced in Poland from 1971
  - SZD-41 Jantar Standard, Standard Class glider
  - SZD-42 Jantar 2, Open Class competition glider
  - SZD-48 Jantar Standard 2/3, a Standard Class glider produced in Poland from 1977
- Amber (Russian: янтарь, romanized: jantárʹ), fossilized tree resin

== See also ==
- Jandar (disambiguation)
- Yantra (disambiguation)
- Yantar (disambiguation)
- Jantar Mantar (disambiguation)
