= Wanda Chunda =

Village in Pakistan

Coordinates: 32°15′07″N 70°44′29″E

Chunda (Urdu:وانڈہ چنڈہ) is a village of district Dera Ismail Khan, province Khyber Pakhtunkhwa, Pakistan.

== Location ==
Wanda Chunda is located east side of the Dera Ismail Khan-Bannu Road. It is about four kilometer 4 km away from Pakistan famous Cement Factory, Lucky Cement Factory(Darra Pezu) . it is situated on the Peshawar-Karachi highway road.

== Nearby areas ==
There are small villages lying around Chunda (i.e. Wanda Kali, Obbo Wanda, Garra Imam Shah & Wanda Jandar. Famous tourists place Sheikh Badin has a small distance with Chunda. Wanda Chuda is 8 km eight kilometer away from its union council Giloti and having the same distance from Darra Pezu.

== See also ==
Wanda Jandar
