= Jantra =

Jantra may refer to:

- Jantra, Võru County, a village in Estonia
- Jantra (musician), Sudanese musician
- Jantra (album), an album by Zubeen Garg
- Ade Jantra Lukmana (born 1990), Indonesian professional footballer

== See also ==
- Yantar (disambiguation)
- Jantar (disambiguation)
- Yantra (disambiguation)
