= Giloti =

Coordinates: 32°9′53″N 70°45′2″E

Giloti Qalandar Daulatpur Gherbi
- Town and union council
- Interactive map of Giloti
- Country: Pakistan
- Province: Khyber-Pakhtunkhwa
- District: Dera Ismail Khan District
- Time zone: UTC+5 (PST)

Giloti is a town and union council in the Dera Ismail Khan District of Khyber-Pakhtunkhwa. It is located at 32°9'53N 70°45'2E and has an altitude of 180 metres (590 feet).

== Nearby areas ==
Giloti town is 16 km away from Darra Pezu & 8 km from Wanda Chunda. Other nearby areas are Paniala, Yarik, Mehrabi and Wanda Jandar.

== Well Known Tribes of Giloti ==
Abdul Khel, Kundi, Behram khel, Peer khel, Malik, Sheikh, Malakhel, Musyani, Muthikhel, Sarrang, Sharabi Khel, Qasam Khel, Jang khel are the well known subtribes living in Giloti. Which are Pashtuns.

== Agriculture Type ==
This village falls in Arid zone. Soil is mostly sandy and sandy loam. Winter crops include Wheat and Gram while at the onset of Monsoon Sorghum, Millet and Guar are cultivated. Mountain rainy streams (Rodh kohi) from Sheikh Badin Hills irrigate village farms during Monsoon season.

== Culture ==
This village inhabitants speaks Marwat dialct Pashto. Male wear shalwar-kazeez with turban (lungi) on head and a white cotton Chadar on a shoulder. As kundi tribe traces back to Tank while Behram Khel, Peer Khel, Mussian, Sarang, Mayar, Jan Khel, Abdul Khel are also radiated from Lakki Marwat. Wedding, funeral and other celerations are similar to Marwats.
