= Ridali Airfield =

Airfield in Estonia

Ridali Airfield Ridali lennuväli
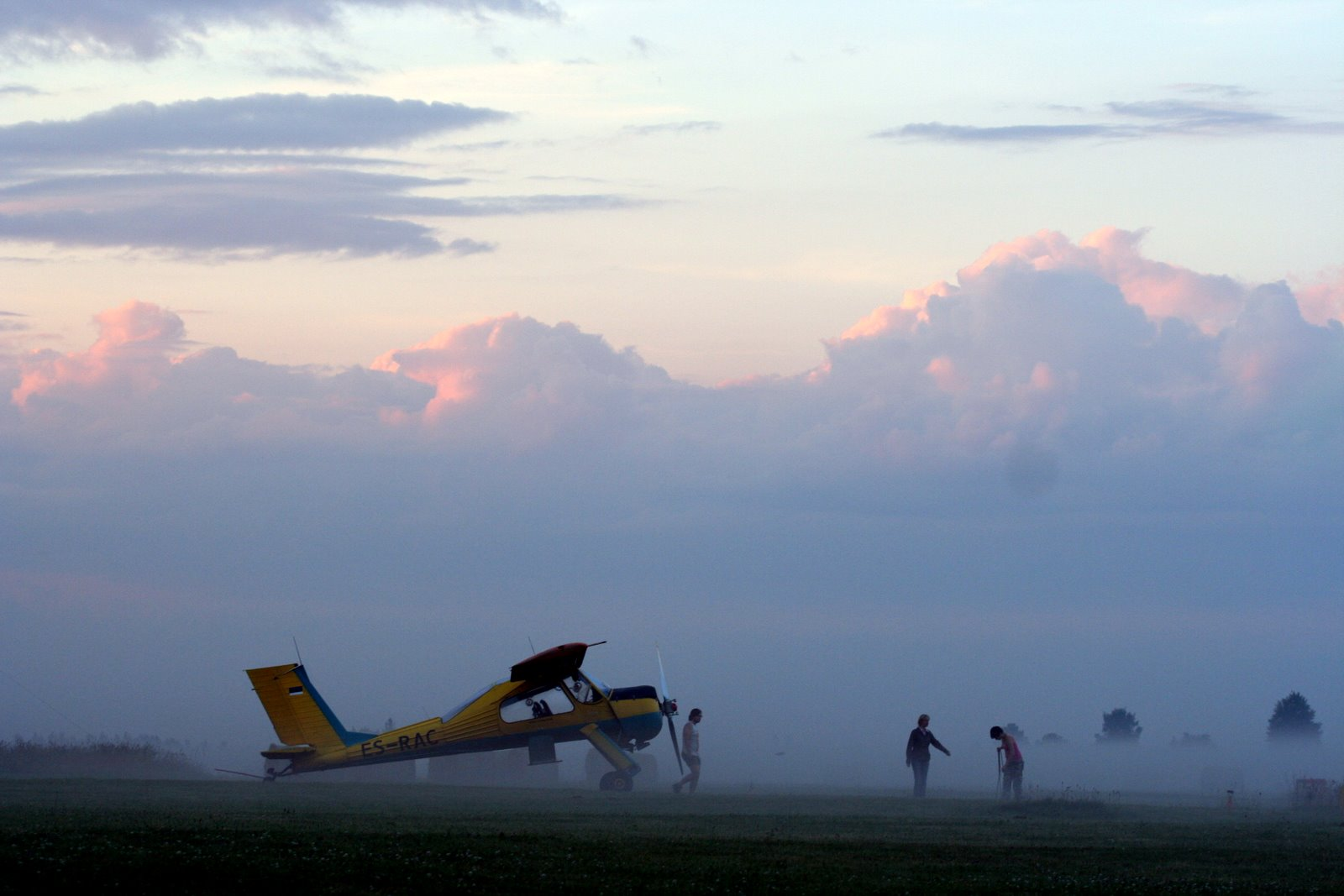
- Wilga tow plane at Ridali airfield in the evening
- IATA: none; ICAO: EERI

Summary
- Airport type: Public
- Operator: Ridali Gliding Club
- Location: Suurküla, Põlva Parish
- Elevation AMSL: 88 m / 289 ft
- Coordinates: 57°56′34″N 026°58′40″E
- Website: http://www.purilend.ee

Map
- Location in Estonia

Runways
Direction	Length		Surface
Direction	m	ft	Surface
18/36	1,100	3,609	Grass
- Sources: Ridali Lennuklubi

Ridali Airfield ((ICAO: EERI); Estonian: Ridali lennuväli) is an airfield in Estonia, about 10 km (6.2 mi) north of Võru in the vicinity of Ridali - a place known for its scenery, lakes, fields and forests, giving glider pilots many visual reference points to navigate by. The airfield was used during World War II, and in the early 1960s it started serving glider pilots. The first gliders to fly in Ridali were Soviet KAI-12s (improved design from the Czech LF-109). The only way to launch gliders was by using the Czech winch "Herkules". By 1968, the club already had two KAI-12s, three Blaníks, two towing winches and a Yak-12 for aerotows.

Ridali Airfield is currently the home of Ridali Gliding Club (Estonian: Ridali Lennuklubi).

== Aircraft in service ==
Aircraft	Origin	Type	Versions	In service
PZL-104 Wilga	Poland	Utility/aerotow	PZL-104 Wilga	2
Morane-Saulnier MS-894A	France	Light aircraft	MS-894A	1
Jonker JS-1 Revelation	South Africa	Glider	JS-1B	1
Glaser-Dirks DG-500	Germany	Glider	DG-505	1
LET L-13 Blaník	Czech Republic	Glider	L-13	4
LAK-12 Lietuva	Lithuania	Glider	LAK-12	1
SZD-48 Jantar Standard 2	Poland	Glider	SZD-48	2
SZD-48 Jantar Standard 3	Poland	Glider	SZD-48-2	2
SZD-42 Jantar 2B	Poland	Glider	SZD-42-2	1
SZD-30 Pirat	Poland	Glider	SZD-30	1
SZD-50 Puchacz	Poland	Glider	SZD-50	1

== See also ==
- List of airports in Estonia
