= Lahe, Põlva County =

Village in Estonia

Coordinates: 57°56′N 26°56′E

Lahe
- Village
- Interactive map of Lahe
- Country: Estonia
- County: Põlva County
- Parish: Põlva Parish
- Time zone: UTC+2 (EET)
  - Summer (DST): UTC+3 (EEST)

Lahe is a village in Põlva Parish, Põlva County in southeastern Estonia.

Place (Estonian: paikkond) called Ridali is located in Lahe. In nearby Suurküla, there is Ridali Airfield (ICAO: EERI).
