= SZD-38 Jantar 1 =

Polish single-seat glider, 1972

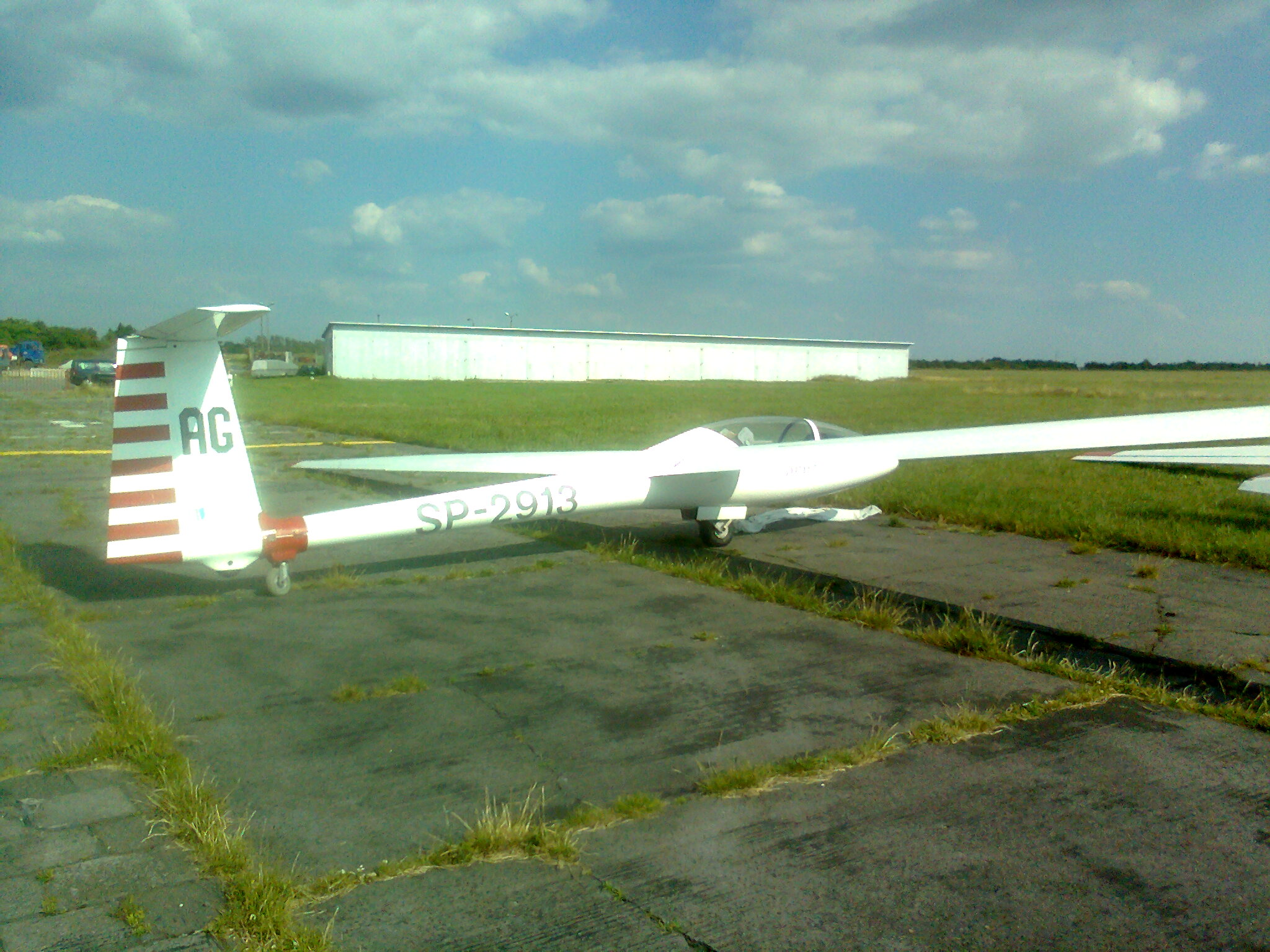

General information
- Type: glider
- National origin: Poland
- Manufacturer: SZD
- Designer: Dipl-Ing. Adam Kurbiel
- Number built: 2 x SZD-37x + 57 x SZD-38

History
- First flight: 14 February 1972
- Variants: SZD designs:-: SZD-41 Jantar Standard; SZD-42 Jantar 2/2b; SZD-48 Jantar Standard 2 and 3; SZD-49 Jantar K; SZD-52 Jantar 15 Krokus

The SZD-38 Jantar 1 (Amber) is a glider designed and produced in Poland from 1971.

== Development ==
After SZD's success in designing high-performance all-wood gliders, the design group's first product using fibreglass emerged as a very competitive glider.

Two prototypes of the SZD-37x Jantar were built (SP-2636 and SP-2637), using fibreglass reinforced plastic fuselage and tail-unit with an aluminium alloy tubular tail boom, SP-2636 was built with a 17.5m span wing and SP-2637 a 19m span wing. The first flight of SP-2636 was carried out on 14 February 1972 and extensive testing carried out before the second prototype, SP-2637 (first flight 13 May 1972), was entered in the 1972 World Gliding Championships at VrŠac in Yugoslavia, taking the first place in the newly established 19m Class and the 3rd in the Open Class, flown by St. Kluk.

Production of the 19m span Jantar commenced as the SZD-38 Jantar 1 in 1973 with 57 built by 1975, 24 for export. The success of the SZD-37x prototypes in the World Championships was not repeated, due partly to shrinkage of the epoxy resin causing irregularities in the wing surfaces, and partly to the improved performance of the competing aircraft. The SZD-38 broke seven Polish National records in 1973, but was soon out-classed in competitions. The standard instrument fit included variometer, turn and bank, compass as well as standard ASI, altimeter etc. Provision was also made for an artificial horizon and oxygen equipment.

== Variants ==
- SZD-37x Jantar – The first two prototype aircraft, SP-2636 with 17.5m span wings and SP-2637 with 19m span wings. Two built.
- SZD-38 Jantar 1 – Production version of the second SZD-37x prototype with 19m span wings. 57 built.

== Specifications ==
=== Specifications (SZD-38) ===
Data from

General characteristics

- Crew: 1
- Length: 7.11 m (23 ft 4 in)
- Wingspan: 19 m (62 ft 4 in)
- Height: 1.61 m (5 ft 3 in)
- Wing area: 13.38 m^{2} (144.0 sq ft)
- Aspect ratio: 27
- Wing profile: Fx-67 K-170 > Fx-67 K-150
- Empty weight: 293 kg (646 lb)
- Gross weight: 417 kg (919 lb) ; 515 kg (1,135 lb) with ballast

Performance

- Maximum speed: 250 km/h (160 mph, 130 kn)
- Stall speed: 65 km/h (40 mph, 35 kn)
- g limits: +5.3 / -2.65
- Maximum glide ratio: 47 at 95 km/h (59 mph; 51 kn)
- Rate of sink: 0.5 m/s (98 ft/min) at 75 km/h (47 mph; 40 kn)

=== Specifications (SZD-37x) ===
Data from

General characteristics

- Crew: 1
- Length: 7.11 m (23 ft 4 in)
- Wingspan: 17.5 m (57 ft 5 in)
- Height: 1.61 m (5 ft 3 in)
- Wing area: 12.77 m^{2} (137.5 sq ft)
- Aspect ratio: 24
- Wing profile: Fx-67 K-170 > Fx-67 K-150
- Empty weight: 266 kg (586 lb)
- Gross weight: 390 kg (860 lb) ; 465 kg (1,025 lb) with ballast

Performance

- Maximum speed: 250 km/h (160 mph, 130 kn)
- Stall speed: 68 km/h (42 mph, 37 kn)
- g limits: +5.3 / -3.5
- Maximum glide ratio: 43 at 100 km/h (62 mph; 54 kn)
- Rate of sink: 0.6 m/s (120 ft/min) at 75 km/h (47 mph; 40 kn)

== See also ==
Aircraft of comparable role, configuration, and era

- Slingsby Kestrel
