= Mantra (disambiguation) =

Mantra means a religious syllable or poem in Sanskrit and Pali.

Mantra, Manthra, Mantr, Mantram, or Mantric may also refer to:

== Religion ==
Manthra is a prayer or inspired utterance in Zoroastrianism

== Film, TV and entertainment ==
- Mantr (film), a 2018 Indian Marathi-language film
- Mantra (2005 film), an Indian Bengali-language film
- Mantra (2007 film), an Indian Telugu-language film
- Mantra (2016 film), an Indian Hindi-language film
- Mantram (film), a 2017 Indian Kannada-language film
- Mantra (actor), Mumbai based actor, television presenter, model, radio jockey and voice over artist
- Mantra (actress), South Indian actress
- Mantra (comics), a comic book series written by Mike Barr and published by Malibu Comics in the mid-1990s
- Mantra Films, Inc., the film company that produces and distributes Girls Gone Wild DVD series

== Music ==
- Mantra Recordings, a subsidiary of Beggars Banquet Records
- Mantric (band), a Norwegian progressive metal band

=== Classical compositions ===
- Mantra (Stockhausen), a 1970 musical composition by the German avant garde composer Karlheinz Stockhausen
- "Mantra", a 2004 work by Romano Crivici
- Three Mantras Op.61, by John Foulds
- Mantra, choral work by Robert Moran

=== Albums ===
- Mantra (Faakhir Mehmood album)
- Mantra (Shelter album)
- Mantra (In Vain album)
- Mantras (Master's Hammer album)
- Mantras (Alien Ant Farm album)
- Mantras (Katie Pruitt album)

=== Songs ===
- "Mantra" (Bring Me the Horizon song), 2018
- "Mantra" (Dave Grohl song), 2013
- "Mantra" (Jennie song), 2024
- "Mantra" (Material song), 1993
- "Mantra", a 2004 song by Nando Reis & Os Infernais
- "Mantra", a song by Anggun, from the album Luminescence, 2005
- "Mantra", a song by King Crimson from the album In the Court of the Crimson King, 1969
- "Mantra", a song by Lauren Mayberry from Vicious Creature, 2024
- "Mantra", a song by Sam Fender from Seventeen Going Under, 2021
- "Mantra", an instrumental by Santana from Welcome, 1973
- "Mantra", a song by Terence Blanchard from A Tale of God's Will (A Requiem for Katrina), 2007
- "Mantra", a song by Tool from their album Lateralus, 2001

== Other ==
- Mantra (restaurant), a Fusion cuisine restaurant in Boston
- "Mantra", a commercial software renderer for producing computer-generated imagery; part of the Houdini suite
- Mantra Group, an Australian hotel company acquired in 2017 by AccorHotels

== See also ==
- Mantar (disambiguation)
