= Jantar Mantar (disambiguation) =

Jantar Mantar (Yantra Mantra) is an Indian equinoctial sundial, consisting a gigantic triangular gnomon with the hypotenuse parallel to the Earth's axis.

Jantar Mantar may also refer to:

== Observatories ==
- Jantar Mantar, Jaipur, houses world's largest stone sundial, a UNESCO World Heritage site
- Jantar Mantar, New Delhi, it consists of 13 architectural astronomy instruments
  - 2026 Delhi Jantar Mantar protests
- Jantar Mantar, Varanasi, observatory built in the year 1737
- Jantar Mantar, Ujjain or Ved Shala, observatory built in the year 1725

== Others ==
- Jantar Mantar (1964 film), a 1964 Indian Hindi-language film
- Jantar-Mantar, public art work by sculptor Narendra Patel, located on the campus of the University of Wisconsin–Milwaukee
- Jantar Mantar (horse), a Japanese thoroughbred racehorse
- "Janthar Manthar", a song by Mani Sharma, Ranjith and Rita from the 2008 Indian film Kantri

== See also ==
- Jantar (disambiguation)
- Mantar (disambiguation)
