= Yantra (disambiguation) =

Yantra may refer to:

- Yantra (river), a river in Bulgaria
- Yantra, Gabrovo Province, a village in the Dryanovo municipality, Gabrovo Province, Bulgaria
- Yantra, Veliko Tarnovo Province, a village in Gorna Oryahovitsa municipality, Veliko Tarnovo Province, Bulgaria
- FC Yantra, a football club from Gabrovo, Bulgaria
- Yantra, a pattern used in Hinduism for worship
- Yantra yoga
- Yantra tattoo
- Yantra Corporation, a software company acquired by Sterling Commerce
- Yantra (armament), an armament manufacturer in India

== See also ==
- Yantar (disambiguation)
- Jantar (disambiguation)
- Jantra (disambiguation)
