= Mantar =

Mantar may refer to:

- Mantar (band) (lit. 'mushroom'), a German metal band
- Mantra in Sikhism
  - Mul Mantar (original mantra), first composition in the Sikh holy text

== See also ==
- Mantra (disambiguation)
- Jantar Mantar (disambiguation)
