= Paniala =

Coordinates: 32°14′35″N 70°52′55″E

- Town and union council
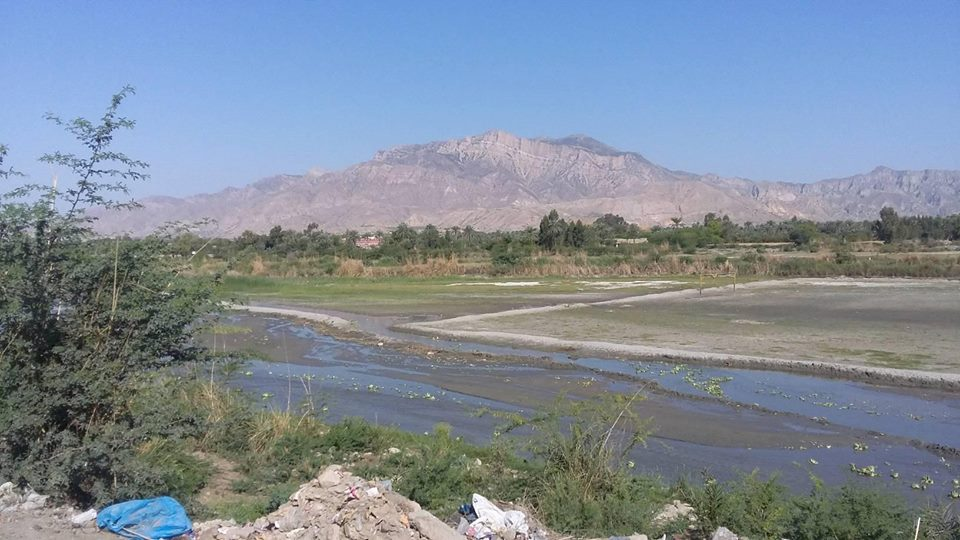
- Paniala Toy
- Interactive map of Paniala
- Country: Pakistan
- Province: Khyber-Pakhtunkhwa
- District: Paharpur District

Government
  - Member of Provincial Assembly (PK-68): Ehtesham Javed Akber Khan (PTI)

Population (2023)
  - Total: 11,669
- Time zone: UTC+5 (PST)
- Area code: 0966

Paniala (Urdu: پنياله Urdu pronunciation: [panjala]) is a small town located in the north of Paharpur District of Khyber-Pakhtunkhwa about 55 km away from Dera Ismail Khan and approx 300 km from provincial capital Peshawar. The Link Road (also known as Gilloti Road) from main Indus Highway (Peshawar Road) that connects with Paniala is of about 18 km. It is a submontane settlement and one of the oldest in Khyber Pakhtunkhwa Province in Pakistan.

== Etymology ==
The name Paniala originated from "Panjh Naala", which means 5 Naalas, stemming from Oobo Sir (in Pashto), which means "head of water", and then combines into one form. The water is then supplied to whole of the village and nearby towns for feeding and cultivating the fields. And then from passage of time the name Panjh Naala changed into Paniala.

== Demographics ==
=== Population ===
Historical population
Year	Pop.	±% p.a.
1951	...	—
1961	...	—
1972	...	—
1981	...	—
1998	...	—
2017	10,821	—
2023	11,669	+1.27%

As of the 2023 census, Paniala had a population of 11,669. The green grassland comprises sandy area and a population of a hundred thousand citizens. The main tribes comprises Bluch lodi Hashmis, and Qureshis marwat. Main local language spoken is Pashto.

== Notable places ==
The prominent shrine of Haji Baba and two important graves of Sahabis are also situated. Fruits of the town include mangoes and dates. "Dhakki" is a major part of export. The nearby picnic spots are TOY (a natural water resort and play ground) and the mountainous hilly region of Sheikh Badin that comprises lush green forest, an old nonfunctioning post office and police station of British time.

== Facilities ==
Paniala town is facilitated with a government hospital, a degree College for male, and high schools for both male and female and higher secondary school for girls. There are five private institutions, Al-Hira Model High School, Pakistan Campus School & College, Muslim Public High School, City Grammar School and Paniala Science School & College. Also there is a Montessori School named The Guardian Montessori School Paniala started in 2017. There are 3 primary schools for boys and 3 primary schools for girls. A post office, a bank HBL (Habib Bank Limited), an agriculture office and Lari Adda (لاری اڈہ) are also in Paniala.

== Sports ==
There is one football stadium & many popular football clubs in Paniala, which produced many talented players like Jaffar Khan, former captain of the Pakistan national football team.

== Notable people ==
- Jaffar Khan, footballer
