= Wanda Jandar =

Jandar
- Village
- Location within Khyber Pakhtunkhwa Location within Pakistan
- Coordinates: 32°12′00″N 70°41′52″E
- Country: Pakistan
- Province: Khyber-Pakhtunkhwa
- District: Dera Ismail Khan District
- Time zone: UTC+5 (PST)
- Area code: 0966

Wanda Jandar (Pashto:جندر وانډه), or Jandar, is a village in Dera Ismail Khan, Khyber Pakhtunkhwa, Pakistan, 12 kilometres (7.5 mi) from Darra Pezu.

== Nearby areas ==
Bahawal Khel, Kikri, Hori, Giloti and Wanda Chunda are some villages which lie around Wanda Jandar.
