= Yantar =

Yantar (Russian: янтарь, romanized: jantár) may refer to:

- Yantar, Kaliningrad, a Special Economic Zone in Russia
- Yantar, a series of reconnaissance satellites
- Yantar, a ship in the Russian Navy
- Yantar (train number: 029Ч/030Ч), the Russian named passenger train linking Moscow Belorussky – Minsk Main – Kaliningrad
- Soyuz 11, a Soviet spaceflight that used the call sign "Yantar"

== See also ==
- Jantar (disambiguation)
- Yantra (disambiguation)
- Jandar (disambiguation)
- Amber (Russian: янтарь, romanized: jantár), fossilized tree resin
