= Jandar, Iran =

Jandar جاندر
- Village
- Location within Iran
- Coordinates: 38°06′21″N 44°24′53″E
- Country: Iran
- Province: West Azerbaijan
- County: Salmas
- Bakhsh: Kuhsar
- Rural District: Shenetal

Population (2006)
  - Total: 365
- Time zone: UTC+3:30 (IRST)
  - Summer (DST): UTC+4:30 (IRDT)

Jandar (Persian: جاندر, also Romanized as Jāndār) is a village in Shenetal Rural District, Kuhsar District, Salmas County, West Azerbaijan Province, Iran. At the 2006 census, its population was 365, in 62 families.
