= Suurküla, Põlva County =

Village in Estonia

Coordinates: 57°56′57″N 27°00′16″E

Suurküla
- Village
- Interactive map of Suurküla
- Country: Estonia
- County: Põlva County
- Parish: Põlva Parish
- Time zone: UTC+2 (EET)
  - Summer (DST): UTC+3 (EEST)

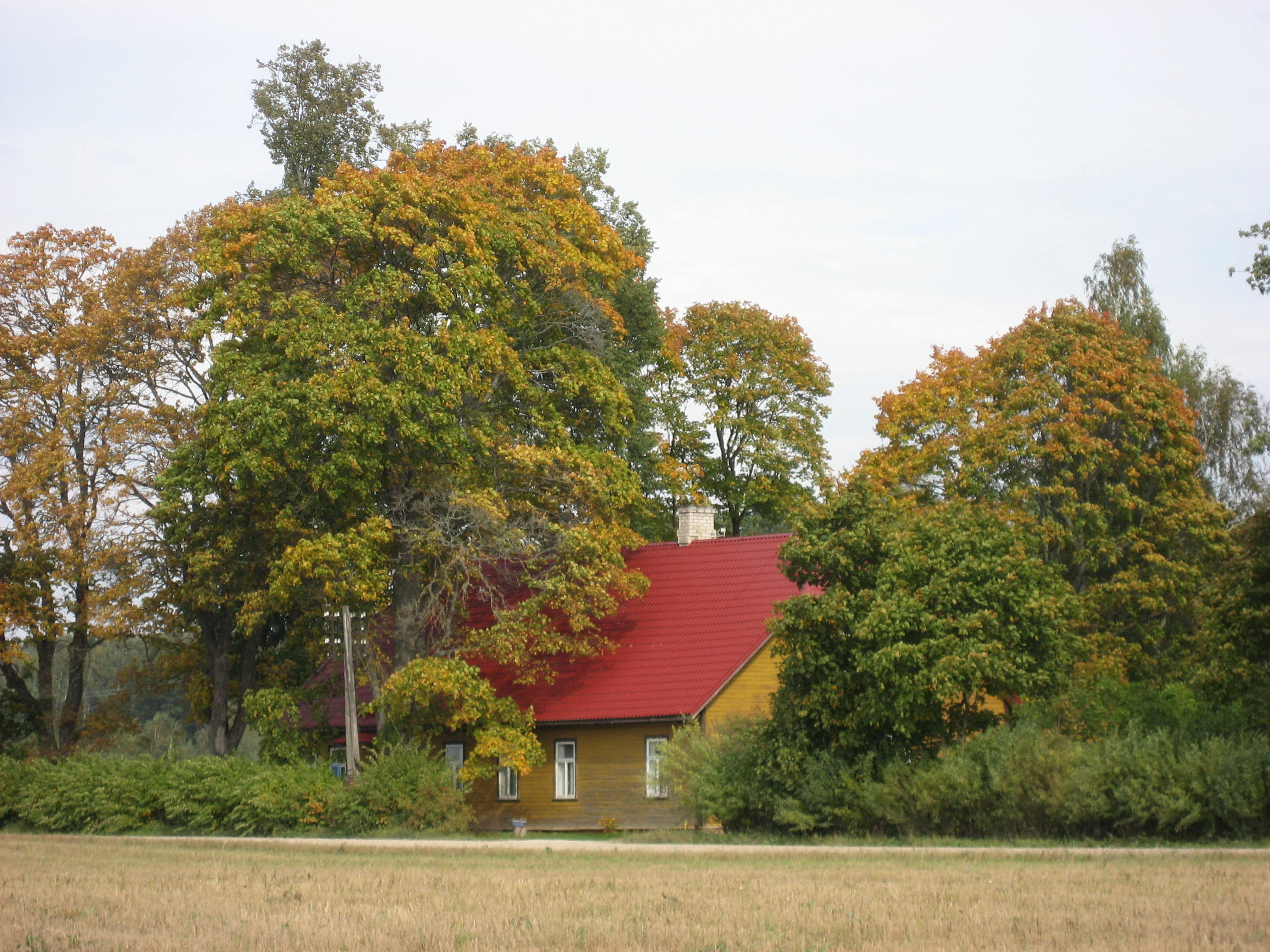
Suurkülä in 2007

Suurküla is a village in Põlva Parish, Põlva County, in southeastern Estonia.

Ridali Airfield (ICAO: EERI) is located in Suurküla.
