= SZD-49 Jantar K =

Polish single-seat glider, 1978

General information
- Type: Glider
- National origin: Poland
- Manufacturer: ZSLS Bielsko
- Designer: Władysław Okarmus
- Status: prototype
- Number built: 1

History
- First flight: 10 October 1978
- Developed from: SZD-48 Jantar Standard 2/3

The SZD-49 Jantar K was a 15m Class glider designed and built in Poland in 1977.

== Development ==
After the FAI Standard class rules had been created and then modified in the early 1970s the FAI decided to add a new 15m class, for gliders with a maximum span of 15m but no other restrictions other than airbrakes limiting the speed to V_{ne} or less. Władysław Okarmus set about designing a new wing, with flaps, for use with the SZD-48-3 fuselage, the resulting offspring was named SZD-49 Jantar K. First flight of the prototype, (SP-2583, X-143), took place at Bielsko in October 1978. All was not well with the SZD-49 during the flight trials and further development was abandoned. The sole prototype was later used as a live teaching aid for advanced students and was successfully modified twice with some success by groups of students from Warsaw University of Technology.

Constructed almost entirely from glassfibre using epoxy resin, the SZD-49 had a welded steel tube centre-section truss to accept the loads from the wings, undercarriage and towing hook. A one-piece forward-opening canopy with integral glare-shield gave access to the cockpit for entry/egress and maintenance. The wings are fitted with full-span flaps with drooping ailerons as well as single-leaf airbrakes extending from top and bottom surfaces of the wing. Ailerons are driven through a patented linkage entirely enclosed inside the wing.

A standard instrument fit and an oxygen system were provided by the manufacturer.

== Specifications (SZD-49 Jantar K) ==
Data from

General characteristics

- Crew: 1
- Length: 6.85 m (22 ft 6 in)
- Wingspan: 15 m (49 ft 2.5 in)
- Height: 1.51 m (4 ft 11 in)
- Wing area: 10.66 m^{2} (114.75 sq ft)
- Aspect ratio: 21.1:1
- Airfoil: NN 8
- Empty weight: 265 kg (584 lb)
- Gross weight: 385 kg (849 lb) without ballast; 535 kg (1,179.5 lb) with ballast

Performance

- Maximum speed: 250 km/h (155 mph, 135 kn)
- g limits: + 5.3 / -2.65
- Maximum glide ratio: 40 @ 97 km/h without ballast, 123 km/h with ballast
- Rate of sink: 0.60 m/s (118 ft/min) at (320kg/75 km/h); 0.69 m/s (136 ft/min) at (420 kg/ 86km/h)

== See also ==
Aircraft of comparable role, configuration, and era

- Glasflügel 303 Mosquito
- Schempp-Hirth Mini-Nimbus
- Schleicher ASW 20

Related lists

- List of gliders
