= SZD-41 Jantar Standard =

SZD-Jantar (Standard Class)
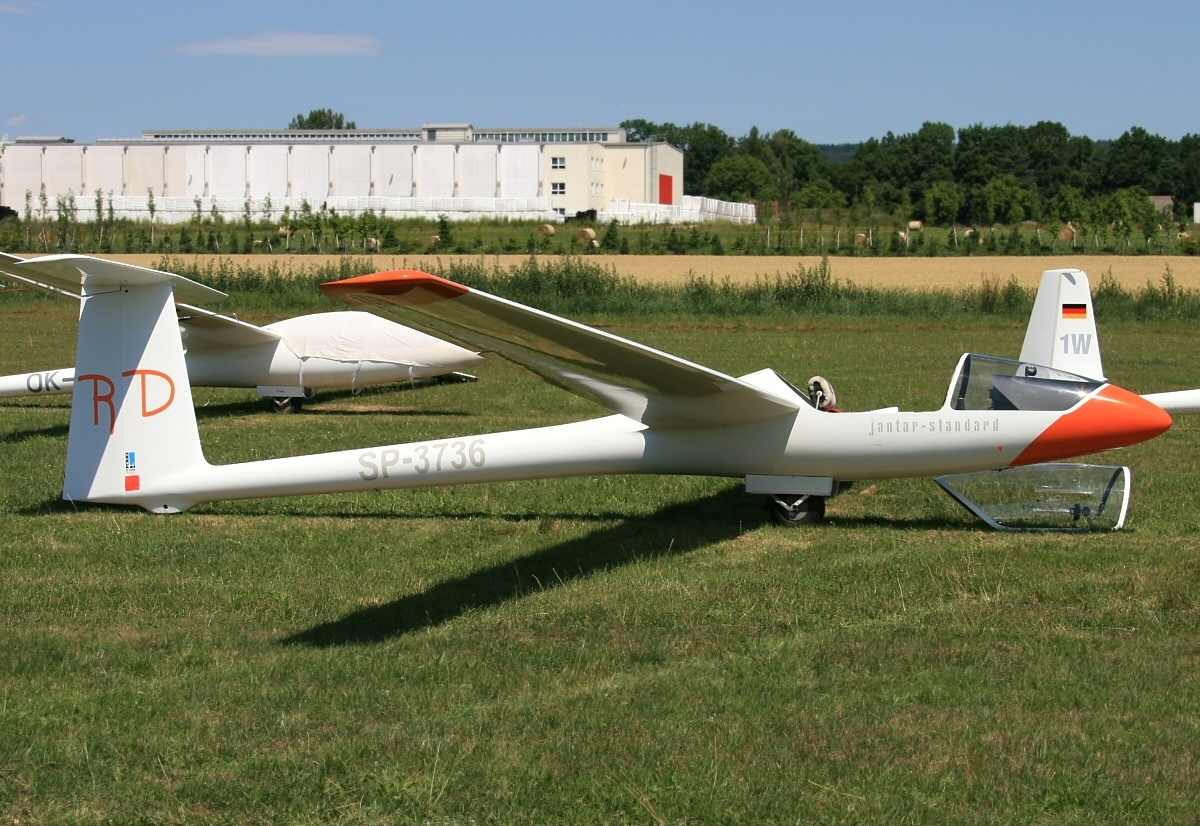

General information
- Type: Glider
- National origin: Poland
- Manufacturer: SZD
- Designer: W. Okarmus
- Number built: 159

History
- First flight: 3 October 1973
- Developed from: SZD-38 Jantar 1
- Variant: SZD-48 Jantar Standard 2/3

The SZD-41 Jantar Standard was a Standard Class glider designed and produced in Poland from 1973.

== Development ==
Development of the SZD-41 Jantar Standard was relatively quick due to using the fuselage and tail unit of the SZD-38 Jantar 1 and fitting 15 m span wings complying with the Standard class specification. The prototype SZD-41, limited to 235 km/h, no winch launching or aerobatics, first flew in October 1973 piloted by Adam Zientek. The two prototypes, SZD-41-1 SP-2685 (construction number X-110) and SZD-41-2 SP-2686 (c/n X-111), were entered in the 1974 World Gliding Championships at Waikerie in Australia, taking 3rd and 7th places in the Standard class. In 1976, at Räyskälä in Finland, SZD-41As took 4th, 6th and 18th places in the World Gliding Championships Standard Class. Competition results and measured flight tests revealed that the SZD-41A was more or less the equal of direct competitors, such as the Schempp-Hirth Standard Cirrus and Schleicher ASW 19. Unfortunately, the production methods left the epoxy laminates prone to shrinkage which drastically affected performance due to the sensitive aerodynamics of the aerofoil sections used.

The SZD-41A Jantar Standard was built primarily of fibreglass–epoxy resin composite with local strengthening from welded steel tube in the fuselage centre-section, foam ribs in the wings and plywood at equipment mounting points. The skin was composed of fibreglass laminates laid up in moulds to attain accurate profiles. The monowheel manually retractable landing gear hung from the steel tube centre section structure which also mounted the towing hook and wing attachments. Large plate style airbrakes aft of the mainspar extend from the top and bottom surfaces, with the gaps sealed by spring-loaded covers when closed, also operating the disk brake on the monowheel at full extension. The cantilever fibreglass–epoxy tailplane is attached to the top of the fin, trimming of the elevator was achieved by spring loading the control stick and adjusting the neutral loading position. 80 litres (later 100) of water ballast could be carried in plastic tanks in the wings and jettisoned as required. The semi-reclining seat is in a comfortable cockpit enclosed by a two-part canopy, the front part fixed and the rear hinged to open rearwards for entry/exit. After modifications to remove restrictions on the prototypes and improvements required after flight testing, production of the SZD-41A and SZD-41B Jantar Standard commenced, continuing until 1978 when 159 had been built, many of which were exported worldwide. In common with many SZD products, the aircraft was delivered with a full range of basic instruments from Polish suppliers, which led to the famous punch-line: "There I was, 50ft, inverted, nothing on the clock but the makers' name, and that was in (expletive redacted) Polish" used in gliding club bars throughout the world to humourise recovery from perilous situations.

== Variants ==
- SZD-41-1 / SZD-41-2 – The two prototypes of the Jantar Standard, produced with handling limitations to ensure that the aircraft were available for the 1974 World Gliding Championships at Waikere in Australia.
- SZD-41A Jantar Standard – The initial production version with limitations removed and other detail improvements.
- SZD-41B Jantar Standard – The final production variant with various detail improvements.

== Specifications (SZD-41A Jantar Standard) ==
Data from http://www.piotrp.de/SZYBOWCE/pszd41.htm

General characteristics

- Crew: 1
- Length: 7.11 m (23 ft 4 in)
- Wingspan: 15 m (49 ft 2.5 in)
- Height: 1.51 m (4 ft 11 in)
- Wing area: 10.66 m^{2} (114.75 sq ft)
- Aspect ratio: 21.1
- Airfoil: NN 8
- Empty weight: 244 kg (538 lb)
- Gross weight: 360 kg (794 lb) with ballast 460 kg (1,014 lb)

Performance

- Maximum speed: 250 km/h (155 mph, 135 kn)
- Stall speed: 80 km/h (50 mph, 43 kn) with ballast; 68 km/h (42.25 mph) without ballast
- g limits:
  without ballast 5.3 / -2.65
  with ballast 4.14 / -2.5
  ultimate 7.95 / -3.98
- Maximum glide ratio: 38 @ 92 km/h (57 mph) no ballast, 38 @ 105.2 km/h (65 mph) with ballast
- Rate of sink: 0.69 m/s (136 ft/min) with ballast; 0.6 m/s (118 ft/min) without ballast

== See also ==
Aircraft of comparable role, configuration, and era

- Glasflügel H-201 Libelle
- Schempp-Hirth Standard Cirrus
- Schleicher ASW 19
- Rolladen-Schneider LS1
