= SZD-42 Jantar 2 =

Single seat Open Class competition glider

Jantar 2
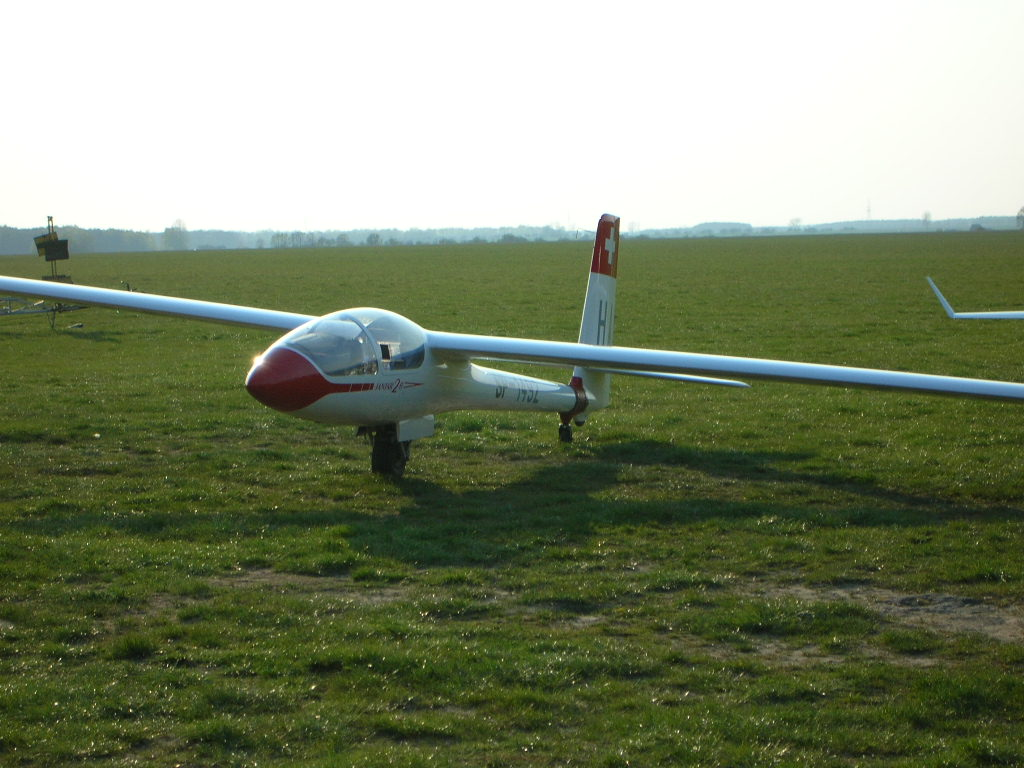
- Jantar 2B

General information
- Type: Single seat Open Class glider
- National origin: Poland
- Manufacturer: Szybowcowy Zakład Doświadczalny (SZD) (Experimental Glider Establishment)
- Designer: Adam Kurbiel
- Number built: 118

History
- First flight: 2 February 1976
- Developed from: SZD-38 Jantar 1

The SZD-42 Jantar 2 is a single seat Open Class competition glider, designed and produced in Poland in the 1970s. It features a span of over 20 m (66 ft) and elastic, camber changing flaps. It was placed second, third and seventh at the 1976 World Gliding Championships. Over one hundred were built and more than ninety remain registered.

== Design and development ==
The Jantar 2 is a development of the SZD-38 Jantar 1 with a span increased by 2.50 m (8 ft 2.5 in) and a cruciform, rather than T-, tail. The latter change was introduced to limit the inertial stress on the fin during ground loops. Both types were designed by Adam Kurbiel. Jantar means amber, the mineral, in Old Polish.

Apart from the greater span, the wing of the Jantar 2 differed only from that of its predecessor by having less taper and a slight change of plan. The leading edge remains straight and slightly swept, but the inner half-span has no sweep on the trailing edge, with the ailerons mounted on the forward swept edge of the outboard part. The wing construction is similar to that of the Jantar 1, all glass fibre with a single spar and glass cloth/foam sandwich skin. There are mid-chord Schempp-Hirth airbrakes which extend both above and below the wing. Its camber changing flaps are hingeless; instead the movement is provided by deflection of the upper wing surface. Combined with a carefully sealed sliding joint in the lower surface, these elastic flaps minimise loss in lift due to leakage and abrupt shape changes. The first two prototypes had two piece wings but later aircraft have further wing divisions at about 2.5 m (8 ft) from the wing tips for easier handling.

The fuselage of the Jantar 2 has a central steel tube section, enclosed within a glass fibre epoxy shell which narrows aft of the wings. Its cockpit is long and roomy, with a two-piece canopy, the rear section of which hinges upwards from behind. The tall, straight tapered and blunt tipped fin is an integral part of the fuselage structure; the straight edged rudder extends down to the keel and operates in a small cut-out in the elevators. The Jantar's straight tapered tailplane is mounted on the fin just above the upper fuselage line. Its main monowheel undercarriage is retractable, as is the tailwheel.

The Jantar 2 made its first flight on 2 February 1976. It was followed in production by the Jantar 2B, which differs chiefly in the position of its wing, raised on the fuselage by 125 mm (4.9 in) from mid-wing to shoulder position and with its angle of incidence reduced by 1.5°, better to align the fuselage and airflow at the attitude assumed in high speed flight. It also has an increase in water ballast capacity. This variant first flew on 13 March 1978.

== Operational history ==
The two prototypes competed at the World Gliding Championships of 1976, held in Finland, with Julian Ziobro finishing in second place and Henryk Muszczynski third. Dick Johnson came seventh in a production aircraft.

80 SZD-42s remained on the civil registers of European countries west of Russia in mid-2010. There are ten on the US register and four on the Australian register.

== Variants ==
Data from Simons

Jantar 2A (SZD-42-1)
Original Jantar 1 development. 25 built.
Jantar 2B (SZD-42-2)
Higher mounted wing set at a lower angle of incidence. Increased water ballast capacity. 93 built.

== Specifications (Jantar 2B / SZD-42-2) ==
Data from Jane's All the World's Aircraft 1988-89

General characteristics

- Crew: One
- Length: 7.18 m (23 ft 7 in)
- Wingspan: 20.5 m (67 ft 3 in)
- Height: 1.76 m (5 ft 9 in)
- Wing area: 14.25 m^{2} (153.4 sq ft)
- Aspect ratio: 29.5
- Airfoil: root:Wortmann FX 67-K-150; tip: Wortmann FX 67-K-170
- Empty weight: 362 kg (798 lb)
- Gross weight: 458 kg (1,010 lb) without ballast
- Max takeoff weight: 649 kg (1,431 lb) with maximum water ballast
- Water ballast: 167 L (44 US gal; 37 imp gal)

Performance

- Stall speed: 80 km/h (49 mph, 43 kn)
- Never exceed speed: 250 km/h (155 mph, 135 kn) in smooth air

200 km/h (110 kn; 120 mph) in rough air
140 km/h (76 kn; 87 mph) on aero-tow
115 km/h (62 kn; 71 mph) on winch launch

- g limits: +5.3/-2.65 without ballast, +4.0/-1.5 fully ballasted
- Rate of sink: 0.46 m/s (91 ft/min) at 80 km/h (43 kn; 50 mph)
- Lift-to-drag: 50.3 maximum at 103 km/h (56 kn; 64 mph)
- Wing loading: 33.4 kg/m^{2} (6.8 lb/sq ft) without ballast

45.6 kg/m^{2} (9.34 lb/sq ft) with maximum ballast
