= Sheikh Badin =

Sheikh Badin is a famous tourist place in mid of Lakki Marwat and Dera Ismail Khan Districts of Pakistan. It is located at the junction of Dera Ismail Khan and Lakki Marwat districts, approximately 25 kilometers towards east on Indus Highway at the town of Pezu. Access to the hill station is difficult due to the poor condition of the unpaved road which is regularly degraded by rainfall during the monsoon period. It has a lot of old monuments.Here live two tribes one of which are mughals and the other are syed.

== History ==
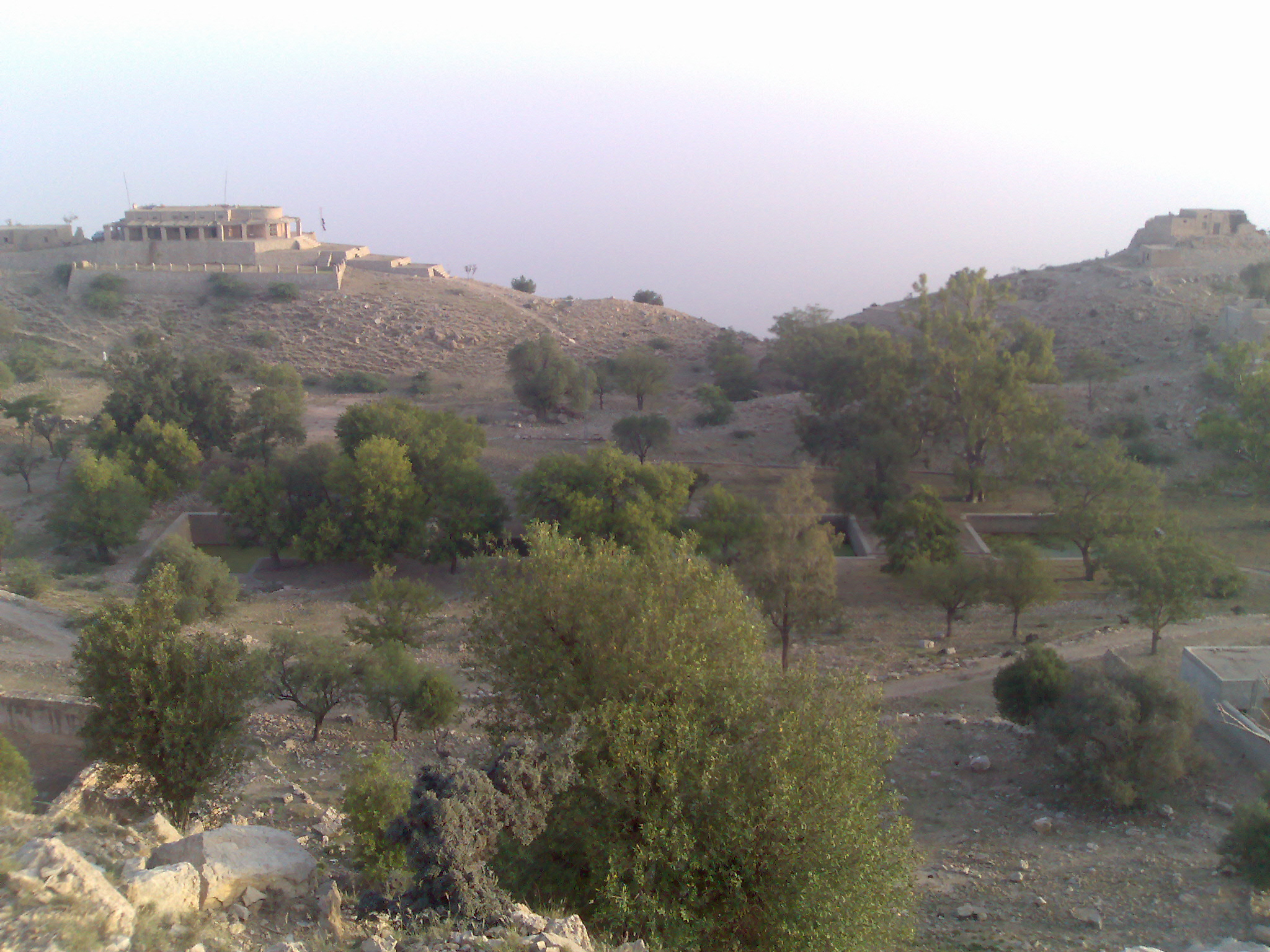
The Post Office Resort in 2015

The name Sheikh Badin originates from name of the sufi saint Sheikh Baha-u-Din Shah, locally famous as Jandō Nekō who is buried at the main cemetery of the village. Traditional folklore describes the famous sufi saint Sheikh Abdul Qadir Gillani came to spend 40 days in recluse at the hill. Jandō Nekō was a descendant of Sufi Saint Sheikh Abdul Qadir Gillani, and came to live here circa 1600 AD in commemoration of his ancestor's recluse on the hill. An annual religious fair, the "Sadra", is held by the devotees of the Syed Tribe in the month of April. Devotees from the nearby districts climb the hill and present gifts to the locals and make recitations and prayers on the graves of the ancient Syeds buried in the village.The second tribe present on the hill are the descendants of mughals which came here after the war of Independence in 1857 and are settled permanently on shiekh badin and nearby villages.The first among mughals to arrive on the hill was the mughal forces general Mirza Imam Baksh Tarbiyat Khan who on the order of Aurangzeb fought the Battle of Torna and Battle of rajgarh successfully conquering the maratha fortress. Mahraja Dilip Singh place a bounty of 80 thousand dirhim on Tarbiyat khans head. He lived on shiekh badin for 87 years and at the time of death his age was 160.Tarbiyat khan is buried in the mughal cemetery where tourists often make visits to view the tomb of Tarbiyat Khan and other descendents which have taken part in the war of Independence against Britain.The tribe is now headed by the descendants of Tarbiyat Khan, one of which is named Bahadur Khan, Mirza Iqbal Azam Engr. Rtd from agricultural department of Pakistan, and have control of the most of area of the hill and observe judgment and decision in so called local jirga because the Law and control agencies are mostly inactive in the area due to harsh climate and absence of the possible way up.

== Climate and population ==
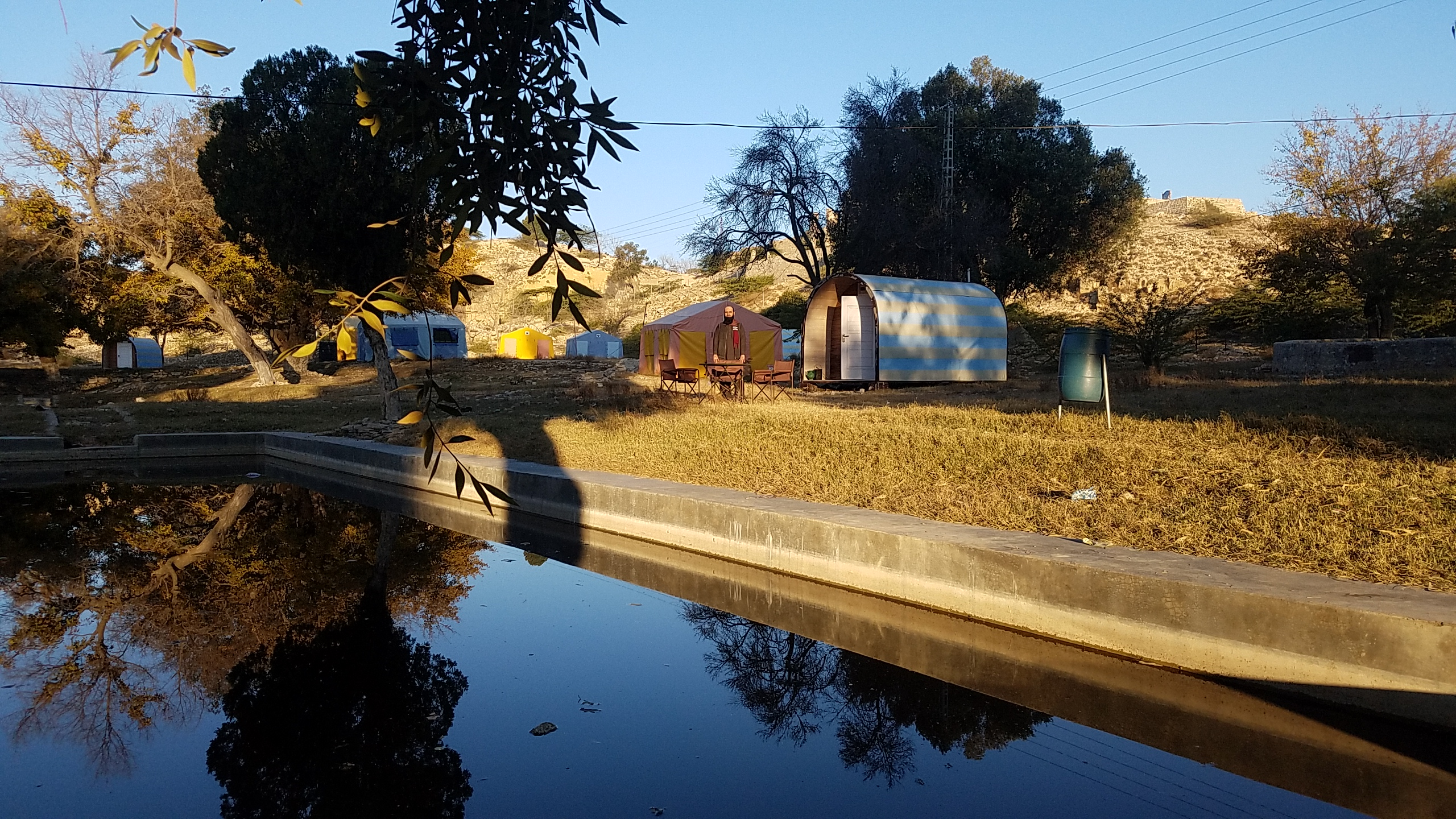
Tourist huts at Sheikh Badin

The hill station is at an average altitude of 1300 meters from sea level. Due to the significant elevation, the climate is less severe compared to surrounding areas and summers are relatively pleasant while winters are harsh and dry. Occasional snowfall is recorded in the months of January and February. The composition of the mountain is mainly rock and minerals which holds little to no water reserves. The village is sustained by rainwater gathered in 7-8 pools, out of which are not always intact and need regular repairs. The population is composed of roughly 50 households, main tribes being Syeds and Sahibs. The main source of income for the villagers is livestock and business. Recently, with the interest of the provincial and federal governments, there has been some efforts to promote tourism and the hill station has been declared a national park to preserve the natural flora and fauna and historical artifacts. Around 10 tourist huts have been constructed at the main village site and electricity provided to the village, although the service is not reliable and power outages are long and unpredictable. Roads are unpaved and mostly dilapidated due to annual rainfall and lack maintenance.

== Monuments ==
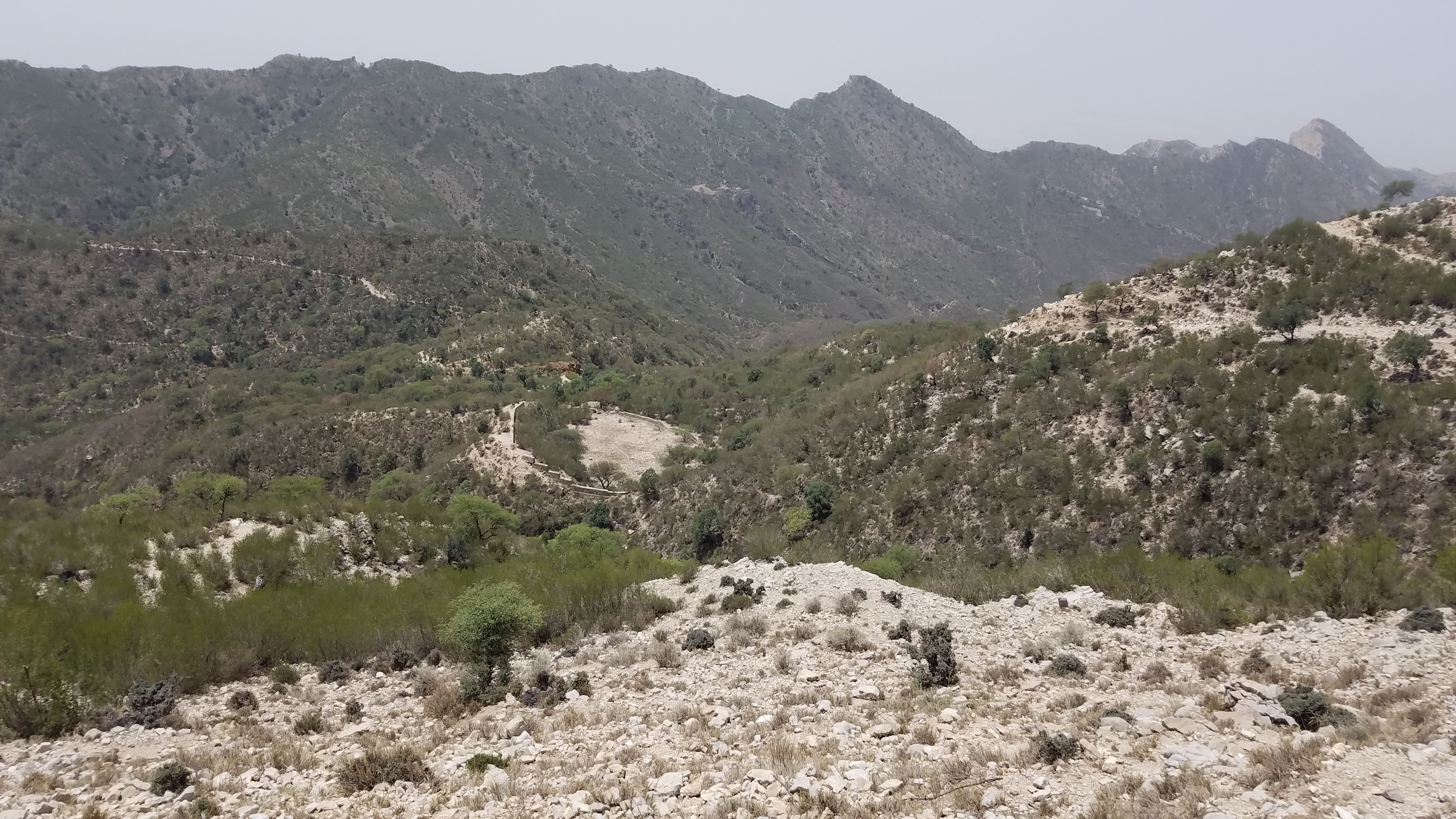
The Christian Cemetery at Sheikh Badin

Most notable of the historical artifacts is the zyarat of Sheikh Abdul Qadir Gillani's recluse at the top of the highest hill in the village. For its milder climate, the hill station was used as a summer station by the British era civil servants and has many artifacts from the British era. These include the ruins of Imperial British administrative offices, a police station and a British cemetery which are partially intact. Other British era artifacts are a tennis court, a squash court, a storage pit and some officer residential houses. A Post Office Resort or Bungalow was constructed in the 1970s with panoramic views of the surrounding plains and villages of Lakki Marwat, but it has degraded to rubble due to lack of maintenance over the past few decades and is no longer functional.

== Restoration ==
Government of Pakistan has decided to restore hill station
