= Darra Pezu =

Coordinates: 32°19′22″N 70°44′4″E

- Union council and town. = Jovan
- Interactive map of Darra Pezu
- Country: Pakistan
- Province: Khyber Pakhtunkhwa
- District: Lakki Marwat District
- Time zone: UTC+5 (PST)

Darra Pezu is a town and union council of Lakki Marwat District in Khyber Pakhtunkhwa province of Pakistan. It is located at 32°19'22N 70°44'4E.

Darra Pezu is home to Sheikh Badin, a famous hill station and tourist resort. The Sheikh Badin National Park is also located here.
