= SZD-48 Jantar Standard 2/3 =

Polish single-seat glider, 1977

SZD-48 Jantar Standard 2
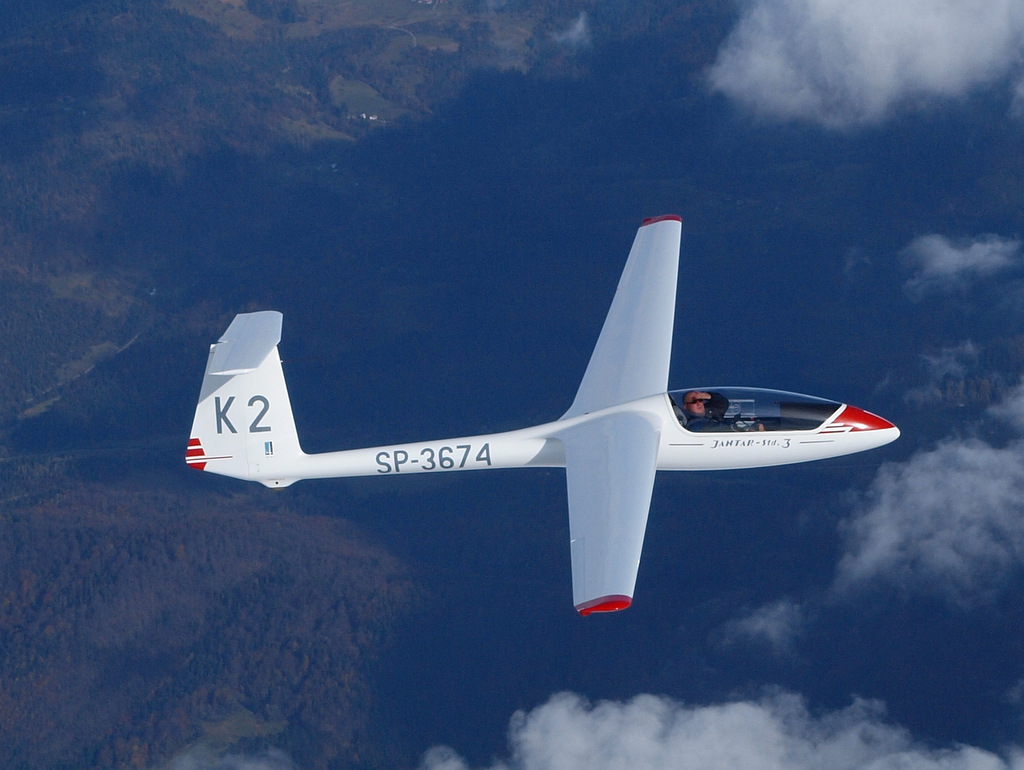
- SZD-48-3 Jantar Standard 3

General information
- Type: Glider
- National origin: Poland
- Manufacturer: PZL-Bielsko
- Designer: Władysław Okarmus
- Number built: Jantar Standard variants: 44 x SZD-48; 285 x SZD-48-1; 348 xSZD-48-3

History
- First flight: Jantar Standard variants: SZD-48 – 10 December 1977; SZD-48-1 – 18 September 1978; SZD-48-3 – 15 April 1982
- Developed from: SZD-41 Jantar Standard
- Variant: SZD-49 Jantar K

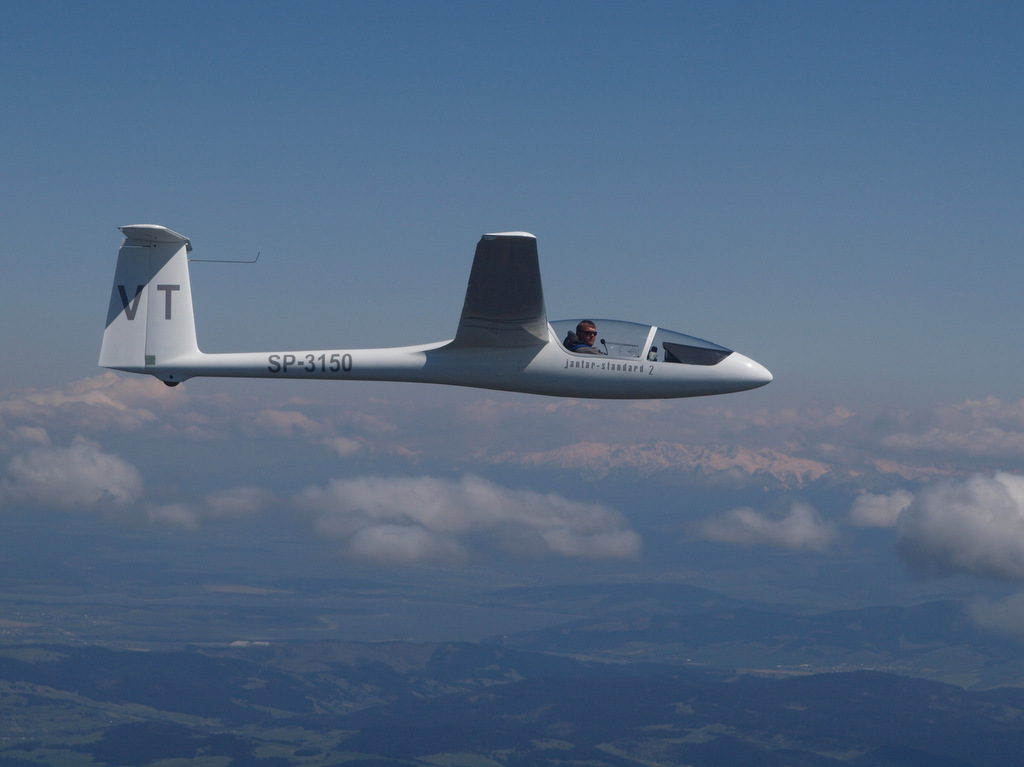
SZD-48 or SZD-48-1 Jantar Standard 2

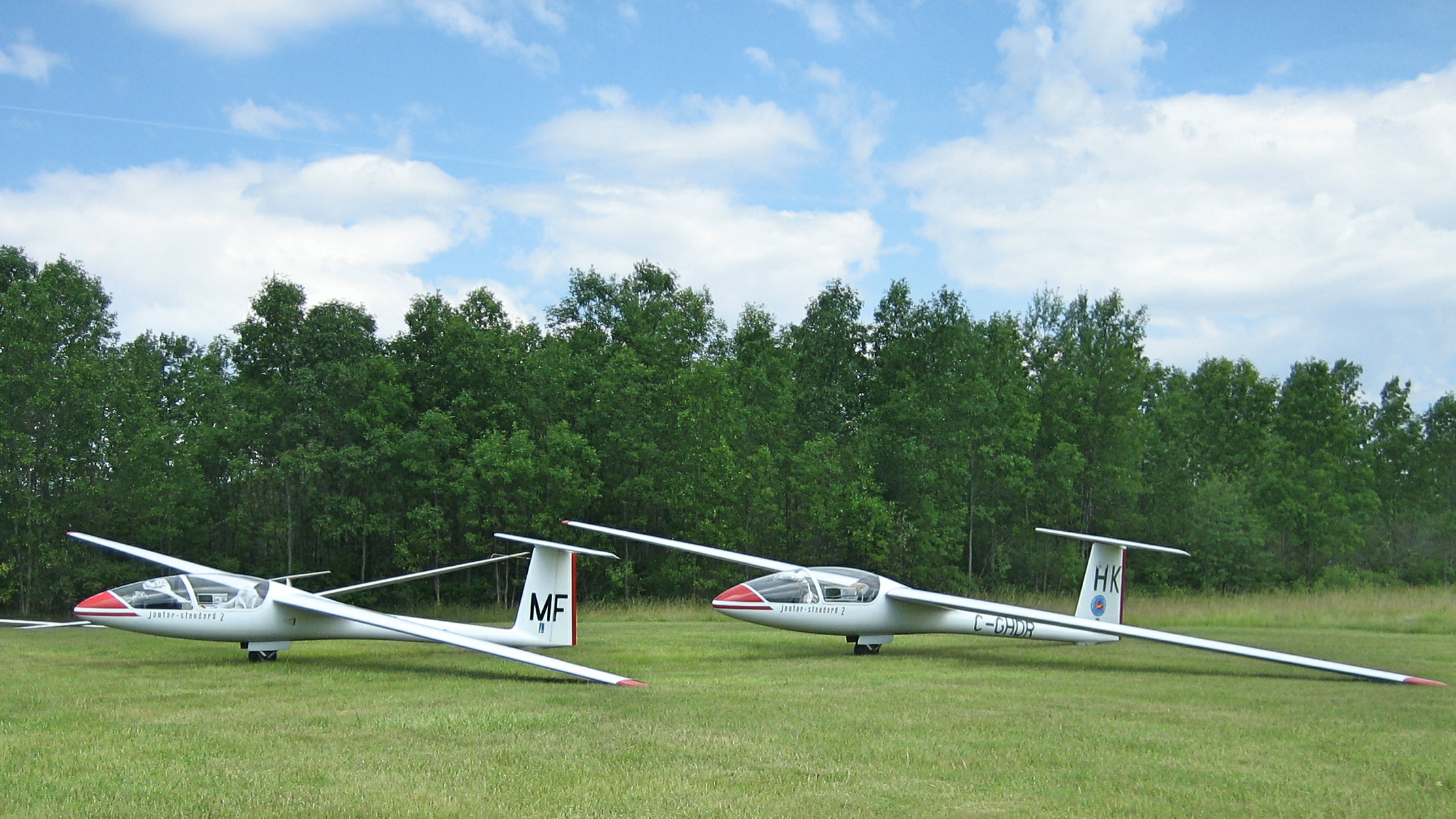
SZD-48(MF) and SZD-48-1(HK) at SOSA Gliding Club, Rockton Airport

External image
- SZD-48-3 Jantar Standard III approaching to land

The SZD-48 Jantar Standard 2 is a Standard Class glider that was designed and produced in Poland starting in 1977.

== Development ==
Unable to introduce desired improvements to the SZD-41 Jantar Standard, SZD, under Władysław Okarmus' guidance, developed the SZD-48 Jantar Standard 2. Using the SZD-41B Jantar Standard as a basis, the SZD-48 utilized the same wings mounted higher on a new fuselage and incorporated several detail refinements, such as an increase of water ballast capacity from 100 litres to 150 litres. Production of the initial production version the SZD-48 Jantar Standard followed the first flight piloted by January Roman totalling 44. Soon superseded by the SZD-48-1 Jantar Standard 2 with small refinements including replacing the ventilation flaps with a single flap on the underside in front of the launch hook. First flight of the SZD-48-1 took place at Bielsko on 18 September 1978 again flown by January Roman, production of 285 SZD-48-1s followed.

The next development of the SZD-48 involved a new forward fuselage with forward opening single piece canopy, which simplified production as well as improving access to the instrument panel and rudder controls, a rudder with increased area and revised water ballast system with individual vent/jettison valves for each wing tank and special funnel for filling. This version entered production as the SZD-48-3 Jantar Standard 3.

The Jantar Standard 2s and 3s are of all glassfibre/epoxy resin construction with frames and ribs and a centre-section truss, built up from welded steel tubes, to support the wings, single wheel retractable undercarriage and the towing hook. The trapezoidal wings have double boom main spar transferred loads from the fibreglass skins, supported by ribs to the centre section truss. Aluminium plate style airbrakes extend from upper and lower surfaces, with gaps sealed by spring-loaded caps when closed. Water ballast tanks for 150 litres are carried in the wing roots with fill and jettison valves, in the fuselage for early versions, in the wings for later aircraft.

The cockpit of the Jantar Standard 2 is covered by a two-piece plexiglass canopy with fixed forward portion and rearward hinged rear portion, with instruments carried on a panel in the central pedestal between the pilots legs. Access to the forward fuselage and entry egress were much improved in the SZD-48-3 by the single piece full length canopy opening forwards complete with the glare shield covering the instruments.

The manually retractable main undercarriage is composed of a single 350 x 135mm diameter wheel retracting backwards into the wheel well, which is closed off by doors operated by the undercarriage legs, and a fixed 200 X 50mm tail-wheel.

Competition success for the Jantar Standard 2 and 3 was elusive, due in part to political problems over Polish attitudes to South Africa, which led to withdrawal of Polish gliding teams from World Gliding Championships. Despite the political pressure and missing out on the showcase provided by international competition, production of the SZD-48 variants was very respectable with exports worldwide

== Variants ==
SZD-48 Jantar Standard 2
Initial production version, 44 built.
SZD-48-1 Jantar Standard 2
Minor improvements over the SZD-48, 285 built.
SZD-48-3 Jantar Standard 3
Improved version, featuring slightly larger rudder and a new forward fuselage with one piece, forward opening canopy, 348 built.

== Specifications (SZD-48-1 Jantar Standard 2) ==
Data from SZD-48-1 Flight Manual

General characteristics

- Crew: 1
- Length: 6.71 m (22 ft 0 in)
- Wingspan: 15 m (49 ft 3 in)
- Height: 1.51 m (4 ft 11 in)
- Wing area: 10.66 m^{2} (114.7 sq ft)
- Aspect ratio: 21.1
- Airfoil: NN-8
- Empty weight: 271 kg (597 lb)
- Gross weight: 385 kg (849 lb) without ballast
- Max takeoff weight: 385 kg (849 lb) without ballast, 535kg with ballast
- Water ballast: 150 L (40 US gal; 33 imp gal)

Performance

- Stall speed: 68 km/h (42 mph, 37 kn) light pilot, 82/51/44 heavy pilot
- Never exceed speed: 285 km/h (177 mph, 154 kn) in smooth air
- Max rough air speed: 200 km/h (110 kn; 120 mph)
- Max aero-tow speed: 150 km/h (81 kn; 93 mph)
- Max winch-launch speed: 125 km/h (67 kn; 78 mph)
- g limits: +5.3 -2.65
- Maximum glide ratio: 40
- Best glide speed: 95 km/h (51 kn; 59 mph) without ballast
- Best glide speed: 123 km/h (66 kn; 76 mph) with ballast
- Rate of sink: 0.77 m/s (151 ft/min) with ballast
- Minimum sink speed: 75 km/h (40 kn; 47 mph) without ballast
- Minimum sink speed: 97 km/h (52 kn; 60 mph) with ballast
- Wing loading: 50.7 kg/m^{2} (10.4 lb/sq ft)

== Specifications (SZD-48-3 Jantar Standard 3) ==
Data from Jane's All the World's Aircraft 1988–89

General characteristics

- Crew: 1
- Length: 6.85 m (22 ft 6 in)
- Wingspan: 15 m (49 ft 3 in)
- Height: 1.51 m (4 ft 11 in)
- Wing area: 10.66 m^{2} (114.7 sq ft)
- Aspect ratio: 21
- Airfoil: NN-8
- Empty weight: 274 kg (604 lb)
- Gross weight: 390 kg (860 lb) without ballast
- Max takeoff weight: 540 kg (1,190 lb)
- Water ballast: 150 L (40 US gal; 33 imp gal)

Performance

- Stall speed: 82 km/h (51 mph, 44 kn)
- Never exceed speed: 285 km/h (177 mph, 154 kn) in smooth air
- Max rough air speed: 200 km/h (110 kn; 120 mph)
- Max aero-tow speed: 150 km/h (81 kn; 93 mph)
- Max winch-launch speed: 125 km/h (67 kn; 78 mph)
- g limits: +5.3 -2.65
- Maximum glide ratio: 40
- Best glide speed: 97 km/h (52 kn; 60 mph) without ballast
- Best glide speed: 123 km/h (66 kn; 76 mph) with ballast
- Rate of sink: 0.77 m/s (152 ft/min) *Minimum sink speed: 97 km/h (52 kn; 60 mph) with ballast
- Wing loading: 50.7 kg/m^{2} (10.4 lb/sq ft)

== See also ==
Aircraft of comparable role, configuration, and era

- Rolladen-Schneider LS4
- Schempp-Hirth Standard Cirrus
