= Dawlatabad District =

Dawlatabad دولت‌آباد Dāulātābad
- District
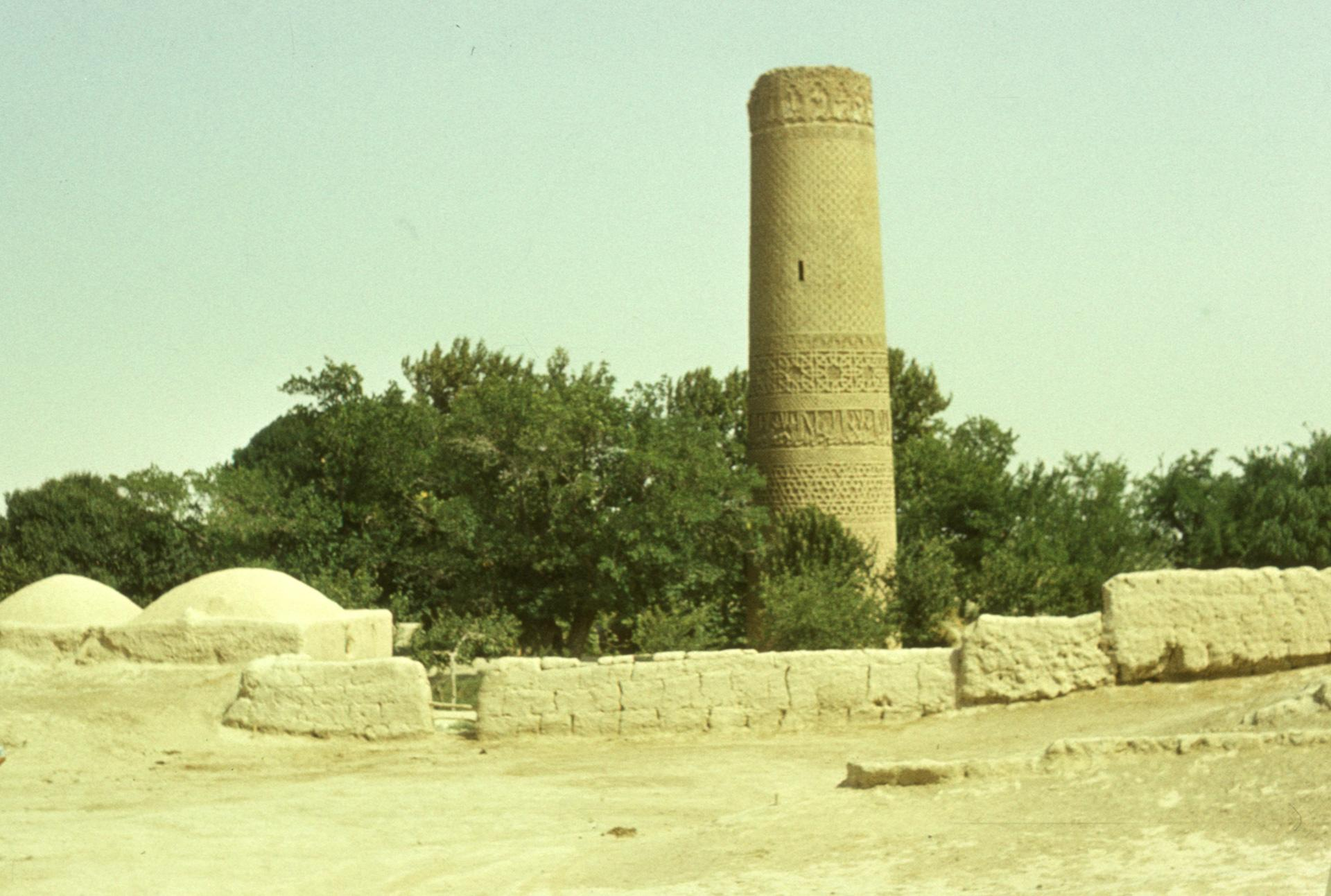
- Zadian Minaret, Zadian in 1976

- Location within Afghanistan
- Coordinates: 37°03′36″N 66°48′00″E
- Country: Afghanistan
- Province: Balkh
- Seat: Dowlatabad
- Elevation: 300 m (980 ft)

Population (2012)
  - Total: 101,900
- Time zone: UTC+04:30 (Afghanistan Time)

Dawlatabad District (Dari: دولت‌آباد) is a landlocked district, located in the northwestern part of Balkh province, in northern Afghanistan. The population is 101,900 people. The capital is the village of Dowlatabad (Pop: 12,400) at 298 m height above sea level.

Major ethnic groups in this district are Uzbek, Turkmen, Tajik, Hazara, Pashtun, and Arab.

== History ==
In the 12th century, the region was missed by Genghis Khan and the invading Mongols.

Archaeology has taken place in the district, including works by the French Archaeological Delegation in Afghanistan (DAFA).

On 14 March 2020, the Ministry of Public Health announced that the district had its first positive case of coronavirus disease in Balkh province, during the 2019-COVID-19 pandemic and outbreak in Afghanistan. The 23-year-old patient had fled Bo Ali Sina Hospital after testing positive.

== Landmarks ==
The Zadian Minaret, a sun-baked clay minaret built by the Seljuks in the 12th century, is located in Zadian village. There is also a central market in Dowlatabad.

== Places ==
The district consists of 52 villages located around the center of the district.

- Dilberjin
- Dowlatabad
- Kheyrabad
- Qarchi Gak
- Qowl Taq
- Zadian

== Gallery ==
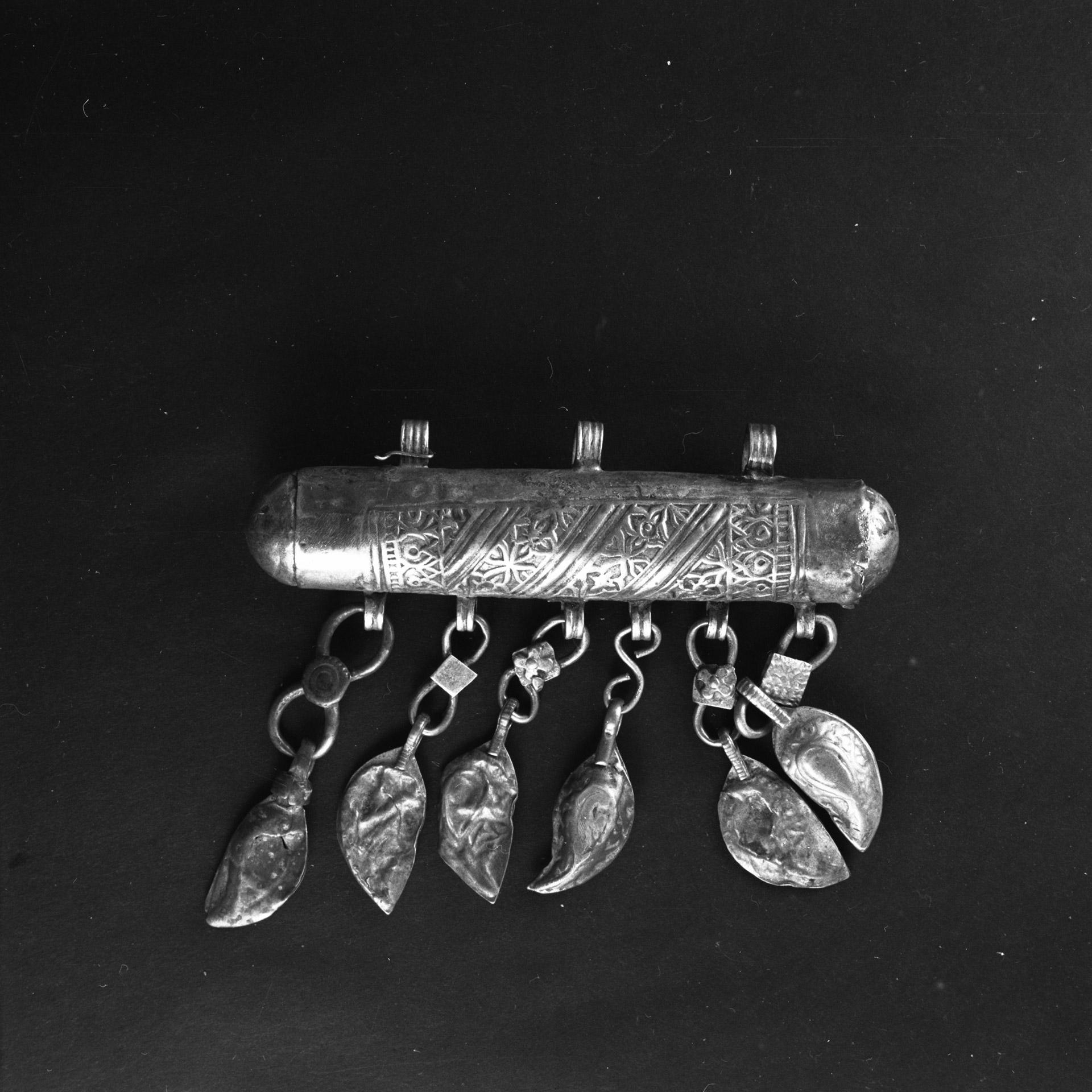
Uzbek "Timur" amulet made of copper

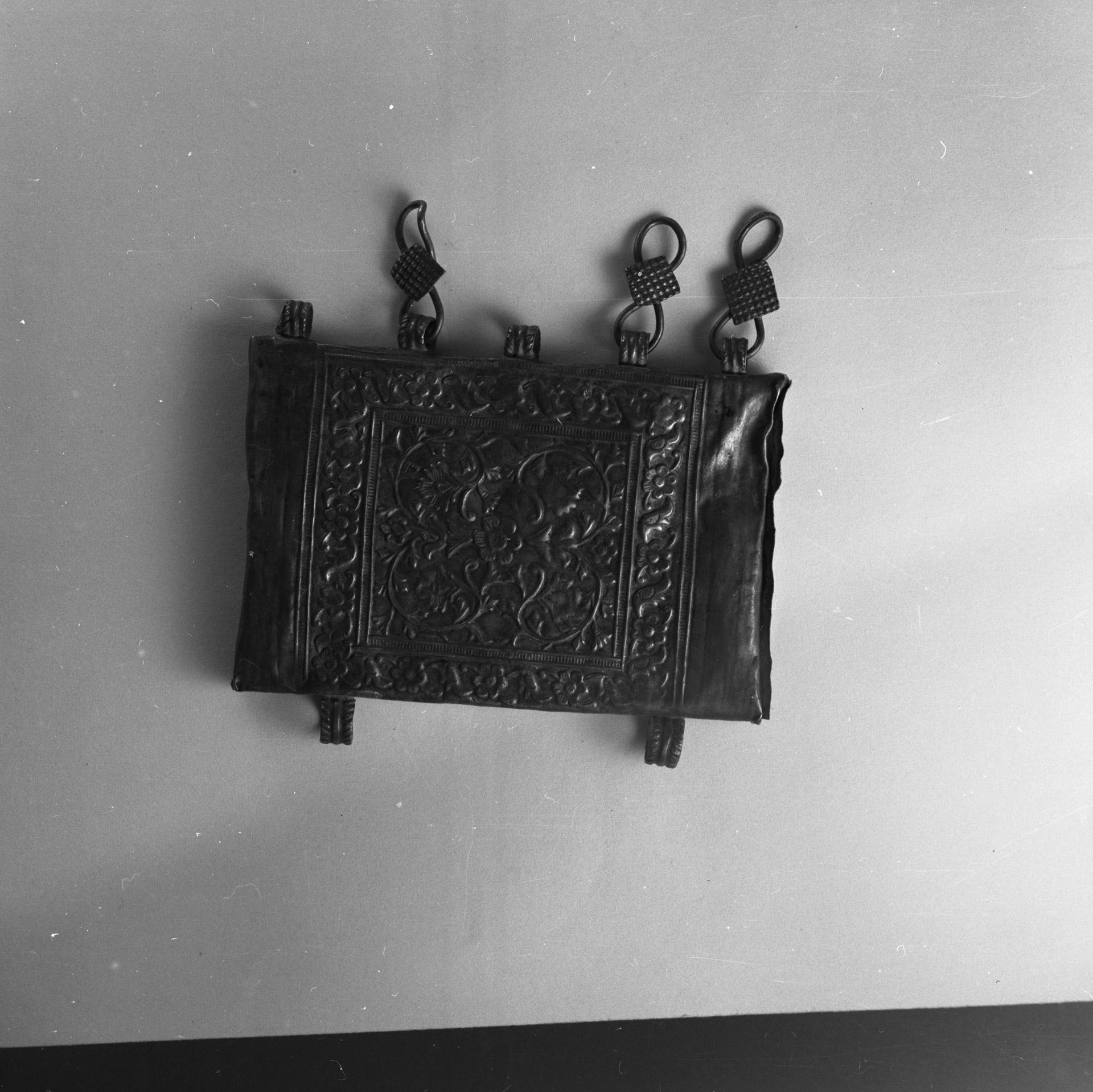
Case for the amulet

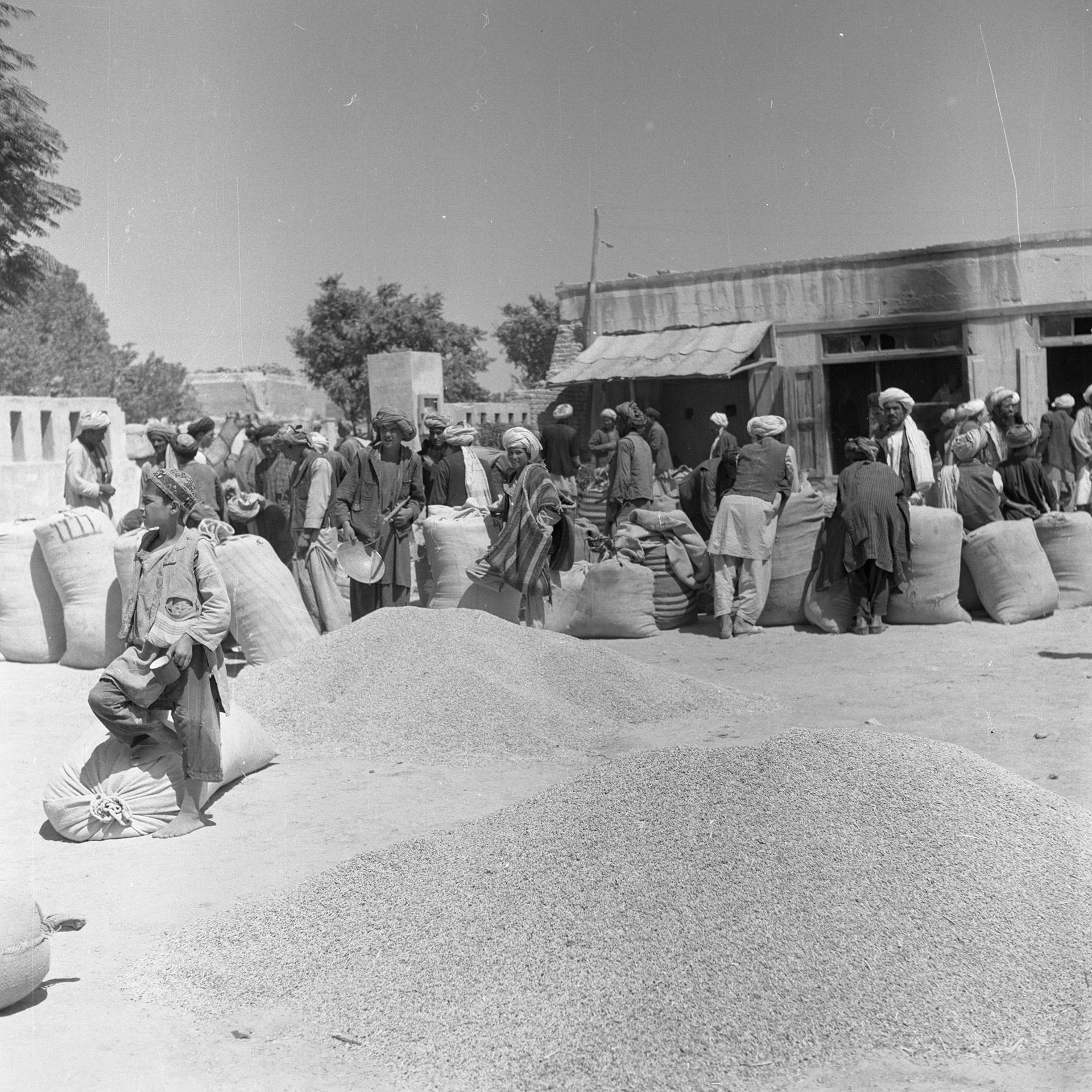
Grain bazaar pictured in 1976

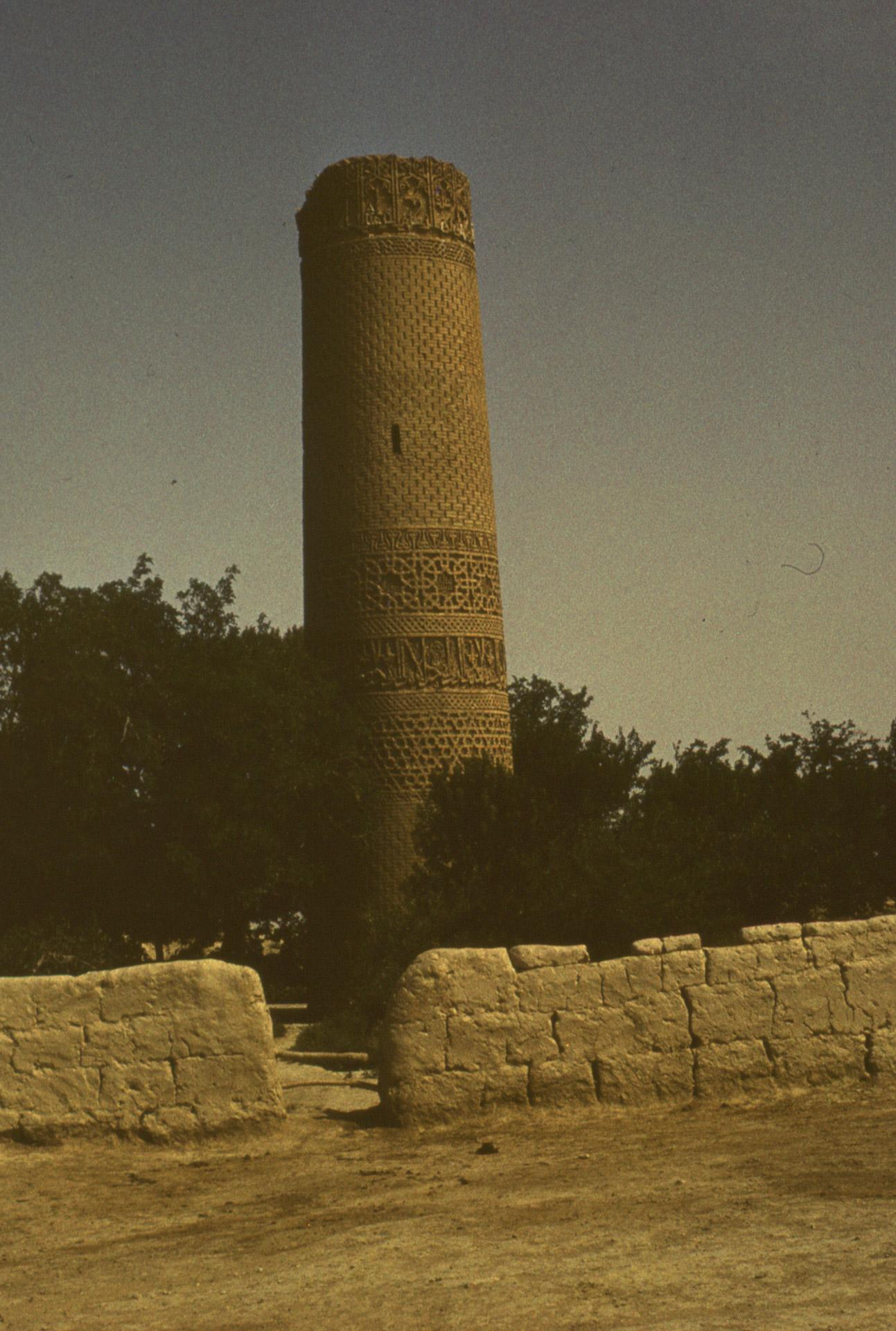
Zadian Minaret in 1976
