= Dowlatabad, Balkh =

Dowlatabad
- Village
- Location in Afghanistan
- Coordinates: 36°59′24″N 66°49′20″E
- Country: Afghanistan
- Province: Balkh Province
- District: Dawlatabad District
- Time zone: UTC+04:30 (Afghanistan Time)

Dowlatabad (Dari: دولت‌آباد) is a town in Balkh Province of Afghanistan. It serves as the capital of Dawlatabad District.

The town is located in Dawlatabad, a landlocked district in northwestern Balkh province, in northern Afghanistan. The district consists of 52 villages located around the center of the district. Major ethnic groups in this district are Uzbek, Turkmen, Tajik, Hazara, Pashtun, and Arab.

== See also ==
- Dawlatabad District
