= Zadian =

Zadian زادیان
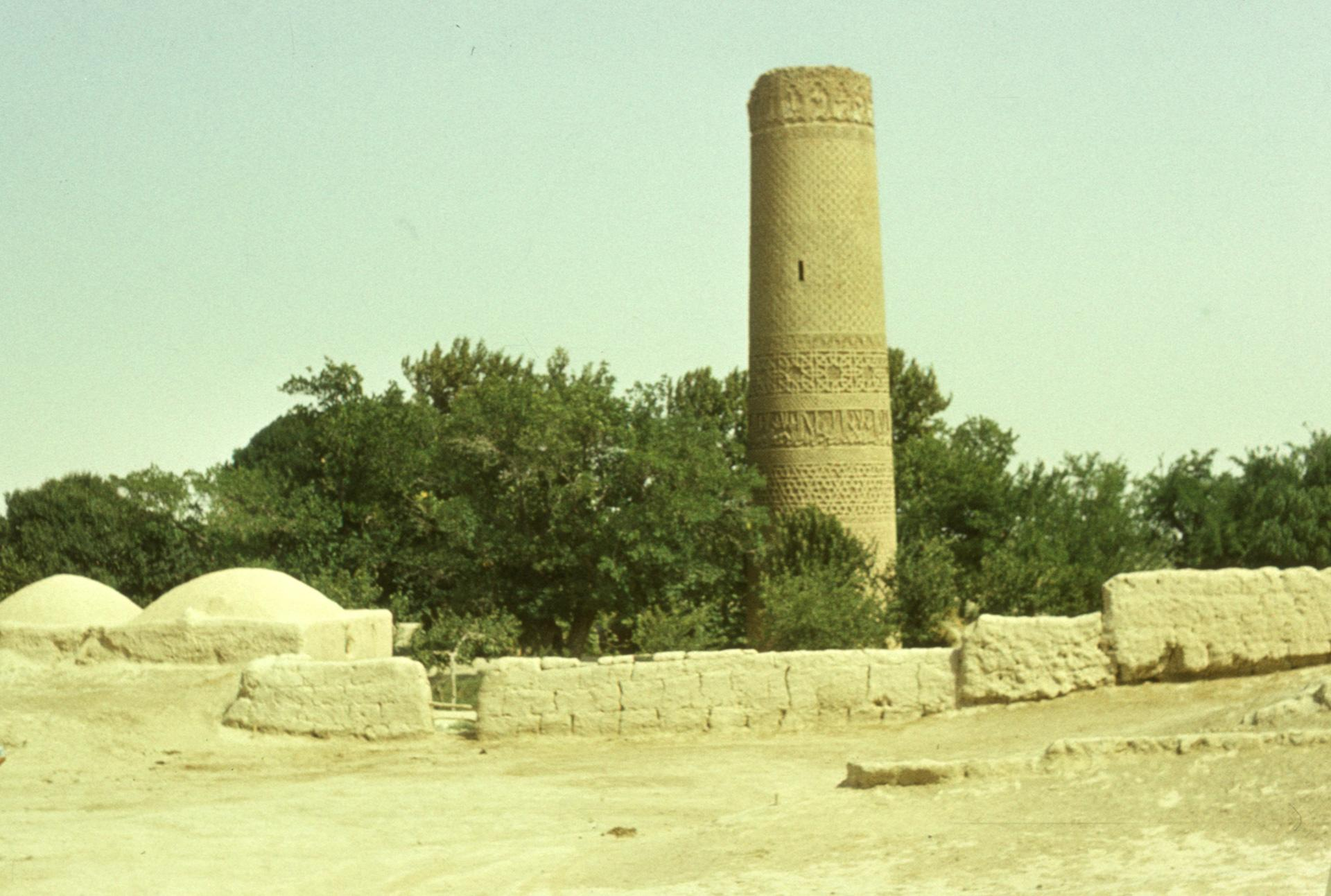
- Zadian Minaret

- Location in Afghanistan
- Coordinates: 37°1′29″N 66°56′37″E
- Country: Afghanistan
- Province: Balkh Province
- Time zone: UTC+04:30
  - Summer (DST): Afghanistan Time

Zadian (Pashto/Persian: زادیان) is a village in Dawlatabad District, Balkh Province in northern Afghanistan.

== History ==
The Zadian Minaret (named after the village) was built by the Seljuk dynasty, during the 12th century. According to the Archaeological Gazetteer of Afghanistan, the minaret was built in 1108–09. However, some archaeological studies suggest that the date of the construction of the minaret is approximately around the year 760. As the minaret is climbable, local citizens have scaled the tower and some have fallen to their deaths in attempts. Near the minaret is the Shrine of Hazrat Saleh, which is an Islamic pilgrim site.

In the 12th century, the village was missed by Genghis Khan and the invading Mongols.

Archaeology has taken place in the village, including works by the French Archaeological Delegation in Afghanistan (DAFA).

== Gallery ==
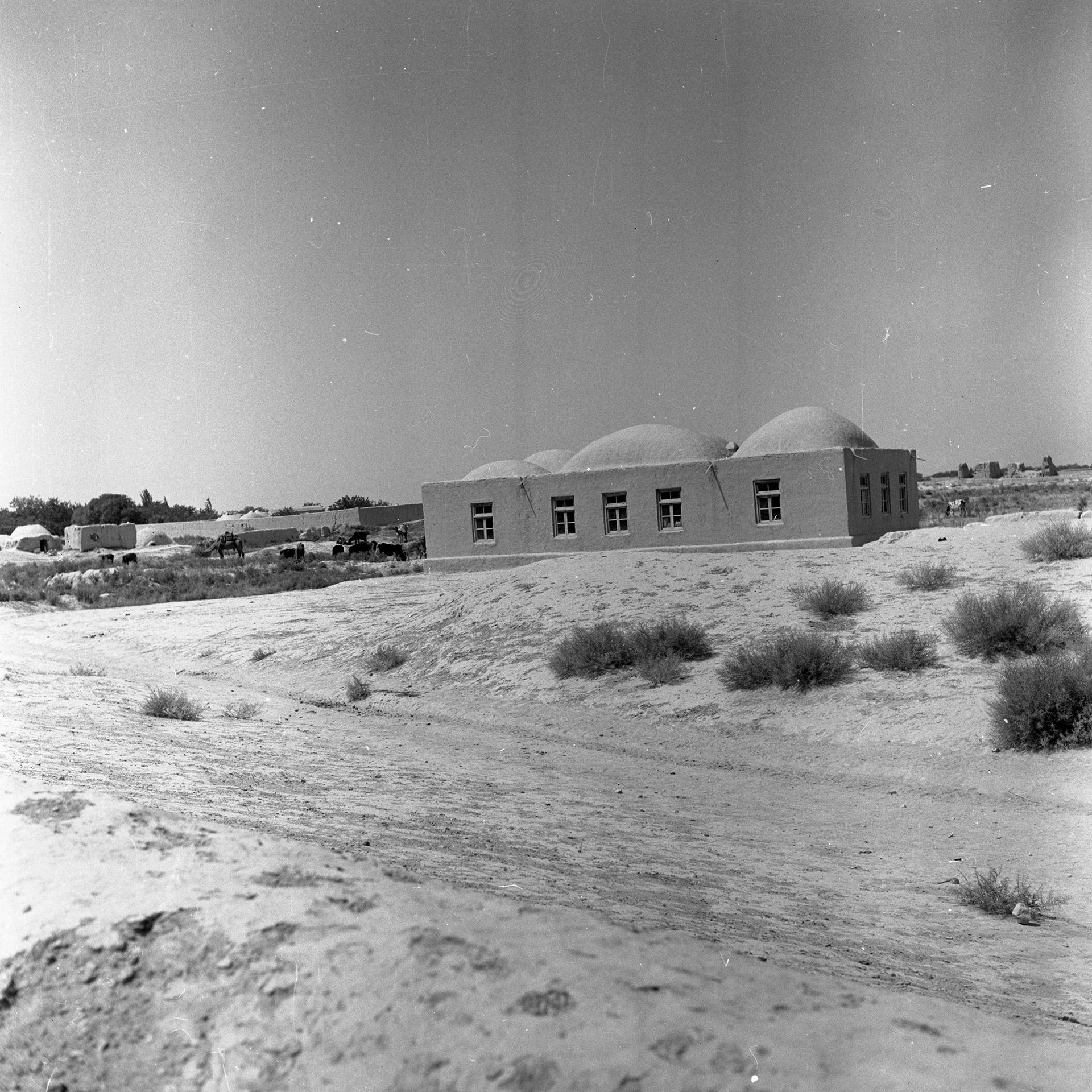
School in Zadian

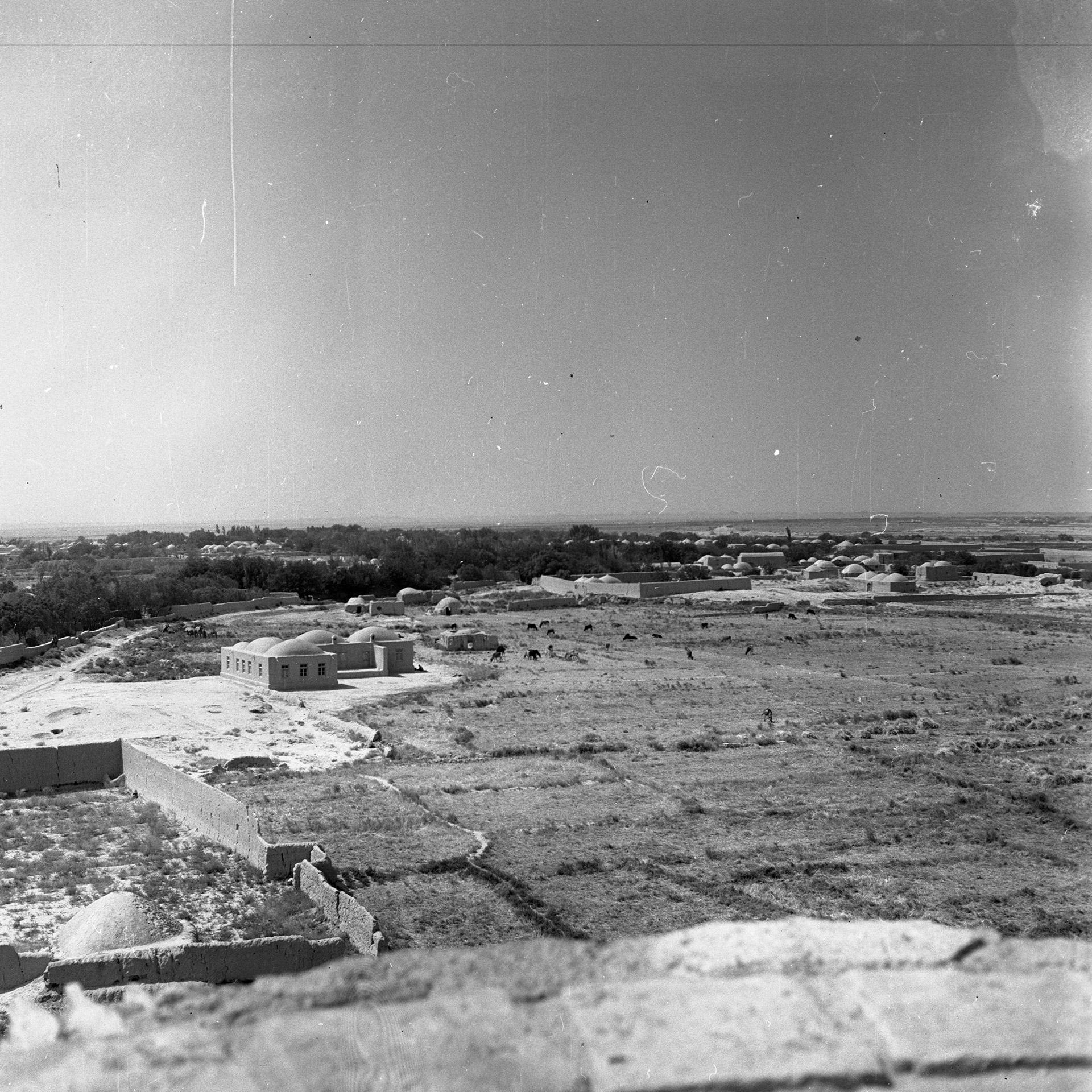
Skyline of Zadian in 1976

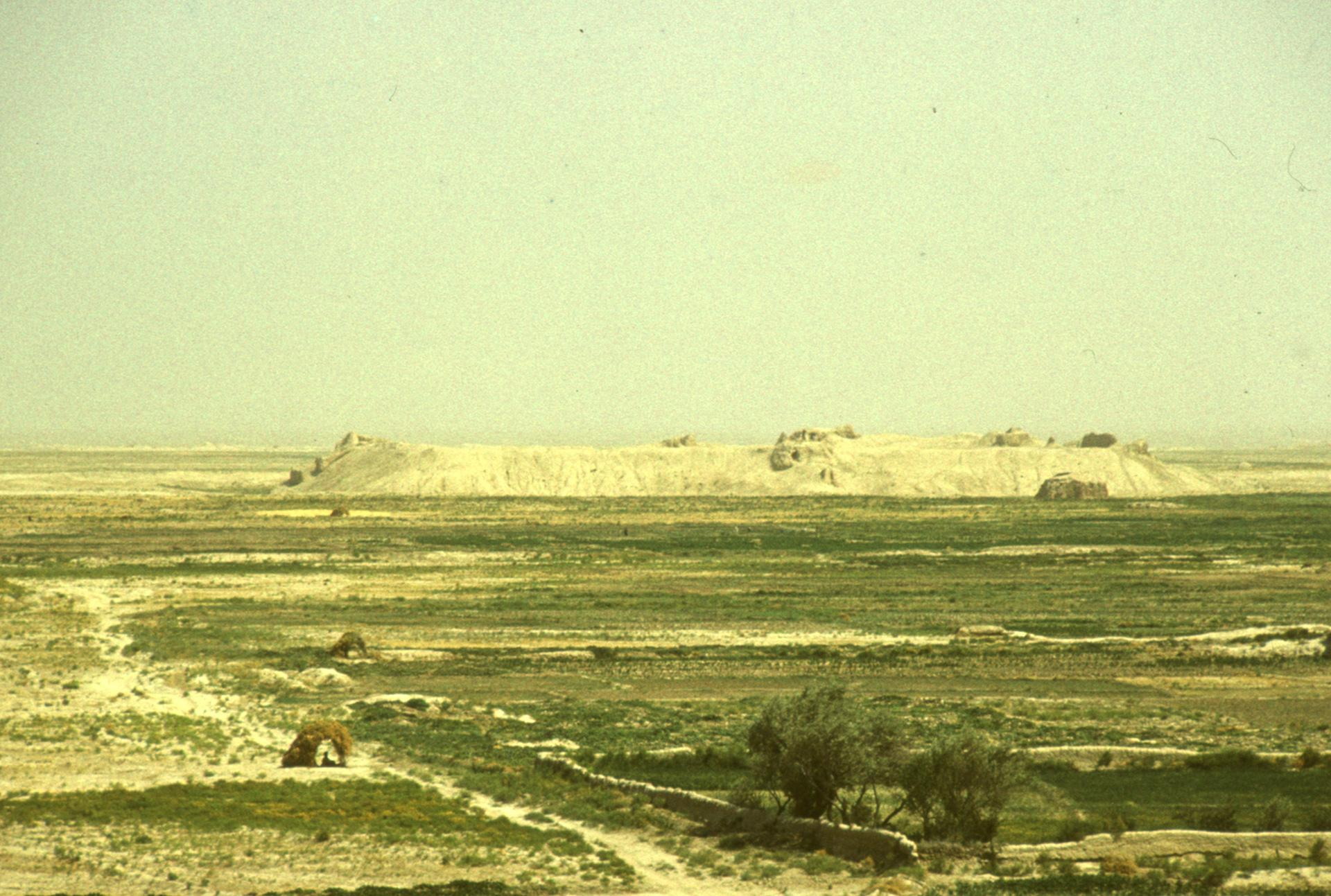
View from the minaret in 1976

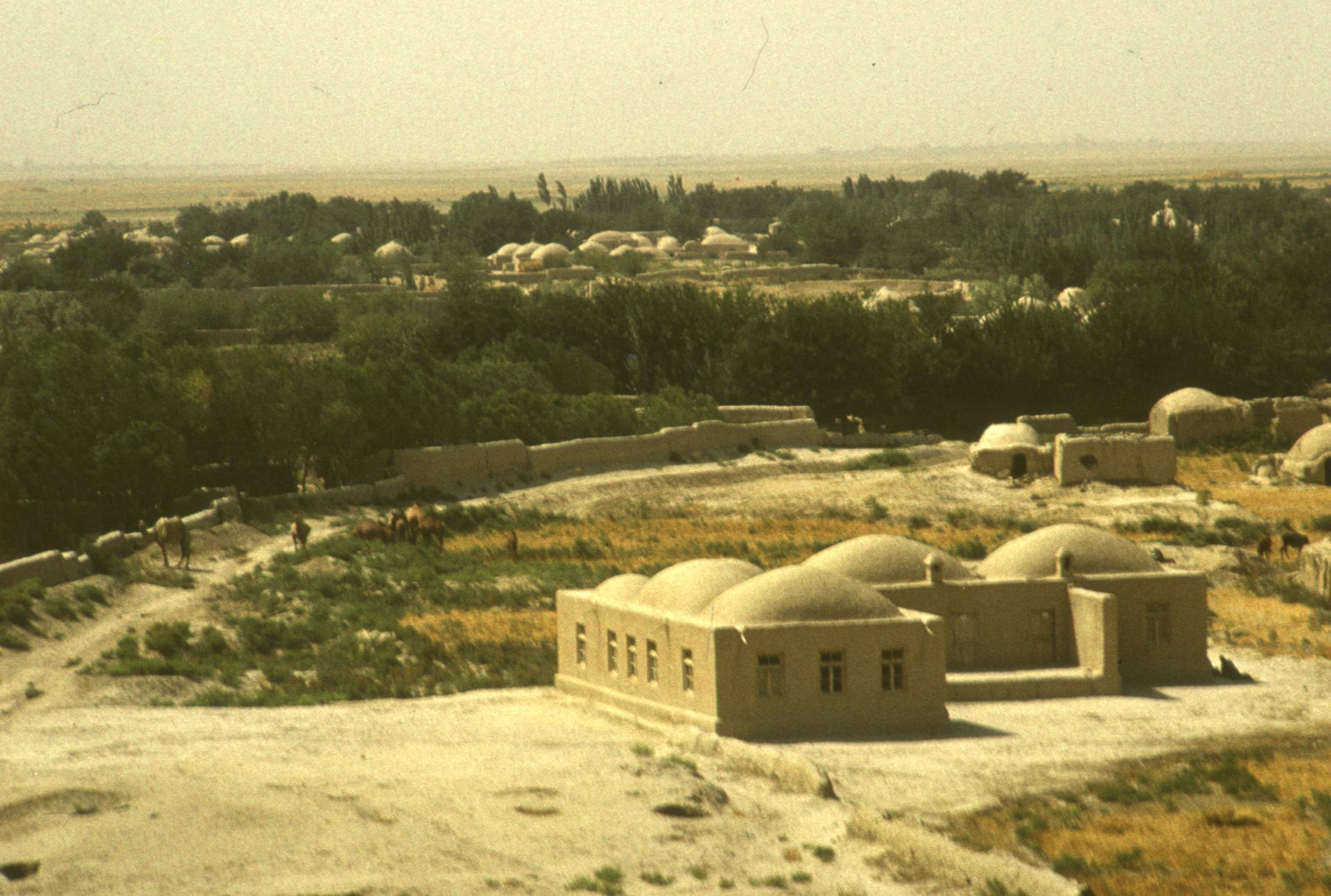
Skyline of Zadian

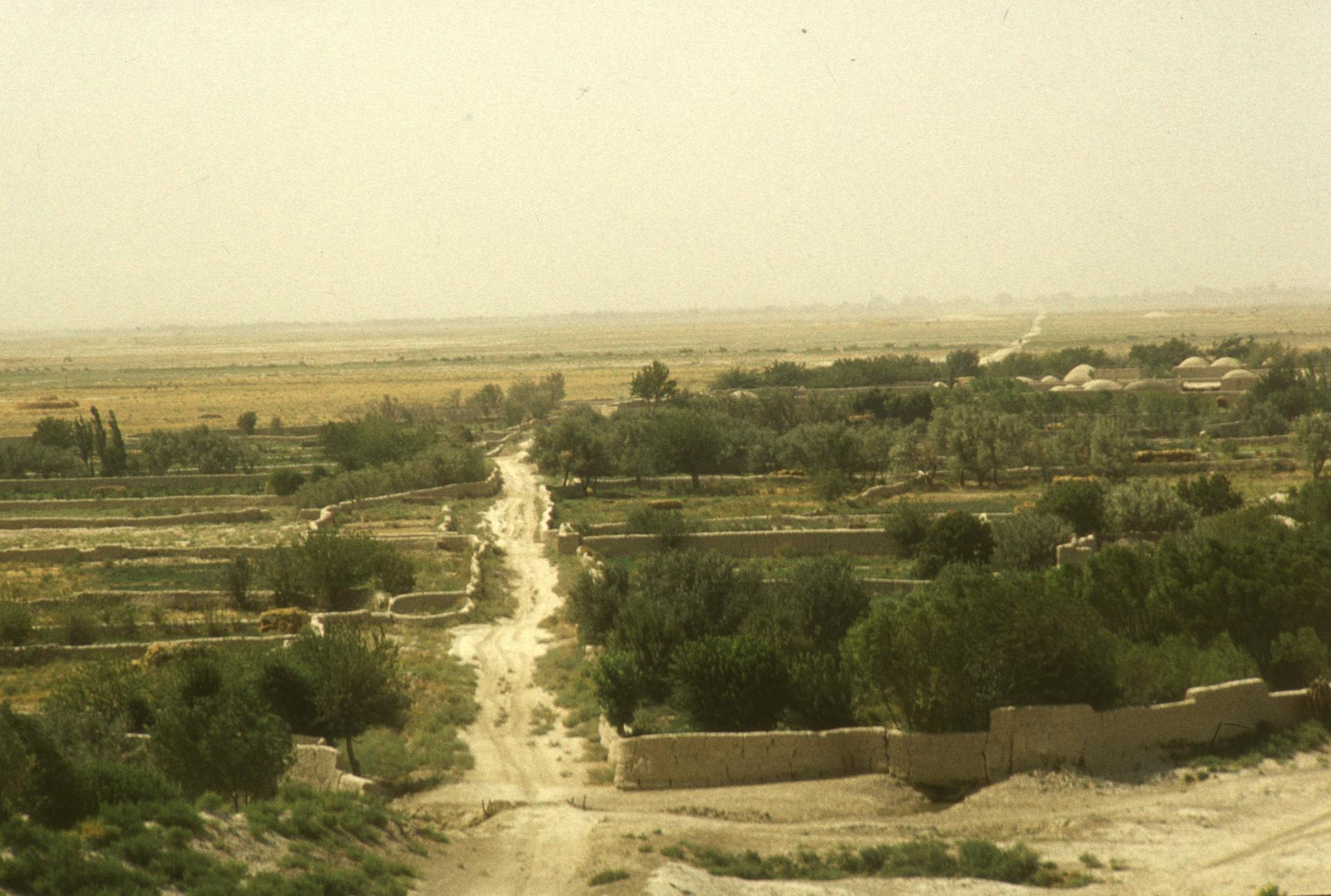
Zadian village
