= Zadian Minaret =

Minaret in Balkh, Afghanistan

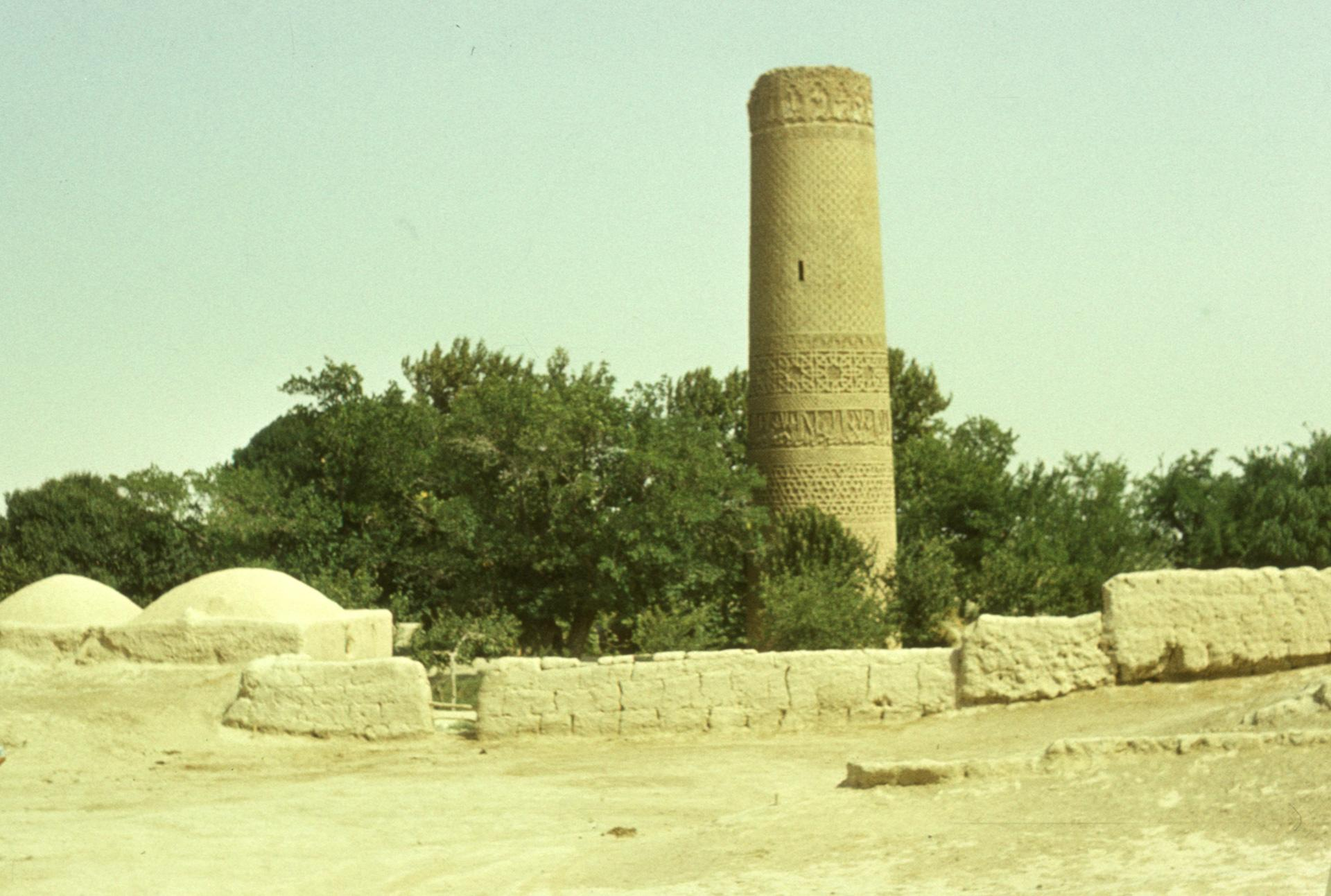
- Zadian Minaret in 1976

- Location within Afghanistan
- 37°1′29″N 66°56′37″E
- Type: Minaret
- Location: Zadian, Dawlatabad District, Balkh Province, Afghanistan

History
- Built: 12th century

Site notes
- Height: 25-metre (82 ft)

The Zadian Minaret is a minaret in Zadian, Balkh Province in north Afghanistan. It is located in the remote region of the Dawlatabad District, in northwestern Balkh Province.

== Etymology ==
The word 'minaret' is Arabic (منارة) and usually refers to a tower next to a mosque from which the muezzin calls the faithful to prayer. However, it can also mean lighthouse.

The minaret is nameless, so it is named after the village Zadian.

== History ==
The minaret was built by the Seljuk dynasty, during the 12th century. According to the Archaeological Gazetteer of Afghanistan, the minaret was built in 1108-09. However, some archaeological studies suggest that the date of the construction of the minaret is approximately around the year 760.

In the 12th century, the region was bypassed by Genghis Khan and the invading Mongols.

Archaeology has taken place in the district, including works by the French Archaeological Delegation in Afghanistan (DAFA).

As the minaret is climbable, local citizens have scaled the tower and some have fallen to their deaths in attempts.

== Site ==
The 25-metrehigh minaret was built in the 12th century and is made of sun-baked clay and plaster bricks. It is 18 meters in diameter. The structure has 64 stairs in it and there are carved calligraphic phrases in Kufic script.

=== Shrine of Hazrat Saleh ===
Afghan pilgrims have visited the minaret due to the adjacent shrine a hundred feet away. The shrine of Hazrat Saleh is located by the minaret. The shrine is associated with the Islamic prophet Saleh. The site is also associated with the Arabian site, Mada'in Saleh, Saudi Arabia. The green-draped tomb of Saleh inside the shrine is facing east, while Islamic graves are arranged so that it faces Mecca, which is west of Afghanistan, suggesting pre-Islamic origins of the site. On the outside, there is an arched niche where pilgrims have left pieces of mud in the hope of a cure for skin ailments.

=== Inscriptional content ===
- "In the name of God, the Merciful and Compassionate, Oh you believing people, called by the adhan on the day of Friday, try to pray to God. The building of this minaret - the great ruler - the trusted by the government and honor of the community, Abu Jafar Mohammed Ibn-Ali..."
- The rest of the inscription had been eroded.

== Gallery ==
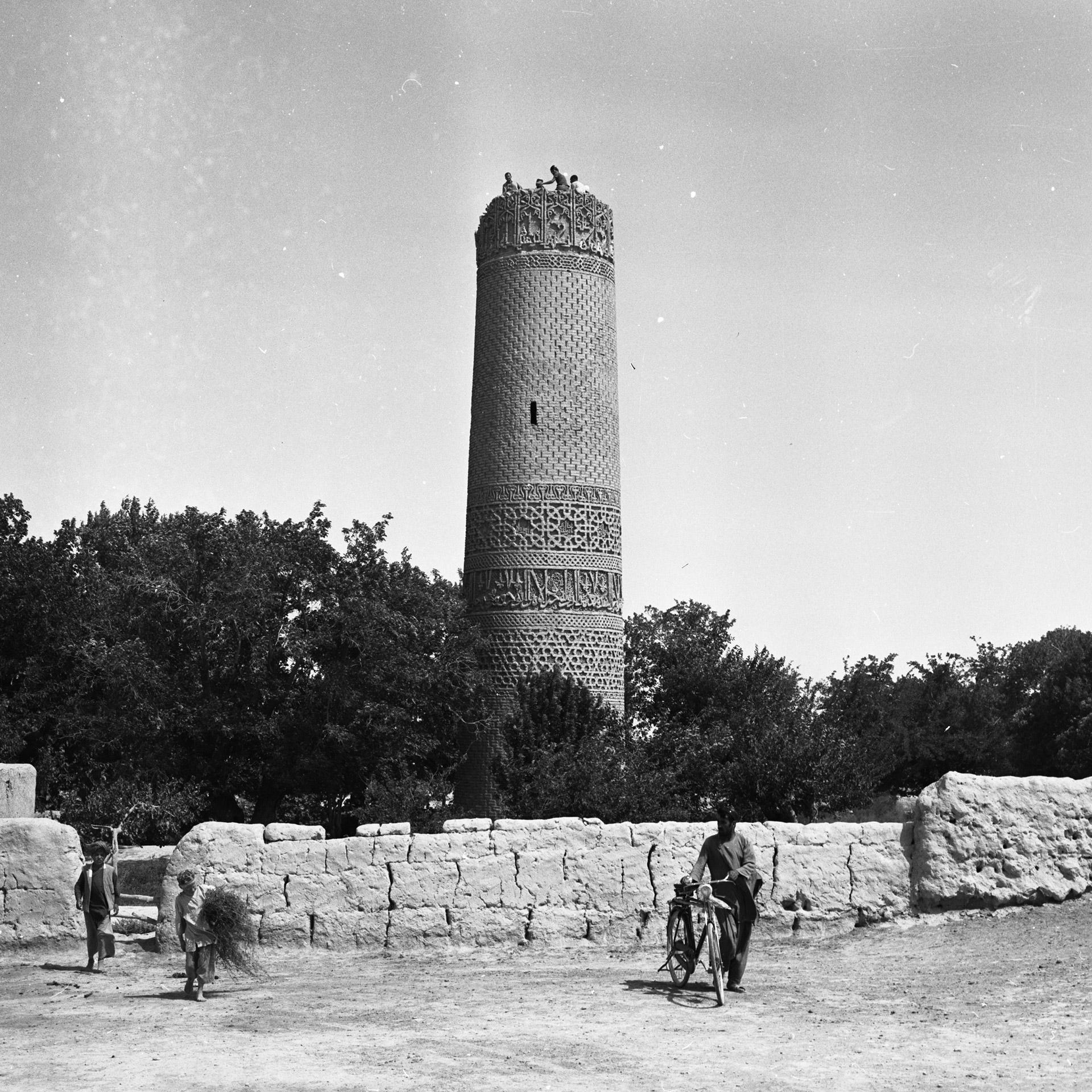
Minaret in 1976

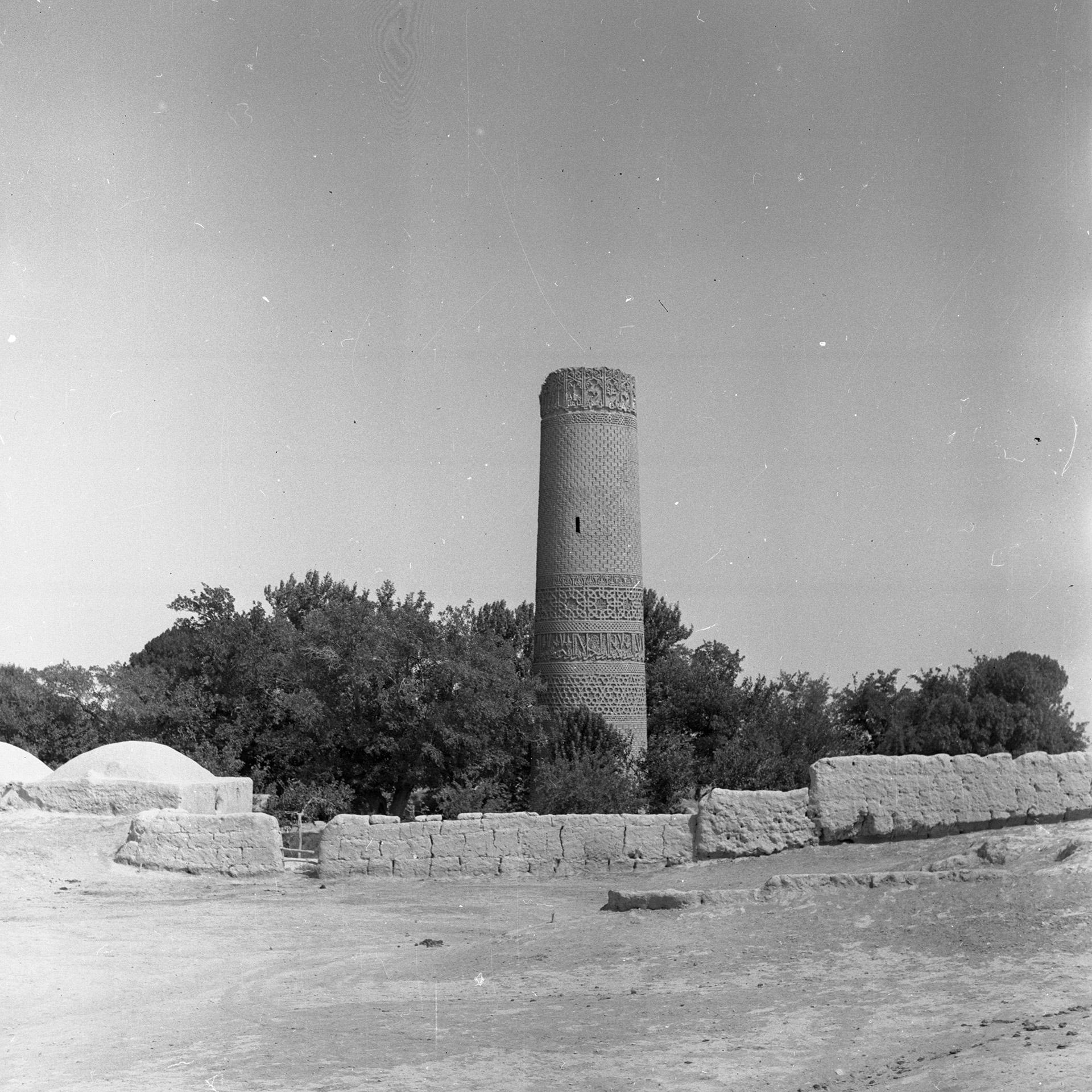
The shrine of Hazrat Saleh, left of the minaret

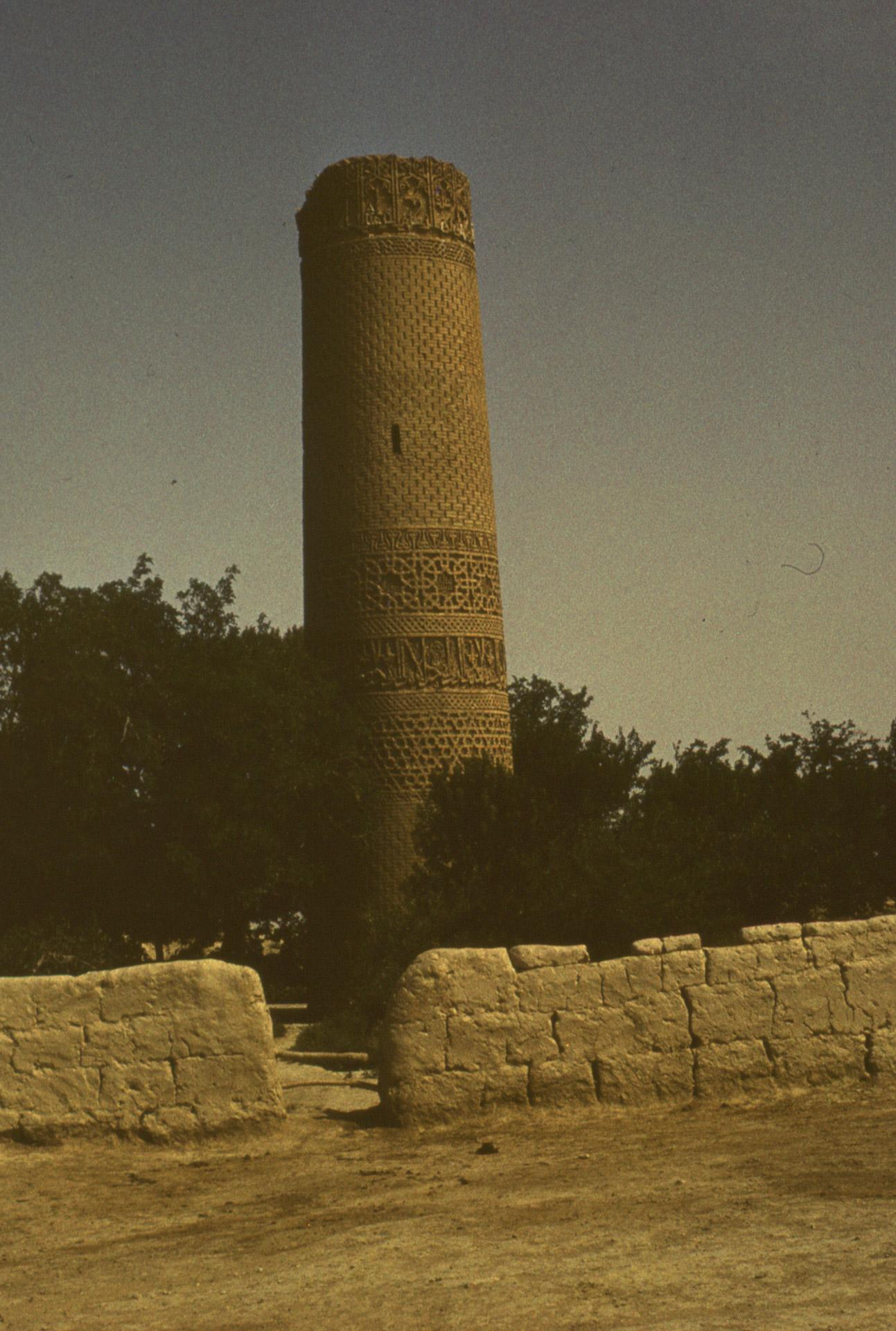
The minaret
