= Qowl Taq =

- Location in Afghanistan
- Coordinates: 37°4′20″N 66°45′52″E
- Country: Afghanistan
- Province: Balkh Province
- Time zone: + 4.30

Qowl Taq is a village in Balkh Province in northern Afghanistan.

== See also ==
- Balkh Province
