= Kheyrabad, Balkh =

- Location in Afghanistan
- Coordinates: 36°58′2″N 67°3′22″E
- Country: Afghanistan
- Province: Balkh Province
- Time zone: + 4.30

Kheyrabad, Balkh is a village in Balkh Province in northern Afghanistan.

== See also ==
- Balkh Province
