= Qarchi Gak =

- Location in Afghanistan
- Coordinates: 37°2′8″N 66°47′20″E
- Country: Afghanistan
- Province: Balkh Province
- Time zone: + 4.30

Qarchi Gak is a village in Balkh Province in northern Afghanistan.

== See also ==
- Balkh Province
