= Mosin–Nagant =

Russian five-shot, bolt-action military rifle

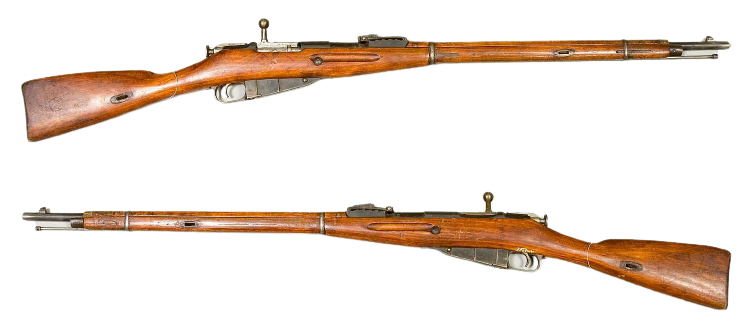
- Mosin–Nagant M1891 Dragoon from the collections at the Swedish Army Museum
- Type: Bolt-action rifle
- Place of origin: Russian Empire

Service history
- In service: 1891–present
- Used by: See Users
- Wars: List of conflicts: Pamirs Occupation; Armenian National Movement; Cretan Revolt (1897–1898); Boxer Rebellion; Russo-Japanese War; Russian Revolution of 1905; Persian Constitutional Revolution; First Balkan War; Second Balkan War; Urtatagai conflict (1913); World War I; Finnish Civil War; Estonian War of Independence; Russian Revolution; Russian Civil War; Polish–Soviet War; Mongolian Revolution of 1921; Turkish War of Independence; August Uprising; Urtatagai conflict (1925–1926); Northern Expedition; Chinese Civil War; Sino-Soviet conflict; Red Army intervention in Afghanistan (1929); Islamic rebellion in Xinjiang; Spanish Civil War; Second Sino-Japanese War; Second Italo-Ethiopian War; Soviet–Japanese border conflicts; Winter War; World War II; Continuation War; First Indochina War; Malayan Emergency; Korean War; 1954 Guatemalan coup d'état; Hungarian Revolution of 1956; Portuguese Colonial War; Communist insurgency in Thailand; Angolan Civil War; Lebanese Civil War; Yemeni Civil War; Sino-Indian War; Laotian Civil War; Vietnam War; Cambodian Civil War; Ogaden War; Cambodian–Vietnamese War; Thai–Laotian Border War; Afghan Civil War; Soviet–Afghan War; Iran–Iraq War; Tuareg rebellion (1990–1995); Yugoslav Wars; Georgian Civil War; War in Afghanistan; Iraq War; Libyan civil war (2011); Syrian civil war; Libyan civil war (2014–2020); Russo-Ukrainian War

Production history
- Designer: Sergei Mosin; Leon Nagant
- Designed: 1891
- Manufacturer: Tula; Izhevsk; Sestroryetsk; Châtellerault; Remington; New England Westinghouse Company; Radom; Cugir; FÉG
- Produced: 1891–1973
- No. built: c. 37,000,000 (Russia/Soviet Union)
- Variants: see Variants

Specifications
- Mass: 4 kg (8.8 lb) (M91/30); 3.4 kg (7.5 lb) (M38); 4.1 kg (9.0 lb) (M44)
- Length: 1,232 mm (48.5 in) (M91/30); 1,013 mm (39.9 in) (carbines)
- Barrel length: 730 mm (29 in) (M91/30); 514 mm (20.2 in) (carbines)
- Cartridge: 7.62×54mmR; 7.62×53mmR (Finnish variants only); 7.92×57mm Mauser (Polish variants & German captures); 8×50mmR Mannlicher (Austrian capture); .30-06 Springfield (Bannerman rifles for the US civilian market)
- Action: Bolt-action
- Muzzle velocity: M91/30: approx. 865 m/s (2,838 ft/s); M44: approx. 725 m/s (2,379 ft/s); M38: approx. 710 m/s (2,329 ft/s); Carbines: approx. 800 m/s (2,625 ft/s)
- Effective firing range: 500 m (550 yd), 850 m (930 yd) with optical sights
- Feed system: 5-round integral box magazine, loaded with 5-round stripper clips
- Sights: Rear: ladder, graduated from 100 m to 2,000 m (M91/30) and from 100 m to 1,000 m (M38 and M44); Front: hooded fixed post (drift adjustable) PU 3.5 and PEM scope also mounted

The Mosin–Nagant is a five-shot, bolt-action, internal magazine–fed military rifle. Known officially as the Russian 3-line rifle M1891, (Note: Russian: Русская 3-линейная (7,62-мм) винтовка Мосина образца 1891 года, romanized: Russkaya 3-lineynaya (7,62-mm) vintovka Mosina obraztsa 1891 goda, lit. 'Russian 3-line (7.62mm) Mosin rifle, model 1891'.) and informally in Russian as Mosin's rifle (Russian: винтовка Мосина, romanized: vintovka Mosina), or simply the mosinka (Russian: мосинка), it is primarily chambered for the 7.62×54mmR cartridge.

Developed from 1882 to 1891, it was used by the armed forces of the Russian Empire, the Soviet Union, and various other states. It is one of the most mass-produced military bolt-action rifles in history, with over 37 million units produced since 1891. Despite its age, it has been used in various conflicts around the world to the present day.

== History ==
=== Initial design and tests ===
During the Russo-Turkish War of 1877–1878, Imperial Russian troops, who were armed mostly with single-shot Berdan rifles, suffered heavy casualties against Ottoman troops equipped with Winchester 1866 repeating rifles, particularly at the bloody Siege of Pleven. This showed Russian commanders the need to modernize the general infantry weapon of the army.

Various weapons were acquired and tested by GAU of the Ministry of War of the Russian Empire, and in 1889 the Lebel Model 1886 rifle was obtained through semi-official channels from France. It was supplied together with a model of the cartridge and bullet but without primer or smokeless powder. Those problems were solved by Russian scientists and engineers (the smokeless powder, for instance, was produced by Dmitri Mendeleev himself).

In 1889, three rifles were submitted for evaluation: Captain Sergei Ivanovich Mosin of the imperial army submitted his "3-line" caliber (.30 cal, 7.62 mm) rifle; Belgian designer Léon Nagant submitted a "3.5-line" (.35 caliber, 9 mm) design; and a Captain Zinoviev submitted another "3-line" design (1 "line" = 1/10 in or 2.54 mm, thus 3 lines = 7.62 mm).

When trials concluded in 1891, the evaluators were split in their assessment. The main disadvantages of Nagant's rifle were a more complicated mechanism and a long and tiresome procedure of disassembling (which required special instruments—it was necessary to unscrew two fasteners). Mosin's rifle was mainly criticized for its lower quality of manufacture and materials, due to "artisan pre-production" of his 300 rifles. The commission initially voted 14 to 10 to approve Mosin's rifle. At this point the decision was made to rename the existing commission and call it Commission for creation of the small-bore rifle (Комиссия для выработки образца малокалиберного ружья), and to put on paper the final requirements for such a rifle. The inventors obliged by delivering their final designs. Head of the commission, General Chagin, ordered subsequent tests held under the commission's supervision, after which the bolt-action of Mosin's design was ordered into production under the name of 3-line rifle M1891 (трёхлинейная винтовка образца 1891 года).

The colloquial name "Mosin-Nagant" used in the West is persistent but erroneous, as established in Nagant's legal dispute.

=== Technical detail ===
Like the Gewehr 98, the 1891 Mosin uses two front-locking lugs to lock up the action. However, the Mosin's lugs lock in the horizontal position, whereas the Mauser locks vertically. The Mosin bolt body is multi-piece whereas the Mauser is one piece. The Mosin uses interchangeable bolt heads like the Lee–Enfield. Unlike the Mauser, which uses a controlled feed bolt head in which the cartridge base snaps up under the fixed extractor as the cartridge is fed from the magazine, the Mosin has a push feed recessed bolt head in which the spring-loaded extractor snaps over the cartridge base as the bolt is finally closed similar to the Gewehr 1888 and M91 Carcano or modern sporting rifles like the Remington 700. Like the Mauser, the Mosin uses a blade ejector mounted in the receiver. The Mosin bolt is removed by simply pulling it fully to the rear of the receiver and squeezing the trigger, while the Mauser has a bolt stop lever separate from the trigger.

Like the Mauser, the bolt lift arc on the Mosin–Nagant is 90 degrees, versus 60 degrees on the Lee–Enfield. The Mauser bolt handle is at the rear of the bolt body and locks behind the solid rear receiver ring. The Mosin bolt handle is similar to the Mannlicher: it is attached to a protrusion on the middle of the bolt body, which serves as a bolt guide, and it locks protruding out of the ejection/loading port in front of a split rear receiver ring, also serving a similar function to Mauser's "third" or "safety" lug.

The rifling of the Mosin barrel is right turning (clockwise looking down the rifle) 4-groove with a twist of 1:9.5" or 1:10". The 5-round fixed metallic magazine can either be loaded by inserting the cartridges individually, or more often in military service, by the use of 5-round stripper clips.

=== Initial production ===
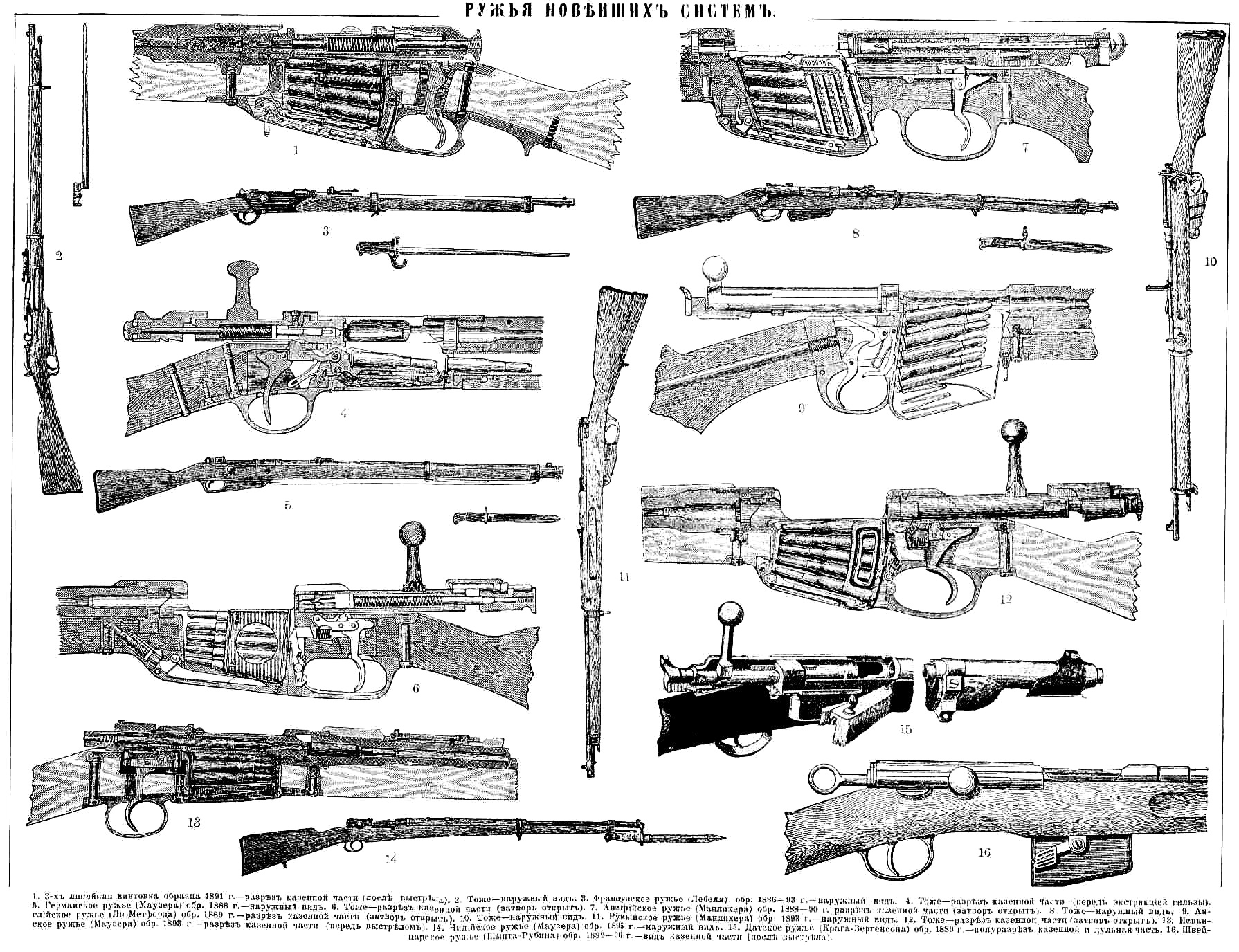
Schematic of Model 1891 (top left)

The 3-line rifle, Model 1891, its original official designation, was adopted by the Russian military in 1891. Production began in 1892 at the ordnance factories of Tula Arsenal, Izhevsk Arsenal and at Sestroryetsk Arsenal. An order for 500,000 rifles was placed with the French arms factory, Manufacture Nationale d'Armes de Châtellerault.

=== Refinement ===
There have been several refinements and variations of the original rifle, the most common being the M1891/30 (commonly referred to as "the 91/30" by shooters), which was a modernized design introduced in 1930. Some details were borrowed from Nagant's design.

- One such detail is the attachment of the magazine spring to the magazine base plate. In Mosin's original design the spring was not attached to the base plate and, according to the Commission, could be lost during maintenance, rifle cleaning.
- Another detail is the form of the clip that could hold five cartridges to be loaded simultaneously into the magazine.
- One more detail is the form of the interrupter, a specially designed part within the receiver, which helps prevent double feeding. The initial rifle proposed by Mosin lacked an interrupter, leading to numerous failures to feed. This detail was introduced in the rifle borrowing from Nagant's rifle. Although the form of the interrupter was slightly changed, this alteration was subsequently borrowed back by the Commission for the Model 1891. During the modernization of 1930, the form of the interrupter was further changed, from a single piece to a two-piece design, as the part had turned out to be one of the least reliable parts of the action. Only the clip for loading cartridges and the attachment of the magazine spring to the magazine base plate in subsequent models were designed by Nagant. Considering the rifle could be easily loaded without using a clip, one cartridge after another, the magazine spring attached to the magazine base plate is the only contribution of Nagant to all rifles after 1930.

=== Nagant's legal dispute ===
Despite the failure of Nagant's rifle, he filed a patent suit, claiming he was entitled to the sum the winner was to receive. It appeared that Nagant was the first to apply for the international patent protection over the interrupter, although he borrowed it from Mosin's design initially. Mosin could not apply for a patent since he was an officer of the Russian army, and the design of the rifle was owned by the Government and had the status of a military secret.

A scandal was about to burst out, with Nagant threatening he would not participate in trials held in Russia ever again and some officials proposing to expel Nagant from any further trials, as he borrowed the design of the interrupter after it was covered by the secrecy status given in Russia of that time to military inventions and therefore violated Russian law. Taking into consideration that Nagant was one of the few producers not engaged by competitive governments and generally eager to cooperate and share experience and technology, the Commission paid him a sum of 200,000 Russian rubles, equal to the premium that Mosin received as the winner. The rifle did not receive the name of Mosin, because of the personal decision taken by Tsar Alexander III, which was made based on the opinion of the Defence Minister Pyotr Vannovskiy: there are parts in this newly created design, invented by Colonel Rogovtzev, by Lt.-General Chagin's Commission, Captain Mosin and small-arms manufacturer Nagant, therefore it is only fair to call it the Russian 3-line rifle M1891. The Tsar himself dashed the word "Russian" from this document with his own hand. The decision to pay off Nagant proved wise, as he remained the major contractor for the Russian Government, and the Nagant M1895 revolver was subsequently adopted by the Russian army as its main sidearm.

However, in spite of the payment, Nagant attempted to use the situation for publicity, resulting in the name "Mosin–Nagant" appearing in the Western press.

From a technical point of view the rifle that came to be called "Mosin–Nagant" is the design proposed by Mosin as further amended by Mosin with some details borrowed from Nagant's design. Only since 1924 the rifle was officially named "Mosin's rifle" in the USSR, although some variants were still known only by their year of origin.

=== Russo-Japanese War ===
In 1889, Tsar Alexander III ordered the Imperial Russian Army to meet or exceed European standards in rifle developments with "rifles of reduced caliber and cartridges with smokeless powder". The new weapons would entail "high velocities", exceeding 600 metres per second (2,000 ft/s) and would result in land battles both commencing and being capable of being fought at longer ranges, nearly two kilometers. The new Mosin rifles would replace the Berdan rifles then in use by the Russian army.

The Mosin rifle was first tested in combat in 1893, during clashes between Russian and Afghan troops in the Pamirs.

The Russo-Japanese War (1904–1905) was the rifle's first major conflict. By the time the war broke out in 1904, approximately 3.8 million had been built, with over 1.5 million in the hands of the Russian cavalry and all of its reserves when hostilities commenced.

Between the adoption of the final design in 1891 and the year 1910, several variants and modifications to the existing rifles were made.

=== World War I ===
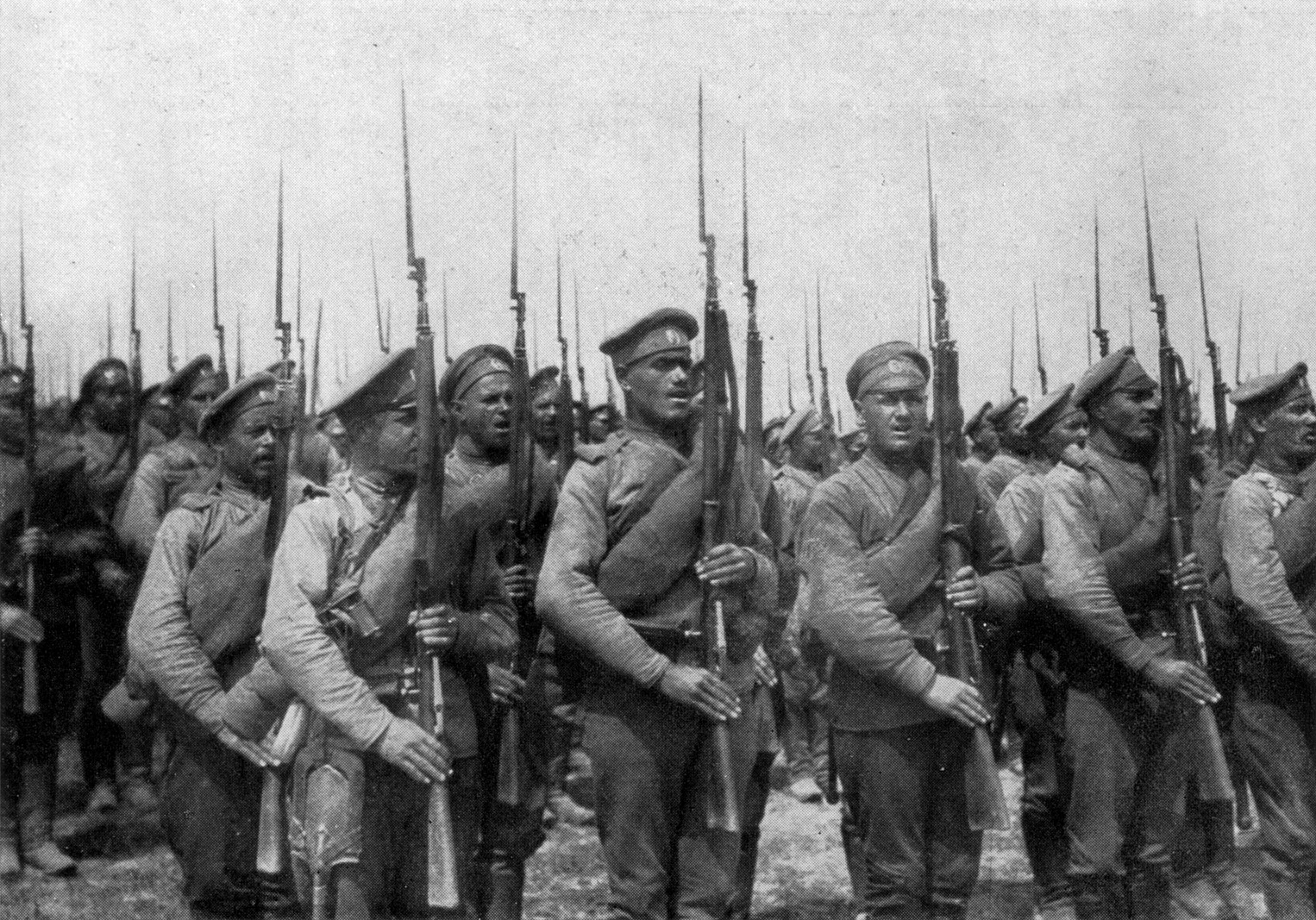
Russian Imperial infantry of World War I armed with Mosin–Nagant rifles

With the start of World War I, production was restricted to the M1891 dragoon and infantry models for the sake of simplicity. Due to the desperate shortage of arms and the shortcomings of a still-developing domestic industry, the Russian government ordered 1.5 million M1891 infantry rifles from Remington Arms and another 1.8 million from New England Westinghouse Company in the United States in 1915. Remington produced 750,000 rifles before production was halted by the 1917 October Revolution. Deliveries to Russia had amounted to 469,951 rifles when the Treaty of Brest-Litovsk ended hostilities between the Central Powers and now Soviet-Russia. Henceforth, the new Bolshevik government of Vladimir Lenin cancelled payments to the American companies manufacturing the Mosin–Nagant (Russia had not paid for the order at any time throughout the Great War).

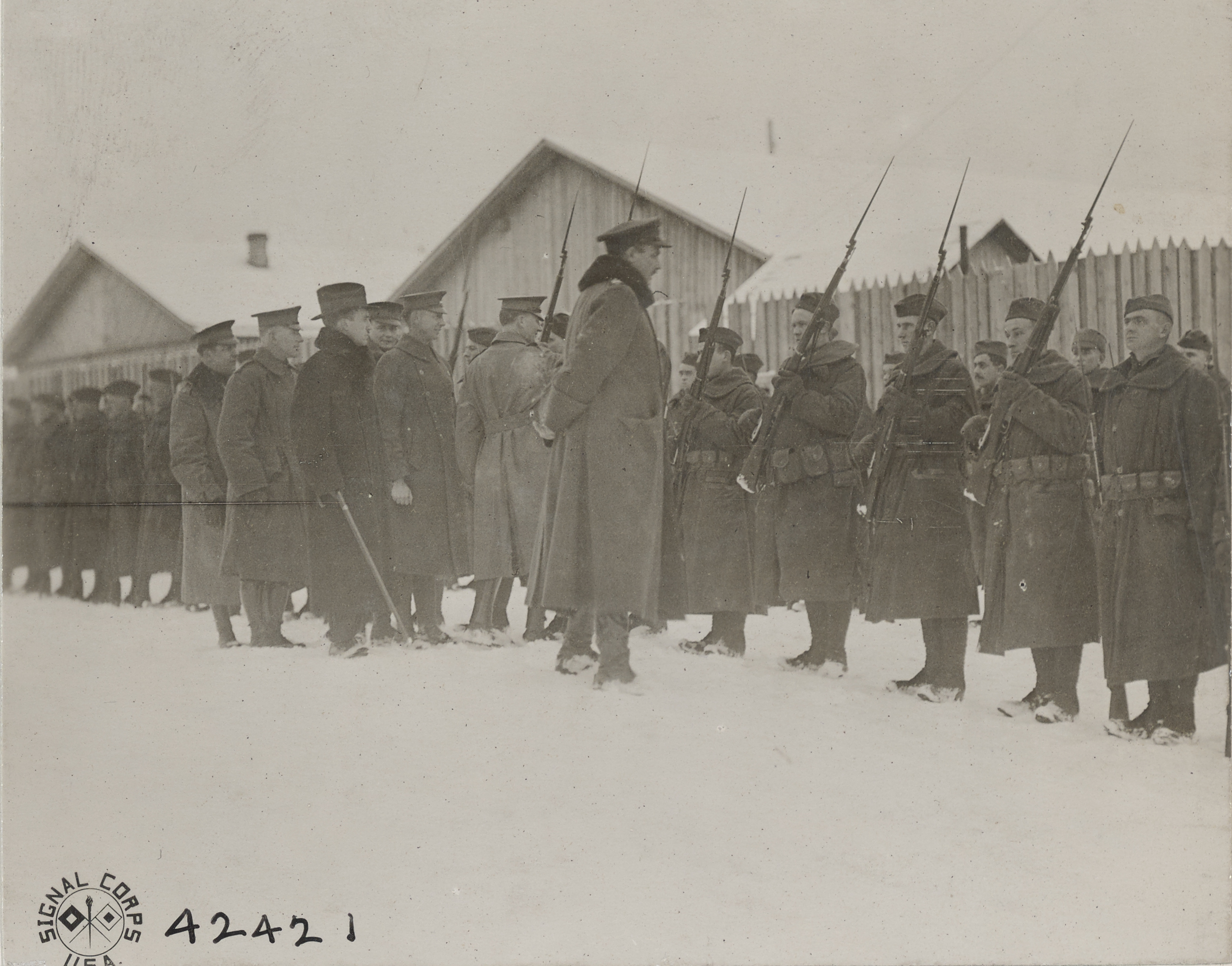
Arkhangelsk, Russia, November 20, 1918. The US 339th Infantry Regiment, equipped with Mosin-Nagant rifles, is inspected by British General Edmund Ironside, commander of the North Russia intervention Force.

With Remington and Westinghouse on the precipice of bankruptcy from the Communists' decision, the remaining 280,000 rifles were purchased by the United States Army. American and British expeditionary forces of the North Russia Campaign were armed with these rifles and sent to Murmansk and Arkhangelsk in the late summer of 1918 to prevent the large quantities of munitions delivered for Tsarist forces from being captured by the Central Powers. Remaining rifles were used for the training of U.S. Army troops. Some were used to equip U.S. National Guard, SATC, and ROTC units. Designated "U.S. Rifle, 7.62mm, Model of 1916", these are among the rarest of American service arms. In 1917, 50,000 rifles were sent via Vladivostok to the Czechoslovak Legions in Siberia to aid in their attempt to secure passage to France.

Many of the New England Westinghouse and Remington Mosin–Nagants were sold to private citizens in the United States before World War II through the office of the Director of Civilian Marksmanship, the predecessor to the federal government's current Civilian Marksmanship Program.

Large numbers of Mosin–Nagants were captured by German and Austro-Hungarian forces and saw service with the rear-echelon forces of both armies, and also with the Imperial German Navy. Many of these weapons were sold to Finland in the 1920s.

=== Civil War, modernization, and wars with Finland ===
During the Russian Civil War, infantry and dragoon versions were still in production, though in dramatically reduced numbers. The rifle was widely used by all belligerents in the civil war. In 1924, following the victory of the Red Army, a committee was established to modernize the rifle, which had by then been in service for over three decades. This effort led to the development of the Model 91/30 rifle, which was based on the design of the original dragoon version. The barrel length was shortened by 7 cm (2.8 in). The sight measurements were converted from arshins to meters; and the front sight blade was replaced by a hooded post front sight less susceptible to being knocked out of alignment. There were also minor modifications to the bolt, but not enough to prevent interchangeability with the earlier Model 1891 and the so-called "Cossack dragoon" rifles.

Finland was a Grand Duchy in the Russian Empire until 1917, so Finns had long used the Mosin–Nagant in service with the Imperial military. The rifle was used in the short Finnish Civil War and adopted as the service rifle of the new republic's army. Finland produced several variants of the Mosin–Nagant, all of them manufactured using the receivers of Russian-made, American-made, French-made or (later) Soviet-made rifles. Finland also utilized a number of captured M91 and M91/30 rifles with minimal modifications. As a result, the rifle was used on both sides of the Winter War and the Continuation War during World War II. Finnish Mosin–Nagants were produced by SAKO, Tikkakoski, and VKT, with some using barrels imported from Switzerland and Germany. In assembling M39 rifles, Finnish armorers reused "hex" receivers that dated back as far as 1891. Finnish rifles are characterized by Russian, French or American-made receivers stamped with a boxed SA, as well as many other parts produced in those countries and barrels produced in Finland, Switzerland, Austria, Belgium and Germany. The Finns also manufactured two-piece "finger splice" stocks for their Mosin–Nagant rifles.

In addition, the rifle was distributed as aid to Republican anti-Franco forces in the Spanish Civil War. Spanish Civil War Mosins can be readily identified by the wire sling hangers inserted in the slots in the forearm and buttstock meant to take the Russian "dog collars" for Russian-style slings, so the rifles could accept Western European–style rifle slings.

=== World War II ===
At the beginning of the war, the Mosin–Nagant 91/30 was the standard-issue weapon of Soviet troops. Millions were produced in World War II for use by the largest mobilized army in history.

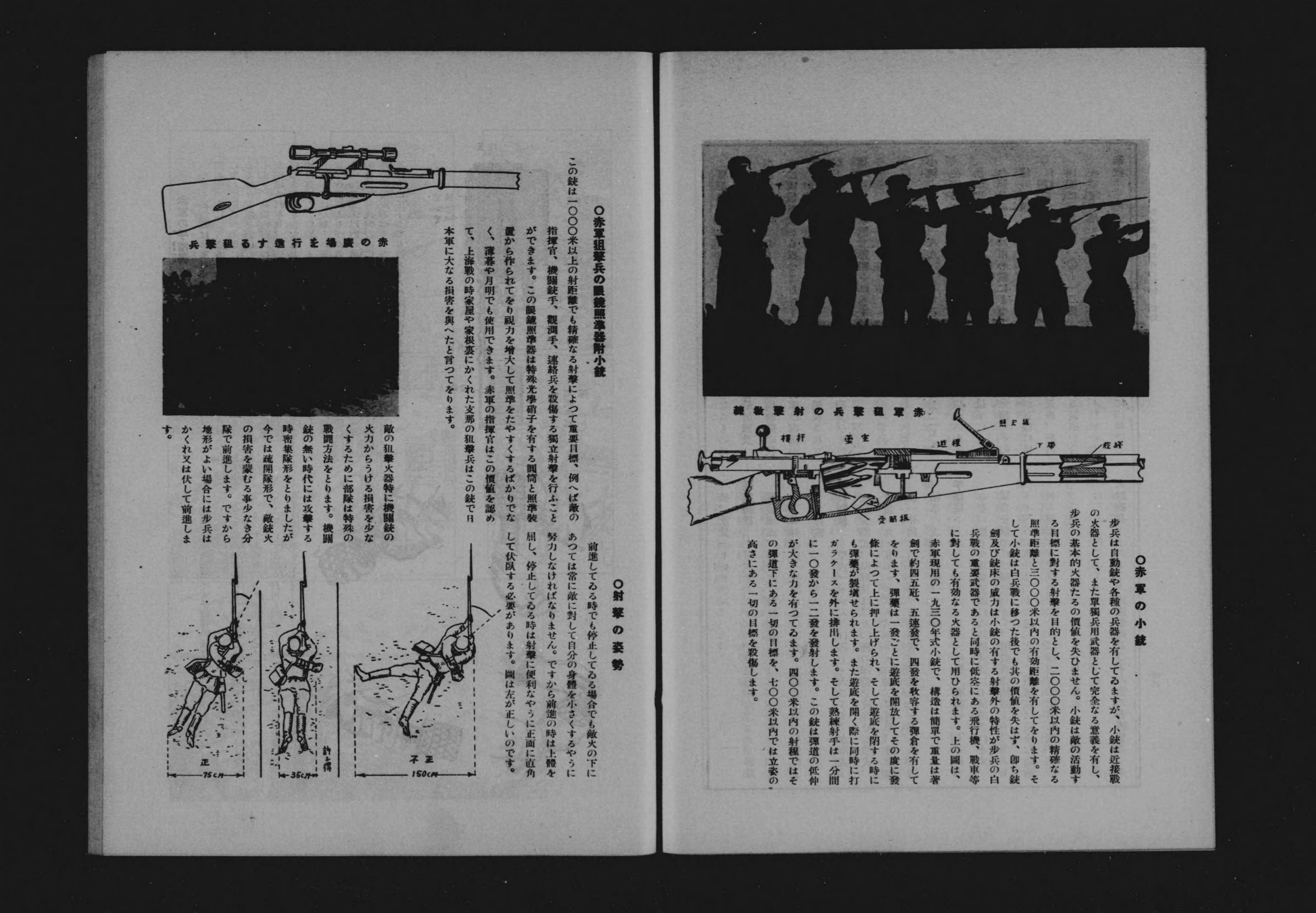
A book published by the Japanese Army Magazine in 1938, quoted a Soviet Red Army military adviser's conversation, talking about the Mosin-Nagant sniper rifles (with a PE or PEM scope), which were used by the Chinese military in the Battle of Shanghai (1937), caused great losses to the Japanese army.

The Mosin–Nagant Model 1891/30 was modified and adapted as a sniper rifle from 1932 onwards, first with mounts and scopes from Germany then with domestic designs (PE, PEM) from 1931; from 1942 it was issued with 3.5-power PU fixed focus scopes. It served quite prominently in the brutal urban battles on the Eastern Front, such as the Battle of Stalingrad, which made heroes of such snipers as Vasily Zaitsev, Lyudmila Pavlichenko, Ivan Sidorenko, and Roza Shanina. Finland also employed the Mosin–Nagant as a sniper rifle, with similar success with their own designs and captured Soviet rifles. For example, Simo Häyhä is credited with having killed 505 Soviet soldiers, many of whom fell victim to his Finnish M/28-30 derivative. Häyhä did not use a scope on his Mosin. In interviews Häyhä gave before his death, he said that the scope and mount designed by the Soviets required the shooter to expose himself too much and raise his head too high, increasing the chances of being spotted by the enemy. In addition, scopes tended to reflect sunlight when moved side to side, which gave away a sniper's position.

In 1935–1936, the 91/30 was again modified, this time to lower production time. The "hex" receiver was changed to a round receiver. When war with Germany broke out, the need to produce Mosin–Nagants in vast quantities led to a further simplification of machining and a falling-off in finish of the rifles. The wartime Mosins are easily identified by the presence of tool marks and rough finishing that never would have passed the inspectors in peacetime. However, despite a lack of both aesthetic focus and uniformity, the basic functionality of the Mosins was unimpaired.

In addition, in 1938 a carbine version of the Mosin–Nagant, the M38, was issued. It used the same cartridge and action as other Mosins, but the barrel was shortened by 21.6 cm (8.5 in) to bring the weapon down to an overall length of 101.6 cm (40.0 in), with the forearm shortened in proportion. The idea was to issue the M38 to troops such as combat engineers, signal corps, and artillerymen, who could conceivably need to defend themselves from sudden enemy advances, but whose primary duties lay behind the front lines. Significantly, the front sight of the M38 was positioned in such a way that the Model 91/30's cruciform bayonet could not be mounted to the muzzle even if a soldier obtained one.

An increase in urban combat led directly to the development of the Model M44 Mosin. In essence, the M44 is an M38 with a slightly modified forearm and with a permanently mounted cruciform bayonet that folds to the right when it is not needed. It was an improvement on the Model 91/30, particularly for urban warfare; but few M44s saw combat on the Eastern Front.

By the end of the war, approximately 19.8 million Mosin–Nagant rifles had been produced.

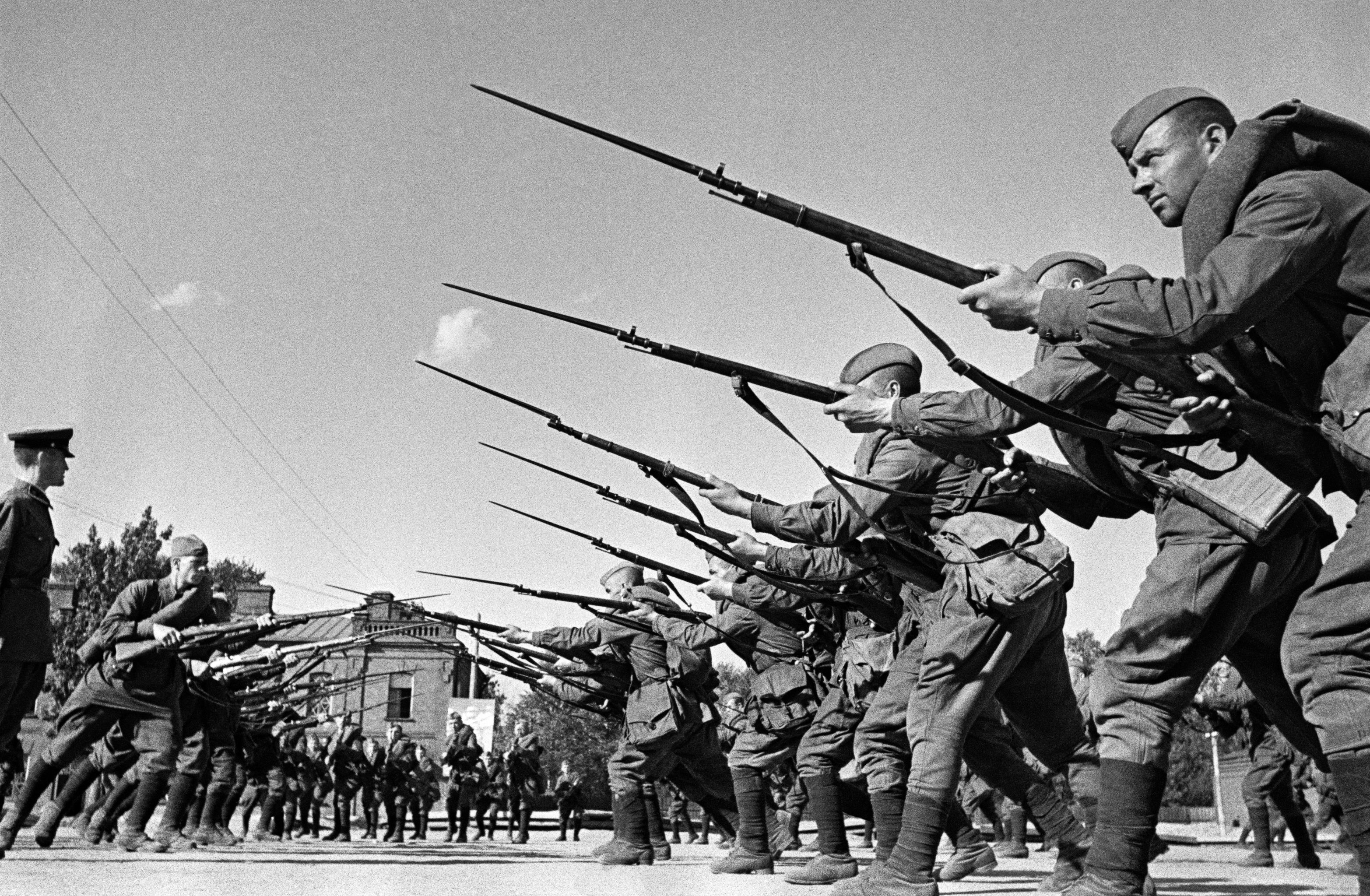
Soldiers of the Voroshilov Regiment training to use Mosin–Nagant rifles before going to the front line. Moscow, August 1941

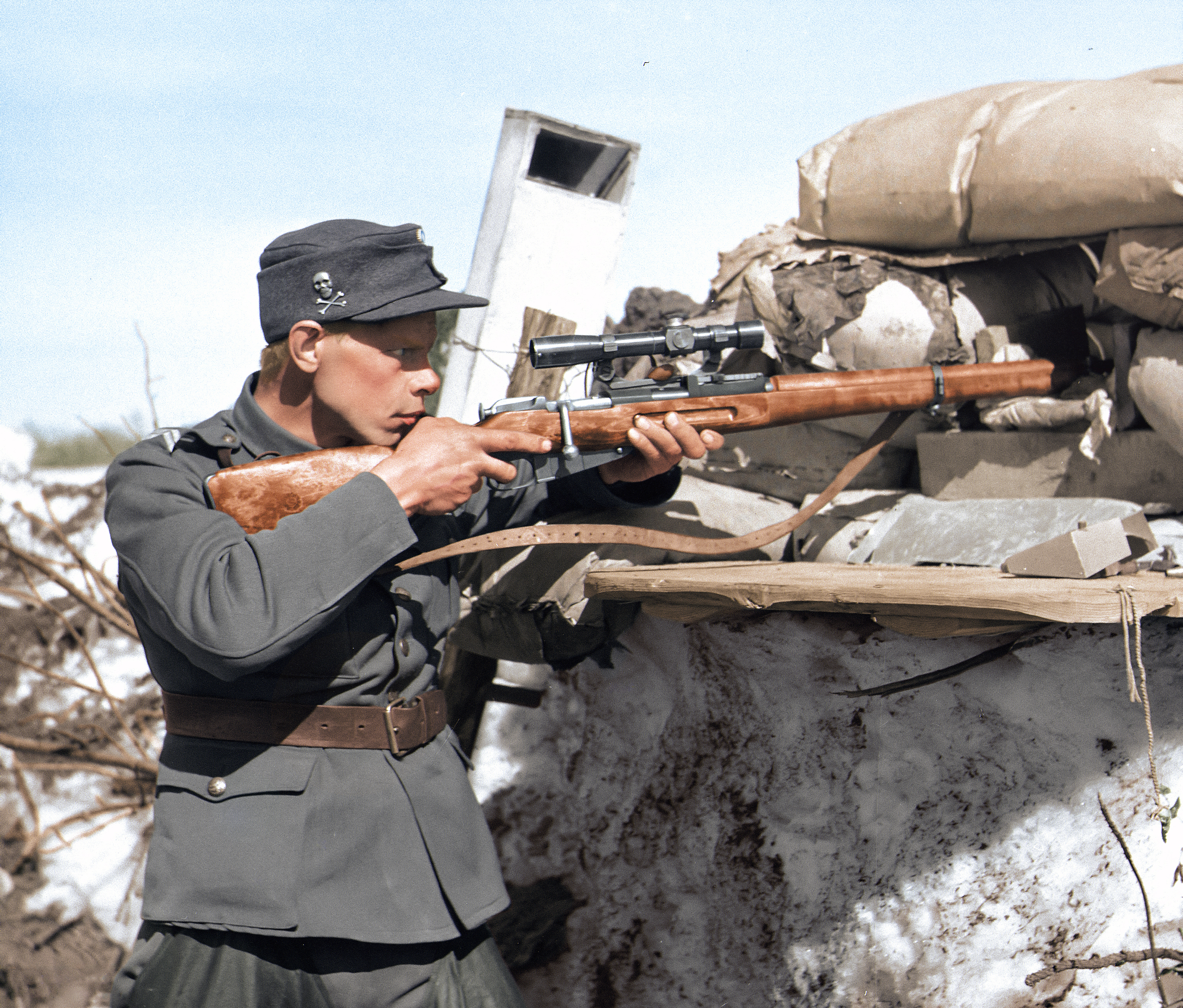
Finnish Corporal Onni Ryyppö of the 44th Border Jäger Company, use a captured Mosin-Nagant sniper rifle with PEM scope in the frontlines at Valkeasaari (Beloostrov), Karelian isthmus, 15 April 1942

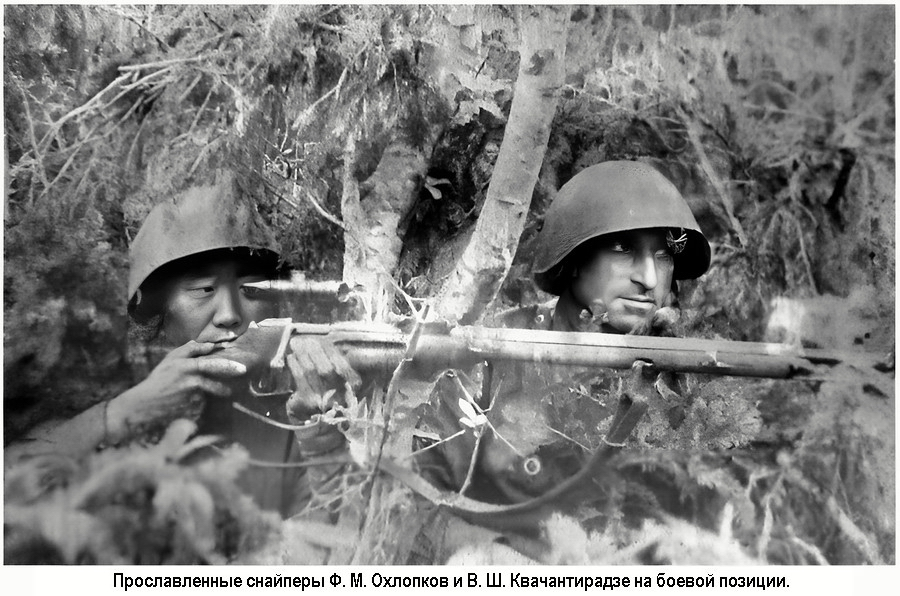
Famous Soviet sniper duo Fyodor Okhlopkov and Vasilij Kvachantiradze use a Mosin-Nagant sniper rifle with PU scope

=== Korean War ===
During the Korean War, Model 1891/30 served as the standard service rifle of North Korean military. In defensive combat, riflemen were trained to open fire once a target came within 400 meters; however, sharpshooters were instructed to engage targets from distances up to 600 meters. On average, a rifleman was issued 100 rounds of ammunition.

Model 1938 and 1944 carbines were also used by both Chinese and the North Korean military as the standard service rifle of non-combat troops and non-commissioned officers.

=== Increased world-wide use ===
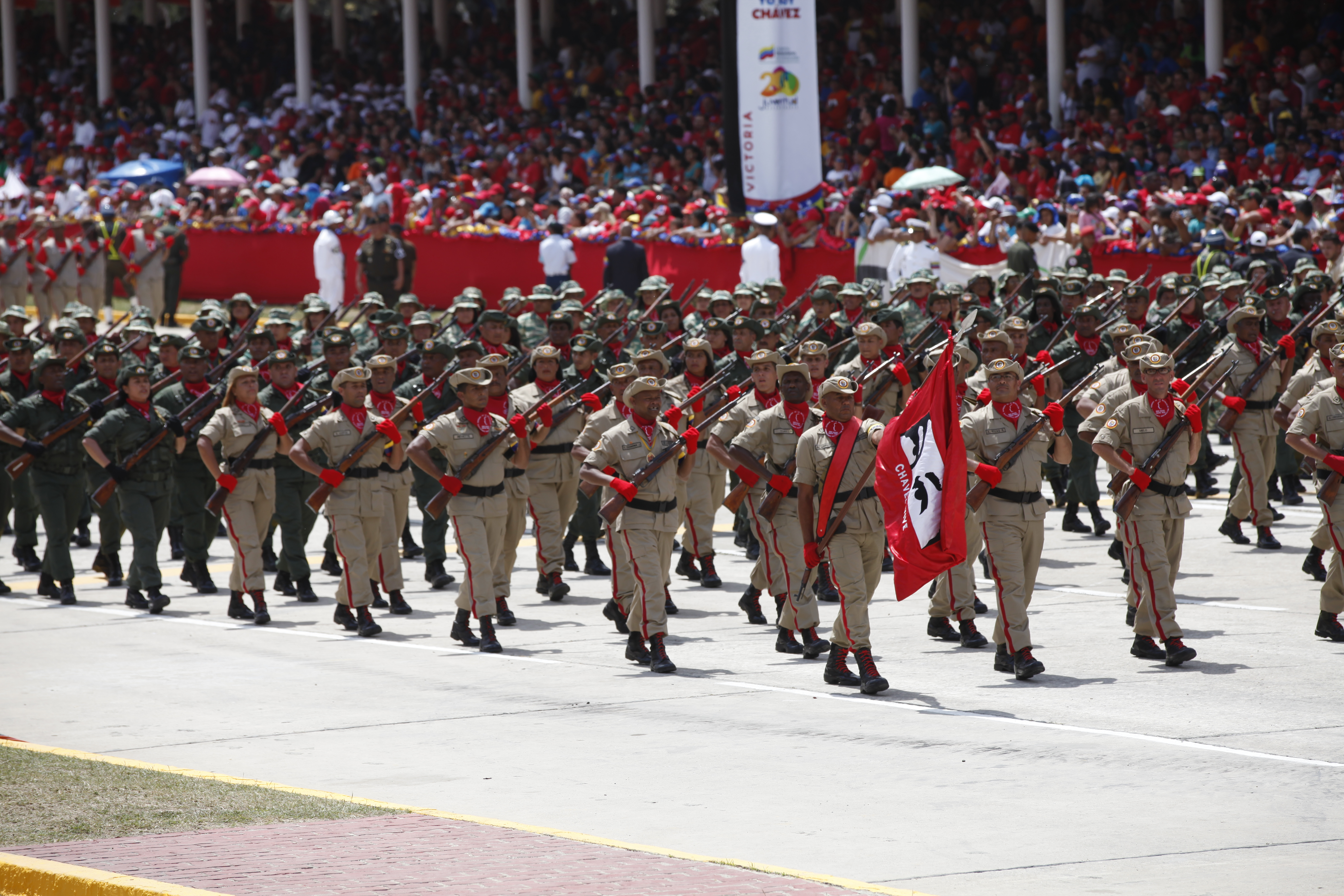
Venezuelan National Militia armed with Mosin-Nagant rifles on parade in Caracas, Venezuela, on 5 March 2014

In the years after World War II, the Soviet Union ceased production of all Mosin–Nagants and withdrew them from service in favor of the SKS series carbines and eventually the AK series rifles. Despite its increasing obsolescence, the Mosin–Nagant saw continued service throughout the Eastern bloc and the rest of the world for many decades to come. Mosin–Nagant rifles and carbines saw service on many fronts of the Cold War, from Korea and Vietnam to Afghanistan and along the Iron Curtain in Europe. They were kept not only as reserve stockpiles, but front-line infantry weapons as well. Finland was still producing the M39 Mosin–Nagant in small numbers as late as 1973.

Virtually every country that received military aid from the Soviet Union, China, and Eastern Europe during the Cold War used Mosin–Nagants at various times. Middle Eastern countries within the sphere of Soviet influence—Egypt, Syria, Iraq, Afghanistan, and Palestinian fighters—have received them in addition to other more modern arms. Mosin–Nagants have also seen action in the hands of Soviet, Afghan and Mujahadeen forces in Afghanistan during the Soviet Afghan War of the 80s and the following civil wars of the late 1980s and 90s. Their use in Afghanistan continued on well into the 1990s and the early 21st century by Northern Alliance forces.

Use of the Mosin–Nagant has continued into the 21st century, with the rifle seeing action during the Russo-Ukrainian War with pro-Russian separatists in eastern Ukraine.

== Variants ==
=== Russia/USSR ===
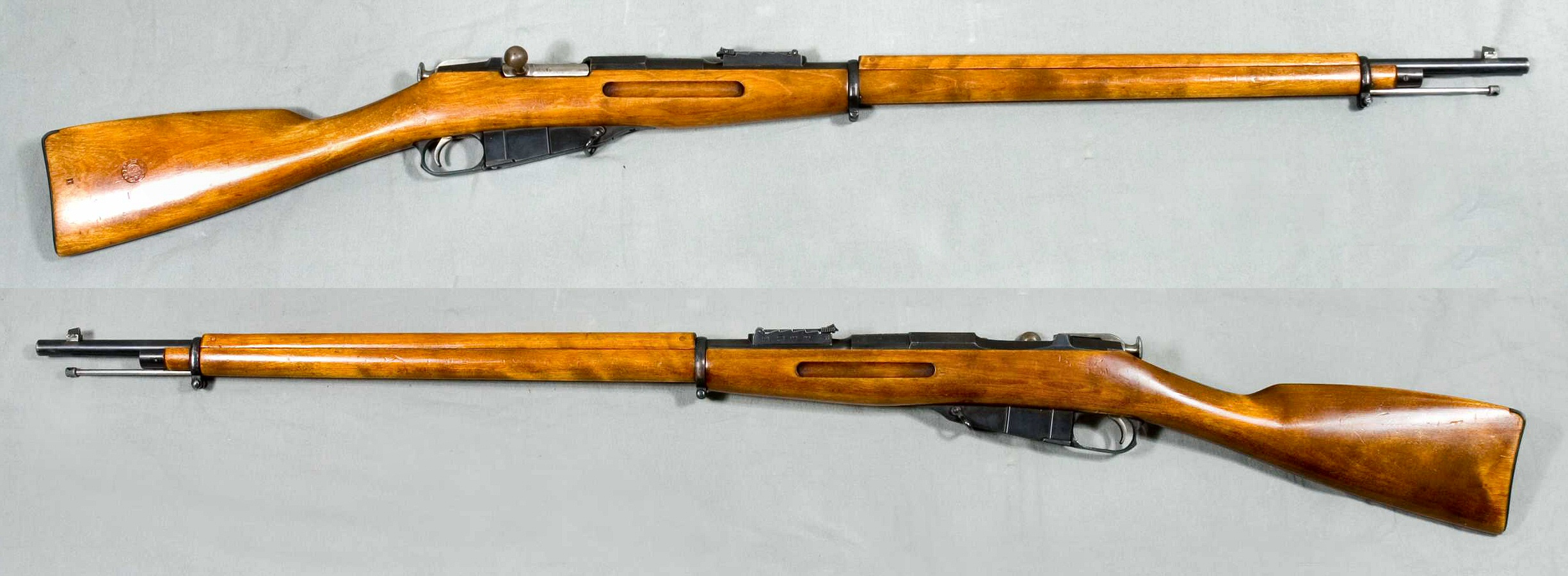
Mosin–Nagant Model 1891 Infantry Rifle

- Model 1891 Infantry Rifle (Russian: пехотная винтовка образца 1891–го года): The primary weapon of Russian and Red Army infantry from 1891 to 1930. Between 1891 and 1910 the following modifications were made to the design of the rifle:
  - Changed sights.
  - Inclusion of a reinforcing bolt through the finger groove (due to the adoption of a higher velocity 147-grain pointed M1908 'spitzer' light ball round.)
  - Elimination of the steel finger rest behind the trigger guard.
  - New barrel bands.
  - Installation of slot-type sling mounts to replace the more traditional swivels.

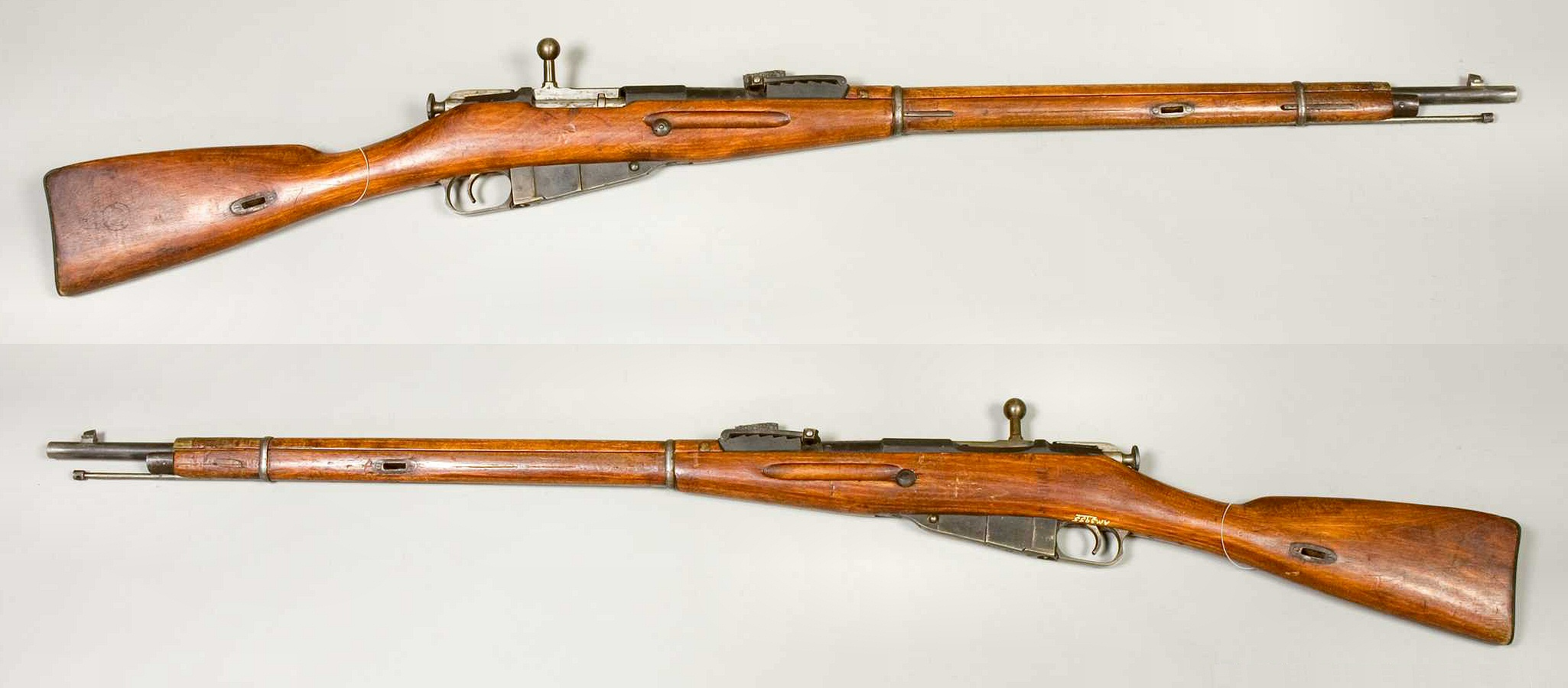
Mosin–Nagant Model 1891 Dragoon Rifle (Note that the bolt is in the unlocked position.)

- Dragoon Rifle (Russian: драгунская): Intended for use by Dragoons: 64 mm (2.5 in) shorter and 0.4 kg (0.9 lb) lighter than the M1891. The Dragoon rifle's dimensions are identical to the later M1891/30 rifle, and most Dragoon rifles were eventually reworked into M1891/30s. Most such rifles, known to collectors as "ex-Dragoons", can be identified by their pre-1930 date stampings, but small numbers of Dragoon rifles were produced from 1930 to 1932 and after reworking became impossible to distinguish from purpose-built M1891/30s.
- Cossack Rifle (казачья): Introduced for Cossack horsemen, it is almost identical to the Dragoon rifle but is sighted for use without a bayonet. These rifles were also issued without a bayonet.
- Model 1907 Carbine: At 289 mm (11.4 in) shorter and 0.95 kg (2.1 lb) lighter than the M1891, this model was excellent for cavalry, engineers, signalers, and artillerymen. It was stocked nearly to the front sight and therefore did not take a bayonet. It was produced until at least 1917 in small numbers.

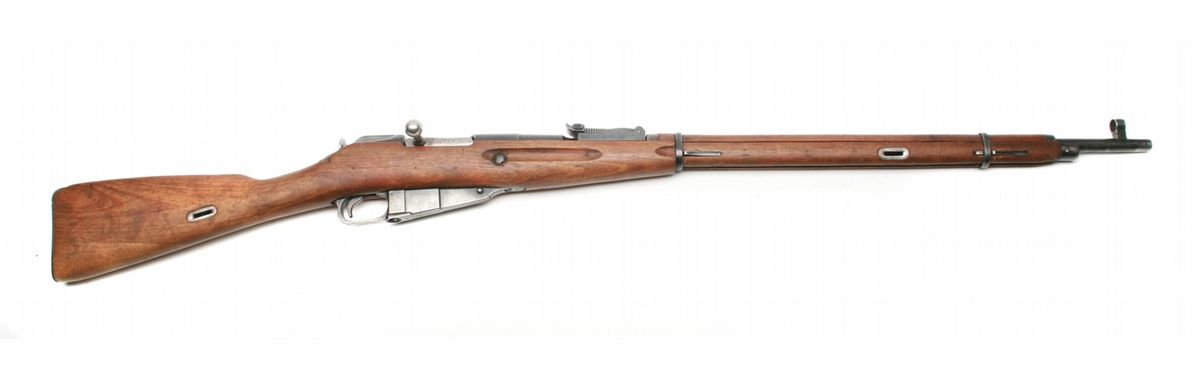
Mosin–Nagant Model 1891/30

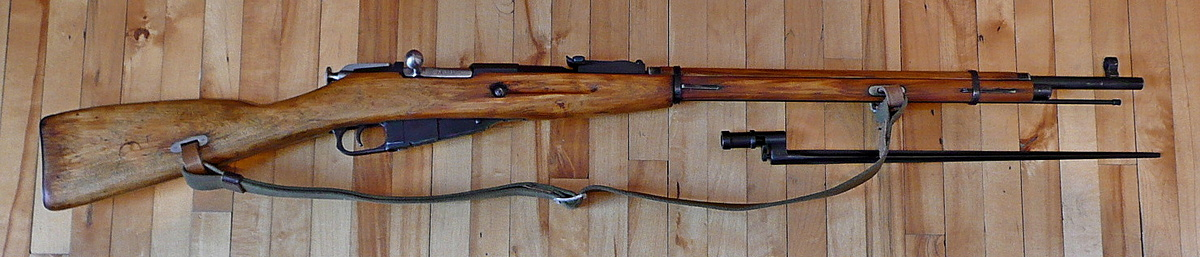
Mosin–Nagant Model 1891/30 (1933)

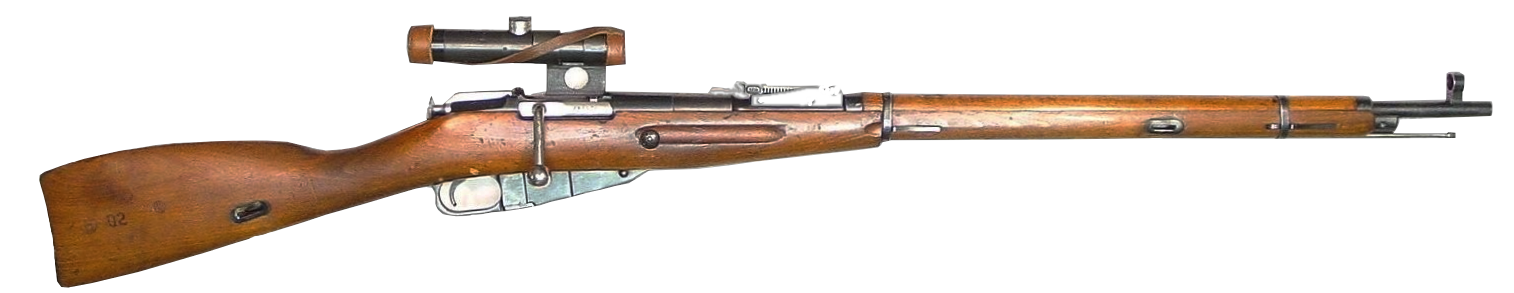
Soviet Mosin–Nagant model 1891/30 sniper rifle with PU 3.5×21 sight

- Model 1891/30 (винтовка образца 1891/30-го года, винтовка Мосина): The most prolific version of the Mosin–Nagant. It was produced for standard issue to all Soviet infantry from 1930 to 1945. Most Dragoon rifles were also converted to the M1891/30 standard. It was commonly used as a sniper rifle in World War II. Early sniper versions had a 3.87×30 PE or PEM scope, a Soviet-made copy of a Zeiss design, while later rifles used smaller, simpler, and easier-to-produce 3.5×21 PU scopes. Because the scope was mounted above the chamber, the bolt handle was replaced with a longer handled, bent version on sniper rifles (known to Mosin collectors and shooters as a "bent bolt") so the shooter could work the bolt without the scope interfering with it. Like the US M1903A4 Springfield sniper rifle, the location of the scope above the receiver prevents the use of stripper clips. Its design was based on the Dragoon rifle with the following modifications:
  - Flat rear sights and restamping of sights in metres, instead of arshinii.
  - A cylindrical receiver, replacing the octagonal receiver (commonly called "hex", but actually having five octagonal top flats and a round bottom rather than three octagonal bottom flats. It has six "sides" but is neither hexagonal nor octagonal in normal use of those terms.) Early production 91/30s (from 1930 to 1936) and converted Dragoon rifles retained the octagonal receiver. These rifles are less common and regarded as generally more desirable by collectors.
  - A hooded post front sight, replacing the blade on previous weapons.

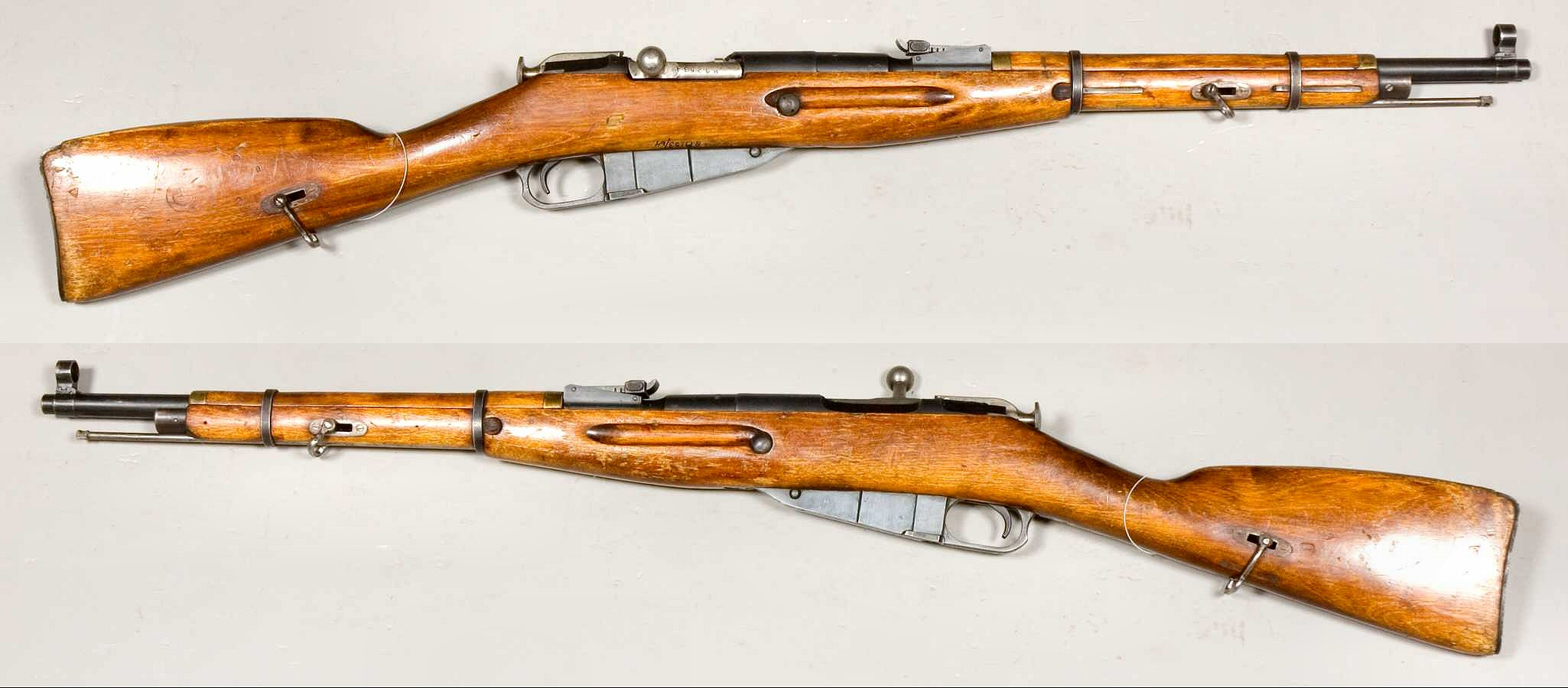
Mosin–Nagant Model 1938 Carbine

- Model 1938 Carbine: A carbine based on the M1891/30 design that was produced from 1939 to 1945 at the Izhevsk arsenal and in 1940 and 1944 at Tula. They were intended for use by second-echelon and noncombatant troops. Very few M38 carbines were made in 1945 and are highly sought after by collectors. Essentially a M1891/30 with a shortened barrel and shortened stock (the M38 is 1000 millimeters (40 in) in overall length versus 1230 millimeters (48 in) overall length for the Model 91/30), this carbine did not accept a bayonet and was in fact designed so that the standard Model 91/30 bayonet would not fit it. However many M38 carbines were fitted into M44 stocks by the Soviets as a wartime expedient. M38s in the correct M38 stock command a premium over M38s in M44 pattern stocks. The M38 was replaced by the M44 carbine in 1944.
- Model 1944 Carbine: This carbine was introduced into service in late 1944 (with 50,000 service-test examples produced in 1943) and remained in production until 1948. They were produced from 1943 to 1948 at the Izhevsk arsenal and only 1944 at Tula. Its specifications are very similar to the M1938, with the unique addition of a permanently affixed, side-folding cruciform-spike bayonet. A groove for the folded bayonet is inlet into the right side of the stock. From February 1944, this type of carbine was issued to Red Army infantry troops as a replacement for the standard rifle. These were in use not only by the Soviet Union, but also its various satellite nations. Many of these were counterbored post-war.
- Model 1891/59 Carbine: Commonly called "91/59s," the M1891/59s were created by shortening M1891/30 rifles to carbine length, with rear sight numbers partially ground off to reflect reduced range. These rifles are almost clones of the M38 except for the ground off M91/30 rear sight. The "1891/59" marking on the receiver suggests the carbines were created in or after 1959. It was initially thought that Bulgaria or another Soviet satellite country performed the conversions in preparation for a Western invasion that never came. Recent evidence suggests that the M91/59 was indeed produced in Bulgaria from Soviet-supplied wartime production M91/30s. Total production of the 91/59 is uncertain; figures as low as one million and as high as three million have appeared in firearm literature.
- AV: Soviet target rifle
- OTs-48/OTs-48K: The OTs-48/OTs-48K (ОЦ-48К) sniper rifle was designed around 2000 in an attempt to make use of many surplus Mosin M1891/30 rifles which were still held in storage in Russia. Developed and manufactured "on order" by Central Design Bureau for Sporting and Hunting Arms (TSKIB SOO) in the city of Tula, this rifle is still in limited use by some Russian law enforcement agencies today.

=== Estonia ===
After the Estonian War of Independence, Estonia had around 120,000 M/1891s in stock, later the Kaitseliit, the Estonian Defence League, received some Finnish M28/30 rifles, a few modernised variants were also made by the Estonian Armory;

- M1933 or 1891/33 was standard rifle of Estonian armed forces.
- M1938: a further variant of M1933, 12,000 rifles.
- KL300: a variant for Kaitseliit, 4,025 were made.
- M1935 "Lühendatud sõjapüss M1935": "shortened rifle M1935" was a shortened variant of M1933 with 600mm barrel, 6,770 rifles.

=== Finland ===
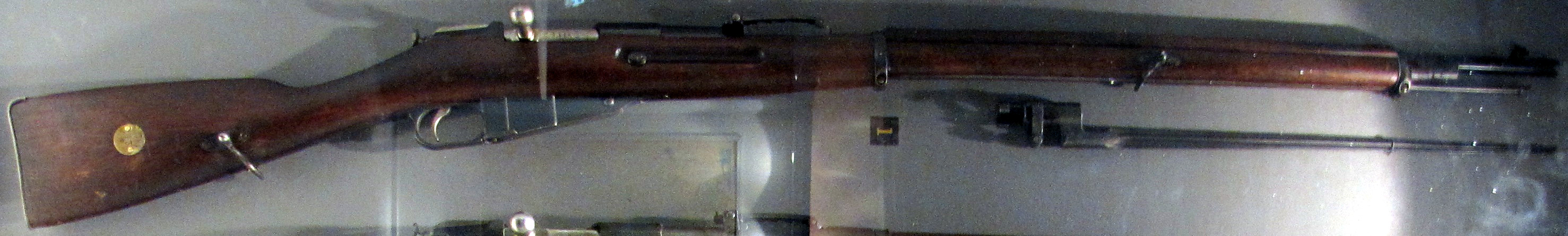
Finnish Army Model 91

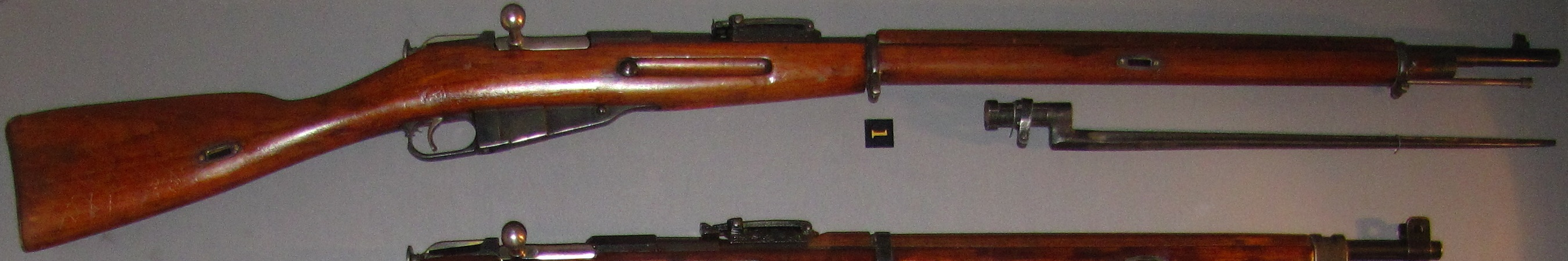
Civil Guard Model 24

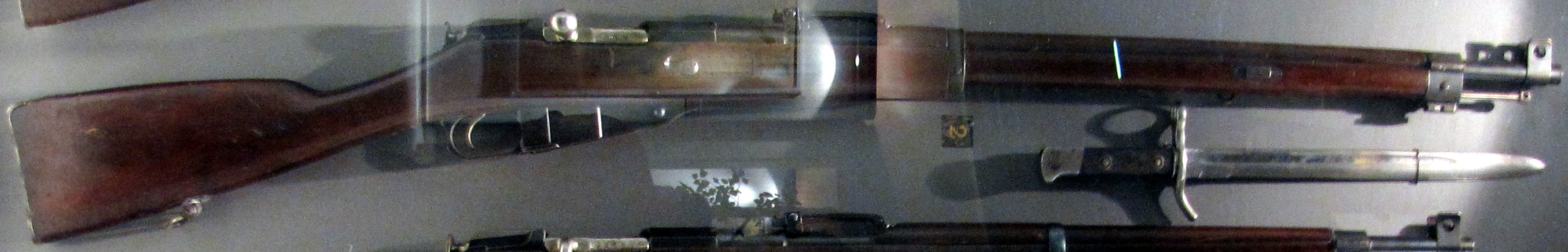
Finnish Army Model 27

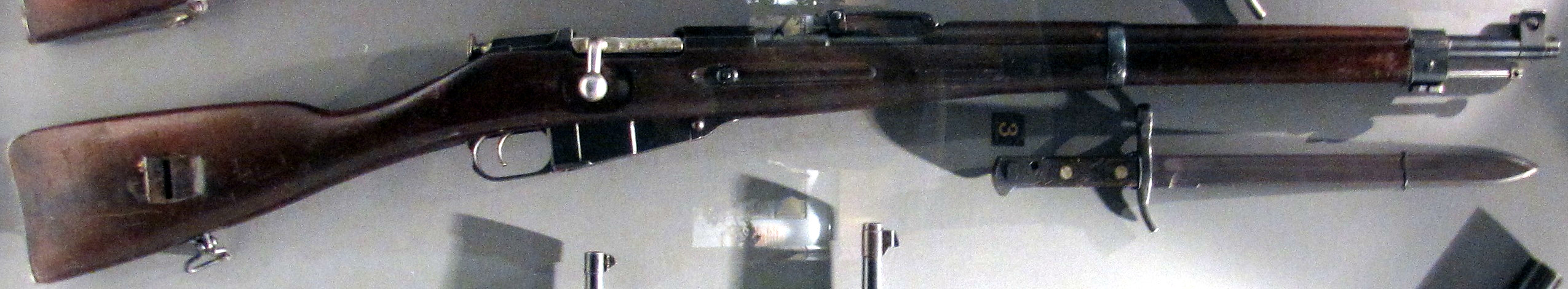
Finnish Army Model 27rv

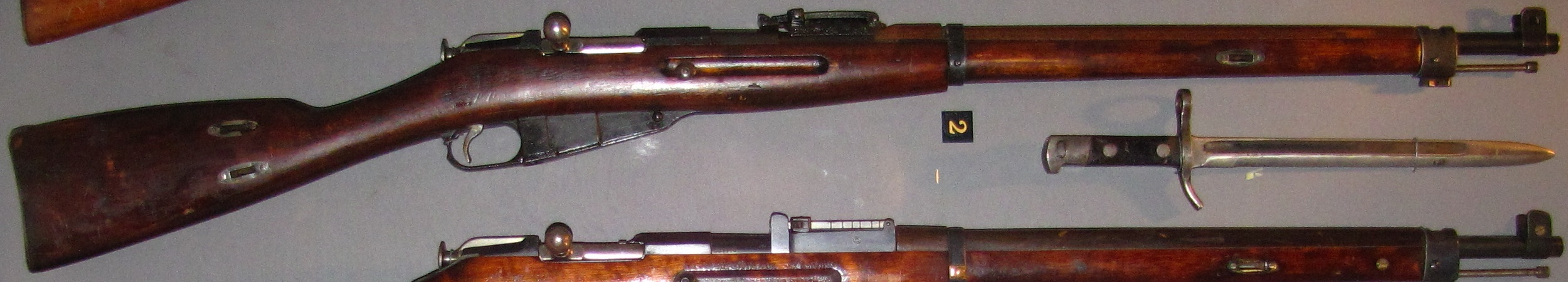
Civil GuardModel 28

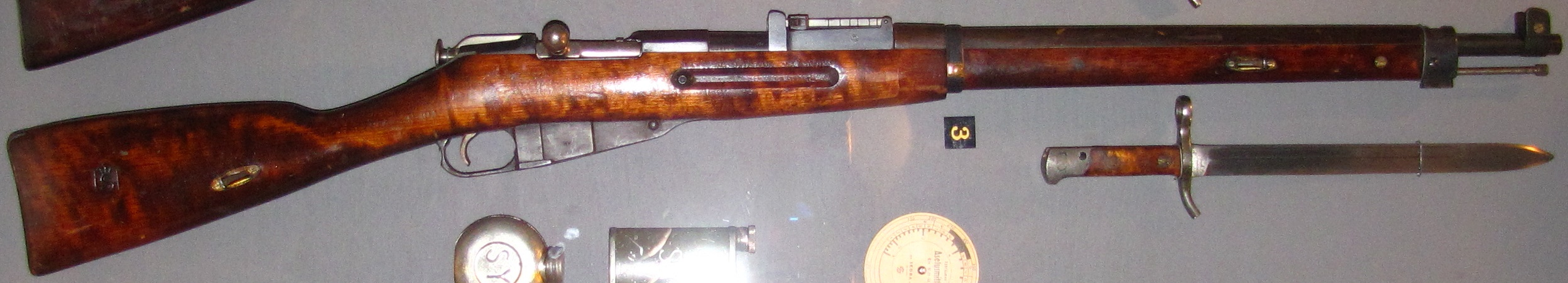
Civil Guard Model 28–30

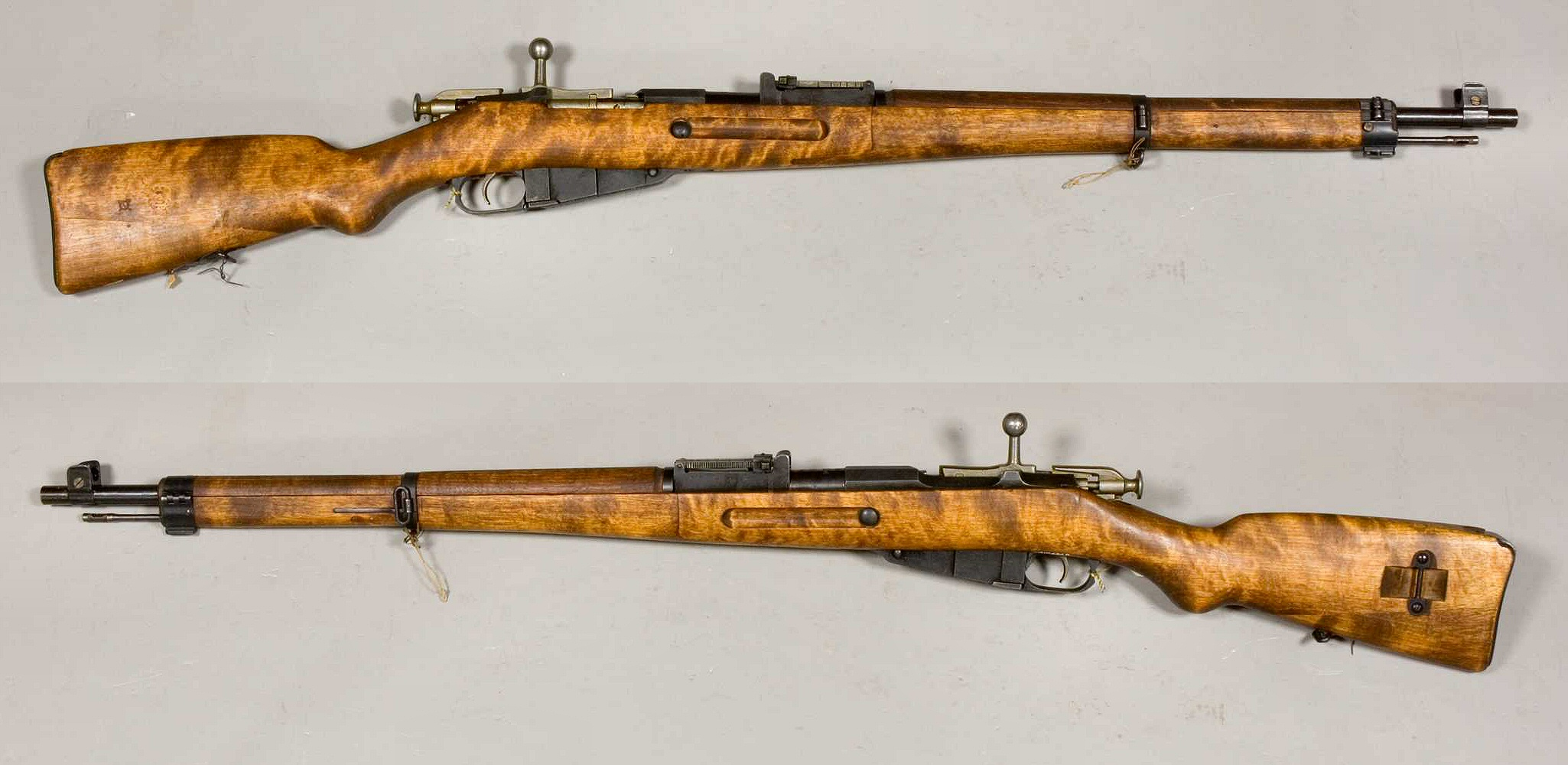
M/39 rifle

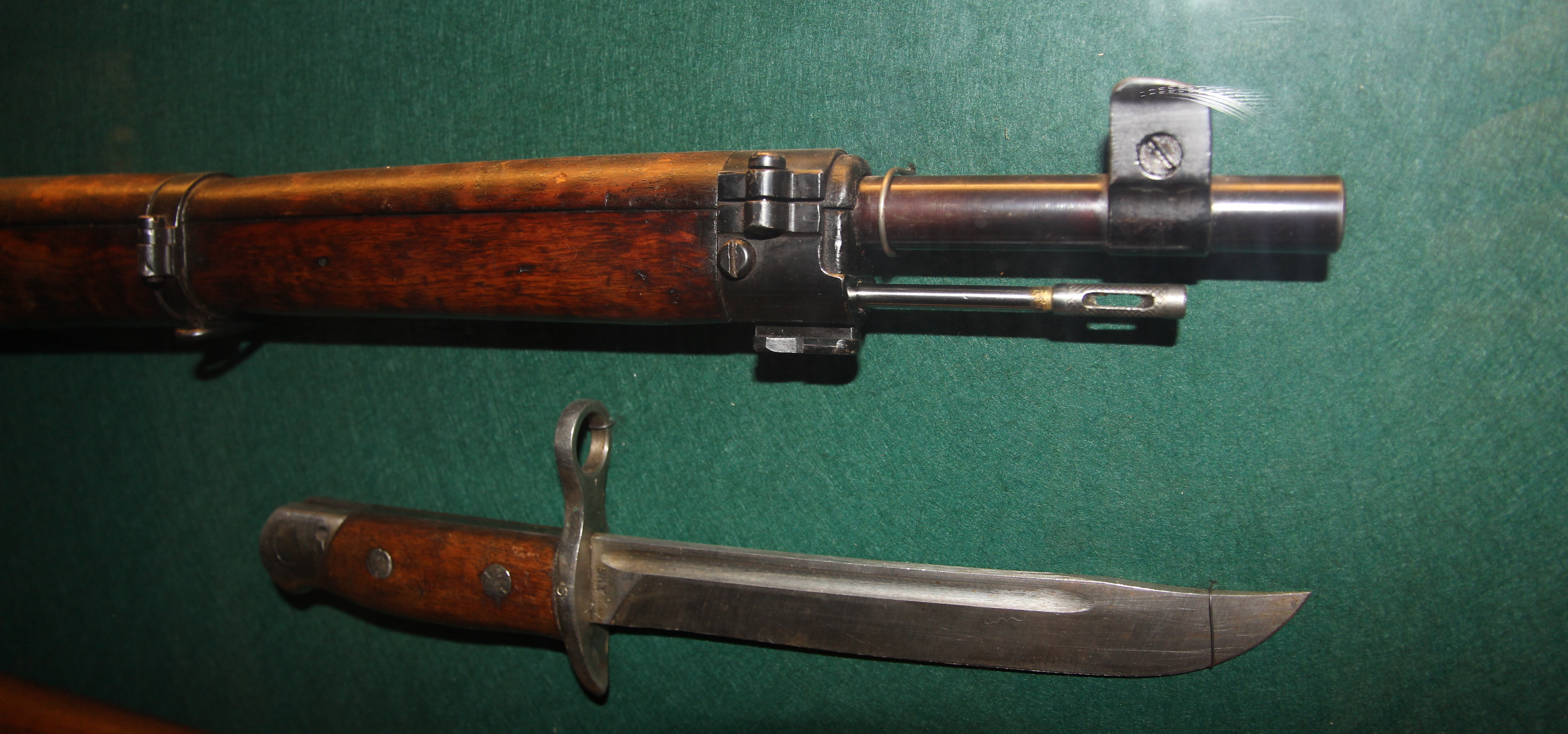
Civil Guard M/39 bayonet

Most Finnish rifles were assembled by SAKO, Tikkakoski Oy, or VKT (Valtion Kivääritehdas, State Rifle Factory, after the wars part of Valtion Metallitehtaat (Valmet), State Metalworks). The Finnish cartridge 7.62×53mmR is a slightly modified variation of the Russian 7.62×54mmR, and is considered interchangeable with 54R. However, the older version of the Finnish military cartridge was loaded with the S-type bullet that had nominal diameter of .308. In 1936 the Finnish Army fielded a new standard service cartridge intended for both machine guns and rifles. This new cartridge was loaded with a new bullet designed in 1934–the D-166, which had a nominal diameter of .310. The new service rifle m/39 was designed from the start around the D-166, thus it had nominal barrel diameter of .310.

Handloaded cartridges for Finnish rifles should however use a 0.308-inch (7.8 mm) bullet for use with other Finnish Mosin–Nagant variants instead of the 0.310-inch (7.9 mm) one which gives best results in M/39, Soviet and most of other Mosin–Nagant rifles.

- M/91: When Finland achieved independence from Russia, over 190,000 Model 1891 infantry rifles were already stockpiled in the ex-Russian military depots within Finland. As a result, the rifle was adopted as the standard Finnish Army weapon, and surplus Mosin–Nagants were purchased from other European nations which had captured them during World War I. These rifles were overhauled to meet Finnish Army standards and designated M/91. In the mid-1920s Tikkakoski made new barrels for m/91s. Later starting in 1940, Tikkakoski and VKT began production of new M/91 rifles. VKT production ceased in 1942 in favor of the newer M/39 rifle, but Tikkakoski production continued through 1944. The M/91 was the most widely issued Finnish rifle in both the Winter War and the Continuation War.
- M/91rv: A cavalry rifle built from former Russian Model 1891 Dragoon rifles, modified with a sling slot based on the German Karabiner 98a. The original Russian sling slots were also retained.
- M/24: The "Lotta Rifle", the Model 24 or Model 1891/24 was the first large-scale Mosin–Nagant upgrade project undertaken by the Finnish Suojeluskunta (Civil Guard), and there were, in fact three separate variations of the rifle. Barrels were produced by SIG (Schweizerische Industrie Gesellschaft) and by a German consortium. Swiss-produced barrels could be found in both standard Mosin–Nagant 1891 contour and in a heavier contour designed for improved accuracy, while all German-produced barrels were heavy weight barrels. The initial contract for the SIG-produced barrels was let on April 10, 1923, and was for 3,000 new barrels produced with the original Model 1891 barrel contour. A subsequent contract for 5,000 additional heavier barrels, stepped at the muzzle end to accept the standard Mosin–Nagant bayonet, was let the next year. The German contracts, starting in 1924 and running to 1926, were all for the heavier, stepped barrels with two contracts: one for 5,000 barrels and a second for 8,000 barrels. The German-made barrels are marked Bohler-Stahl on the under side of the chamber. All Model 24s are marked with the Civil Guard logo of three fir tree sprigs over a capital "S". All Model 24s are equipped with a coil spring around the trigger pin to improve the trigger pull and thus the accuracy of the rifle. The Model 24 was called the Lotta's Rifle (Lottakivääri) after the women's auxiliary of the Civil Guard, known as the Lotta Svärd which was instrumental in raising funds to purchase and repair or refurbish some 10,000 rifles.
- M/27: The Model 27 was the Finnish Army's first almost complete reworking of the Model 1891, it was nicknamed Pystykorva ("spitz") for the front sight protector's resemblance to the upright ears of a spitz dog. The receiver and magazine of the 1891 were retained, but a new shorter-length heavy-weight barrel at 685 mm (27.0 in) was fitted. The sights were modified. The receivers and bolts were modified with "wings" being fitted to the bolt connecting bars that fit into slots machined into the receivers. The stocks were initially produced by cutting down 1891 stocks and opening up the barrel channels to accommodate the heavier barrel. New barrel bands and nose caps were fitted and a new bayonet was issued. The modified stocks proved to be weak, breaking when soldiers practiced bayonet fighting or firing with the bayonet fitted. These and other problems resulted in a slow-down of production in the mid-1930s while solutions to problems were engineered and existing stocks of rifles were modified. Produced from mid-1927 to 1940, the Model 27 was the Finnish Army's main battle rifle in the Winter War.
- M/27rv: A cavalry carbine version of the M27 (rv is short for ratsuväki, lit. 'mounted force'), 2217 were made, and were assigned to the most elite Finnish cavalry units. As a result of their heavy use, nearly half were lost over the course of the Winter and Continuation Wars. Most of the surviving examples were deemed beyond repair and scrapped, with slightly over 300 still existing. This makes it the rarest of all Finnish Mosin–Nagant models.
- M/28: A variant designed by the White Guard. The M/28 differs from the Army's M/27 primarily in the barrel band design, which is a single piece compared to the M/27's hinged band, and an improved trigger design. Barrels for the M/28 were initially purchased from SIG, and later from Tikkakoski and SAKO.
- M/28–30: An upgraded version of the M/28. The most noticeable modification is the new rear sight design. The same sight was used in following M/39 rifle only exception being "1.5" marking for closest range to clarify it for users. According to micrometer measurements and comparison to modern Lapua D46/47 bullet radar trajectory data, markings are matched to Finnish Lapua D46/D46 bullet surprisingly accurately through whole adjustment range between 150 m and 2000 m.
  The trigger was also improved by adding coil spring to minimize very long pre-travel. Following M/39 does not have this improvement. The magazine was also modified to prevent jamming. Magazines were stamped with "HV" (häiriövapaa, lit. 'jam free') letters in right side of rifle. Later M/39 uses identical design, but without the "HV" stamp. M/28–30 also have metal sleeve in fore-end of handguard, to reduce barrel harmonics change and to make barrel-stock contact more constant between shots and/or during environmental changes such as moisture and temperature. Later M/39 does not have this upgrade.
  In addition to its military usage, approximately 440 M/28–30 rifles were manufactured by SAKO for use in the 1937 World Shooting Championships in Helsinki.
  M/28–30 model, serial number 60974, was also used by Simo Häyhä, a well-known Finnish sniper. M/28–30 was used as Civil Guards competition rifle before World War II, as was the case with Simo Häyhä's personal rifle. Therefore, rifles were built very well, with highest grade barrels available and carefully matched headspace. Häyhä's rifle was still at PKarPr (Northern Karelia Brigade) museum in 2002, then moved to an unknown place by the Finnish Army.
- M/91–35: A model proposed by the Finnish Army to replace both its M/27 and the White Guard's M/28 and M/28–30 rifles. The White Guard strongly objected to this plan, considering the M91/35 to have poor accuracy and excessive muzzle flash. It was never adopted, instead being supplanted by the M/39.
- M/39: nicknamed Ukko-Pekka after the former President Pehr Evind Svinhufvud, a compromise between the Army and White Guard, adopted so as to standardize Mosin–Nagant production. The M/39 was derived largely from the M/28–30, but included some alterations proposed by the Army. The M/39 also incorporated a semi-pistol grip into the stock, though some early examples used typical Mosin–Nagant straight stocks. Only 10 rifles were completed by the end of the Winter War, but 96,800 were produced after the Winter War and used in the Continuation War. Small numbers were assembled from leftover parts in the late 1960s through 1973, bringing the total production to approximately 102,000.
- M/30: Tikkakoski produced improved, high-quality Model 1891/30 rifles in 1943 and 1944, designated M/30, using new barrels and parts from some of the almost 125,000 1891/30s captured in the Winter and Continuation Wars as well as 57,000 rifles bought from the Germans in 1944 (most of which were only suitable for use as parts donors). They were produced with both one- and two-piece stocks and either Soviet globe or Finnish blade foresights.
- M/56: An experimental 7.62×39mm version.
- M/28–57: A military target rifle for sporting purposes with diopter sights, built in two variants from existing accurate M/28–30 rifles, a CISM 300 m standard rifle version, and a biathlon version with a purpose made stock, designated as M/28–57 H.
- M/27–66 A military target rifle for CISM 300 m standard rifle competition, which used existing receivers, bolts and triggers from M/27, but had the receiver walls reinforced, some bolt parts modified, new barrels and new target rifle stocks from walnut as well as diopter sights installed. Modification of the rifles was made by Valmet. Some were also equipped with scope bases to be used as sniper rifles, but without any further modifications from the standard model.
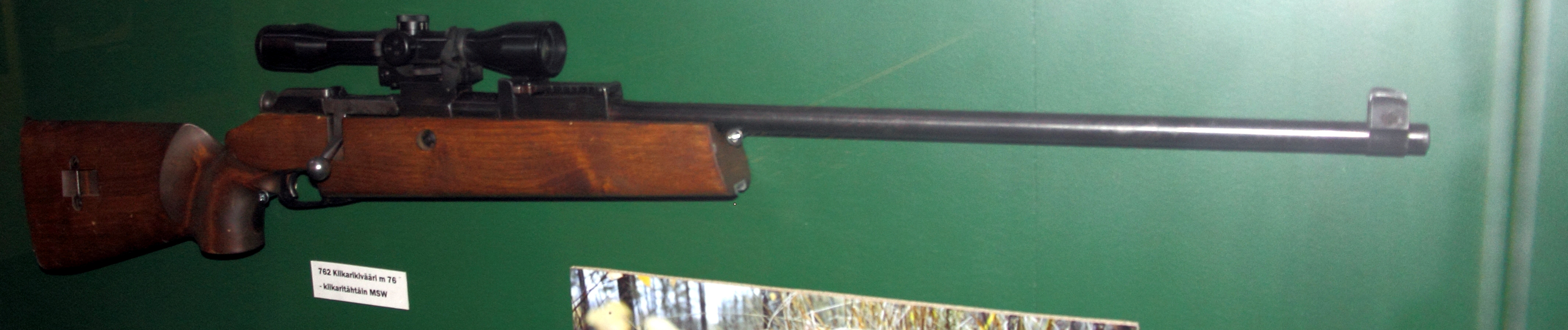
  M/28–76 in sniper rifle configuration
- M/28–76: A dual purpose sniper rifle and target rifle for CISM 300 m standard rifle competition. They were modified from existing M/28–30 and M/28–57 rifles, using the M/28–30 barrel and sights (often with new barrels, but sometimes original from M/28–30) and new birch wood stocks of the same profile as the M/27–66. The target rifle version had a diopter rear sight added and a modified front sight, while the sniper rifle version had a scope base. Modification work for the rifles was carried out by Finnish Defence Forces Asevarikko 1 ('Arsenal 1') in Kuopio.
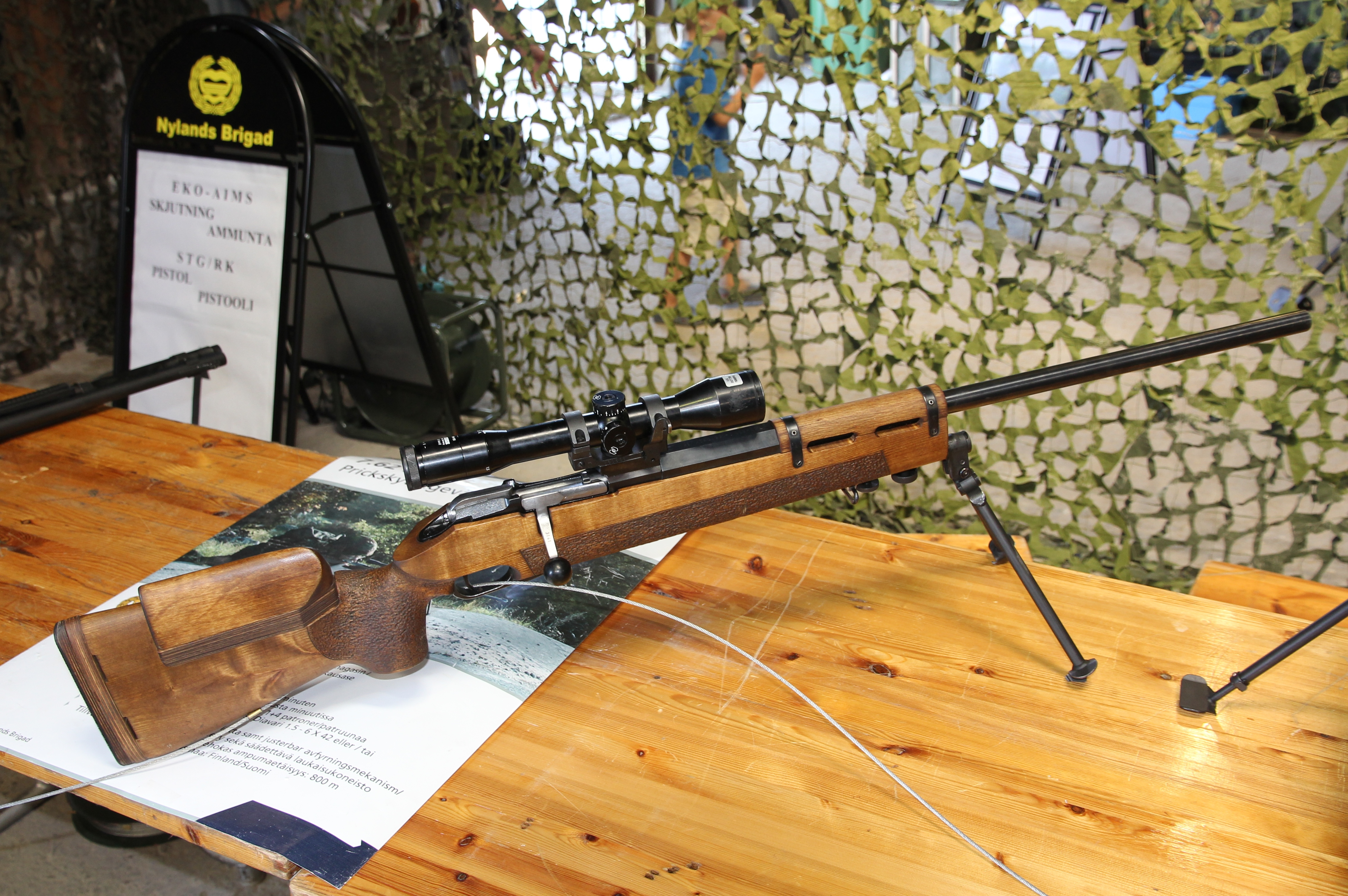
  7.62 TKIV 85 sniper rifle
- M/85: A more comprehensive modernisation based on the Mosin-Nagant action, which features an aluminium bedding block between the stock and the barreled action, attached to the stem of the barrel, while letting the receiver and further barrel float free of the stock. In addition to the changes to the stock, an entirely new trigger pack was designed and the lock time was shortened by removing the safety from the striker assembly of the bolt. The M/85 was built in two variants, the TKIV 85 sniper rifle, and a target rifle for CISM 300 m standard rifle competition: the sniper rifle features a heavy barrel without iron sights and a birch wood stock with an adjustable cheek rest, a bipod and an enclosed fore-end with the upper handguard lifted off the barrel to free-float the barrel past the bedding block, whereas the target rifle features a lighter barrel, diopter sights and a walnut stock without the upper handguard. Although, for possible use in war, a spare sniper version stock was supplied with every target rifle. Modification of existing parts (receiver and bolt assembly) as well as production of new metal parts was carried out by Valmet, and the stocks were made and rifles assembled by FDF Asevarikko 1.

=== Czechoslovakia ===
- VZ91/38 carbine: Very similar to the M91/59, it is an M38-style carbine produced by cutting down Model 1891 infantry, dragoon, and Cossack rifles. Few of these carbines exist, and the reason for their creation remains unclear. Like the M44, they have a bayonet groove cut into the right side of the stock, despite there being no evidence that the VZ91/38 design ever included a bayonet. The front sight features a wide base similar to post World War II M44s.
- Vz. 54 sniper rifle: Based on the M1891/30, although it has the appearance of a modern sporting firearm. The VZ54 utilizes a Czech-made 2.5× magnification scope, as well as a unique rear sight. It also borrows some features from the Mauser design, such as locking screws and a K98k-style front sight hood.
- VZ54/91 sniper rifle: Updated version of the VZ54 sniper rifle. The VZ54/91 utilizes an adjustable biathlon style stock with fully adjustable comb and butt plate. A rail beneath the forearm accepts adjustable sling swivels as well as a bipod. A Soviet manufactured PSO-1 scope also used on the SVD Dragunov sniper rifle is mounted on a side plate. It retains the front and rear sights of the VZ54.

=== China ===
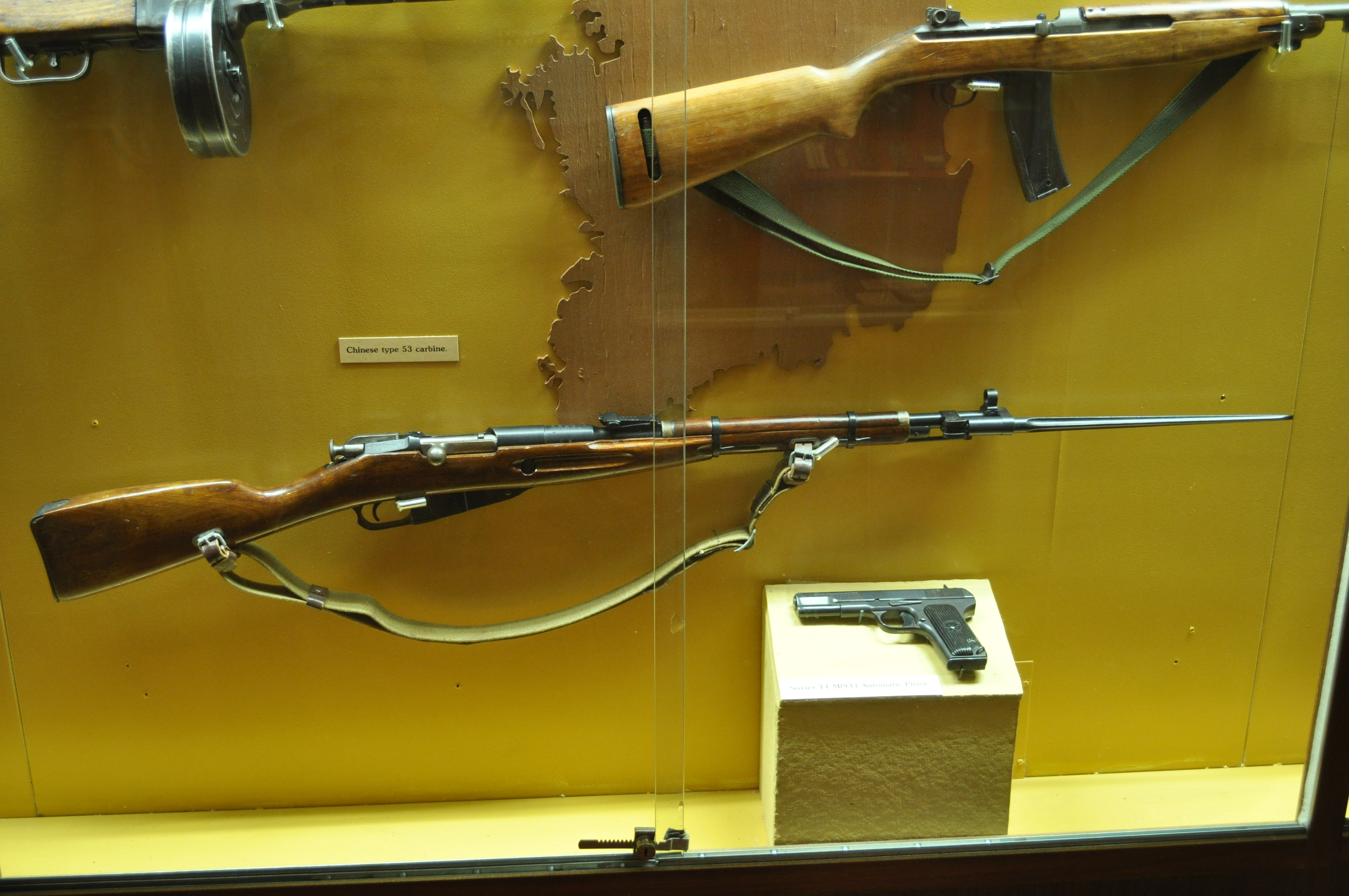
A Chinese Type 53 carbine captured by US forces in Korea

- Type 53: A license-built version of the post-war Soviet M1944 carbine. As many of the carbines imported to the United States are constructed of both local Chinese parts and surplus Soviet parts, there is much debate as to when this mixture occurred. Type 53s are found both with and without the permanently attached folding bayonet, though the former is far more common. The Chinese Type 53 carbine saw extensive service with the People's Liberation Army from 1953 until the late 1950s/early 1960s when the PLA went over to the Chinese Type 56 carbine and the Chinese Type 56 assault rifle. Many Type 53 carbines were given to the People's Militia in China and to North Vietnam (with many carbines ending up in the hands of the National Liberation Front in South Vietnam) and to the Khmer Rouge in Cambodia during the 1960s and 1970s. The People's Militia used the Type 53 until 1982 when they were replaced with modern weapons. There is some evidence that the Type 53 carbine saw extensive use in the hands of the People's Militia during the years of the Great Leap Forward and the Cultural Revolution (with many members of the Red Guards being armed and trained by both the People's Militia and the PLA during the Cultural Revolution). A significant number of Type 53 carbines were given to Albania and a few African countries as military aid by the Chinese during the 1960s. Some of these carbines appeared in the hands of the Kosovo Liberation Army during the late 1990s.
- T53 Single Shot Initial Bullet Speed Testing Carbine: This very rare variant in 7.62×39 was a purposely built single shot carbine chambered for the testing the 7.62×39 cartridge. The only known examples of this carbine have a barrel shank marking of 1960.11, indicating it was made in the November 1960 time frame. There are only two known examples of these carbines that were exported out of China to the USA. The carbine has a blued finish, 20.5" barrel, hooded post front sight, fixed rear sight, straight bolt handle, smooth wood handguard, straight grip shoulder stock with finger groove forend and smooth metal butt plate. The 7.62×39 cartridge is manually loaded into the chamber. The bolt is a standard Mosin–Nagant bolt with modified bolt head to center cartridge in chamber.

=== Hungary ===
- Mosin–Nagant Model 1948 Infantry Rifle Gyalogsági Puska, 48.M (48.Minta): Produced by the FÉG (Fémáru- Fegyver- és Gépgyár Rt.) plant in Budapest, these high-quality versions of the Soviet Model 1891/30 were produced from 1949 to possibly as late as 1955. They are characterized by a high-quality finish and the marking of all parts with the "02" stamp.
- Fémaru- Fegyver- és Gépgyár (FÉG) manufactured a M1891 sniper version based on the 48 in the 1950s. This model was used extensively by the North Vietnamese Army (NVA) during the Vietnam War.
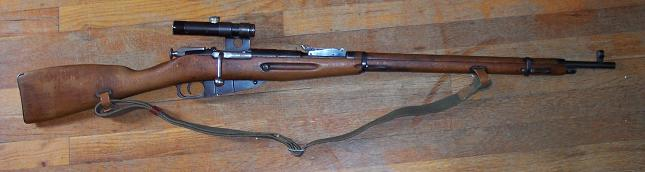
  Hungarian M/52 rifle with PU 3.5× optics
- M/52: A direct copy of the original Soviet Model 1891/30 sniper rifle. Identifying features include:
  - Darkly blued steel and high quality machining.
  - An "02" stamp on every component of the rifle, identifying it as manufactured in Hungary.
- M44 Pattern: Domestically produced version of post war pattern Soviet M44 Carbine marked "02".

=== Romania ===
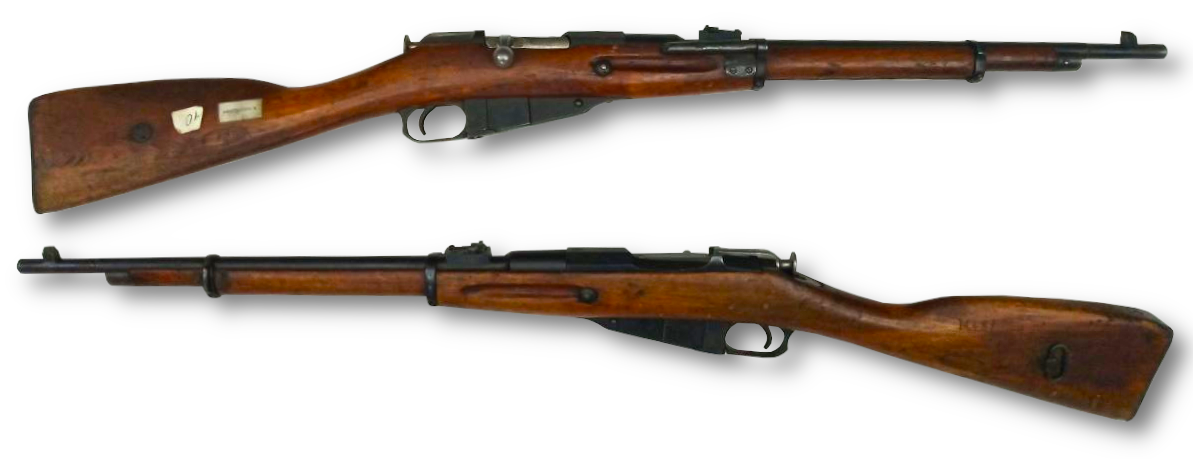
Model 1891 Romanian 1930s carbine conversion

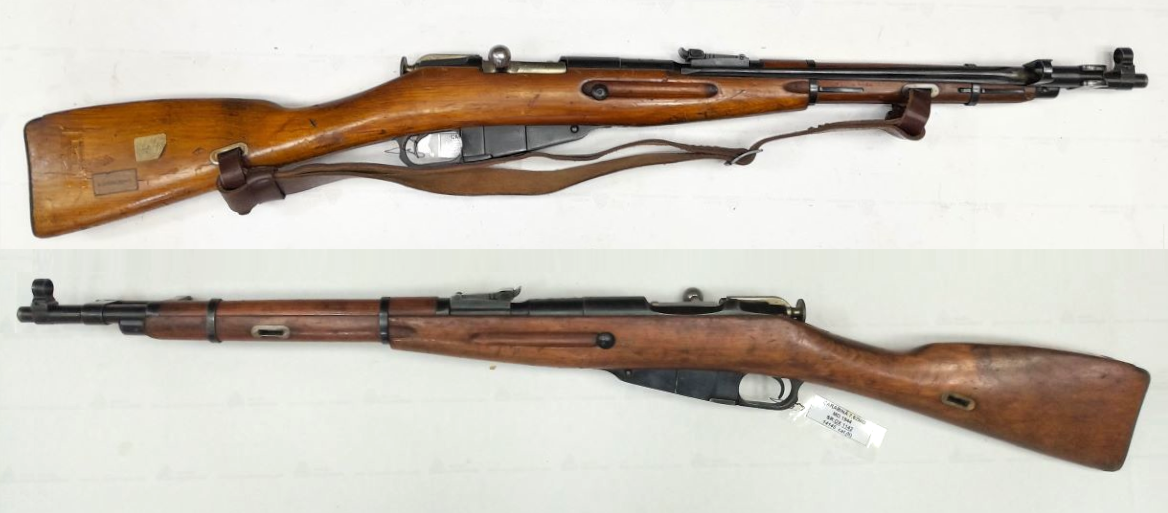
1954 Cugir-produced M44 Mosin

- Triangular shaped markings, some with an arrow inside, on many components of the rifle. Normally three "R"'s surrounded by crossed stalks with leaves pointing outwards are on the top of the breech. Year stamps are quite visible. The trigger assembly is unique in the Romanian 91/30 and is adjustable. It is not interchangeable with other Mosins.
- 1930s Carbine: After the First World War, Romania captured a large number of Mosin-Nagants from Russia. Due to the need for more carbines, an order for 10.000 Mosin-Nagant carbine conversions was placed in the mid to late 1930s. The modifications added to the rifles included bent bolt handles, new rear sights, removal of the original muzzle, shortening of the barrel, as well as adding a metal housing to hold the bayonet. The carbines were kept in service after the Second World War as Romania became part of the Soviet bloc.
- M44 Pattern: Domestically produced version of post war pattern Soviet M44 Carbine during the years 1953 to 1955. Variances to the Soviet pattern produced minor differences.
- Suppressed M44 Pattern: Domestically produced adaptation of the M44, with a long integral suppressor and an LPS 4×6° TIP2 telescopic sight, same as the one used on the PSL rifle. Only a small number were modified, for use with the USLA – a very small counter-terrorism unit of the Securitate
- M91/30 Pattern: Domestically produced version Soviet pattern M91 during the year 1955. Some of the guns are marked "INSTRUCTIE" and held in reserve for a secondary line of defense in case of invasion. The Instructie mark is typically, but not always, accompanied by a broad red band on the buttstock. Some collectors do not consider these safe to fire, but most appear to be in good working order although well worn and somewhat neglected. The "EXERCITIU" mark is found on rifles that seem to have been used specifically for training purposes only. The "EXERCITIU" rifles are easily recognized by the black paint on the entire butt of the stock. They are not intended to be fired since the firing pin is clipped and many times parts critical to their proper function are missing.

=== Poland ===
- wz. 91/98/23: Conversion to the 7.92mm×57 Mauser cartridge, with a magazine modified to feed rimless cartridges. It used the original Russian spike bayonet.
- wz. 91/98/25: Conversion to the 7.92mm×57 Mauser cartridge, with a magazine modified to feed rimless cartridges and a bayonet mounting bar to allow the use of Mauser 1898 bayonets.
- wz. 91/98/26: Conversion to the 7.92mm×57 Mauser cartridge, with a magazine modified to feed rimless cartridges and a bayonet mounting bar to allow the use of Mauser 1898 bayonets. It has a modified two-piece ejector/interrupter similar to Mauser pattern rifles.
- wz. 44: Domestically produced version of post war pattern Soviet M44 carbine, marked with the Polish "circle 11".
- wz. 48: A Polish single shot military trainer modeled in the image of the Mosin–Nagant M38 carbine. Produced from 1948 until 1960, the wz48 was used to train Czech and Polish military cadets. It is chambered in .22 Long Rifle.

=== United States ===
- Russian three-line rifle, caliber 7.62mm (.30 inches): Due to the desperate shortage of arms and the shortcomings of a still-developing domestic industry, the Russian government ordered 1.5 million M1891 infantry rifles from Remington Arms and another 1.8 million from New England Westinghouse in the United States. Most of these rifles were not delivered before the outbreak of the October Revolution and the subsequent signing of the Treaty of Brest-Litovsk which ended hostilities between the Central Powers and Soviet Russia. When the Bolsheviks formed a new government, they defaulted on the Imperial Russian contracts with the American arsenals, with the result that New England Westinghouse and Remington were stuck with hundreds of thousands of Mosin–Nagants. The US government bought up the remaining stocks, saving Remington and Westinghouse from bankruptcy. The rifles in Great Britain armed the US and British expeditionary forces sent to North Russia in 1918 and 1919. The rifles still in the US ended up being primarily used as training firearms for the US Army. Some were used to equip US National Guard, SATC and ROTC units. Collectors have taken to calling these rifles, "U.S. Magazine Rifle, 7.62mm, Model of 1916", though no official source for this designation has ever been cited. Ordnance documents refer to the rifles as "Russian three-line rifle, caliber 7.62mm (.30 inches)". In 1917, 50,000 of these rifles were sent via Vladivostok to equip the Czechoslovak Legions in Siberia to aid in their attempt to secure passage to France. During the interwar period, the rifles which had been taken over by the US military were sold to private citizens in the United States by the Director of Civilian Marksmanship, the predecessor agency to the current Civilian Marksmanship Program. They were sold for the sum of $3.00 each (equivalent to $75 in 2025). If unaltered to chamber the US standard .30-06 Springfield rimless cartridge, these rifles are prized by collectors because they do not have the import marks required by law to be stamped or engraved on military surplus firearms brought into the United States from other countries

=== Ukraine ===
- VM MP-UOS: In 2015, the Ukrainian state-owned Ukroboronservice developed a modernized M1891/30 sniper rifle. It has an aluminum alloy and polymer composite stock, detachable magazine, the Picatinny rail for mounting optical sights, a folding telescopic bipod, and can be fitted with a muzzle brake or suppressor. The prototype was demonstrated on 13 November 2015. On 18 March 2016, ten rifles were delivered for testing to the Sniper Training Center of the National Guard of Ukraine.
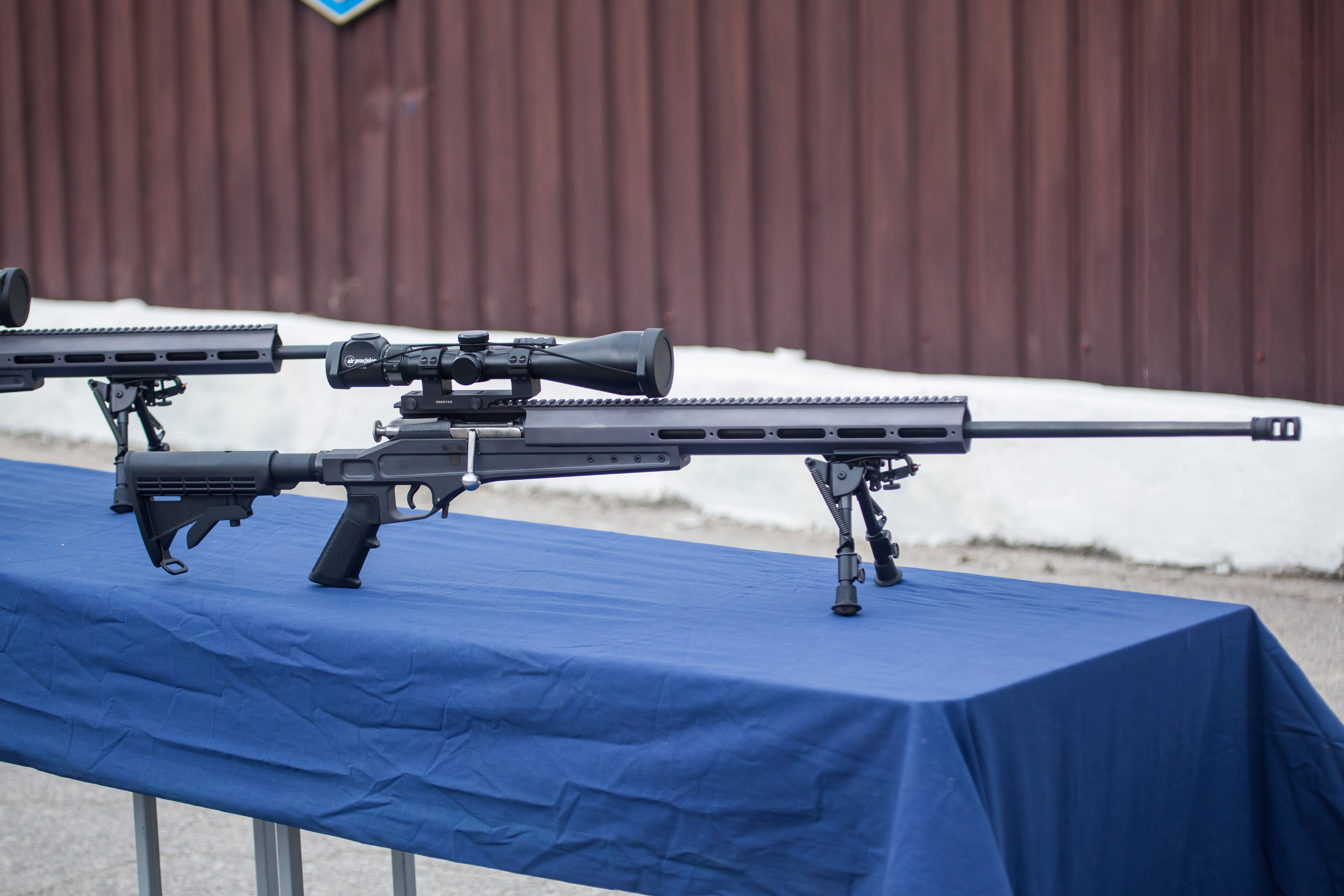
VM MP-UOS, equipped with the muzzle brake. The characteristic bolt of the Mosin–Nagant can be seen.

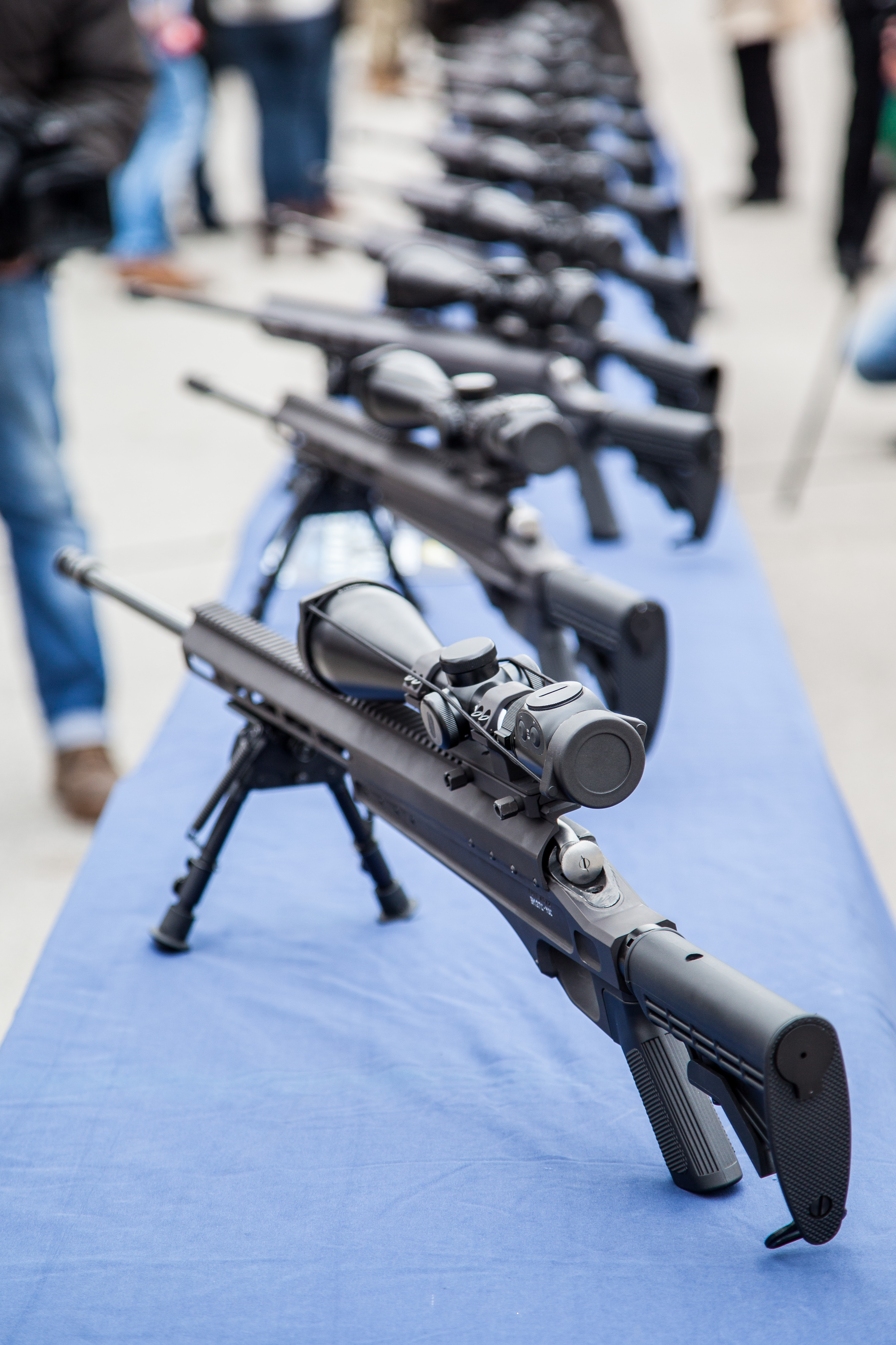
Left side.

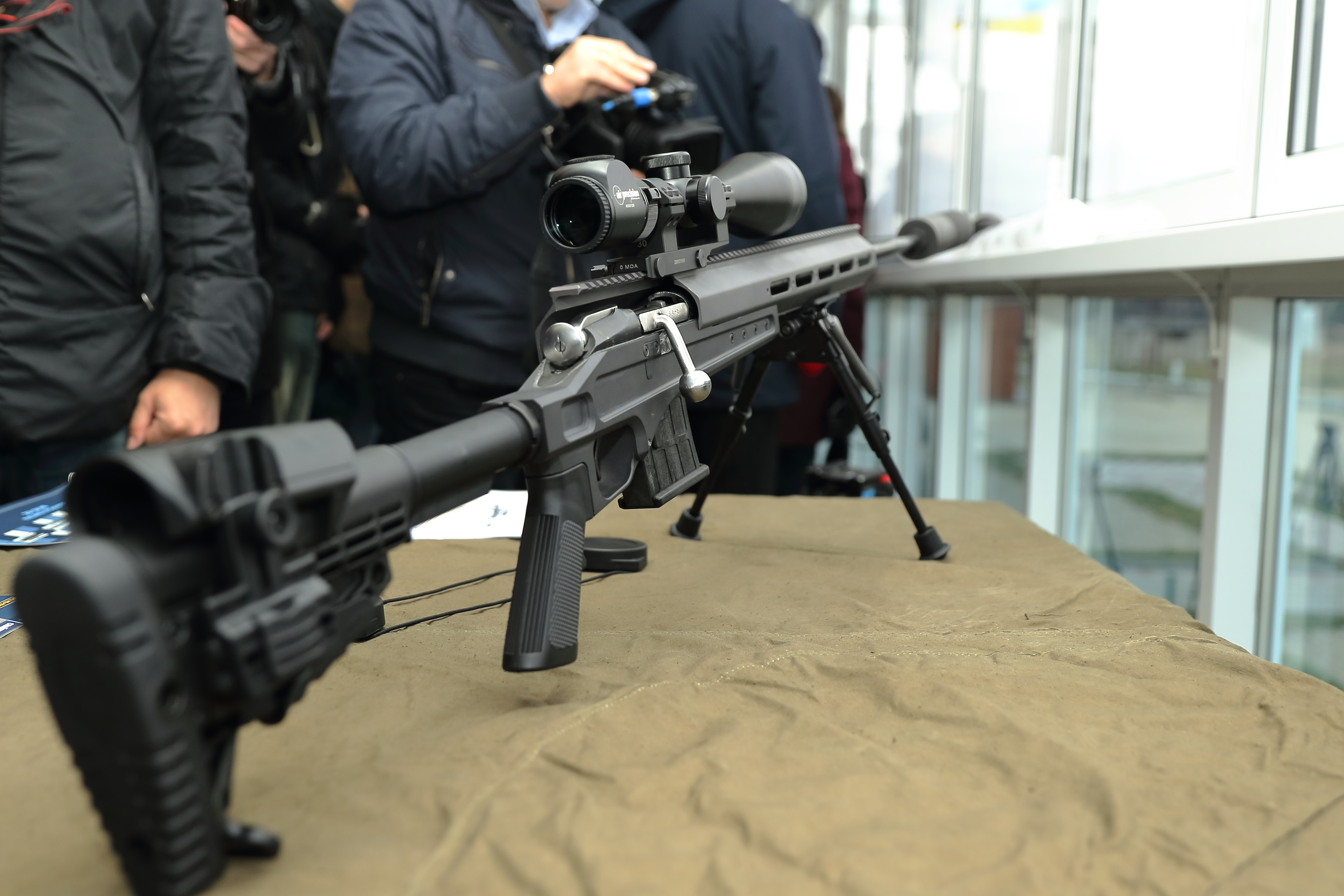
Equipped with a suppressor and detachable magazine.

== Civilian use ==
Mosin–Nagants have been exported from Finland since the 1960s as its military modernized and decommissioned the rifles. Most of these have ended up as inexpensive surplus for Western nations.

In the USSR surplus military carbines (without bayonet) were sold as civilian hunting weapons. Also, the Mosin–Nagant action has been used to produce a limited number of commercial rifles, the most famous are the Vostok brand target rifles exported in Europe in the 1960s and 1970s chambered in the standard 7.62×54mmR round and in 6.5×54mmR, a necked-down version of the original cartridge designed for long range target shooting. Rifles in 6.5×54mmR use a necked-down 7.62×54mmR cartridge and were the standard rifle of the USSR's Olympic biathlon team until the International Olympic Committee revised the rules of the event to reduce the range to 50 meters and required all competitors to use rifles chambered in .22 LR.

A number of the Model 1891s produced by New England Westinghouse and Remington were sold to private citizens in the United States by the U.S. government through the Director of Civilian Marksmanship Program in the interwar period. Many of these American-made Mosin–Nagants were rechambered by wholesalers to the American .30-06 Springfield cartridge.

With the fall of the Iron Curtain, a large quantity of Mosin–Nagants have found their way onto markets outside of Russia as collectibles and hunting rifles. Due to the large surplus created by the Soviet small arms industry during World War II and the tendency of the former Soviet Union to retain and store large quantities of old but well-preserved surplus (long after other nations' militaries divested themselves of similar vintage materials), these rifles (mostly M1891/30 rifles and M1944 carbines) are inexpensive compared to other surplus arms of the same era.

== Users ==
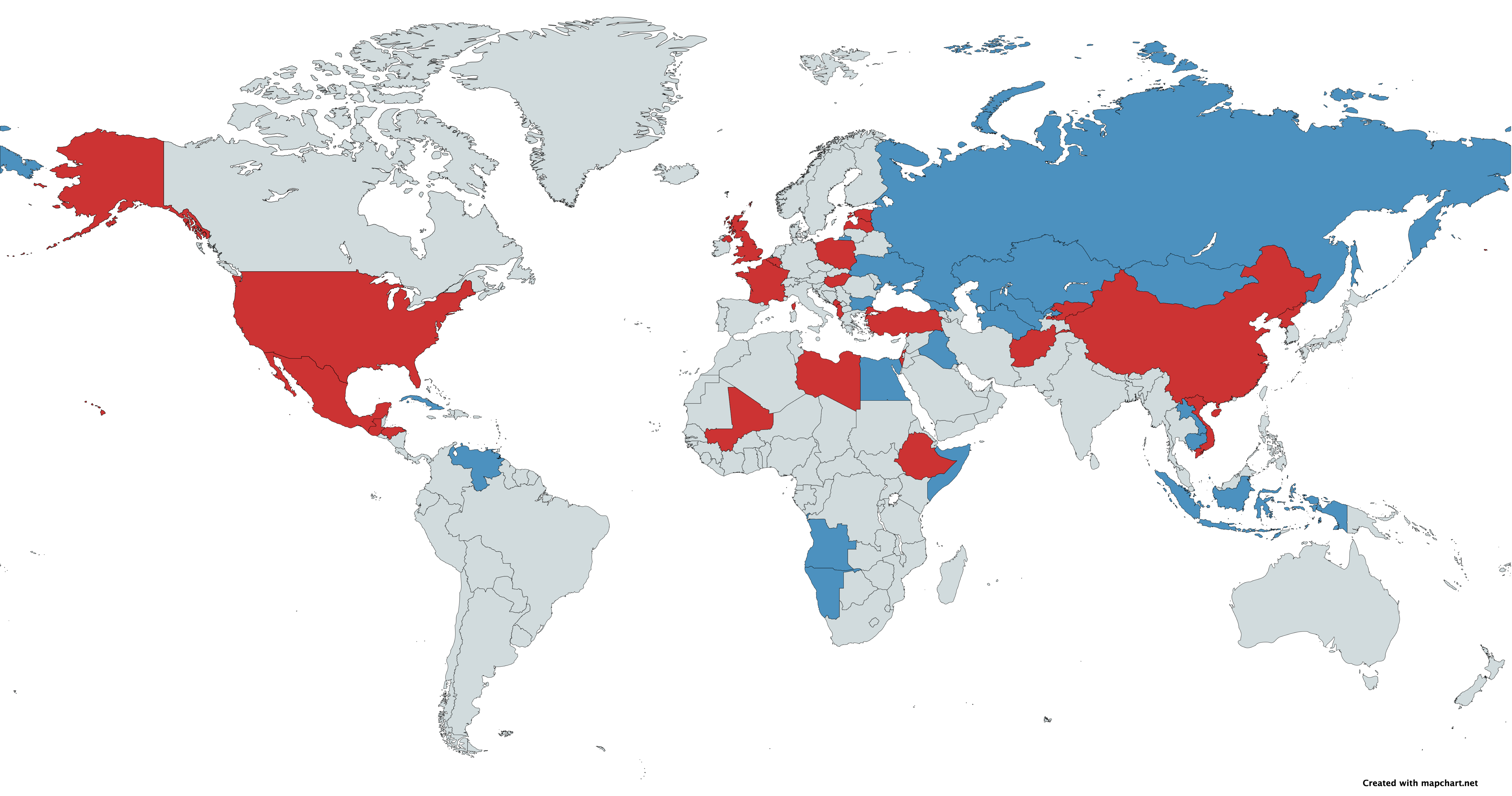
A map with current users of the Mosin–Nagant in blue and former users in red.

=== Current users ===
- Algeria
- Angola: Acquired from the People's Republic of China.
- Australia
- Bahrain
- Bangladesh
- Barbados
- Belarus
- Bolivia
- Bosnia and Herzegovina
- Botswana
- Brazil
- Bulgaria: The first M1891s were received from the Russian Empire in the 1890s. Bulgaria received new rifles in the 1950s. They are still in use by the 101st Alpine Regiment.
- Burkina Faso
- Burundi
- Cambodia: Acquired from the People's Republic of China during the Cold War.
- Chad
- Chile
- Colombia
- Cuba: Acquired from the Soviet Union and the People's Republic of China during the Cold War.
- Cyprus
- Democratic Republic of Congo
- Djibouti
- Dominican Republic
- East Timor
- Egypt: Acquired from the Soviet Union during the Cold War.
- El Salvador
- Eritrea
- Fiji
- Finland: 7.62 TKIV 85 sniper rifles built on the Mosin-Nagant action. Other variants have been removed from service as obsolete and sold off.
- Gabon
- Georgia: Inherited after independence in 1991. It saw use as a sniper rifle in the Armed Forces since 1991 to 2004, replaced by more modern weapons, now used as a ceremonial weapon.
- Ghana
- Greece
- India
- Indonesia: Used by the Marine Corps for training.
- Iran
- Iraq
- Ivory Coast
- Jamaica
- Jordan
- Kazakhstan: Inherited from the Soviet Union after independence.
- Laos: Received from China, North Vietnam, and the Soviet Union.
- Lesotho
- Liberia
- Madagascar
- Malaysia
- Malta
- Mauritania
- Mauritius
- Mongolia
- Morocco
- Mozambique
- Myanmar
- Namibia
- Nepal
- New Zealand
- North Macedonia
- Oman
- Pakistan
- Panama
- Papua New Guinea
- Peru
- Qatar
- Russia: Ceremonial use. Minor use has been seen in the Russo-Ukrainian War.
- Rwanda
- Saudi Arabia
- Senegal
- Seychelles
- Sierra Leone
- Somalia
- South Africa
- South Korea
- South Sudan
- Sri Lanka
- Sudan
- Suriname
- Sweden
- Tanzania
- Thailand
- Togo
- Turkmenistan
- Uganda
- Ukraine (selected security detachments of the Ministry of Internal Affairs): Some were used by pro-government militias during the War in Donbas.
- United Arab Emirates
- Uzbekistan
- Venezuela: Used by the National Bolivarian Militia of Venezuela as their standard-issue rifle.
- Zambia
- Zimbabwe

==== Non-state users ====
- Donetsk People's Republic: Seen being used during the War in Donbas and during the 2022 Russian invasion of Ukraine.
- Hay'at Tahrir al-Sham
- Luhansk People's Republic: Seen being used during the War in Donbas and the 2022 Russian invasion of Ukraine. Mosin–Nagants with PU scopes have also been seen used by snipers.
- Shining Path: Acquired from the People's Republic of China.
- Syrian National Coalition

=== Former users ===
- Islamic Republic of Afghanistan: Acquired sometime in the 1930s by the Afghan Army. The M44 variant was used by the former Afghan Honor Guard.
- Albania
- Belgium
- First Republic of Armenia: Inherited from the Russian Empire upon independence in 1918.
- Austria-Hungary Captured during World War I, sold to Finland in the 1920s.
- Azerbaijan: Inherited from the Soviet Union both during independence in 1918 and after independence in 1991.
- Republic of China (1912–1949): Supplied by the USSR or White Russians during Warlord Era, most to either the NRA or to warlord armies.
- People's Republic of China: Received Mosin variant rifles from the Soviet Union during the 1930s and 1940s. M44 carbines were used by the People's Volunteer Army in the Korean War. A licensed copy of the M44 carbine (Type 53) was produced in China for the PLA and the People's Militia. Also used by the "Forest Protection Police", a predecessor to the People's Armed Police Forestry Corps.
- Czechoslovakia: Briefly used Model 1891s from the Czechoslovak Legions until switching to Mauser variants after the First World War. After the Soviet-backed coup in 1948, Czechoslovakia began converting M91 rifles to M91/38 carbines in the late 1950s. The Czechs developed a Mosin derivative sniper rifle known as the Vz.54 sniper rifle.
- Estonia: Inherited Model 1891s from the Russian Empire after independence. Estonia acquired Finnish variants such as the M28/30 and domestically produced Estonian variants such as the Model 1891/33 and Model 1891/38 until Soviet annexation.
- Ethiopia: In 1912, despite the protests of Russia, several thousand captured Russian rifles were purchased by the Ethiopian army from Japan; those were in extremely poor technical condition. received some M44 carbines during the Ogaden War.
- French Third Republic: The Châtellerault arsenal produced 500,000 Model 1891s from 1892 to 1895 under contract to the Russian Empire to speed up Russia's rearmament.
- East Germany: The M44 variant (designated the Karabiner 44) was used by the Grenztruppen and KdA in the 50s and 60s.
- German Empire: Captured during World War I, sold to Finland in the 1920s.
- Nazi Germany: Large stockpiles of Soviet weapons were captured during Operation Barbarossa and designated as the Gewehr 252–256 series.
- Grenada: Type 53s were reported by US Marines after the Invasion of Grenada.
- Guatemala: M91 and M91/30 rifles were supplied by the CIA during the 1954 coup; reportedly they were obtained through Interarmco.
- Honduras: Surplus Mosins converted to 30-06 were bought from the Bannerman firm shortly before WW2.
- Hungary: Produced M91/30s acquired from the Soviet Union from 1950 to 1954 as well as M44 and PU sniper variants. They were used during the Hungarian Revolution of 1956.
- Israel: Used by Haganah.
- Kingdom of Italy: Captured some on the Italian Front of World War I. Received some from Austria-Hungary as war reparations from World War I before they were sold to Finland.
  - Italian resistance: Later used by partisans during the Italian Civil War.
- Empire of Japan: Stockpiles of M1891 rifles were captured from the Imperial Russian Army during the Russo-Japanese War, and from the Red Army during the Japanese intervention in Siberia. Many were converted to single shot training rifles.
- Kosovo Liberation Army: Used the Type 53 rifle.
- Kyrgyzstan: Inherited from the Soviet Union after independence.
- Latvia: Inherited large amounts of Model 1891s from the former Russian Empire after independence. Domestically produced Model 1891/30s in small quantities before the Soviet annexation.
- Libya
- Malayan Communist Party: Small numbers were donated by the Soviet Union.
- Mali: People's Movement for the Liberation of Azawad
- Mexico: 5,000 U.S.-made rifles received after World War I.
- Montenegro: 40,000 bought in 1898–1905, standard rifle during the First Balkan War. Locally known as 'moskovka'.
- North Korea
- Poland
- Kingdom of Romania: Used at the end of World War I. Captured from Soviets during World War II, also received as aid after joining the allies
- Socialist Republic of Romania
- Russian Empire
- Kingdom of Serbia
- Spain: Sent from Mexico and the Soviet Union.
- Soviet Union
- Ottoman Empire: Used between 1914 and the 1940s. It saw action in World War I (captured rifles) and the War of Independence (Soviet-supplied rifles).
- United Kingdom: Used during the Siberian intervention.
- United States: Produced by Remington Arms and New England Westinghouse Company under contract as the 3 line rifle, Model of 1916, initially for Imperial Russian forces. Following the fall of the Tsar, the remaining rifles armed the National Guard, JROTC, and SATC, as well as American soldiers during the North Russia intervention to prevent rifles from falling into Bolshevik hands.
- Vietnam: Formerly used by the Việt Minh, the Viet Cong, and the North Vietnamese Army. The M44/Type-53 carbines were known as K44 or red stock rifles and a detachable grenade launcher, the AT-44, was designed. The North Vietnamese Army also used the M1891/30 modified as a sniper rifle.
- Yugoslavia

== See also ==
- List of Russian weaponry
