= New England Westinghouse Company =

Former division of Westinghouse Electric

Coordinates: 42°8′24.01″N 72°33′21.05″W

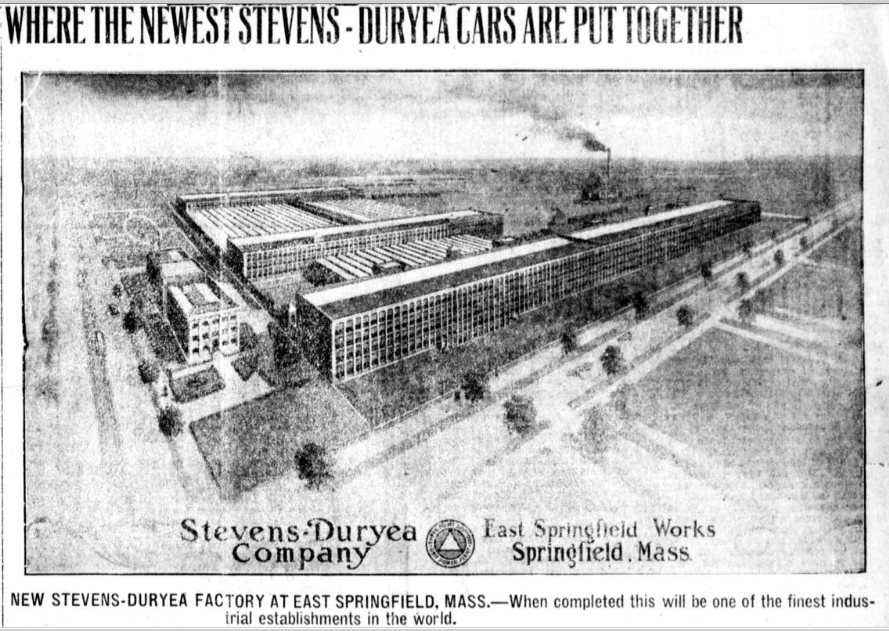
East Springfield Works, during its ownership by Stevens-Duryea

The New England Westinghouse Company is a former division of Westinghouse Electric. It was founded in 1915 in East Springfield, Massachusetts. Its primary purpose was to fulfill a contract to produce 1.8 million Mosin–Nagant rifles for Czar Nicholas II of Russia during World War I. In order to produce the rifles, they purchased the J Stevens Arms & Tool Company in Chicopee Falls, Massachusetts on 28 May 1915 and acquired all its holdings which included firearms and tool manufacturing facilities, and the Stevens-Duryea automobile factory. They sold the tool manufacturing portion of Stevens and shut down production of Stevens-Duryea automobiles and civilian firearms. The remaining Stevens firearms facility was renamed the J Stevens Arms Company, on 1 July 1916, and its machinery was retooled to meet the Mosin–Nagant contract. After some 770,000 rifles had been produced, the Czar was deposed in March 1917. Nonetheless, the Russian Embassy in Washington, D.C. still under the direction of Provisional Government Ambassador Boris Bakhmeteff, made financial arrangements with the U.S. State Department and the U.S. Treasury Department on 20 December 1917 for National City Bank to make payments of $325,000 to the Remington Company for rifles and $2,075,000 to J.P. Morgan in connection with a Westinghouse arms contract.

The company entered hard times and started producing M1918 Browning Automatic Rifles at the former Stevens-Duryea factory that was originally constructed for car manufacturing in 1912. In 1920 they sold the J Stevens Arms Company to Savage Arms but kept the automobile factory for use producing commercial products for Westinghouse Electric. In 1921, the Stevens-Duryea factory was the location of the first broadcasts of WBZ (AM), the first commercial radio station in the United States.

New England Westinghouse was dissolved on 8 October 1926 by the Supreme Judicial Court of Suffolk County, Massachusetts. Westinghouse continued to operate the facility until its closure, with a foundry and knitting company operating at the factory location. The buildings were demolished (with the exception of the Westinghouse office building along Page Blvd.) and the land cleared in 2010, with the eventual goal of placing a mixed development on the site.

In 2009–2011, Ameristar Casinos (now under Pinnacle Entertainment) acquired use of this property for a $910 million resort casino, paying $16 million for the property. However, the proposal was eventually dropped in the face of competition from MGM and Penn National Gaming, who also wanted to build casinos in Springfield. MGM won the rights to build in Springfield, and constructed MGM Springfield on the Connecticut River.

== CRRC railcar assembly plant ==
Changchun Railway Vehicles, now CRRC, later purchased the property for a new $65 million railcar assembly facility. This facility is responsible for the manufacturing and delivery of 252 new Red Line and 152 new Orange line subway cars for the Massachusetts Bay Transportation Authority. On October 21, 2014, the MBTA submitted their recommendation of CNR Changchung Rail to the Massachusetts Department of Transportation. Construction of the new facility began in the fall of 2015. The first new Orange Line train entered revenue service on August 14, 2019; The facility will also build 45 bi-level cars for SEPTA.
