= Vz. 54 =

vz. 54
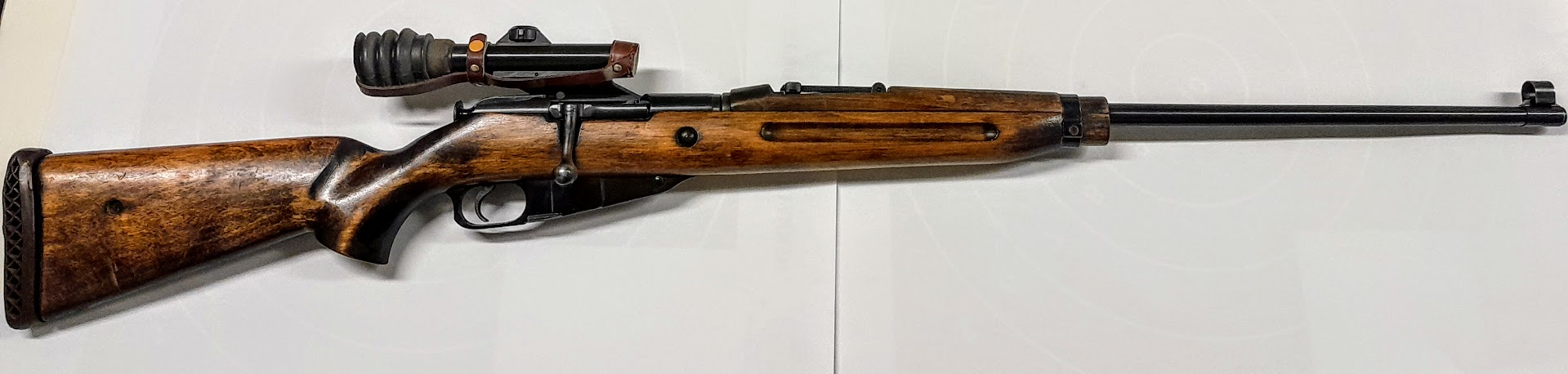
- Type: Bolt-action rifle
- Place of origin: Czechoslovakia, Slovakia, Czech Republic

Service history
- In service: 1954-1990s
- Used by: Czechoslovakia; North Vietnam; East Germany; Police of the Czech Republic
- Wars: Vietnam War

Production history
- Designer: Otakar Galaš / Považské strojírny
- Designed: 1951
- Manufacturer: Czechoslovakia
- Produced: 1951, 1954-1958
- No. built: 5,521
- Variants: vz. 54/91

Specifications
- Mass: 4.63 kg (empty), 4.38 kg (fully equipped)
- Length: 1148 mm

vz. 54 (Czech: Odstřelovací puška vz. 54) is a Czechoslovak bolt-action sniper rifle chambered in 7.62×54mmR.

== Development ==
The sniper rifle was developed in Czechoslovakia between 1949 and 1951. Initially, the ZG 49 sn variant chambered in 7.92×64 mm was tested, but the final decision favored the 7.62×54mmR cartridge. The second prototype was based on the Soviet Mosin-Nagant , from which the action was adopted. Selected bolt parts were optimized and the best barrels were chosen. The stock design incorporated features from pre-war vz. 24 rifle production.

== Design ==
The stock with pistol grip was newly designed; the fore-end is relatively short, exposing the front half of the barrel. It has only one barrel band. The bent bolt handle was purpose-made, unlike the simply cranked ones found on Soviet Mosin sniper rifles. As a result, the stock has a cutout to accommodate the bolt handle.

The primary sight is a fixed Czech Meopta 2.5×6 telescopic sight with only 2.5× magnification (compared to 4× or 3.5× magnification in Soviet PE and PU scopes). The backup iron sights consist of a sliding rear notch adjustable from 50 to 1200 meters, paired with a front post.

== vz. 54/91 ==
In the 1990s, existing police vz. 54 rifles were modernized. They were fitted with new stocks featuring adjustable cheek rests and bipods. The original scopes were replaced with PSO-1 scopes (4× magnification) as used on the SVD.

== Users ==
- Czechoslovak Socialist Republic: Used by Czechoslovak People's Army and police forces. Used by the army until being replaced by the SVD Dragunov in the 1970s.
- Vietnam: Limited use during the Vietnam War. 1,460 rifles sent by Czechoslovakia between 1966 and 1968.
- United States: Few examples captured during the Vietnam War.
- East Germany: Limited use.
- Police of the Czech Republic: vz. 54/91 used by the Rapid Response Unit units in the 1990s.
