= 2020 in Afghanistan =

- Decades: 2000s; 2010s; 2020s
- See also: Other events of 2020; List of years in Afghanistan

Events in the year 2020 in Afghanistan.

== Incumbents ==
- President: Ashraf Ghani
- Chief Executive: Abdullah Abdullah
- Speaker of Wolesi Jirga: Abdul Rauf Ibrahimi
- Speaker of Meshrano Jirga: Fazel Hadi Muslimyar
- First Vice President of Afghanistan: Abdul Rashid Dostum
- Second Vice President of Afghanistan: Sarwar Danish
- First Deputy Chief Executive of Afghanistan: Khyal Mohammad Mohammad Khan
- Second Deputy Chief Executive of Afghanistan: Vacant

== Events ==
=== January ===
- 27 January – A United States Air Force Bombardier Global Express E-11A aircraft crashed in Afghanistan's Dih Yak District, Ghazni Province.
- 29 January – Afghan special forces raided a Taliban compound in Bala Murghab, Badghis Province, freeing 62 hostages. A Taliban attack in Kunduz killed multiple Afghan security forces.

=== February ===
- 6 February – The CASA-1000 project was inaugurated, in a ceremony attended by Afghan President Ashraf Ghani and Pakistani Ambassador to Afghanistan Zahid Nasrullah Khan.
- 7 February – Two senior militants of the anti-Pakistan terrorist group Tehrik-i-Taliban Pakistan - Sheikh Khalid Haqqani and Qari Saif Younis - were found assassinated near the Hotel Inter-Continental Kabul.
- 8 February – Two U.S. Army Special Forces soldiers were killed, and six more were wounded, in an insider attack in Sherzad District, Nangarhar Province.
- 11 February – A suicide bomber killed at least six people near the Marshal Fahim National Defense University in Kabul.
- 15 February – U.S. negotiators and the Taliban agreed on a seven-day "reduction in violence" period, with the ultimate aim of reducing U.S. forces from 12,000 to 8,600 over coming months. U.S. Secretary of Defense Mark Esper said the period was "conditions-based" but would involve suspending a "significant part" of U.S. operations, though no start date had been selected till then. Consultations were scheduled for 21 February between Esper, Secretary of State Mike Pompeo, and Afghan president Ashraf Ghani. The announcement followed an earlier Taliban ultimatum to reply to their proposal for such a reduction, though the Taliban still refused to meet with Afghan government officials in any capacity but as private citizens.
- 18 February – President Ashraf Ghani was formally declared the winner of the 2019 Afghan presidential election, though Abdullah Abdullah disputed the results, and announced his intentions to form his own government.
- 19 February – President Ashraf Ghani and U.S. Special Representative for Afghanistan Reconciliation Zalmay Khalilzad met to discuss U.S. peace negotiations with the Taliban.
- 29 February – The United States and the Taliban sign an agreement that may lead to the end of the war in Afghanistan.

=== March ===
- 6 March – Two ISIL insurgents shot 32 people dead in Kabul.
- 25 March – ISIL attack a gurdwara (Sikh house of worship) in Kabul, killing 25 people.
- 29 March – The Taliban kill six Afghan troops and police officers in Zabul province and five in Baghlan province.
- 30 March – A sticky bomb attached to a vehicle detonated Kabul, wounding four people. The Taliban are to send ten representatives to the U.S. Bagram Airfield, to oversee the release of 5,000 prisoners. Reuters reports 27 security forces and 13 Taliban killed in fighting.

=== May ===
May 2020 Afghanistan attacks

- 1 May – Drowning of Afghan refugees in the Hari River.
- 12 May – A mass shooting in Kabul and a suicide bombing in Nangarhar Province. Unknown attackers killed 24 and injured 16 others, including new-born babies, mothers, and nurses at a maternity hospital in Kabul.
- 14 May – A car bomb was detonated in Gardez, Paktia Province, killing 5 people and wounding 14. Taliban spokesman Zabihullah Mujahid claimed responsibility for the attack.
- 23 May – The Taliban and Afghan government announce a three-day ceasefire beginning on Eid al-Fitr. It is only the third time that a truce has been agreed upon since the conflict began. UN Secretary-General António Guterres welcomed the announcement and urged all parties to embrace the Afghan peace process.

=== June ===
June 2020 Afghanistan attacks

- 6 June – Eleven members of the security forces and four insurgents were killed in Badakhshan Province. Three police officers were killed in a gun battle in Guldara District, Kabul Province.
- 12 June – Four people were killed and another eight injured in a bombing at a Kabul mosque.
- 17 June – Twelve security forces members were killed and five were wounded during a Taliban attack in Aqcha District, Jowzjan Province. Four soldiers were taken hostage in the attack, and five Taliban militants killed. Two security checkpoints in the Aqcha district were hit from different angles by the attackers, in an attempt to take over their control, a spokesman in the Jawzjan province confirmed. However, the actual extent of casualties are yet to be ascertained, as the group behind the attack has not issued a statement yet.
- 29 June – At least 23 people were killed in rocket attacks on a cattle market in Sangin District, Helmand Province. Both the government and the Taliban blamed each other for the attack.

=== July ===
July 2020 Afghanistan attacks

- 13 July – 11 people were killed and several others injured, as a result of a car bomb blast at a government facility in northern Afghanistan's Samangan Province. According to the hospital chief of the province, most of the casualties of the attack were civilians, including children. The deputy governor of the province stated that the insurgents breached the intelligence complex agency after the blast, subsequently engaging in a struggle with the Afghan forces for hours. Officials added that the Taliban claimed responsibility for the attack.
- 23 July – Local officials disclosed that an Air strike was launched by the Afghan forces against Taliban fighters in the western Afghan province of Herat, killing at least 45 people, including civilians. Witnesses claimed that the attack was carried out when several people came out in Herat's Adraskan district to welcome a Taliban fighter that was recently released from jail. Further claims suggest that at least 8 civilians lost their lives in the attack, with several others injured including children. The Afghan defense ministry has assured that it would look into this lethal attack which resulted in civilian casualties.
- 28 July – The Taliban has declared a temporary ceasefire for three days in Afghanistan, ahead of Muslim's holiday for Eid. According to the Washington Times, the Afghan government has accepted the deal, as they have urged their forces to uphold the truce. President Ashraf Ghani has indicated that negotiations could begin next week, which would mark the commencement of the procrastinated peace talks. However, spokesman of the Taliban Zabihullah Mujahid, has maintained that the Taliban would respond if attacked by Afghan forces, despite ordering their fighters to stand-down in order to observe Eid peacefully.

=== August ===
August 2020 Afghanistan attacks

- 2–3 August – The Islamic State of Iraq and the Levant – Khorasan Province (ISKP) group's suicide car bomber and gunmen attacked a prison in Jalalabad Nangarhar Province, in eastern Afghanistan. Beginning on August 2, the battle between soldiers went on for 20 hours. At least 29, including at least 8 ISIS attackers, were killed in the Jalalabad attack, while around 50 were injured. More than 25 prisoners escaped, while around 1,025 inmates, who tried to flee the compound, were recaptured.
- 26 August – Flash floods kill at least 72 people and destroy hundreds of homes in Parwan Province.

=== September ===
September 2020 Afghanistan attacks

- 9 September – Ten people are killed and 31 including First Vice-president Amrullah Saleh are injured in a bombing in Kabul. The Taliban deny responsibility for the attack.
- 12 September – Representatives of the government and the Taliban meet in Qatar to begin peace talks. U.S. Vice-president Mike Pence attends to inauguration in Doha.
- 16 September
  - A bomb kills two people and injures 12 others in Kalafgan District, Takhar Province.
  - A member of the Afghan National Directorate of Security was shot dead and his driver was injured in Kabul.

=== October ===
October 2020 Afghanistan attacks

- 18 October – A car bomb was placed outside a police headquarter in the western province of Ghor. The explosion left 13 civilians dead and more than 120 people wounded.
- 21 October
  - During an application for visas to Pakistan at Jalalabad Stadium, at least twelve women were killed in a human stampede.
  - An Afghan Air Force airstrike against a mosque in Baharak District, Takhar reportedly killed 12 children, though the Ministry of Defense claimed all of those killed were Taliban militants.

=== November ===
November 2020 Afghanistan attacks

- 2 November – Three gunmen stormed the campus of Kabul University killing 32 people and wounding 50 others in the 2020 Kabul University attack.
- 24 November – Around 70 countries and 30 international organizations participate in the United Nations' 2020 Afghanistan Conference, pledging US$3.3 billion to support the Afghani peace process.

== Deaths ==
- 2 June – Munir Mangal, Commander of the Afghan National Police (2010–2016) (b. 1950).
- 26 June – Faqir Nabi, actor (b. 1953).
- 6 October – Najeeb Tarakai, cricketer (b. 1991).

== See also ==
- History of Afghanistan
- Outline of Afghanistan
- Politics of Afghanistan
- Government of Afghanistan
- COVID-19 pandemic in Afghanistan
- 2020s
- 2020s in political history
