= November 2020 Afghanistan attacks =

Multiple attacks launched by insurgents in November 2020

- Part of the War in Afghanistan and Taliban insurgency
- Location: Afghanistan
- Date: November 2020
- Attack type: Bombing; Car bombing Shooting
- Weapons: Bomb; Shotguns
- Deaths: 88
- Injuries: 193
- Perpetrators: Islamic State of Iraq and the Levant – Khorasan Province; Taliban

The November 2020 Afghanistan attacks were multiple attacks launched by insurgents including the Taliban and Islamic State of Iraq and the Levant – Khorasan Province in November 2020. The attacks left at least 88 people dead and more than 193 injured.

== Timeline of the attacks ==
Date	Location	Dead	Injured	Details
1	Herat, Herat Province	3	2	A bombing attack in Herat, Herat Province left at least 3 police dead and another 2 people were injured.
1	Kunduz Province	4	8	At least 4 people were killed and another 8 were injured after a mortar shell hit Kunduz Province.
2	Kabul, Kabul Province	32 (+3)	50	2020 Kabul University attack - At least 32 people were killed and 50 others injured in an attack on Kabul University. The Islamic State of Iraq and the Levant – Khorasan Province claimed responsibility for the attack.
7	Kabul, Kabul Province	3	0	A bomb attached to the vehicle of former TOLO TV presenter Yama Siawash exploded in the morning, killing the journalist and two other civilians while they were inside the car.
8	Baghlan Province	4	6	Multiple attacks left at least 4 soldiers dead and 6 injured in Baghlan Province.
8	Ghazni, Ghazni District, Ghazni Province	8	7	Taliban attacked houses with mortars in Ghazni city, Ghazni Province. The attack left at least 8 people dead and another 7 were injured.
10	Faryab Province	4	20	At least 4 police were killed in car bombing attack and another 20 people were injured.
10	Maidan Wardak Province	1	5	A bomb killed one and 5 others were injured in Maidan Wardak Province.
11	Kabul Province	2	1	A magnetic bomb kills at least 2 police and another was injured in Lab-e-Jar area, Kabul Province.
11	Kabul Province	2	0	At least 2 soldiers were killed in a shooting attack. The attack occurred in Qala-e-Wazir area, Kabul Province.
12	Helmand Province	1	0	A bomb killed a reporter in Helmand Province.
13	Paghman District, Kabul Province	4	5	Car bombing left at least 4 soldiers dead and 5 others were injured in Paghman District, Kabul Province.
17	Jurm District, Badakhshan Province	12	10	Taliban kills at least 12 police and injured 10 others in Jurm District, Badakhshan Province.
21	Kabul	8	31	ISIL claim responsibility for rocket attacks which hit several buildings, including the Iranian embassy, an office and a medical centre.
22	Ghazni	30	24	At least 30 Afghani Security personnel were killed and at least 24 were wounded in a car bombing, but no one has claimed responsibility. The Taliban said they did not, nor did perpetrate the attack.
23	Qalat	4	24	4 civilians were killed, and 24 were injured, 4 critically, by a suicide attack in the Zabul District, Qalat province. No one has claimed responsibility

== See also ==
- 2020 in Afghanistan
- List of Islamist terrorist attacks
- List of mass car bombings
- List of terrorist attacks in Kabul
- List of terrorist incidents in 2020
- List of terrorist incidents linked to ISIL
- May 2020 Afghanistan attacks
- June 2020 Afghanistan attacks
- July 2020 Afghanistan attacks
- August 2020 Afghanistan attacks
- September 2020 Afghanistan attacks
- October 2020 Afghanistan attacks
