= October 2020 Afghanistan attacks =

- Part of the War in Afghanistan and Taliban insurgency
- Location: Afghanistan
- Date: October 2020
- Attack type: Car bombing Shooting; Suicide bombing
- Weapons: Bombs; Guns
- Deaths: 253
- Injuries: 339
- Perpetrators: ISIL; Taliban

The October 2020 Afghanistan attacks were multiple attacks launched by insurgents including the Taliban and Islamic State of Iraq and the Levant – Khorasan Province in October 2020. The attacks left at least 243 people dead and 339 injured. 10 perpetrators were also killed in these attacks.

== Timeline of attacks ==
Date	Location	Dead	Injured	Details
1	Grishk District, Helmand Province	9 (+1)	4	A suicide bombing left at least nine people including four civilians dead in a late-night attack in Grishk District in Helmand Province. A small child and three security personnel were wounded.
3	Shinwar District, Nangarhar Province	15	30	A car bombing (motor explosion) in Shinwar District killed at least 15 people and injured another 30.
5	Laghman Province	8 (+1)	38	A suicide bombing killed at least 8 people and injured 38 in Laghman Province.
7	Tagab District, Kapisa Province	3	0	A bomb killed at least 3 people in Tagab District, Kapisa Province.
8	Imam Sahib District, Kunduz Province	6	6	Taliban killed 6 security forces and another 6 were injured in Imam Sahib District, Kunduz Province.
9	Aliabad District, Kunduz Province	8	7	Taliban killed 4 Afghan soldiers and 4 police in Aliabad District, Kunduz Province. 5 soldiers and two police were also injured in the attack.
9	Helmand Province	3	3	In Helmand Province Taliban killed at least 3 security forces and another 3 were injured.
10	Grishk District, Helmand Province	5	9	A bomb killed at least 5 people and another 9 were injured in Grishk District, Helmand Province.
10	Shindand District, Herat Province	2	10	A bus hit a bomb. The attack left 2 people dead and 10 others were injured in Shindand District, Herat Province.
11	Sar-e Pol Province	13	3	At least 13 people including 10 Afghan soldiers were killed and another 3 people injured in a roadside bombing in Sar-e Pol Province.
14	Kushki Kuhna District, Herat Province	5	13	A roadside bomb killed at least 5 people and injured another 13 in Kesh-e-Kohna district.
14	Asmar, Kunar Province	5	0	At least 5 people were killed by a bomb in Asmar district.
14	Mihtarlam, Laghman Province	3	7	A bomb killed at least 3 people and injured 7 others in Mehtarlam, Laghman Province.
18	Sahib District, Kunduz Province	8	0	Taliban kills at least 8 security forces in Sahib District, Kunduz Province.
18	Chaghcharan, Ghor Province	12	100	A car bombing attack killed 12 people and injured another 100 in Chaghcharan, Ghor Province.
20	Zazi Maidan District, Khost Province	2	2	The governor of Zazi Maidan District and a bodyguard was shot dead and another 2 were injured in eastern Khost Province.
20	Jalrez District, Maidan Wardak Province	5	9	At least 5 people were killed and 9 were injured after two bombing attacks. The attacks occurred in Jalrez District, Maidan Wardak Province.
20	Kang District, Nimruz Province	12	0	At least 12 police were killed after two bombs exploded in Kang District, Nimruz Province.
21	Baharak District, Takhar Province	47	3	Taliban kills at least 47 police and injured 3 others in Baharak District, Takhar Province.
22	Shareen Tagab District, Faryab Province	4	10	Taliban attack Shareen Tagab District, Faryab Province with mortar. The attack left at leas 4 people dead and another 10 were injured.
23	Khash Rod District, Nimroz Province	20	0	Taliban kills at least 20 Afghan soldiers. The attack occurred in Khash Rod District, Nimroz Province.
24	Nimruz Province	6	2	Taliban kills at least 6 security forces and injured 2 others in Nimruz Province.
24	Ghazni, Ghazni District, Ghazni Province	9	1	At least 9 people were killed and another were injured after two bomb exploded in Ghazni, Ghazni District, Ghazni Province.
24	Kabul, Kabul Province	30 (+1)	70	A suicide bombing kills at least 30 people and another 70 were injured outside an educational center in Kabul, Kabul Province. The Islamic State of Iraq and the Levant – Khorasan Province claimed responsibility for the attack.
26	Kabul, Kabul Province	0	3	At least 3 people were injured in a magnetic mine explosion in Kabul.
27	Kabul, Kabul Province	3	10	A blast by a magnetic mine left at least 3 people dead in Kabul.
27	Khost, Khost Province	0 (+7)	0	Shooting and car bombings attacks occurred in Khost city. At least 7 perpetrators were killed by the security forces.

== See also ==
- 2020 in Afghanistan
- List of Islamist terrorist attacks
- List of mass car bombings
- List of terrorist attacks in Kabul
- List of terrorist incidents in 2020
- List of terrorist incidents linked to ISIL
- May 2020 Afghanistan attacks
- June 2020 Afghanistan attacks
- July 2020 Afghanistan attacks
- August 2020 Afghanistan attacks
- September 2020 Afghanistan attacks
- November 2020 Afghanistan attacks
