= Battle of Kunduz (2015) =

Battle during the War in Afghanistan

- Part of the War in Afghanistan (2001–2021)
- Situation on 27 September, after the Taliban had pushed ANA forces back to the airport. Controlled by the Afghan National Security Forces Controlled by Taliban forces and allies
Date	24 April – 13 October 2015 (5 months, 2 weeks and 5 days)
Location	Kunduz, Kunduz Province, Afghanistan 36.728611°N 68.868056°E
Result	Afghan victory: Taliban captures Kunduz on 27 September; Government forces regain control of Kunduz following counter-offensive amid Taliban withdrawal

Belligerents
Islamic Republic of Afghanistan Supported by: United States	(Afghanistan) Taliban

Commanders and leaders
(Afghanistan) Ashraf Ghani (Afghanistan) Mohammed Masoom Stanekzai (Afghanistan) Sher Mohammad Karimi (United States) John F. Campbell	Akhtar Mansoor; Sirajuddin Haqqani Mawlawi Salaam

Units involved
Afghan National Army; Commandos; Afghan National Police; Afghan Local Police; United States Army; Special Forces	Unknown

Strength
Initial: 3,000; Counter-offensive: 5,000–7,000+	Initial: 500; Counter-offensive: 1,500

Casualties and losses
(Islamic Republic of Afghanistan) 38 soldiers and police killed (United States) None	80–200 killed (Afghan government claim; denied by Taliban)
- Killed or Wounded: 848+ civilians (U.N. report); 100,000 displaced (over entire offensive)
- Kunduz within Afghanistan

The Battle of Kunduz took place from April to October 2015 for control of the city of Kunduz, located in northern Afghanistan, with Taliban fighters attempting to seize the city and displace Afghan security forces. On 28 September 2015, the Taliban forces suddenly overran the city, with government forces retreating outside the city. The capture marked the first time since 2001 that the Taliban had taken control of a major city in Afghanistan. The Afghan government claimed to have largely recaptured Kunduz by 1 October 2015 in a counterattack, although local sources in the city disputed the claim made by government officials.

Twelve hospital staff of Médecins Sans Frontières (Doctors Without Borders) and ten patients, including three children, were killed on October 3 by a prolonged series of US airstrikes on Kunduz Trauma Centre, an emergency trauma hospital run by the agency. Thirty-seven people were injured including nineteen staff members.

== Timeline ==
Map showing the Taliban advance on Kunduz.

=== Initial attack ===
The Taliban launched its attacks on Kunduz on 24 April, targeting four outlying districts around the city. By the 28th, they largely controlled the suburb of Gortepa, while in the Imam Sahib District Taliban fighters surrounded an Afghan National Army base and Afghan Local Police forces in the area were forced to retreat on several fronts. In response to the attacks, the Afghan government dispatched several thousand army troops to the region, and President Mohammad Ashraf Ghani convened an emergency meeting with military officials. United States fighter jets were deployed under the authority of the Resolute Support Mission, although they did not fire on the Taliban.

=== Sustained fighting ===
After a week-long standoff following the initial assault, government troops began an offensive on 7 May against Taliban fighters, which had largely grouped to the south of Kunduz in the Gul Tepa district. By late May, about 3,000 Afghan troops had arrived in the area, with Taliban strength estimated at 2,000 fighters, including militants from the Islamic State of Iraq and the Levant (ISIS) and the Islamic Movement of Uzbekistan. The surge of government troops forced the Taliban fighters to about 15 kilometres (9.3 mi) from Kunduz, back from their closest approach about 2 kilometres (1.2 mi) from the city earlier in the offensive.

A Taliban counteroffensive in June brought insurgent fighters into the Char Dara District, several miles from Kunduz. On 21 June, a Taliban spokesman said that it had taken complete control of the district, and had captured local police officers. A spokesman for the Kunduz District police force disputed the claim, saying that while there had indeed been fighting in the district, the Taliban only controlled about half of it and had not captured any police. Throughout July, the Taliban continued to make gains, capturing towns outside Kunduz and in the Khan Abad District to the southeast. According to the commander of a local militia allied with the government, about 2,000 local militia members and government troops had been forced to retreat, as the Afghan government had failed to dispatch reinforcements and supplies. The lack of assistance from ISAF air power made the battle even tougher for pro-government forces.

=== Capture ===
On the morning of 28 September, a rapid advance by the Taliban forces from three directions displaced the government troops in Kunduz city, who after several hours retreated to the outlying airport, leaving the Taliban in complete control of the city. According to a government security official, the Taliban had been vastly outnumbered, with only an estimated 500 fighters remaining against about 7,000 government troops and allied militia members. However, local politicians from Kunduz said that the government had failed to provide leadership and support to its fighters in the area.

On 29 September, Afghan forces began a counterattack from the airport towards the city, supported by American airstrikes throughout the day in the area and US Army Special Forces personnel, many of whom had been deployed that morning. However, by the end of the day government forces had failed to make headway, as the Taliban forced them back to and surrounded the airport. The government also dispatched additional troops by both air and land, though reinforcements traveling via road were delayed by Taliban ambushes.

By 30 September it was being claimed that anti-Taliban militias led by warlords were also joining the battle.

==== Government counter-offensive ====
Afghan and American ground forces began a ground offensive from the airport to Kunduz late on 30 September, and by daybreak on 1 October had captured several police facilities and the city prison from the Taliban. Late in the day, Afghan reinforcements arrived in the city, but American troops remained, as the Afghan forces planned to abandon their positions if the US soldiers retreated as they had intended. Afghan forces also claimed to have taken back Imam Sahib, although the wider Imam Sahib District remained under Taliban control. According to the Afghan defense ministry, about 150 Taliban fighters were killed in the day's offensive.

On 4 October, Taliban fighters claimed to have recaptured the majority of Kunduz. The following day, Afghan troops mounted a counter-offensive that pushed the Taliban back out of much of the city, with the national flag raised over the governor's residence for the first time since the beginning of the battle. According to a police spokesperson, while the Taliban still threatened, their primary battle line had been broken.

On 6 October, the Taliban renewed their attacks, apparently recapturing substantial portions of Kunduz, including the central Chowk Square and the northern part of the city.

On 13 October, Taliban fighters withdrew from Kunduz after several days of heavy fighting with Afghan troops, who were supported by United States special forces and airstrikes. According to a statement published on a Taliban-associated website, the retreat was due to the prospect of additional casualties and ammunition expenditure in continued fighting.

==== MSF hospital airstrike ====
A US AC-130 airstrike hit a hospital run by Médecins Sans Frontières (MSF [Doctors Without Borders]), killing 42 people, in a series of bombing raids that lasted from 2:08 am local time until 3:15 am on 3 October. The trauma center was destroyed during the attack while there were 105 patients and 80 medical staff inside. MSF had warned US and Afghan authorities of the hospital's location ahead of time, but bombing continued for more than 30 minutes after it notified military officials it was under attack.

On 7 October 2015 Barack Obama apologized for the air strike. MSF and the United Nations called for an independent investigation into the attack.

== Impact ==
Within the first weeks of fighting, an estimated tens of thousands of people had been displaced. In response, the World Food Programme sent aid packages for about 500 families in early May. By late May, some 100,000 people had been displaced, though some began returning as the Taliban were pushed back from the city proper.

By 30 September, a number of Afghan parliamentarians began calling for the resignation of President Ashraf Ghani and CEO Abdullah Abdullah. In response Ghani's office replied that he had ordered an investigation into how Kunduz City fell so quickly.

=== Casualties ===
At least 30 people, mostly civilians, had been killed in the fighting as of Wednesday, September 30, 2015, according to a health ministry spokesman. He also said hospitals in Kunduz had treated about 340 wounded. By 5 October, the government's casualty estimates were of 55 dead and 600 injured. According to a U.N. report, at least 848 civilians were killed or wounded following the Taliban attack.

=== Internal affairs ===
The fall of Kunduz came in the first year after the end of the ISAF mission and it raised questions on the ability of Afghan forces to resist the Taliban insurgents without international support. In November, President Ghani sacked several security officials citing they neglected their duties in defending the city. He also promised financial aid to the victims in Kunduz.

== See also ==
- Battle of Kunduz (2016)
