= Aqtash District =

- District
- Location of the district in Afghanistan
- Coordinates: 36.79°N 69.1°E
- Country: Afghanistan
- Province: Kunduz
- Established: Late 2015
- District Center: Aqtash

Government
  - Governor: Zabihullah Aimaq

Population (2019)
  - Total: 27,097
- Time zone: UTC+4:30 (Afghanistan Standard Time)

Aqtash District is a district in Kunduz Province, Afghanistan. It was not part of the 399 or 407 district sets, but is recognized in the 422 district set as a temporary district. It was split from Khanabad District in late 2015 after a visit from Ashraf Ghani, the president of Afghanistan. In 2019, only two polling centers were open in the district, with 277 votes cast.

== Geography ==
Aqtash is bordered by Dasht-e-Archi District to the north, Baharak District and Bangi District to the east, Khanabad District to the south, and Kunduz District to the west. Kunduz District holds the provincial capital of Kunduz, and Baharak and Bangi are located in Takhar Province. The Khanabad River forms Aqtash's southern border.

== History ==
Aqtash District was established in 2015 by Ashraf Ghani after he visited Kunduz Province. Gurtipa District and Calbad District were also created. A large operation was conducted to clear the district of militants in 2016, with dozens of villages cleared.

In the 2018 election, only two polling centers were open in Aqtash, and the district governor declined to provide further details other than "turnout was good". Earlier that year, an operation was taken to clear the district and succeeded. However, as soon as security forces left, the Taliban returned to the district. An operation was launched in 2017, causing 50 militant casualties. Later, in June 2019, a bastion was stormed in the district and 19 detainees were set free.

A large operation was taken by the government in early 2020, killing many insurgents and their commanders across Kunduz Province, including Aqtash. Over 10,000 people were displaced as a result of the fighting in Aqtash, or about 1472 families.
