= 'Aliabad =

'Aliabad علی‌آباد
- Village
- Location in Afghanistan
- Coordinates: 36°31′20″N 68°53′57″E
- Country: Afghanistan
- Province: Kunduz Province
- District: Ali abad District
- Elevation: 1,394 ft (425 m)
- Time zone: + 4:30

The town of 'Aliabad (علی‌آباد) is the center of Ali abad District in Kunduz Province, Northern Afghanistan. It is situated in the central part of the district at 425 m altitude on the main road between Kunduz and Baghlan. Aliabad has one hospital and is located in an area of rainfed cropland. The town is located on the Kunduz River.

On 12 June 2021, Taliban forces captured the village as part of their nationwide military offensive.

== See also ==
- Kunduz Province
