= August 2020 Afghanistan attacks =

Series of terrorist attacks

- Part of the War in Afghanistan
- Location: Jalalabad; Khwaja Ghar District; Baghlan Province; Ghazni; Nangarhar Province; Qadis District; Farah; Panjwayi District; Balkh Province; Jaghatū District
- Date: August 2020
- Target: Prison (Jalalabad); Police station (Ghazni)
- Deaths: 165
- Injuries: 177
- Perpetrators: Islamic State of Iraq and the Levant – Khorasan Province; Taliban

The August 2020 Afghanistan attacks were multiple attacks that occurred in August 2020. The attacks left at least 165 people dead, and injured another 177.

== Timeline of attacks ==
Date	Location	Dead	Injured	Details
2–3 August	Jalalabad, Nangarhar Province	29	50	Jalalabad prison attack - The Islamic State of Iraq and the Levant – Khorasan Province launched an attack on the prison in the Jalalabad city in Nangarhar Province. At least 29 people were killed in the attack and at least 50 others were injured.
5 August	Baghlan Province	12	Unknown	At least 12 people were killed after a mine planted by an unknown group exploded in Baghlan Province.
9 August	Ghazni	7	15	At least seven policemen were killed and 15 others injured after a car bomb exploded outside a police station in Ghazni. Nobody claimed responsibility for the attack.
12 August	Nangarhar Province	6	5	Insurgents kills at least 6 security forces and another 5 were injured in Nangarhar Province.
12 August	Qadis District	7	4	Taliban kills at least 4 security forces in Qadis District. 3 Talibans were also killed in the attack and another 4 were injured.
12 August	Farah, Farah Province	4	2	A car bombing kills at least 4 people and 2 others were injured in Farah a city located in Farah Province.
13 August	Panjwayi District, Kandahar Province	4	6	At least 4 people were killed and another 6 were injured after a bomb exploded in Panjwayi District, Kandahar Province.
13 August	Timor-Sarai, Balkh Province	12	2	Armed conflicts between Taliban terror group and security forces left at least 4 security forces dead and another 2 were injured and 8 insurgents dead in Timor-Sarai village in Balkh Province.
15 August	Baghlan Province; Uruzgan Province	9	9	Insurgents killed at least 4 police and injured 4 others in Baghlan Province. In another attack insurgents killed at least 5 security forces and injured 5 others in Uruzgan Province.
19 August	Kabul	1	1	A magnetic mine killed one and injured another in Kabul city.
19 August	Puli Khumri, Baghlan Province	2	11	A road side bombing kills at least 2 security forces and other 11 people were injured in Puli Khumri, Baghlan Province.
19 August	Kabul	3	16	A rocket attack left at least 3 people dead and another 16 were injured in Kabul.
20 August	Khwaja Bahauddin District, Takhar Province	14	6	Taliban kills at least 14 Afghan security forces and injured 6 others in Khwaja Bahauddin District, Takhar Province.
20 August	Khogyani District, Nangarhar Province	14	2	10 militants from the Taliban terrorist group were killed after attacking security forces, killing 4 of them in Khogyani district, Nangarhar Province.
23 August	Jaghatū District, Ghazni Province	7	0	At least 7 people have died after a bomb exploded in Jaghatū District, Ghazni Province.
24 August	Dih Yak District, Ghazni Province	3	6	The insurgents from terror group Taliban killed 3 Afghan security forces and injured another 6 in Dih Yak District, Ghazni Province.
24 August	Imam Sahib District, Kunduz Province	1	0	An attack left one member of the Afghan security forces dead in Kunduz Province.
25 August	Balkh District, Balkh Province	4	30	At least 4 people were killed and another 30 were injured in a truck bombing attack in Balkh District, Balkh Province.
25 August	Shahrak District, Ghor Province	8	6	Insurgents killed at least 8 Afghan soldiers and another 6 were wounded in Shahrak District, Ghor province.
27 August	Bagram District, Parwan Province	5	4	An attack in Sayad village, Bagram district, Parwan province left 4 civilians and 1 Afghan soldier dead and another 3 civilians and 1 soldier were injured.
28 August	Spin Boldak District, Kandahar Province	13	2	Two bombs killed at least 13 people and another 2 were injured in Spin Boldak District, Kandahar Province.

== See also ==
- May 2020 Afghanistan attacks
- June 2020 Afghanistan attacks
- July 2020 Afghanistan attacks
- September 2020 Afghanistan attacks
- October 2020 Afghanistan attacks
