= Archi, Kunduz Province =

Archi
- Location in Afghanistan
- Coordinates: 37°4′14″N 69°17′54″E
- Country: Afghanistan
- Province: Kunduz Province
- Elevation: 1,540 ft (470 m)

Population
  - Total: 8,792
- Time zone: + 4.30

The town of Archi (also: Chichkeh) is the center of the Archi District in Kunduz Province, Afghanistan. It is situated in a river valley very close to the border with Tajikistan.

== See also ==
- Kunduz Province
