= Kunduz airstrike =

Kunduz airstrike can refer to:

- 2009 Kunduz airstrike
- Kunduz hospital airstrike, in 2015
- Kunduz madrassa attack, in 2018
