= Ajrim =

Ajrim Ajrim
- Location in Afghanistan
- Coordinates: 36°35′N 68°12′E
- Country: Afghanistan

Ajrim is a ravine in Afghanistan. It is said to be crossed by the road from Kholm (Tashkurghan) to Khanabad east of Khairabad. There is a small stream of water there which while brackish had been drinkable. A road runs through it from Khairabad over the Tash Bel where it joins another road. There are no permanent inhabitants of the ravine. It was thought to be the base of a group of Arab nomads of the Haibak district in the early 20th century. There is also currently a village of the same name, located about 12 miles from Saripul.

== See also ==
- Baghlan Province
