= 2018 Kunduz madrassa airstrike =

Afghan Air Force attack on civilians in Kunduz, Afghanistan, 2 April 2018

Kunduz madrassa airstrike
- Part of War in Afghanistan (2001–2021)
- Kunduz in Afghanistan
- Location: Kunduz
- Date: 2 April 2018
- Attack type: Airstrike
- Deaths: 36+ civilians killed (as per UN)
- Injuries: 71+ civilians injured (as per UN)
- Perpetrator: (Islamic Republic of Afghanistan) Afghan Air Force

The Kunduz madrassa airstrike was an Afghan Air Force (AAF) airstrike that killed and injured many civilians at the Akhundzada Gojor Madrassa in the Dasht-e-Archi region of Kunduz, Afghanistan on 2 April 2018. The target of airstrike was a religious gathering at a Madrassa (religious school). A graduation ceremony was taking place at the Madrassa and hundreds of people were attending the ceremony at the time of airstrike. Initially, Afghan Government claimed that airstrike had killed scores of Taliban and denied any civilian casualties took place. But later the Afghan Government admitted that civilians were killed in the airstrike. Local residents from Dasht-e-Archi deny that any Taliban were present at the Madrassa. They said that only children and civilians were targeted and there were no Taliban among the casualties.

United Nations Assistance Mission in Afghanistan (UNAMA) concluded that around 36 people (30 children and 6 adults) were killed and 71 (51 children and 20 adults) were injured in the attack. UNAMA said that the toll could be much higher as it counted only those casualties that could be confirmed by three independent sources. UNAMA also contradicted Afghan officials claim that the target of the airstrike was Taliban planning session.

Afghanistan's president, Ashraf Ghani, apologised to the victims of airstrike. However, none of the perpetrators of the airstrike were punished.

== Airstrike ==
United Nations Assistance Mission in Afghanistan (UNAMA) in their report stated that Afghan Air Force (AAF) used rockets and heavy machine-gun fire on a religious gathering which resulted in high numbers of children casualties. UNAMA confirmed that the ceremony was widely publicized and was known in the area of Laghmani village. Around 400 posters were used to advertise the ceremony and special guests from around the country were to visit the ceremony. The victims and witnesses interviewed by UNAMA consistently reported that the MD-530F helicopter approached and fired rockets into the crowd, striking children sitting at the rear of the ceremony first. After the first rocket struck the crowd and people ran towards the nearby road and houses, the helicopters continued to launch rockets in the village and fire machineguns, reportedly following the path of individuals fleeing the area.

Doctors, who treated the victims of the airstrike, reported that "the victims had been hit by pieces of bomb and shrapnel".

== Aftermath ==
On 4 April 2018, hundreds of residents from Dasht-e-Archi started moving to Kunduz city (capital of Kunduz province) to protest the Afghan Air Force (AAF) airstrike. The protesters threatened that if the government does not investigate the airstrike, all the residents of Dasht-e-Archi will join the Taliban and announce their support for Islamic Emirate of Taliban.

Prominent Afghans rationalized the killing of Afghan children by Afghan government in pursuit of Taliban. Social media accounts (belonging to Afghans) based in Afghanistan and other western countries lashed out at anyone who questioned the official narrative and pointed out that civilians were killed in the attack. Some of these accounts belonged to former Afghan government officials, others to Afghan journalists, while the rest belonged to anonymous users.

=== Reaction ===
Omar Zakhilwal, the then-Afghan Ambassador to Pakistan, condemned the airstrike. He said that airstrike had occurred on the Madrassa and had killed many civilians and children.

Hamid Karzai, former president of Afghanistan, also condemned the strikes. He said that "such raids, carried out in the name of fighting terrorism, on our homes, hospitals and religious facilities are against all principles."

Ashraf Ghani, president of Afghanistan, apologised to the victims of the airstrike. The Afghan government apology came after 44 days of airstrike on the religious school. He claimed that the "main difference between government and insurgent is that a legitimate government will always seek forgiveness for mistake". However, his apology was criticised by many.
