= Khan Abad =

Khan Abad خان آباد
- Location in Afghanistan
- Coordinates: 36°40′59″N 69°9′49″E
- Country: Afghanistan
- Province: Kunduz Province
- District: Khan Abad District
- Elevation: 1,713 ft (522 m)

Population (2002)
  - Total: 75,546
- Time zone: UTC+4:30

Khan Abad or Khanabad is a town and the district center of the Khan Abad District in Kunduz Province, Afghanistan.

== Geography ==
Khan Abad is situated in the valley of the Khanabad River east of Kunduz.

== History ==
In 1860, the town formed part of the route of the pundit Abdul Mejid from Peshawar in British India to Kokand, then an independent khanate. On 22 August 2016, Afghan security forces retook the town from the Taliban after having lost control of it for 2 days.
