= Ak Tapa =

- Location in Afghanistan
- Coordinates: 36°59′N 68°34′E
- Country: Afghanistan

Ak Tap is a village located on the road from Kunda Gazar to Hazrat Imam. It is about 10 miles from Hazrat Imam, and, as of the turn of the twentieth century, housed 25 Uzbek families.

== See also ==
- Kunduz Province
