= Baba Hatim Ziyarat =

Islamic mausoleum in Kundus, Afghanistan

- Location of the mausoleum in Afghanistan

Religion
- Affiliation: Islam
- Ecclesiastical or organizational status: Mausoleum

Location
- Location: Outside Imam Sahib, Kunduz Province
- Country: Afghanistan
- Interactive map of Baba Hatim Ziyarat
- Coordinates: 36°39′N 66°30′E

Architecture
- Completed: 12th century CE

Specifications
- Dome: One
- Materials: Bricks; mortar

The Baba Hatem Ziyarat, also known as the Mausoleum of Baba Hatim, the Baba Hatim Tomb, the Baba Hatom Ziarat, and the Tomb of Salar Khalil (Salar Kalil, Salar Chalil Sayyid), is an Islamic mausoleum or ziyarat, located outside Imam Sahib, in the Kunduz Province of Afghanistan, a town bordering Tajikistan. The mausoleum complex was completed during the 11th and 12th centuries.

== Restoration ==
The mausoleum was restored between 1978 and 1979 by the Délégation Archéologique Française en Afghanistan and l'Institut Afghan d'Archéologie. Prior to the restorations, the tomb was structurally unstable, with layers of bricks missing from the exterior's upper walls. Excavating the walls to reveal their original height, the restoration team replaced the missing bricks, restoring the exterior's original cubical shape and the four octagonal colonettes embedded at its corners. The dome was reassembled with new mortar, and refinished on the exterior with plaster and pairs of bricks protruding in four concentric rings. The dome's circular and octagonal drums were also reconstructed, and a metal finial placed atop it.

== Architecture ==
The Ziyārat of Bābā Ḥātem is a square-shaped mausoleum topped with a dome, constructed from baked brick and dating back to the late 11th or early 12th century CE. Its architectural layout features a central domed chamber flanked by four projecting niches, forming a symmetrical, cubic structure that reflects the stylistic norms of early Islamic funerary architecture in Central Asia.

The structure’s walls are composed of meticulously arranged fired bricks, serving both as the building’s framework and its decorative surface. According to Archnet, the exterior showcases patterned brickwork that creates geometric designs and subtle reliefs—hallmarks of Seljuk-era aesthetics in the region. This understated ornamentation, combined with the building’s compact proportions, exemplifies the clarity and simplicity typical of early Seljuk funerary architecture.

The mausoleum's interior features a central tomb chamber with a small, unmarked cenotaph with its head facing the entrance. The trilobed squinches at the corners of the dome serve as the transition from the square base to the dome. Stucco was used to decorate the interior walls and squinches. The niches, squinches, and dome drum are decorated with geometric patterns, carved floral motifs (some stylized to resemble ibex heads when viewed in profile), and bands with Kufic inscriptions. Parts of the decoration have been preserved and restored during renovations, despite the fact that most of it was damaged over time.

The Institut Afghan d'Arréologie and the Délégation Archéologique Française en Afghanistan meticulously restored the monument in 1978 and 1979. The dome drum and finial were rebuilt, and missing brick layers on the exterior were replaced to return the tomb to its original cubic shape. The original footprint and architectural features, such as the octagonal colonettes and distinctive brick and stucco ornamentation, were intended to be preserved.

== See also ==
- Islam in Afghanistan
