= Baharak Ambush =

2020 attack in Takhar, Afghanistan

Baharak ambush
- Part of the War in Afghanistan (2001–2021)
- Province where the ambush occurred.
Date	21 October 2020
Location	Baharak District, Takhar, Afghanistan
Result	Taliban victory

Belligerents
Islamic Republic of Afghanistan	(Afghanistan) Taliban

Commanders and leaders
Raz Mohammad Doorandish †	(Afghanistan) Unknown

Units involved
Afghan Army; Afghan Police: Special Police	(Afghanistan) Unknown

Strength
(Islamic Republic of Afghanistan) 60–100 Afghan forces	(Afghanistan) Unknown

Casualties and losses
(Islamic Republic of Afghanistan) 34–55 killed (Islamic Republic of Afghanistan) 8 wounded Several Humvees destroyed	(Afghanistan) 22 killed

The Baharak ambush was an incident that occurred on October 21, 2020, when members of the Taliban ambushed an Afghan security forces unit in the small village of Baharak in Takhar province. It was the deadliest attack by the Taliban in 2020.

== Background ==
On April 6, 2020, Taliban fighters mounted an attack on a security post in Baharak District Center but were repelled by Afghan security forces. Two Taliban fighters were killed, one of whom was reported to be a commander. An unspecified number of civilians were also wounded.

== Ambush ==
At 03:00 AM, an elite Taliban unit armed with night-vision goggles and assault rifles attacked an Afghan security forces unit conducting an operation to clear Taliban fighters from the area. The Taliban fighters took up positions in houses, leading to several hours of intense fighting. During the fighting, security forces repeatedly called for support but did not receive any. Deputy Police Chief of Takhar, Raz Mohammad Doorandish, was killed. Several Humvees were also set ablaze.

== Aftermath ==
The day after the ambush, an airstrike by the Afghan Air Force targeted a madrasa in the village of Hazara Qurluq, believing Taliban fighters involved in the previous day's attack were hiding there. The strike killed 11 children and their imam, and wounded 18 others. Afghan government officials denied that children were killed, claiming only Taliban fighters died. The Minister of Defence did not deny that the strike hit a school.
