= The Voice of Kazakhstan Kids season 2 =

The Voice of Kazakhstan Kids
- Season 2
- Hosted by: Galym Kenshilik; Gulnur Orazymbetova (backstage)
- Coaches: Jubanish Jeksen; Arapbaeva Marzhan; Dastan Orazbekov; Zhanar Dugalova

Release
- Original network: Qazaqstan TV
- Original release: March 26, 2022 – 2022

The second season of Kazakh reality singing competition The Voice of Kazakhstan Kids premiered on March 26, 2022. This is the revival of the series after the airing of first season on 2017 in Perviy Kanal Evraziya. After the Qazaqstan TV re-acquired the airing rights, a month after the airing of the regular version, it announced the second season of kid's version.

This season, coaching panel consist of four artist, named Jubanish Jeksen, Dastan Orazbekov, Zhanar Dugalova and the regular version's fifth season coach Arapbayeva Marzhan. Hosted by Galym Kenshilik and Gulnur Orazymbetova.

== Teams ==
- Winner
- Runner-up
- Third place
- Fourth place
- Eliminated in the Finale

- Eliminated in the Semifinals
- Eliminated in the Live Shows
- Eliminated in the Battles

Coaches	Top 60 Artists				
Zhanar Dugalova					
Zhanar Dugalova	Farïza Beymaxambet	Eva Shirko	Nurşwaq Bolat	Jasmïna Tüzelova	Victor Emelyanov
Zhanar Dugalova	Sırım Sağat	Adïna Ötepova	Aynel Asqarova	Eñlik Bayzaq	Dalia Smagulova
Dastan Orazbekov					
Dastan Orazbekov	Xabïbulla Qıdıralïev	Baqdawlet Almat	Darxan Toqbergen	Nurbol Suleiman	Äbilqayır Jumabay
Dastan Orazbekov	Ramïna Satıbaldı	Nurlıbek Saparbay	Maya Bolat	Abay Äskerov	Balım Nısanalı
Arapbayeva Marzhan					
Arapbayeva Marzhan	Sofïya Balğazïna	Nurlı Mustafa	Aqnur Nurjanova	Yasmin Ayupova	
Arapbayeva Marzhan	Käwsar Mederqul	Aqnur Aqmolda	Dastan Turdalı	Liya Ruslan	Ämïna Kelis
Jubanish Jeksen					
Jubanish Jeksen	Älibï Seyitqoja	Gawhar Xalıq	Miras Maksimov	Nürali Karmys	Baljamal Nurlıbekqızı
Jubanish Jeksen	Adelïna Muxamedjanova	Ekaterina Tabarina	Äygerim Esmurzaeva	Adïlya Xalel	Asqar Altayulı

== Blind Auditions ==
Blind Auditions started on March 26. Each coach has to complete its team with 15 young artist. At the end of the blind auditions, 60 young artist would go forward to the next round.

✔	Coach pressed his/her "I WANT YOU" button
	Artist defaulted to this coach's team
	Artist elected to join this coach's team
	Artist eliminated as no coach pressing his or her "I WANT YOU" button

Episode	Order	Artist	Age	Hometown	Song	Coach's and artist's choices			
Episode	Order	Artist	Age	Hometown	Song	Zhanar	Dastan	Marzhan	Jubanish
Episode 1 (26 March)	1	Älïnur Xamzïn	11	Oral	"Who's Lovin' You"	✔	✔	✔	✔
Episode 1 (26 March)	2	Armen Saakyan	13	Aqtaw	"Añız arw"	✔	—	✔	✔
Episode 1 (26 March)	3	Ayzat Aydosulı	11	Qaratöba, Azerbaijan	"Bizdiñ nostalgïya"	—	—	✔	—
Episode 1 (26 March)	4	Amira Pulatova	13	Nur-Sultan	"Ömir"	—	—	—	✔
Episode 1 (26 March)	5	Azat Sündetbek	11	Almaty	"Qorqıt-qobız"	—	✔	—	—
Episode 1 (26 March)	6	Beybarıs & Sultan Ğarïfullïevtar	10	Fedorovka	"Erkekpin men"	—	—	—	—
Episode 1 (26 March)	7	Aygerim Tilewbek	13	Nur-Sultan	"Winner"	✔	✔	✔	✔
Episode 2 (2 April)	1	Şerxan Arıstan	11	Almaty	"Moldabaydıñ äni"	✔	✔	✔	✔
Episode 2 (2 April)	2	Inju Esimjan	10	Almaty	"Köktem valsi"	—	—	—	—
Episode 2 (2 April)	3	Tamari Kavtaradze	13	Georgia	"And I am Telling You I'm not Going"	✔	✔	✔	✔
Episode 2 (2 April)	4	Estel Nosinova	14	Nur-Sultan	"Kim bilet"	—	—	—	—
Episode 2 (2 April)	5	Darxan Toqbergen	9	Mangystau	"16 qız"	—	✔	—	—
Episode 2 (2 April)	6	Baqdawlet Almat	13	Qyzylorda	"Telefon"	—	✔	—	—
Episode 2 (2 April)	7	Dalia Smagulova	12	Pavlodar	"Qayran köñil-ay"	✔	✔	✔	—
Episode 2 (2 April)	8	Äbilqayır Jumabay	11	Almaty	"Djaz älemi"	✔	✔	✔	✔
Episode 3 (9 April)	1	Kamïla Sağımbay	14	Almaty	"Sälem sağan, tuğan el"	—	✔	—	✔
Episode 3 (9 April)	2	Jarqınay Sağımbay	14	Atyrau	"Jaydarman"	—	—	—	—
Episode 3 (9 April)	3	Nuraylım Aybekova	13	Qaragandi	"Samaltaw"	—	—	—	—
Episode 3 (9 April)	4	Adina Sulenova	10	Nur-Sultan	"Anajan"	✔	—	—	✔
Episode 3 (9 April)	5	Elnur Tursin	12	Almaty	"Jaqsı adamdarım"	—	—	—	—
Episode 3 (9 April)	6	Nurbol Suleiman	9	Urzhar	"Atameken"	—	✔	—	—
Episode 3 (9 April)	7	Liya Ruslan	9	Nur-Sultan	"Beat It"	—	—	✔	—
Episode 3 (9 April)	8	Ersultan Omar	13	Nur-Sultan	"Qustar äni"	✔	✔	✔	✔
Episode 4 (16 April)	1	Medina Kuzembaeva	9	Aqtobe	"Think"	—	✔	✔	✔
Episode 4 (16 April)	2	Baljamal Nurlıbekqızı	13	Aqtobe	"Erteñime senemin"	✔	—	—	✔
Episode 4 (16 April)	3	Eljan Dosbolatov	13	Shymkent	"Beggin"	—	—	—	—
Episode 4 (16 April)	4	Nurşwaq Bolat	9	Nur-Sultan	"Künge tabınw"	✔	—	—	—
Episode 4 (16 April)	5	Ämïna Kelis	8	Almaty	"Part of Your World"	—	—	✔	✔
Episode 4 (16 April)	6	Ïlïyas Qorğanbay	13	Taraz	"Baqıt quşağında"	—	—	—	—
Episode 4 (16 April)	7	Aylun Zawşeva	14	Taraz	"Qay zaman"	✔	✔	✔	—
Episode 4 (16 April)	8	Ayğanım Amantay	12	Nur-Sultan	"Kökke örle"	—	—	—	—
Episode 4 (16 April)	9	Milana Ponomorenko	13	Moscow, Russia	"Killing Me Softly with His Song"	✔	✔	✔	✔
Episode 5 (23 April)	1	Aqjarqın Aydosova	11	Nur-Sultan	"Ata-dästür"	—	✔	—	✔
Episode 5 (23 April)	2	Käwsar Mederqul	12	Taraz, Jambyl	"Derniere dance"	✔	✔	✔	✔
Episode 5 (23 April)	3	Aldïyar Qasanğalïev	13	Atyrau	"Caruso"	—	—	—	—
Episode 5 (23 April)	4	Elayna Xalıqbek	12	Altay	"Qara-ay közim"	—	—	—	—
Episode 5 (23 April)	5	Yasmin Ayupova	13	Zhitiqara, Kostanay	"Izin körem"	—	✔	✔	✔
Episode 5 (23 April)	6	Nurlı Mustafa	12	Atyrau	"Asıl äjem"	—	—	✔	✔
Episode 5 (23 April)	7	Ekaterina Tabarina	13	Nur-Sultan	"Namalyuyu tobi zori"	—	—	—	✔
Episode 5 (23 April)	8	Asqar Altayulı	11	Mangystau	"Qızdar-ay"	✔	✔	✔	✔
Episode 6 (30 April)	1	Miras Maksimov	13	Almaty	"Daydïdaw"	✔	—	—	✔
Episode 6 (30 April)	2	Adelina Müsina	11	Nur-Sultan	"Aygölek"	—	—	—	—
Episode 6 (30 April)	3	Sofïya Balğazïna	11	Almaty	"Sügirdiñ termesi"	—	—	✔	—
Episode 6 (30 April)	4	Eva Şïrko	13	Nur-Sultan	"Gülstan-Qazaqstanım"	✔	—	—	—
Episode 6 (30 April)	5	Jansaya Sarina	10	Qostanay	"Baldäwren"	—	—	—	—
Episode 6 (30 April)	6	Rawf-Mağjan Ötelgen	11	Aqtaw	"Nurımnıñ termesi"	—	—	—	—
Episode 6 (30 April)	7	Gawhar Xalıq	12	Nur-Sultan	"Sarıarqa"	—	—	—	✔
Episode 6 (30 April)	8	Nurlıbek Saparbay	14	Almaty	"Sarı ala qaz"	—	✔	—	—
Episode 6 (30 April)	9	Balım Nısanalı	9	Aqtobe	"Tuğan e"	—	✔	—	—
Episode 7 (7 May)	1	Sırım Sağat	12	Nur-Sultan	"Öz elim"	✔	—	—	—
Episode 7 (7 May)	2	Adïna Ötepova	13	Nur-Sultan	"Qoy, kürsinbe"	✔	—	—	—
Episode 7 (7 May)	3	Jankerim Abzalbek	8	Nur-Sultan	"Bïpıl"	—	—	—	—
Episode 7 (7 May)	4	Ayqaraköz Raşïd	10	Nur-Sultan	"Arman-ay"	—	—	—	—
Episode 7 (7 May)	5	Kamïla Küzdenbaeva	12	Nur-Sultan	"Asqaq armanım"	—	—	✔	—
Episode 7 (7 May)	6	Nürali Karmys	13	Oral	"Varto chi ni"	—	—	—	✔
Episode 7 (7 May)	7	Arujan Ermek	12	Almaty	"Qısmet"	—	—	—	—
Episode 7 (7 May)	8	Ramïna Satıbaldı	9	Nur-Sultan	"Men qazaqpın"	—	✔	—	—
Episode 7 (7 May)	9	Dastan Turdalı	10	Almaty	"Je t'aime"	✔	✔	✔	✔
Episode 8 (14 May)	1	Ädilbek Baqaşarulı	9	Almaty	"Qarağım-ay"	—	—	—	—
Episode 8 (14 May)	2	Xabïbulla Qıdıralïev	13	Qyzylorda	"Bulbul qus"	—	✔	—	—
Episode 8 (14 May)	3	Ayaru Jumadïlla	13	Turkistan	"Twğan jer"	—	—	—	—
Episode 8 (14 May)	4	Jasmïna Tüzelova	9	Nur-Sultan	" Ayta bersin"	✔	—	—	—
Episode 8 (14 May)	5	Nal Äbiken	12	Nur-Sultan	"Dop"	—	✔	—	—
Episode 8 (14 May)	6	Ayrïs Äbiken	14	Nur-Sultan	" Unaydı mağan"	—	—	—	—
Episode 8 (14 May)	7	Älibï Seyitqoja	13	Almaty	"Qalqataydıñ"	✔	✔	✔	✔
Episode 8 (14 May)	8	Aynel Asqarova	13	Atyrau	"I Found A Boy"	✔	✔	—	—
Episode 8 (14 May)	9	Aqnur Aqmolda	13	Almaty	"Aqqw-arman"	—	—	✔	—
Episode 9 (21 May)	1	Meyram Qalmırzaev			"Asıl arman"	—	—	—	—
Episode 9 (21 May)	2	Aqnur Nurjanova			"Aqqu senim"	—	—	✔	✔
Episode 9 (21 May)	3	Maya Bolat			"Kök aspan"	—	✔	—	—
Episode 9 (21 May)	4	Adïlya Xalel			"Ägugay, dombıra"	—	—	—	✔
Episode 9 (21 May)	5	Farïza Beymaxambet			"Ğasırlıq muñ"	✔	—	✔	✔
Episode 9 (21 May)	6	Baqıtbek Berikulı			"Kökşolaq"	—	—	—	—
Episode 9 (21 May)	7	Ersultan Narman			"Bir dosıñ kerek"	—	—	—	—
Episode 9 (21 May)	8	Äygerim Esmurzaeva			"Never gonna break my faith"	—	✔	—	✔
Episode 9 (21 May)	9	Victor Emelyanov			"Hallelujah"	✔	✔	✔	✔
Episode 10 (28 May)	1	Ämïna Asğatova			"Uqsamaymın basqağa"	—	✔	—	✔
Episode 10 (28 May)	2	Eñlik Bayzaq			"Jumaq meken"	✔	✔	✔	✔
Episode 10 (28 May)	3	Adelïna Muxamedjanova			"Qazaq valsi"	✔	—	—	✔
Episode 10 (28 May)	4	Arsen Şağadat			"Qïyalï qız"	—	—	—	Team Full
Episode 10 (28 May)	5	Elikay Samenbek			"Qismet"	—	✔	—	Team Full
Episode 10 (28 May)	6	Abay Äskerov			"Gülstan-Qazaqstanım"	Team Full	✔	—	Team Full
Episode 10 (28 May)	7	Inzhu Toğızbay			"Samğa"	Team Full	Team Full	—	Team Full
Episode 10 (28 May)	8	Jasmïn Tileumbetova			"Qazaq eli osınday"	Team Full	Team Full	✔	Team Full

== The Battle Rounds ==
Battle rounds started on June 11. Coaches narrowing down its team into group of three artists to sing a song together. Out of three, only one would move forward to the Live rounds while the other two would be eliminated.

Artist won the Battle and advanced to the Sing-offs
Artist lost the Battle and was eliminated

Episode	Coach	Order	Winner	Song	Losers	
Episode 11 (4 June)	Marzhan	1	Ayzat Aydosulı	"Allo"	Liya Ruslan	Ämïna Kelis
Episode 11 (4 June)	Zhanar	2	Aylun Zawşeva	"Raxmet sağan, twğan el"	Eñlik Bayzaq	Dalia Smagulova
Episode 11 (4 June)	Jubanish	3	Adina Sulenova	"Alataw"	Adïlya Xalel	Asqar Altayulı
Episode 11 (4 June)	Dastan	4	Azat Sündetbek	"Jelkildek"	Abay Äskerov	Balım Nısanalı
Episode 11 (4 June)	Jubanish	5	Ämïna Asğatova	"Wannabe"	Ekaterina Tabarina	Äygerim Esmurzaeva
Episode 11 (4 June)	Zhanar	6	Ersultan Omar	"Boyı bulğañ"	Adïna Ötepova	Aynel Asqarova
Episode 12 (11 June)	Jubanish	1	Kamïla Sağımbay	"Otan Ana"	Adelïna Muxamedjanova	Baljamal Nurlıbekqızı
Episode 12 (11 June)	Dastan	2	Milana Ponomorenko	"Une vie d`amour"	Nurlıbek Saparbay	Maya Bolat
Episode 12 (11 June)	Marzhan	3	Jasmïn Tileumbetova	"Ökinbe sen"	Aqnur Aqmolda	Dastan Turdalı
Episode 12 (11 June)	Zhanar	4	Älïnur Xamzïn	"Qızdar-ay"	Sırım Sağat	Victor Emelyanov
Episode 12 (11 June)	Jubanish	5	Amira Pulatova	"Asıl ana"	Miras Maksimov	Nürali Karmys
Episode 12 (11 June)	Dastan	6	Nal Äbiken	"Ah! Yah! Mah!"	Ramïna Satıbaldı	Äbilqayır Jumabay
Episode 12 (11 June)	Marzhan	7	Kamïla Küzdenbaeva	"Qazaq qızdarı"	Käwsar Mederqul	
Episode 13 (18 June)	Marzhan	1	Armen Saakyan	"Qızdar men jigitter"	Aqnur Nurjanova	Yasmin Ayupova
Episode 13 (18 June)	Zhanar	2	Elikay Samenbek	"You're my heart, you're my soul"	Nurşwaq Bolat	Jasmïna Tüzelova
Episode 13 (18 June)	Jubanish	3	Şerxan Arıstan	"Suliko"	Älibï Seyitqoja	Gawhar Xalıq
Episode 13 (18 June)	Dastan	4	Medina Kuzembaeva	"Samaya vyshka"	Darxan Toqbergen	Nurbol Suleiman
Episode 13 (18 June)	Zhanar	5	Aygerim Tilewbek	"Sïy"	Farïza Beymaxambet	Eva Shirko
Episode 13 (18 June)	Dastan	6	Aqjarqın Aydosova	"Şyda"	Xabïbulla Qıdıralïev	Baqdawlet Almat
Episode 13 (18 June)	Marzhan	7	Tamari Kavtaradze	"Bir bala"	Sofïya Balğazïna	Nurlı Mustafa
