= Qalay-I-Zal District =

Qalay-I-Zal District ولسوالی قلعه ذال
- District
- Location of Qala-i-Zal in Kunduz Province
- Coordinates: 37.0131°N 68.4603°E
- Country: Afghanistan
- Province: Kunduz Province
- Time zone: UTC+4:30 (Afghanistan Standard Time)

Qalay-I-Zal District (ولسوالی قلعه ذال), also spelled Qala-i-Zal, is situated in the western part of Kunduz Province, northern Afghanistan. It borders Balkh Province to the west and Tajikistan to the north along the Panj, Vakhsh and Amu Darya rivers. To the east it borders Imam Sahib District and to the south Kunduz and Chahar dara districts. Qalay-I-Zal River flows through the district and divides it in two parts. The population is 60,600 (2006) - 60% Turkmen and 40% Pashtun. The district is almost a desert and only the irrigated land is arable. The agriculture and carpet weaving are the most important sources of income.

The district was fought over with the Taliban in the War in Afghanistan.

The Taliban captured Qalay-I-Zal District on 6 May 2017 during their 2017 spring offensive; Operation Mansoori.
