= Char Dara District =

Chārdara District ولسوالی چاردره
- District
- Location in Afghanistan
- Coordinates: 36.6933°N 68.8014°E
- Country: Afghanistan
- Province: Kunduz Province
- Time zone: UTC+4:30 (Afghanistan Standard Time)

Chārdara District (ولسوالی چاردره; also known as Chahar Dara, Chahar Darreh or Char Darreh) is one of the seven districts in Kunduz Province in northern Afghanistan. It is situated in the south-west part of Kunduz Province and has borders with Qalay-I-Zal District to the north-west, Kunduz District to the north-east, Ali Abad District to the south-east, Baghlan Province to the south and Samangan Province to the south-west.

== Population ==
Most of this population lives in villages or farms in the north-west portion of the district along the south-west bank of the Kunduz River. This land is cultivated and accounts for approximately 15% of the area of the Chardara District. The remaining land in the district to the south-west comprises desert highlands that are mostly uninhabitable.

== Geography ==
The Kunduz River valley is the dominant terrain feature in Kunduz Province, and the river forms a natural north-eastern boundary between Chardara District and Kunduz District. The river, along with a major tributary and derivative canals provide irrigation to the single crop cultivation fields that dominate land usage in the north-eastern portion of Chardara District. The district also has some dual crop fields.

== War in Afghanistan (2001–present) ==
When the Taliban were ousted from the Kunduz Province in 2001, parts of the Chardara District were badly damaged. The district remained relatively peaceful until 2008, when Taliban and Al-Qaeda-linked insurgents, including Uzbeks and Chechens, began reappearing in the northern part of the country. In Kunduz Province, they established their main foothold in Chardara District and are able to operate openly for the most part.

Beginning in April 2009, German and Afghan troops based in Kunduz made several attempts to combat the rising presence of militants in the Chardara District. In July 2009, German soldiers launched their biggest military operation since World War II, to displace the militants from the district. Their operations were largely viewed as unsuccessful as the militants were not ousted from Chardara.

In September 2009, at least 70 people were killed near Haji Aman in Chardara District when NATO aircraft struck two oil-tankers hijacked by Taliban insurgents.

On 17 November 2009 it was reported that 4 security guards were killed in a battle with militants as they attacked Sediqi Construction Company. 1 Militant was also killed.

On 10 February 2011, a suicide bomber killed a district governor and six other people in the district of Chardara, where the insurgency is well entrenched.

In 2015, Chardara has been the site of heavy fighting.

On 31 May 2016, the 20 remaining hostages from the Kunduz-Takhar highway hostage crisis, where the Taliban held around 220 hostages (at least 23 had already been killed) were transported to the village of Omarkhel.

As of September 25 2016, the district is controlled by the Taliban.
