= Aziza Ahmadyar =

Afghan politician

Aziza Ahmadyar is an Afghan politician and women's rights activist. She also founded the Afghan Women's Resource Center. Currently, Ahmadyar is a Foreign Liaison Director for the Ministry of Information, Culture and Tourism in Afghanistan.

== Biography ==
Ahmadyar was raised in Kunduz and went to Kabul University to study literature. She came back to Kunduz to teach and coach girls' sports. Ahmadyar credits her father's progressive views, "supporting her education and professional development" as part of her success later in life.

In 1975, she was elected as a representative of Kunduz to help draw a new national constitution at the Constitutional Loya Jirga. She was one of six women representatives at the event.

In 1978, Ahmadyar's father was pressured to join the Communist Party and when he refused, he was assassinated in his home, causing Ahmadyar to become "skeptical of all party politics." During the time of Soviet occupation in Afghanistan, Ahmadyar taught for some time in Kabul, but in 1989, she fled and was a refugee in Peshawar, Pakistan.

In Peshawar, she became involved with the International Rescue Committee. In 1989, she founded the Afghan Women's Resource Center (AWRC), which worked to provide professional educational tools to teachers. When the Taliban withdrew in 2002, AWRC became the first Non-governmental organization (NGO) to establish a presence in Kabul.

In 2005, Ahmadyar was chosen for the new position of Foreign Liaison Officer in the Ministry of Information, Culture and Tourism. In this capacity, she also discusses how security is a problem for women in Afghanistan.
