= Weghnan Lake =

Lake in Takhar Province of Afghanistan

- Houz-e Weghnan
- حوض وغنان (Dari)
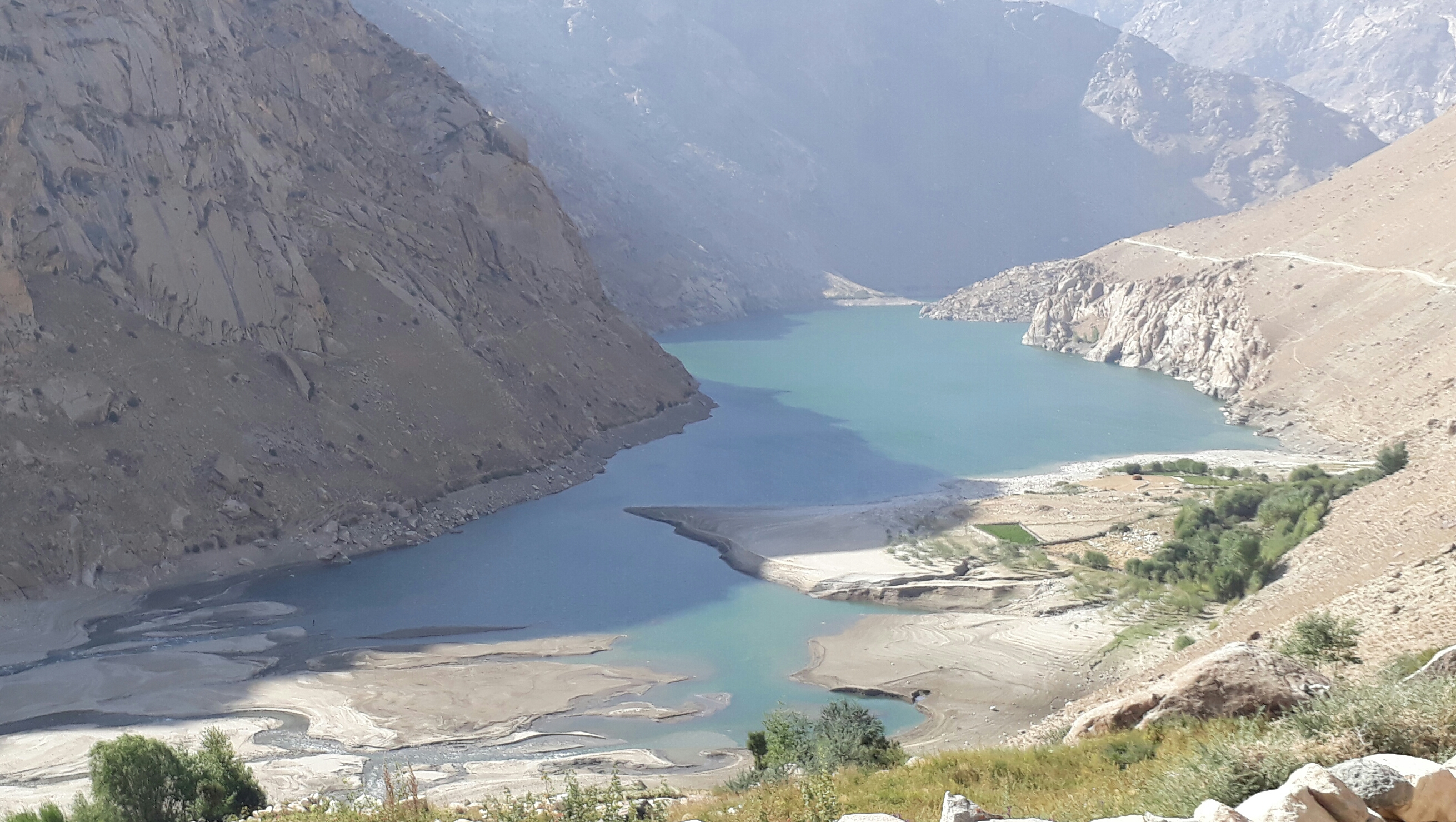
- Weghnan Lake

- Location within Afghanistan
- Interactive map of Weghnan Lake
- Location: Warsaj District, Afghanistan
- Coordinates: 36°01′56″N 70°00′36″E
- Max. length: 2.9 km (1.8 mi)
- Max. width: 0.4 km (0.25 mi)
- Surface elevation: 2,502 m (8,209 ft)

Weghnan Lake, also known as Weghnan Natural Pool (Dari: حوض وغنان), is located in the Warsaj District of Takhar Province in northeastern Afghanistan. The lake is about 2.9 km (1.8 mi) long and 0.4 km (0.25 mi) wide, and sits at approximately 2,502 m (8,209 ft) above sea level on the Weghnan River, which flows north to the village of Weghnan.

== See also ==
- Tourism in Afghanistan
- List of rivers in Afghanistan
- List of dams and reservoirs in Afghanistan
- List of protected areas of Afghanistan
