= Khanabad River =

River in Afghanistan

Coordinates: 36.8630°N 68.6137°E

The Khānabād River (Pashto: د خان اباد سیند; Persian: رود خان‌آباد) flows in the provinces of Takhar and Kunduz in northern Afghanistan. The Khanabad is a tributary of the Kunduz River, which is in turn a tributary of the Amu River.

== Course ==
The Khanabad rises in the southeast of Takhar Province, in Warsaj District in the Hindu Kush. It flows northwest, and receives a number of glacier-fed tributaries. As far as the small village of Shuri (a little north of Farkhar) the river flows in a narrow valley, then enters a broad plain. Its waters here are much used for irrigation. It then flows through Taloqan, the capital of Takhar Province, and a little distance downstream enters Kunduz Province. It then flows through Khanabad, turns west and flows to the north of Kunduz. It enters the Kunduz River 30 km past Kunduz.

The total length of the river is about 400 km.

== Tributaries ==
The Khanabad receives many tributaries, fed mainly by glaciers and snow melt in spring and summer. They include:

- Warsaj, flowing from the south of Takhar Province
- Khost, a glacier-fed strong-flowing tributary rising in Baghlan Province
- Shal
- Narik
