= Aliabad District =

Aliabad District د علي اباد ولسوالۍ
- District
- Location in Afghanistan
- Coordinates: 36.53°N 68.8778°E
- Country: Afghanistan
- Province: Kunduz Province
- Time zone: UTC+4:30 (Afghanistan Standard Time)

The Aliabad District (Pashto: د علي اباد ولسوالۍ) is situated in the southern part of Kunduz Province, Afghanistan. It borders the Baghlan Province to the south, Chahar dara District to the west, Kunduz and Khan Abad districts to the north and Takhar Province to the east.

The population was 41,700 in 2006, consisting of these ethnic groups:

- 30% Pashtuns
- 30% Uzbeks
- 20% Tajiks
- 20% Hazaras

54,207|| || 47% Pashtuns, 33% Tajik, 12% Hazara, 8% Uzbek

The district center is 'Aliabad, located in the central part of the district on the road between Kunduz and Baghlan. The district is generally poor and seriously affected by the drought. The German reconstruction team is working on a new dam.
