= Imam Sahib =

Imam Sahib امام صاحب
- Town
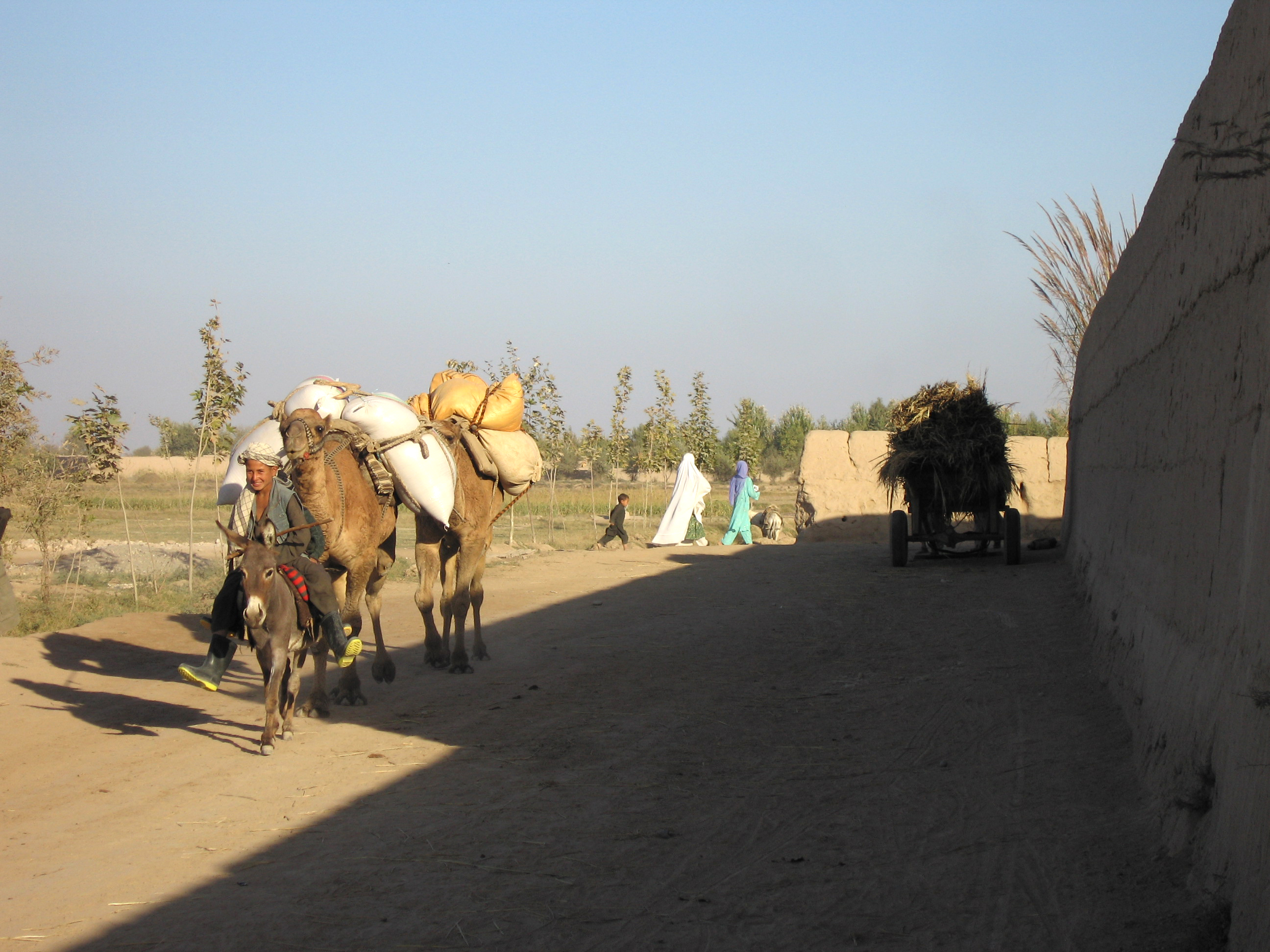

- Location in Afghanistan
- Coordinates: 37°11′4″N 68°54′52″E
- Country: Afghanistan
- Province: Kunduz
- District: Imam Sahib
- Elevation: 1,112 ft (339 m)

Population (2022)
  - Total: 41,669
- Time zone: UTC+4:30

Imām Ṣāhib (Pashto/Persian: امام صاحب) is a town in the Kunduz Province of Afghanistan, center of the Imam Sahib District. It is sometimes called Khwaja or Hazrat. Baba Hatim Ziyarat is located on the outside of Imam Sahib. The port of Shir Khan Bandar is located to the west of the town. In 2022, it had an estimated population of 41,669.

== Climate ==
With an influence from the local steppe climate, Imam Sahib features a cold semi-arid climate (BSk) under the Köppen climate classification. The average annual temperature in Imam Sahib is 17.1 °C, while the annual precipitation averages 307 mm.

July is the hottest month of the year with an average temperature of 30.2 °C. The coldest month January has an average temperature of 3.4 °C.

Climate data for Imam Sahib
Month	Jan	Feb	Mar	Apr	May	Jun	Jul	Aug	Sep	Oct	Nov	Dec	Year
Mean daily maximum °C (°F)	8.2 (46.8)	11.4 (52.5)	17.1 (62.8)	23.8 (74.8)	30.3 (86.5)	37.0 (98.6)	38.5 (101.3)	36.8 (98.2)	32.1 (89.8)	25.1 (77.2)	16.7 (62.1)	10.5 (50.9)	24.0 (75.1)
Daily mean °C (°F)	3.4 (38.1)	6.3 (43.3)	11.6 (52.9)	17.7 (63.9)	22.9 (73.2)	28.4 (83.1)	30.2 (86.4)	28.4 (83.1)	23.4 (74.1)	17.2 (63.0)	10.2 (50.4)	5.3 (41.5)	17.1 (62.8)
Mean daily minimum °C (°F)	−1.3 (29.7)	1.3 (34.3)	6.2 (43.2)	11.6 (52.9)	15.5 (59.9)	19.9 (67.8)	21.9 (71.4)	20.0 (68.0)	14.7 (58.5)	9.4 (48.9)	3.8 (38.8)	0.2 (32.4)	10.3 (50.5)
Source: Climate-Data.org

== See also ==
- Kunduz Province
