= September 2020 Afghanistan attacks =

Series of multiple attacks

- Part of the War in Afghanistan
- Location: Afghanistan
- Date: September 2020
- Attack type: Shooting, bombing
- Weapons: Guns, bombs
- Deaths: 206
- Injuries: 175
- Perpetrator: Taliban

The September 2020 Afghanistan attacks were a series of multiple attacks that occurred in September 2020. Resulting in at least 105 fatalities and another 112 injured. In addition 97 insurgents were killed and another 58 were injured in these attacks.

== Timeline of attacks ==
Date	Location	Dead	Injured	Details
1 September	Gardez, Gardez District, Paktia Province	3 (+2)	5	An attack left at least 3 security forces dead in the city of Gardez in Paktia Province.
3 September	Nangarhar Province	3	1	A mine explosion killed at least 3 people and injured 1 in Nangarhar Province.
6 September	Kandahar, Kandahar Province	0 (+10)	0	Ten Taliban militants were killed during an attack against security forces in Kandahar, no casualties on the security forces side were reported.
7 September	Zhari District, Kandahar Province	1	1	An explosion occurred in Zhari District, Kandahar Province, when a motorcycle hit a mine. The attack left one dead and another injured.
7 September	Faryab Province	0 (+22)	0 (+24)	At least 22 fighters from the Taliban terror group were killed and another 24 were injured after they attacked security forces in Faryab Province.
8 September	Kabul Province	0 (+1)	0 (+2)	One Taliban member was killed and another two were wounded after they attacked security forces in Kabul Province.
9 September	Kabul	10	16	At least 10 people were killed and another 16 were injured in a Kabul bombing.
10 September	Herat Province	0 (+6)	0 (+4)	Six members of the Taliban group were killed and another 4 were injured after they attacked security forces in Herat Province.
10 September	Kandahar Province	0	7	A car bombing injured 7 police in Kandahar Province.
11 September	Khost Province	4	13	A motorcycle bombing occurred in Khost Province. The attack left at least 4 people dead including 2 civilians and 4 soldiers. Another 13 were injured.
13 September	Tagab District, Kapisa, Kapisa Province	5	7	Five police were killed and another 7 were injured in Tagab District, Kapisa, Kapisa Province.
16 September	Kalafgan District, Takhar Province	2	12	A bomb killed 2 and injured 12 others in Kalafgan District, Takhar Province.
16 September	Kabul	1	1	A member of the Afghan National Directorate of Security was shot dead and his driver was injured in Kabul.
17 September	Nangarhar Province	20 (+29)	15 (+25)	Taliban killed 20 security force members and injured another 15 in Nangarhar Province. Around 29 Taliban were killed and another 25 were wounded.
17 September	Herat Province	6 (+53)	Unknown	A Taliban car bombing killed 6 Afghan security force members in Herat Province. 53 militants were also killed in the attack.
17 September	Qadis District, Badghis Province	3 (+2)	10 (+3)	Insurgents from Taliban group killed 3 security force members and injured another 8 in Qadis District, Badghis Province. 2 civilians, 2 Taliban were killed and another 3 were injured
17 September	Gizab District, Uruzgan Province	3	2	Taliban killed at least 3 security force members and injured 2 others in Gizab District, Uruzgan Province.
19 September	Mazar-i-Sharif, Mazar-i-Sharif District, Balkh Province	1	5	A bomb killed one and 5 were injured in Mazar-i-Sharif, Mazar-i-Sharif District, Balkh Province.
19 September	Gardez, Gardez District, Paktia Province	1	0	A gunman killed a man in Gardez, Gardez District, Paktia Province.
19 September	Dedadi District, Balkh Province	1 (+1)	8	A suicide bombing left a security force member dead and 8 others were injured in Dedadi District, Balkh Province.
19 September	Paktika Province	1	0	A security forces member was killed in Paktika Province.
21 September	Kabul	1	3	One child was killed and another 3 people were injured after two mines exploded in Kabul.
22 September	Gizab District, Uruzgan Province	14	0	Insurgents killed at least 14 security force members in Gizab District, Uruzgan Province.
24 September	Patawak, Darayem District, Badakshan Province.	5	1	Taliban killed 5 people including 2 children in Patawak village in Darayem District, Badakshan Province
25 September	Mahmud-i-Raqi, Mahmud Raqi District, Kapisa Province	1	0	A man was shot dead in Mahmud-i-Raqi, Mahmud Raqi District, Kapisa Province.
26 September	Badakhshan Province	1	0	A police commander was killed in Badakhshan Province by the Taliban.
29 September	Dasht-e-Sulaiman, Kajran district, Daykundi Province	14	0	A bomb kills at least 14 people including 5 children in Dasht-e-Sulaiman, Kajran district, Daykundi Province.
30 September	Farang District, Baghlan Province	1	2	Taliban insurgents kill a police officer and another two were injured in Farang District, Baghlan Province.
30 September	Kohistan District, Badakhshan Province	3 (+4)	3 (+5)	At least 3 police were killed and another 3 were injured after Taliban attacked Kohistan District in Badakhshan Province. 4 Taliban were also killed and 5 others were injured in this attack.

== See also ==
- List of mass car bombings
- May 2020 Afghanistan attacks
- June 2020 Afghanistan attacks
- July 2020 Afghanistan attacks
- August 2020 Afghanistan attacks
