= Kunduz District =

Kunduz District د کندز ولسوالۍ ولسوالی قندوز
- District
- Location in Afghanistan
- Coordinates: 36°43′43″N 68°52′5″E
- Country: Afghanistan
- Province: Kunduz Province
- Time zone: UTC+4:30 (Afghanistan Standard Time)

Kunduz District (Pashto (Note: Pashto pronunciation: [d̪ə kun.d̪uz wu.ləs.wɑ.laɪ]): د کندز ولسوالۍ; Dari (Note: Dari pronunciation: [wʊ.lʊs.wɑː.liː.jɪ qʊn.d̪uːz]): ولسوالی قندوز) is situated in the center of Kunduz Province in Northern Afghanistan, around the provincial capital - the city of Kunduz. It borders Chahar dara District to the west, Qalay-I-Zal and Imam Sahib districts to the north, Archi and Khan Abad districts to the east and Ali abad District to the south. The population is 254,100 (2006). The roads are good and all the villages are accessible. There is an airport 8 km South-East from the city.
The agriculture is a major source of income and the land is in very good condition and most of it irrigated. There are other business activities also and the rate of unemployed people is lower than the other districts in the province.
