= 2020 Kabul University attack =

Armed terrorist attack in Kabul, Afghanistan

- Part of the November 2020 Afghanistan attacks
- 2020 Kabul University attack (Kabul)
- Location: 34°31′03″N 69°07′56″E; Kabul, Kabul Province, Islamic Republic of Afghanistan
- Date: 2 November 2020
- Target: Attendees at an Iranian book fair
- Attack type: Mass shooting
- Deaths: 35 (including three attackers)
- Injuries: 50
- Perpetrator: Islamic State of Iraq and the Levant – Khorasan Province
- No. of participants: 2

On 2 November 2020, three gunmen stormed the campus of Kabul University in Kabul, under the former Islamic Republic of Afghanistan, killing 32 people and wounding 50 others. The attack began around the time that government officials were expected to arrive at the campus for the opening of an Iranian book fair. The three gunmen were later killed during an exchange of fire with the security forces. The attack occurred at around 11:00 A.M. The Islamic State of Iraq and the Levant – Khorasan Province (ISIL-KP) claimed responsibility.

The attack came after months of increased tensions between the Afghan government, the Taliban, and ISIL-affiliated fighters.

== Background ==
The University of Kabul has been one of Afghanistan's largest institutions of higher education, with a student body of 22,000. The university had previously been attacked in July 2019 when a bomb explosion killed nine people outside the university gates. Just over a week before the November 2020 attack on the university, a suicide bomber had killed 30 people at another educational institution in Kabul.

On the day of the attack the university was hosting an international bookfair. Several Afghan government officials and the Iranian ambassador to Afghanistan were expected to attend the event.

== Attack ==
The attack began on the morning of 2 November at around 11:00 A.M. A group of armed gunmen detonated an explosive at the gate to the university's grounds, after which they entered the compound, killing bystanders and later taking around 35 hostages. Many students were able to escape the attack by climbing over the university's perimeter walls, while those trapped in buildings were forced to shelter in place. Some of the wounded from the attack were evacuated to nearby Ali Abad hospital.

Kabul police and Afghan army special forces were dispatched to the university and set up a perimeter around the site, after which they engaged in a building-by-building sweep of the grounds over the next few hours. American and Danish soldiers as well as Norwegian special forces also responded to the attack.

Following the attack, SITE Intelligence Group reported that the regional branch of the Islamic State of Iraq and the Levant (ISIL) had claimed responsibility for the killings. The Afghan Taliban denied responsibility for the attack, though one Afghan government official attributed it to the group.

== Casualties ==
Thirty-five people were killed and more than 50 others were injured. The majority of the victims were students at the university, who were all part of the public administration facility. Afghanistan's TOLOnews described the deaths as Afghanistan "losing its talented youth" as many of the victims were reportedly among the top performers in their classes.

== Reactions ==
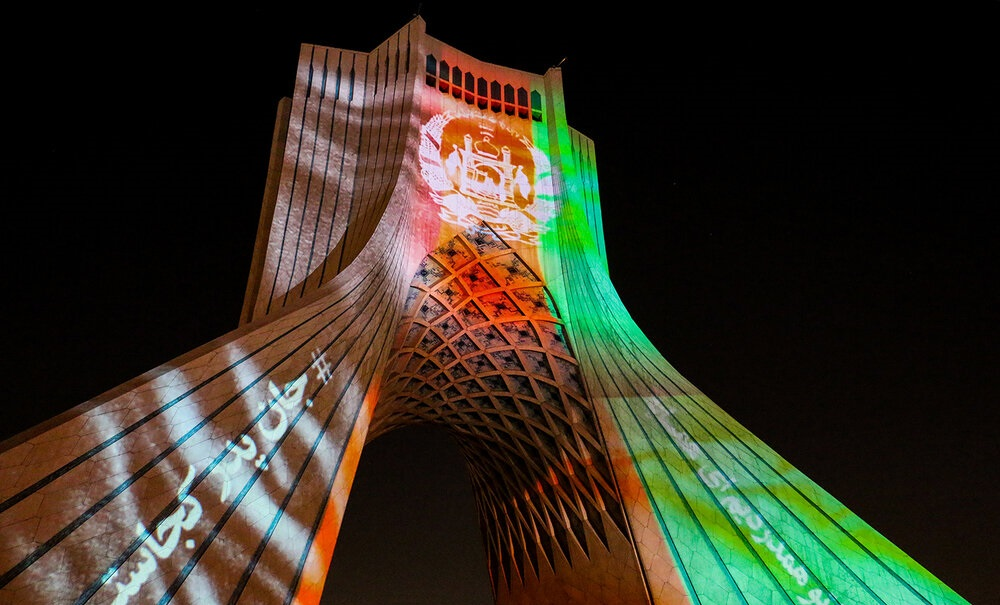
Tehran's Azadi Tower illuminated as memorials to the attack

The attack was widely condemned both nationally and internationally. The presidential spokesman said "terrorists" were "attacking academic centers after they were defeated in Helmand". First Vice President Amrullah Saleh tweeted "One day we will correct our intelligence failures. But the Talibs, their likeminded satanic allies in the next door won’t be ever able to wash their conscience of this stinking and non-justifiable attack on Kabul University." Former President Hamid Karzai called it an "unforgivable crime". Saad Mohseni of Tolo News described the attack as "These animals are killing our children." The Afghan government declared the day after the attack to be a national day of mourning.

Saleh admitted that the attack was an intelligence failure and he faced backlash after blaming the attack on the Taliban, who, in response, denied it.

Both Pakistan and India condemned the attack, as did other countries, the United Nations Security Council, and UN Secretary General António Guterres.

Students from the university told local press the next day that the attack would not deter them from pursuing their education.

In the aftermath of the attack, first responders found the phone of a student who had an unread message from her father, reading Jan-e-pedar, kujasti? (جان پدر کجاستی؟ = Father's dearest, where are you?). Soon after, this message began trending on social media, and Iranian classical singer, Homayoun Shajarian decided to dedicate a song to those killed in the attack. A month earlier his own father, a legendary Iranian classical singer, Mohammed Reza Shajarian, died in Jam Hospital in Tehran. With the approaching one-year anniversary of the Ukrainian International Airlines Flight 752 coming up on January 8, Shajarian decided to dedicate the song to all who had lost their innocent loved ones recently. The story of Souvashoun draws on classical Persian figure Siyavash, commonly regarded as a symbol of innocence.

On August 27, 2021, a United States drone killed one of the suspects in the 2021 Kabul airport attack and an ISIL-KP collaborator involved in the university attack.

== See also ==
- List of terrorist attacks in Kabul
