= Ghazni District =

District of Afghanistan

Coordinates: 33°32′54.1″N 68°25′16.1″E

Ghazni District غزنی
- District
- Location within Afghanistan
- Country: Afghanistan
- Province: Ghazni

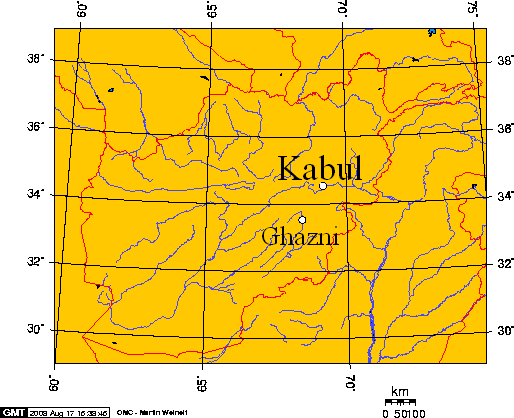
Ghazni and Kabul -- Afghanistan.

Ghazni District (Pashto: د غزني ولسوالۍ Dari: ولسوالی غزنی), is a district of Ghazni province, Afghanistan situated in the northeast part of the province. Capital of the district is Ghazni, which is also capital of Ghazni Province.

== Demographics & Population ==
Like in the rest of Afghanistan, no exact population numbers are available. The Afghan Ministry of Rural Rehabilitation & Development (MRRD) along with UNHCR and Central Statistics Office (CSO) of Afghanistan estimates the population of the district to be around 154,618. According to AIMS and UNHCR, Hazaras make up 50% of the population, followed by Tajiks and Pashtuns, 50%.

== Security and Politics ==
It was reported that Afghan and ISAF forces combined and killed several militants and captured an al-Qaeda IED facilitator and another incident on the southern side of Ghazni City.

== See also ==
- Districts of Afghanistan
