= Khan Abad District =

Khan Abad District ولسوالی خان‌آباد
- District
- Location in Afghanistan
- Country: Afghanistan
- Province: Kunduz Province
- Time zone: UTC+4:30 (Afghanistan Standard Time)

Khan Abad District (ولسوالی خان‌آباد) is situated in the eastern part of Kunduz Province, Afghanistan. It borders Kunduz District to the west, Archi District to the northeast, Takhar Province to the east and Ali abad District to the south. The population is 140,600 (2006): 40% Pashtun, 20% Hazara, 25% Tajik, 10% Uzbek and 5% Pashai. The district center is the town of Khan Abad, located in the central part of the district.

Many houses were destroyed during the wars. Landmines are a serious problem affecting rehabilitation. The drought has not affected this district and the condition of the land is very good and most of it is irrigated. Farming is the main source of income.

== Security and politics ==
It was reported that Afghan National Security Forces eliminated two Taliban Group commanders, Mullah Noorullah and Abdul Haq, who were apparently in charge of Taliban activities in the province.
