= Dasht-e-Archi District =

Archi District ولسوالی ارچی
- District
- Location in Afghanistan
- Country: Afghanistan
- Province: Kunduz Province
- Time zone: UTC+4:30 (Afghanistan Standard Time)

The Archi District (Pashto: د آرچي ولسوالۍ), also known as Dasht-i-Archi, is situated in the northeastern part of Kunduz Province in Afghanistan. It borders with Khan Abad and Kunduz districts to the south-west, Imam Sahib District to the north-west, Tajikistan to the north and Takhar Province to the east.

The population is 74,900 (2006) - 40% Pashtun, 15% Tajik, 35% Uzbek, and 10% Turkmen.

The district center is the town of Archi, located in the northern part of the district.

The district is generally poor and seriously affected during the wars.
