= July 2020 Afghanistan attacks =

Part of the War in Afghanistan

- Part of the War in Afghanistan
- July 2020 Afghanistan attacks (Afghanistan)
- Location: Ghazni Province; Kunduz Province; Nangarhar Province
- Date: July 2020
- Deaths: 6 in Ghazni Province; 14 in Kunduz Province; 4 in Nangarhar Province
- Injuries: 8 in Ghazni Province; 11 in Nangarhar Province

In a continuation of previous attacks by the Taliban in May and June, multiple clashes between Afghan security forces and the Taliban were reported. They carried out several attacks throughout Afghanistan, resulting in multiple fatalities on both sides. Both the Taliban and government forces have accused each other responsibility over the recent surge in violence across Afghanistan. The attacks come despite the signing of a peace deal with the U.S. in February that was intended to put an end to the war.

However, the peace talks stalled following disagreements over the implementation of the release and exchange of Taliban prisoners, who the Taliban claimed were being re-captured after being released by the government. The Afghan government denied this, claiming this was "incorrect". The peace deal has called for the eventual release of 5,000 Taliban militants currently being detained by the Afghan government and the release of 1,000 captive government personnel.

As of July 26, the Afghan government has freed around 5,000 Taliban prisoners but has slowed the further release of militants following concerns that the released inmates were returning to the battlefield.

== Background ==
On 29 February 2020, the U.S. signed a peace agreement with the Taliban in Qatar, which set the conditions for the withdrawal of U.S. troops from Afghanistan. However, despite the agreement, attacks against Afghan security forces surged in the country. In the 45 days after the agreement (between 1 March and 15 April), the Taliban conducted more than 4,500 attacks in Afghanistan, which showed an increase of more than 70% as compared to the same period in the previous year. More than 900 Afghan security forces were killed in the period, up from about 520 in the same period a year earlier. Meanwhile, because of a significant reduction in the number of offensives and airstrikes by Afghan and U.S. forces against the Taliban due to the agreement, Taliban casualties dropped to 610 in the period down from about 1,660 in the same period a year earlier. The Pentagon spokesman, Jonathan Hoffman, said that although the Taliban stopped conducting attacks against the U.S.-led coalition forces in Afghanistan, the violence was still "unacceptably high" and "not conducive to a diplomatic solution."

== Attacks ==
On July 8, four police officers were killed and 11 more wounded in Nangarhar Province by a Taliban suicide bomber. On July 11, six civilians were killed and another eight wounded in Ghazni Province by a suspected Taliban roadside bomb. The next day on July 12, Taliban insurgents attacked multiple checkpoints in Kunduz Province, killing at least 14 members of the Afghan security forces.

On July 13, the Taliban attacked a compound used by Afghanistan's intelligence agency in Aybak District, Samangan Province, with a suicide car bomb and two gunmen. At least 11 intelligence agency personnel were killed in addition to all three attackers. A further 63 people were wounded as a result of the attack. On July 14, five civilians were killed and another 11 wounded in Kabul when their car hit a suspected Taliban roadside bomb. In a separate incident in Faryab Province, four people were killed after the Taliban opened fire on them while they were praying inside a mosque.

On July 15, seven police officers were killed and another six wounded in Kandahar Province after an attack by the Taliban on a security checkpoint. Two days later on July 17, nine people were wounded by a Taliban bomb in Baghlan Province. This was followed by a similar incident the next day in which three civilian were killed while riding on their motorcycle in Badghis Province as a result of a Taliban bomb. On July 19, two soldiers were killed after Taliban gunmen opened fire on them while they were traveling on a motorcycle in Kabul. On the same day in Paktika Province, four police officers were killed by a Taliban bomb.

In an early attack in Kunduz Province on July 20, 13 security personnel were killed and a further 10 wounded when their checkpoint was attacked by multiple Taliban gunmen. On the same day, eight soldiers were killed and another nine wounded after a Taliban suicide bomber struck their convoy in Maidan Wardak Province, Central Afghanistan. On July 21, eight soldiers were killed when their Humvee struck a Taliban IED in Uruzgan Province. This was followed by an attack on a checkpoint on July 22 in Kandahar Province, which resulted in the deaths of seven security personnel. In a separate bomb incident, at least three police officers in Tarinkot, Uruzgan Province, were killed on July 29. On 30 July 2020 in clashes with security forces, nine Taliban militants, including two leaders, were killed by security forces in Ghazni Province.

=== Puli Alam suicide car bombing ===
Also on 30 July 2020, a suicide car bombing occurred in Puli Alam, a city in Logar Province, Afghanistan. It killed 17 people and wounded 21 others according to AFP, the Ministry of Defense claimed 8 people died and 30 people were injured. It targeted Afghan security forces and occurred when there were many shoppers in the vicinity. On the day of the bombing, the Taliban said that they are not responsible for it.

== Reactions ==
In response to the increased violence that began in May and continued into July, Afghani President Ashraf Ghani said, “The window of opportunity is narrowing, as Afghan women and men are seeing the continuation of carnage instead of a peace dividend.”
