= Imam Sahib District =

Imam Sahib District ولسوالی امام‌صاحب
- District
- Location of Imam Sahib in Kunduz Province
- Coordinates: 37.1820°N 68.9172°E
- Country: Afghanistan
- Province: Kunduz

Population (2021)
  - Total: 232,846
- Time zone: UTC+4:30 (Afghanistan Standard Time)

Imam Sahib District (ولسوالی امام‌صاحب) is situated in the northern part of Kunduz Province, Afghanistan. It borders with Qalay-I-Zal District to the west, Tajikistan to the north (along the Panj river), with Archi District to the east and Kunduz District to the south. It has an estimated population of 232,846 as of 2021, which include ethnic Uzbeks at 45%, Pashtuns at 25%, Tajiks at 25% and Hazaras at 1%. The district center is the town of Imam Sahib, located in the northern part of the district. The other main town in the district is Sher Khan Bandar, which serves as Afghanistan's main port of entry to Tajikistan.

The district is one of the richest in Afghanistan. The land is very fertile and well irrigated and has not suffered drought. The medical and educational facilities are better than in other districts of Kunduz.

== Security and Politics ==
The area has been the home to many Taliban figures including one of the Taliban's regional leaders Mullah Salam. According to some reports, Imam Sahib district was controlled by Salam, whose influence extends to Baghlan, Takhar and the Tajikistan border region. His fighters were said to control several districts in Kunduz.

On 22 November 2009 it was reported that a group of militants in the Taj Gozar area attacked a police checkpoint, where 3 militants were supposedly killed.
