= Kunduz =

City in Kunduz Province, Afghanistan

Kunduz: کندز (Pashto); قندوز (Dari)
- Provincial city
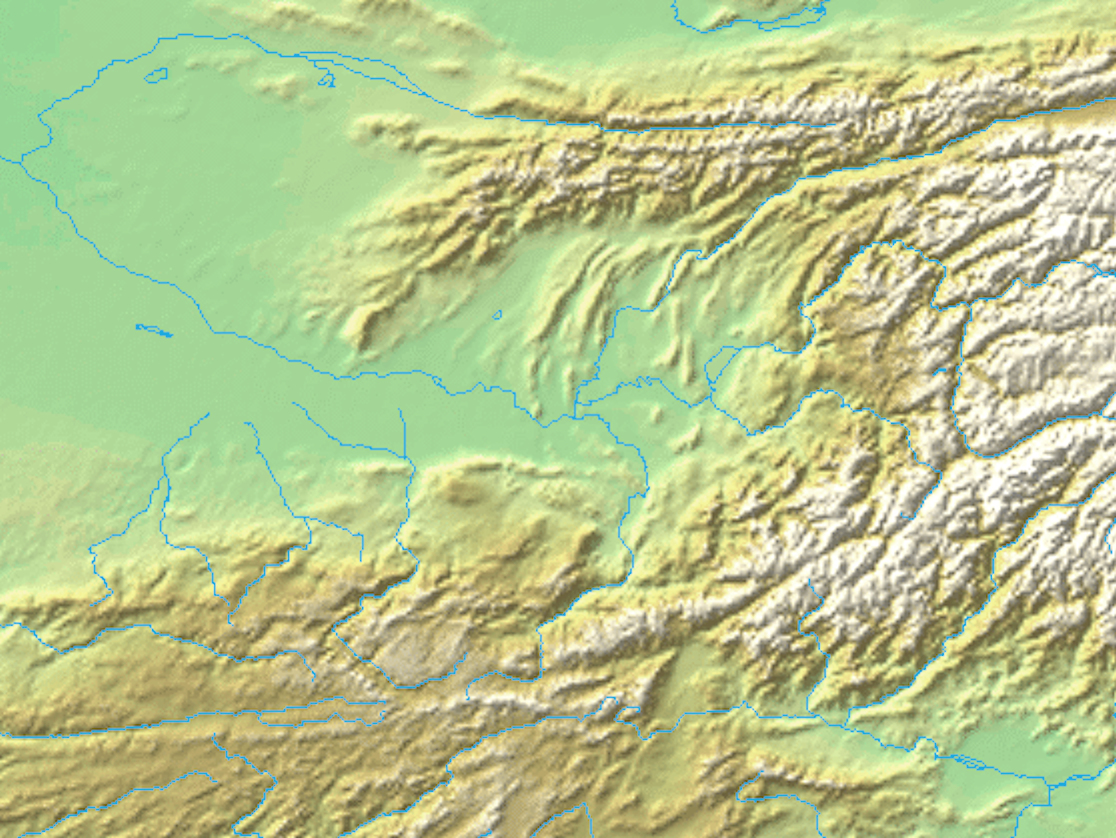
- Location in Afghanistan Kunduz (Bactria) Kunduz (West and Central Asia)
- Coordinates: 36°43′43″N 68°52′5″E
- Country: Afghanistan
- Province: Kunduz
- District: Kunduz
- First mention: 329 BCE

Government
  - Type: Municipality
  - Mayor: Mawlavi Gul Mohammad Elyas

Area
  - Provincial city: 11,206 ha (27,690 acres)
  - Land: 112 km^{2} (43 sq mi)
- Elevation: 351 m (1,152 ft)

Population (2025)
  - Provincial city: 413,996
  - Urban: 221,932
  - Rural: 192,064
- Time zone: UTC+04:30 (Afghanistan Time)
- Postal code: 35XX
- ISO 3166 code: AF-KDZ
- Climate: BSk

Kunduz, (Note: /kʊnduːz/) (Note: Pashto: کندز, romanized: Kunduz [kun.d̪uz]; Dari: قندوز, romanized: Qundūz [qʊn̪.d̪úːz]) also written as Qunduz, is a city in northern Afghanistan, serving as the capital of Kunduz Province. It is within the jurisdiction of Kunduz District and has an estimated population of 413,996 people as of September 2025. Mawlavi Gul Mohammad Elyas is the mayor of the city.

Kunduz has a domestic airport and an industrial park, including a growing number of public parks, markets, hospitals, mosques, universities, guesthouses and restaurants. The Kunduz University is located in the middle part of the city.

Kunduz is in the historical Tokharistan region of Bactria, near the confluence of the Kunduz River with the Khanabad River. The city is linked by a road network with Imam Sahib to the north, Taloqan to the east, Baghlan to the south, Mazar-i-Sharif to the west, and Sher Khan Bandar to the northwest. Many foreign tourists coming from Tajikistan pass through the city.

== Etymology ==
Kunduz is also sometimes spelled (romanized) as Kundûz, Qonduz, Qondûz, Konduz, Kondûz, Kondoz, or Qhunduz. The name of the city is believed to have derived from the Persian compound, kohan dež, "old/ancient fort".

== Geography ==
Kunduz is located in the northern part of Afghanistan, near southern Tajikistan. It is at an altitude of 351 m (1,152 ft) above sea level and surrounded by vast farmlands. Kunduz is a strategic city that connects many other Afghan cities and towns. It is administratively divided into about 8 city districts ('nahias') with a total land area of 112 km^{2} (43 sq mi) or 11,206 ha (27,690 acres).

Land use of the city (within the municipal boundary) is largely agricultural (65.8% of total area). Residential land comprises nearly half of the 'built-up' land area (48.3%) with 29,877 dwellings. Institutional land comprises 17.9% of built-up land use, given that the airport is within the municipal boundary.

=== Climate ===
Kunduz has a cold semi-arid climate (Köppen climate classification BSk) with hot summers and cool winters. Precipitation is generally low except from January to April, with summers almost always rainless.

Climate data for Kunduz
Month	Jan	Feb	Mar	Apr	May	Jun	Jul	Aug	Sep	Oct	Nov	Dec	Year
Record high °C (°F)	21.2 (70.2)	25.0 (77.0)	32.8 (91.0)	38.9 (102.0)	42.2 (108.0)	46.2 (115.2)	45.3 (113.5)	44.2 (111.6)	39.2 (102.6)	39.4 (102.9)	28.4 (83.1)	21.6 (70.9)	46.2 (115.2)
Mean daily maximum °C (°F)	6.3 (43.3)	9.5 (49.1)	15.8 (60.4)	23.0 (73.4)	29.8 (85.6)	37.3 (99.1)	39.0 (102.2)	36.9 (98.4)	31.8 (89.2)	24.5 (76.1)	16.0 (60.8)	9.7 (49.5)	23.3 (73.9)
Daily mean °C (°F)	1.6 (34.9)	4.4 (39.9)	10.4 (50.7)	17.2 (63.0)	22.9 (73.2)	29.3 (84.7)	31.3 (88.3)	29.2 (84.6)	23.9 (75.0)	16.9 (62.4)	9.5 (49.1)	4.4 (39.9)	16.8 (62.1)
Mean daily minimum °C (°F)	−2.4 (27.7)	0.0 (32.0)	5.7 (42.3)	11.6 (52.9)	15.7 (60.3)	20.9 (69.6)	23.3 (73.9)	21.5 (70.7)	16.3 (61.3)	10.6 (51.1)	4.1 (39.4)	0.0 (32.0)	10.6 (51.1)
Record low °C (°F)	−22.7 (−8.9)	−23.1 (−9.6)	−11.8 (10.8)	−2.1 (28.2)	4.2 (39.6)	12.5 (54.5)	15.7 (60.3)	12.6 (54.7)	3.5 (38.3)	−2.0 (28.4)	−9.8 (14.4)	−20 (−4)	−23.1 (−9.6)
Average precipitation mm (inches)	44.0 (1.73)	56.5 (2.22)	76.7 (3.02)	54.4 (2.14)	29.8 (1.17)	0.1 (0.00)	1.3 (0.05)	0.3 (0.01)	0.1 (0.00)	7.3 (0.29)	23.7 (0.93)	28.4 (1.12)	322.6 (12.68)
Average rainy days	5	6	11	10	9	1	1	0	0	3	5	6	57
Average snowy days	5	4	2	0	0	0	0	0	0	0	1	2	14
Average relative humidity (%)	80	75	75	71	54	31	28	29	32	44	63	76	55
Mean monthly sunshine hours	114.4	114.6	158.9	201.0	276.5	332.1	340.2	315.5	289.7	221.8	169.3	118.3	2,652.3
Source: NOAA (1958–1983)

== History ==
Kunduz is believed to be the site of the ancient city of Drapsaka. It was a great centre of Buddhist learning and very prosperous during the 3rd century AD.

The city used to be called Aornos (Bactrian: οαρνο, romanized: warn) and later Walwalij or Varvaliz, a compound of the old name Warn and Bactrian: λιζο, romanized: lizo, lit. 'fortress'. The name Kuhandiz began to be used from the time of the Timurid Empire, before the 16h century.

In the 18th century the region became part of the Durrani Empire. Kunduz served as a capital of an Uzbek Khanate which reached its largest extent, from Balkh to the Pamir Mountains, during the reign of Mohammad Murad Beg (1815–1842). Murad Beg faced the decline of his rule after being defeated by Dost Mohammad Khan. After Murad's death, the Khanate declined and was eventually subjugated by the Emirate of Afghanistan in 1859.

=== 19th and 20th century Pashtun colonization ===
During the late 19th century, Emir Abdur Rahman Khan (the "Iron Amir") initiated a systematic policy of Pashtun colonization of northern Afghanistan, forcibly and voluntarily relocating thousands of Pashtun families from southern and eastern tribal areas into the multi-ethnic Kunduz Province. This state-sponsored internal resettlement strategy served multiple purposes: it fortified the central state's authority over the historically autonomous Uzbek semi-independent khanates and Tajik populations, The strategic deportations of Ghilzaifamilies following their 1887 revolt dismantling their regional power base and shattering tribal cohesion demographic concentration of local non-Pashtun communities to mitigate regional rebellions, and placed loyal populations along the contested northern frontiers near the Russian border. Concurrently, the state utilized the region to exile political opponents and rival tribal leaders away from the capital.

In the early 20th century, between 100 and 200,000 Tajiks and Uzbeks fled the conquest of their homeland (now southern Tajikistan) by the Soviet Red Army and settled in northern Afghanistan.

In the early 20th century, under the governance of Sher Khan Nashir, Kunduz became one of the wealthiest Afghan provinces. This was mainly due to Nasher's founding of the Spinzar Cotton Company, which is state-owned and still operational to the present day. At its peak, the Spinzar Cotton Company employed 5,000 people full time. Kunduz is the most important agricultural province which produces wheat, rice, millet, and other products and obtained the nickname of "the hive of the country."

=== 21st century ===
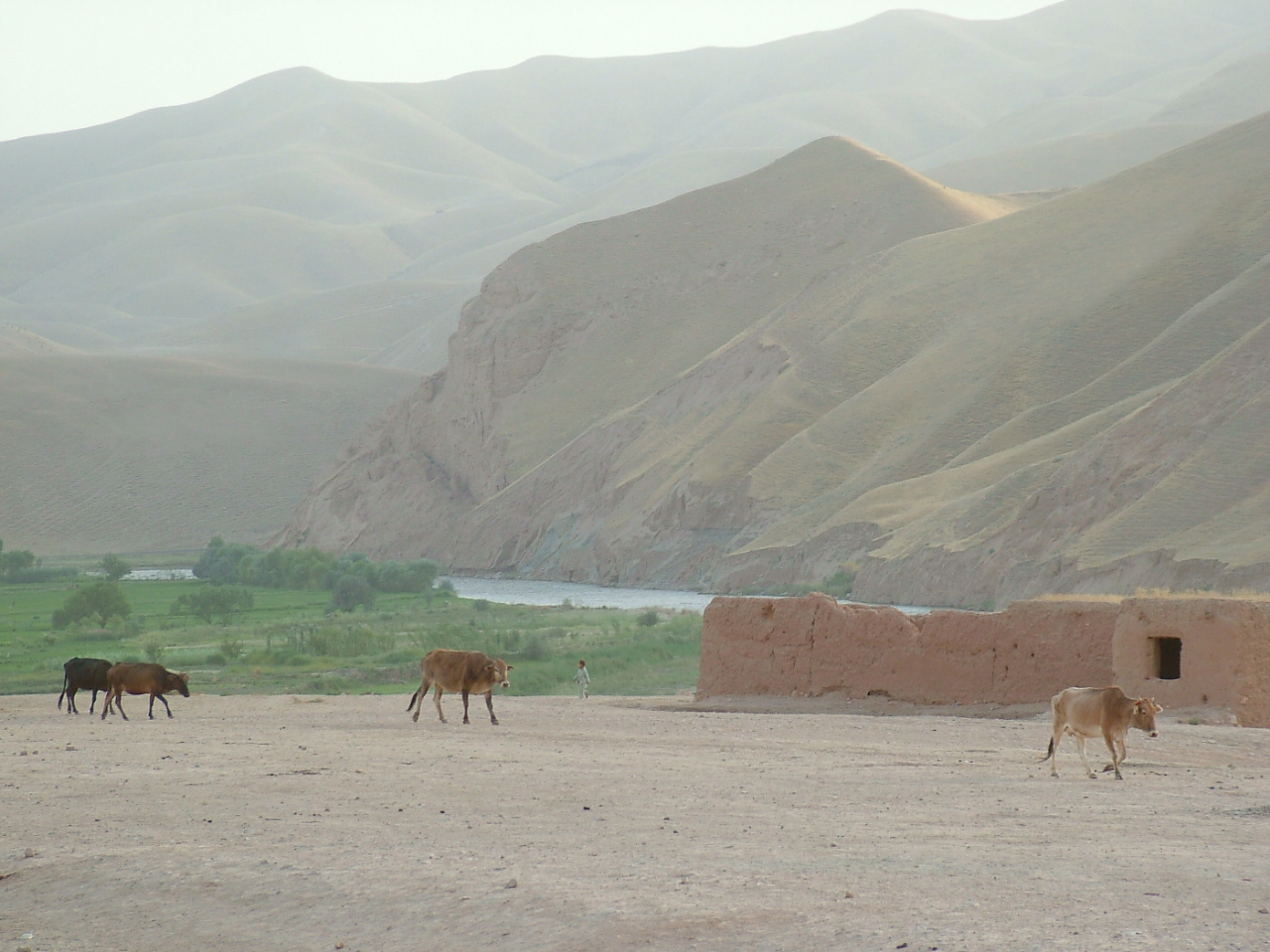
A scenery in the rural part of Kunduz province in 2005

Kunduz is the center for the northeast provinces and was captured by the Taliban in 1997. It was the last major city held by the Taliban before its fall to US-backed Afghan Northern Alliance forces on 26 November 2001. NATO forces killed over 100 civilians in the 2009 Kunduz airstrike. During the summer of 2015, the Taliban advanced and attacked the city, which resulted in a battle for control of the city against US-funded Afghan Armed Forces. Tens of thousands of inhabitants were displaced internally by the fighting. On 28 September 2015 the Taliban flag was again raised in the city center and the Taliban managed to capture the city prison and free many prisoners. On 3 October 2015, a United States Air Force AC-130U gunship attacked the Kunduz Trauma Centre operated by Médecins Sans Frontières (MSF, or Doctors Without Borders). The US-backed Afghan forces counter-attacked and managed to re-capture the city in 15 days. The Taliban announced that, after achieving their objectives, they have withdrawn from the city's center. Zabiullah Mujahid, a Taliban spokesperson, said that their main object in leaving the city is to avoid civilian casualties from air raids. In April 2018 the Afghan Air Force conducted an airstrike that killed and injured dozens of civilians at a religious school in Kunduz. On 31 August 2019, the Taliban forces launched another attack on the city, setting off a major battle with local security forces.

On 19 May 2020, the Taliban killed one policeman and one civilian and injured 18 others in a motorbike bomb blast in Kunduz. On the same day, the Taliban attempted to re-capture Kunduz, attacking several government posts but were repelled by the Afghan security forces. The Taliban were forced to flee the city, leaving ten dead bodies behind. Eight Afghan soldiers and three civilians were killed and 55 others were wounded during the Taliban attack.

On 8 August 2021, the Taliban as part of their nationwide military offensive fully captured Kunduz, along with Sar-e-Pul and Taloqan after heavy clashes with Afghan forces.

On 8 October 2021, a militant of ISKP detonated a suicide vest targeting Shia worshippers at the Gozar-e-Sayed Abad Mosque, killing 50+ people and wounding over 100.

== Demographics ==
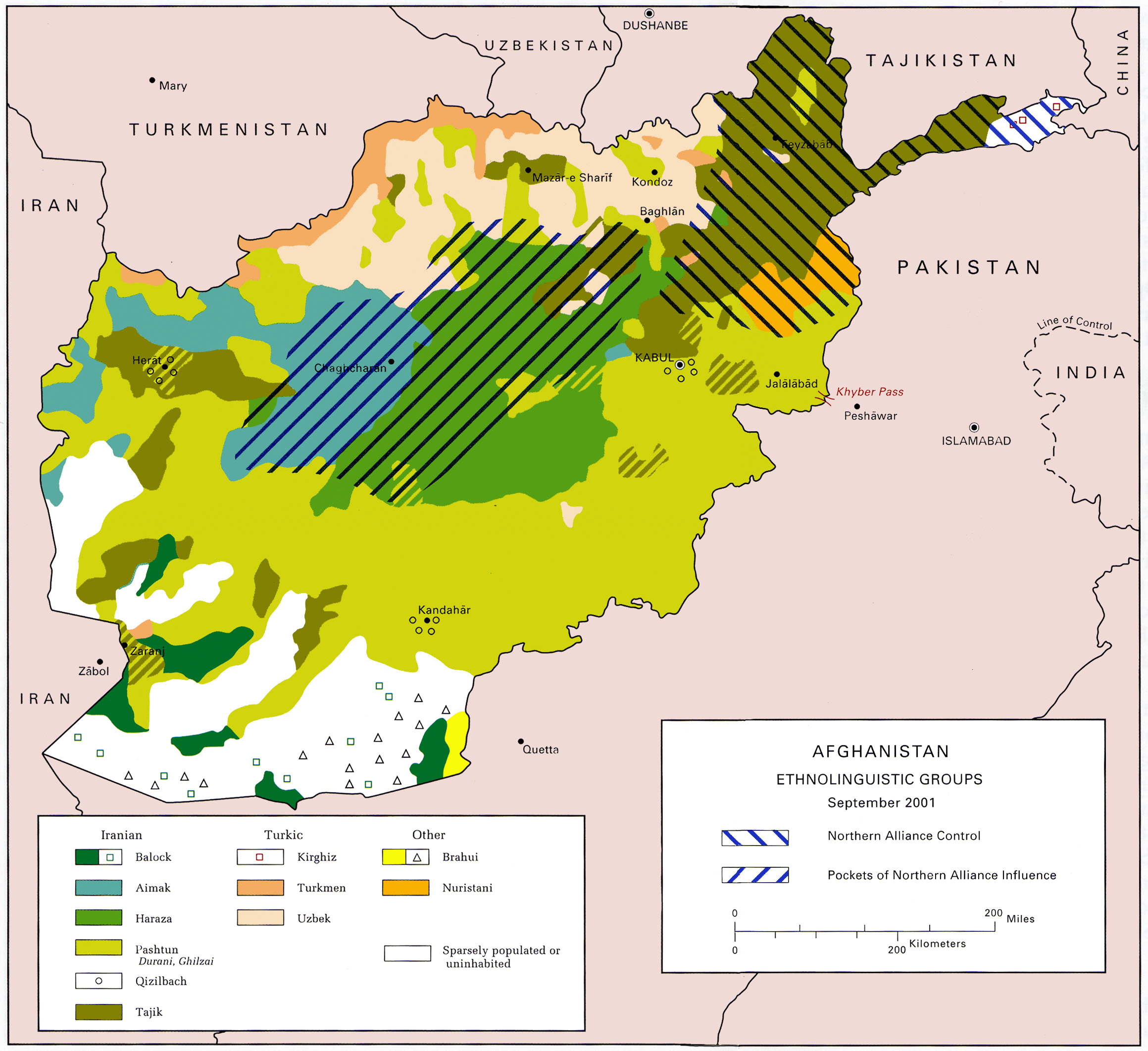
Ethnolinguistic groups of Afghanistan

The Kunduz municipality has an estimated population of 413,996 people. Ethnically, they are Pashtuns followed by Uzbeks, Tajiks, Arabs and a few others. The Pashtuns became the majority after the Pashtun colonization of northern Afghanistan in the late 19th century.

The Arabs of Kunduz speak Dari and Pashto, Afghanistan's two official languages, rather than Arabic. However, they claim a strong Arab identity, based on their tribal origins in the Arabian Peninsula. This may point to the seventh-century and later migration to this area of many Arab tribes, especially in the wake of the Muslim conquests of Afghanistan.

== Economy ==
The economy of Kunduz is mainly based on agriculture, trade, transport, and tourism. The city has a domestic airport and a small industrial park. Many residents of Kunduz go to work in Kabul and other Afghan cities.

== Sports ==
The most popular sports in Kunduz are cricket, football, futsal, volleyball and buzkashi.

Professional sports teams from Kunduz

Club	League	Sport	Venue	Established
Pamir Zalmi	Shpageeza Cricket League	Cricket	Kunduz Cricket Ground	2021
Mawjhai Amu F.C.	Afghan Premier League	Football	Kunduz Football Stadium	2012

Stadiums

- Kunduz Cricket Ground
- Kunduz Football Stadium

== Notable people ==
- Sher Khan Nasher, politician and entrepreneur
- Sayed Noorullah Murad, politician, military commander and scholar
- Gulbudin Hekmatyar, politician and former commander in the Afghan mujahideen
- Hamidullah Yousafzai, football player who played for Afghanistan national football team
- Javed Ahmadi, cricket player of the Afghanistan national cricket team
- Aziza Ahmadyar, politician and women's rights activist.
- Abdul Rauf Ibrahimi, former speaker of Afghan Parliament
- Farhad Darya, Afghan singer

== See also ==
- List of cities in Afghanistan
