= June 2020 Afghanistan attacks =

Part of the War in Afghanistan

- Part of the War in Afghanistan
- June 2020 Afghanistan attacks (Afghanistan)
- Location: Badakhshan Province; Kabul Province; Helmand Province
- Date: 6–29 June 2020
- Deaths: 15 in Badakhshan Province; 7 in Kabul Province; 23+ in Helmand Province
- Injuries: 8 in Kabul Province

In June 2020, insurgents and the Taliban carried out attacks throughout Afghanistan in a continuation of attacks carried out in May.

== Attacks ==
On June 5, 2020, 10 policemen were killed in attacks in Zabul province. The next day on June 6, a roadside bomb killed 11 members of the Afghan security forces when their vehicle hit a bomb. The Afghan soldiers were responding to attacks on checkpoints in Khash District, Badakhshan Province, when their vehicle hit the bomb. According to the spokesman for Badakhshan's provincial police chief Sanaullah Rohani, a local commander and four militants were among those killed in the attack. In a separate incident on the same day, three police officers were killed in a shootout in Guldara District, Kabul Province.

On 12 June 2020, a Sunni mosque in Kabul was bombed, killing four people and injuring another eight. On 17 June, twelve security forces members were killed and five were wounded during a Taliban attack in Aqcha District, Jowzjan Province. Four soldiers were taken hostage in the attack, and five Taliban militants killed. Two security checkpoints in the Aqcha district were hit from different angles by the attackers, in an attempt to take over their control, a spokesman in the Jawzjan province confirmed. However, the actual extent of casualties are yet to be ascertained, as the group behind the attack has not issued a statement yet. Over a week later on June 29, at least 23 people were killed in rocket attacks on a cattle market in Sangin District, Helmand Province. Both the government and the Taliban blamed each other for the attack.
