= Kunduz Province =

Province of Afghanistan

Kunduz قندوز
- Province
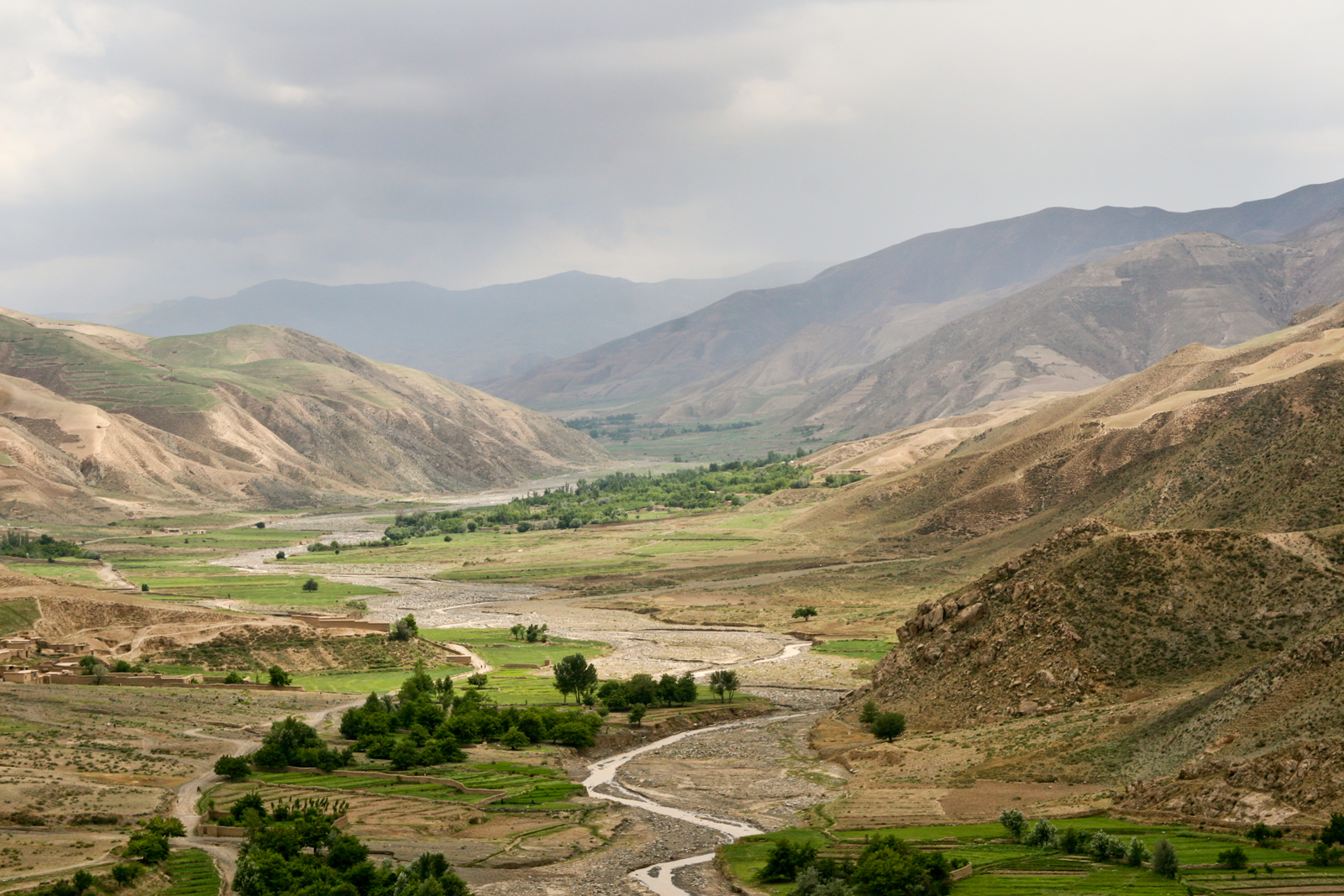
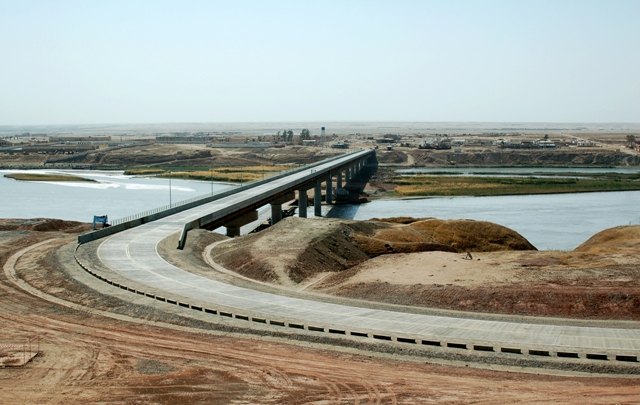
- From the top, Kunduz River Valley, Char Dara District, Afghanistan-Tajikistan Bridge

- Map of Afghanistan with Kunduz highlighted
- Coordinates (Capital): 36.8°N 68.8°E
- Country: Afghanistan
- Capital: Kunduz

Government
  - Governor: Vacant
  - Deputy Governor: Habib-ur-Rehman Sohaib
  - Police Chief: Azizullah

Area
  - Total: 8,080 km^{2} (3,120 sq mi)

Population (2020)
  - Total: 1,136,677
  - Density: 141/km^{2} (364/sq mi)
- Time zone: UTC+4:30 (Afghanistan Time)
- Postal code: 35xx
- ISO 3166 code: AF-KDZ
- Main languages: Pashto; Dari; Uzbek; Turkmen

Kunduz, (Note: Pashto: Pashto pronunciation: [zɑˈbəl]: کندز Dari: Dari pronunciation: [zɑː.bʊ́l]: کندز) also known as Qunduz, is one of the 34 provinces of Afghanistan, located in the northern part of the country next to Tajikistan. The population of the province is around 1,136,677, which is mostly a tribal society; it is one of Afghanistan's most ethnically diverse provinces with many different ethnicities in large numbers living there. The city of Kunduz serves as the capital of the province. It borders the provinces of Takhar, Baghlan, Samangan and Balkh, as well as the Khatlon Region of Tajikistan. The Kunduz Airport is located next to the provincial capital.

The Kunduz River valley dominates the Kunduz Province. The river flows irregularly from south to north into the Amu Darya river which forms the border between Afghanistan and Tajikistan. A newly constructed bridge crosses the Amu Darya at Sherkhan Bandar and the international trade is a large source of Kunduz's economy. The river, its tributaries, and derivative canals provide irrigation to the irrigated fields that dominate land usage in the agricultural province. There are also rain-fed fields and open range land that span several miles. Kunduz was once a major economic center for Afghanistan, but the wars since 1978 have changed fortunes for the province. Initially during the War in Afghanistan (2001-2021), Kunduz was one of the more stable regions of Afghanistan, but during the 2010s quickly turned into one of the most unstable provinces of the country, resulting in large parts falling under Taliban insurgent control. In 2021, the Taliban gained control of the province during their nationwide summer offensive.

== History ==
The area has been part of many empires in the past. It became part of the Afghan Durrani Empire in the mid-18th century. It saw a major migration from Russian Turkestan in the north during the early 1920s. During the governance of Sher Khan Nasher, Kunduz became one of the wealthiest of Afghanistan's provinces, mainly due to Nasher's founding of the Spinzar Cotton Company, which continues to exist in post-war Afghanistan in the early 20th century.

Between 100,000 and 200,000 Tajiks and Uzbeks fled the conquest of their homeland by Russian Red Army and settled in northern Afghanistan.

The province witnessed much violence and fighting during the Soviet–Afghan War.

During the war in Afghanistan Kunduz was captured by NATO forces. In November 2001, members of the Taliban and Al-Qaeda, along with Pakistani military personnel and Afghan sympathizers were airlifted to Pakistan to evade NATO capture in the Kunduz Airlift.

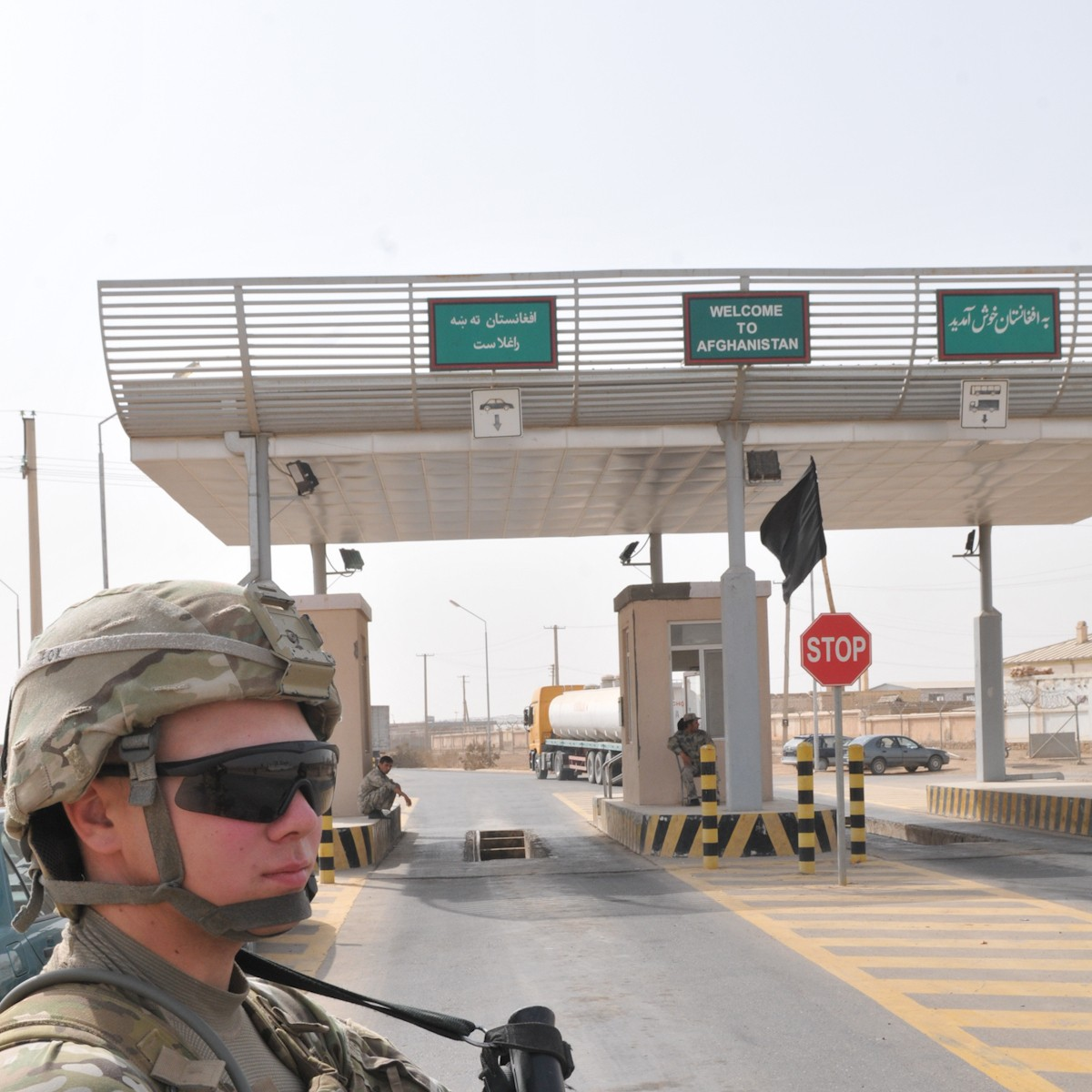
Sherkhan Bandar, located in the Imam Sahib District of Kunduz province, is the border crossing between Afghanistan and neighboring Tajikistan.

Germany had 4,000 soldiers stationed in the NATO-ISAF Kunduz province Provincial Reconstruction Team, along with Regional Command North. The province was largely peaceful until Taliban militants started infiltrating the area in 2009.

On 4 September 2009, the German commander called in an American jet fighter, which attacked two NATO fuel trucks, which had been captured by insurgents. More than 90 people died, among them at least 40 civilians, who had gathered to collect fuel.

It was reported that on 21 November 2009, a bomb going off along the Takhar Kunduz highway killed a child and injured two others.

The governor, Mohammad Omar, was killed by a bomb on 8 October 2010.

On 10 February 2011, a suicide bomber killed a district governor and six other people in the district of Chardara in Kunduz Province, where the insurgency is well entrenched.

As part of the Taliban's resurgence in northern Afghanistan, Kunduz has been increasingly affected by war and instability. The Taliban after their ouster did not gain a foothold in Kunduz Province until 2009, but since then their influence expanded and they eventually captured the capital city of Kunduz briefly in 2015 and 2016. As of 2021, many parts are under Taliban control. Since the mid-2010s and in 2021 many residents have been forced to flee the province to places like Kabul or across the border to Tajikistan.

On 8 August 2021, the Taliban regained control of Kunduz City according to local sources.

== Administrative divisions ==
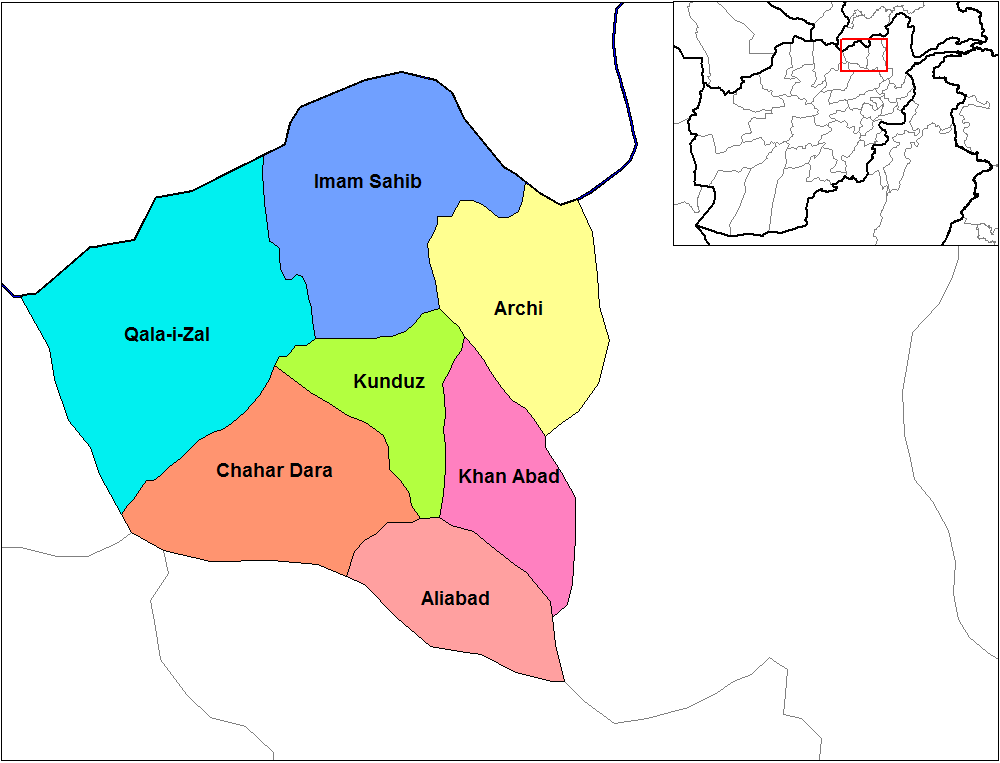
Map of the districts of Kunduz as of January 2004, prior to the redrawing of provincial and district boundaries later that year

Districts of Kunduz Province
District	Capital	Population	Area	Pop. density	Demographics
Ali Abad		53,276	565	94	47% Pashtuns, 33% Tajiks, 12% Hazara, 8% Uzbeks
Archi		95,903	676	142	40% Pashtuns, 35% Uzbeks, 15% Tajiks, 10% Turkmen
Chardara		83,037	1,158	72	33% Uzbeks, 25% Tajiks, 22% Pashtuns, 17% Turkmen, 3% Hazara
Imam Sahib	Sherkhan Bandar	264,555	1,778	149	45% Uzbeks, 25% Pashtuns, 25% Tajiks, <1% Hazara Includes the Kalbaad District.
Khan Abad		184,062	1,092	169	40% Pashtuns, 25% Tajiks, 20% Hazara, 10% Uzbeks, 5% Pashai Includes the Aqtash District.
Kunduz	Kunduz	376,232	612	615	33% Pashtuns, 27% Uzbeks, 22% Tajiks, 11% Turkmen, 6% Hazara, 1% Pashai Includes the Gul Tepah District.
Qalay-I-Zal		79,612	1,984	40	90% Turkmen, 10% Pashtuns
Kunduz		1,136,677	8,081	141	33.2% Pashtuns, 26.8% Uzbeks, 21.8% Tajiks, 9.9% Turkmens, 6.1% Hazaras, 1.1% Pashayi. (Note: "Predominantely" or "dominated" is interpreted as 99%, "majority" as 70%, "mixed" as 1/(number of ethnicities), "minority" as 30% and "few" or "some" as 1%.)

== Economy ==
=== Agriculture ===
Agriculture and livestock husbandry are the primary occupations of the provinces residents. Fruit and vegetable are the most commonly farms items but there is also some cotton and sesame production. Farmers faced water shortages.

Men and women in Kunduz were employed in clothing production, metal working, carpentry and hide business.

The port of Sherkhan Bandar provides an international outlet for Kunduz's goods and has allowed for importing commercial goods from Asia, Middle East, and the Persian Gulf.

Cotton production is the province's most important industry. Agriculture is a significant source of income for 66 percent of households in the province, including 34 percent of urban households. However, commerce and services provide income to 28% of households, and non-farm work provides income to 15% of households. To some extent, Kunduz produces industrial crops. Sesame is another important product, in addition to cotton. The province's small-business sector is essentially non-existent, and karakul skin is the main product. Handicrafts aren't made in significant quantities, but rugs and jewelry are made to some extent. In the province, 85 percent of households have access to irrigated land, while 12 percent have access to irrigated land. Wheat, rice, watermelons, melons, and maize are among the province's most important field crops. Sheep, cattle, poultry, donkeys, and goats are the most frequent livestock.

=== Energy ===
Only 25% of families have access to safe drinking water, and only 18% of houses have access to electricity, with the bulk relying on public power. Safe toilets are found in only 2% of urban households, while they are almost non-existent in rural regions.

=== Transportation ===
The province's transportation infrastructure is fairly well developed, with 68 percent of roads capable of carrying car traffic in all seasons. However, there are no roads in 4% of the province.

The province is served by Kunduz Airport which had regularly scheduled direct flights to Kabul as of May 2014. The Tajikistan–Afghanistan bridge at Panji Poyon connects the province to Tajikistan.

=== Communication ===
In terms of telecommunications, the Roshan (telco), Afghan Wireless, and MTN Digital phone networks are all operational in the province.

== Demographics ==
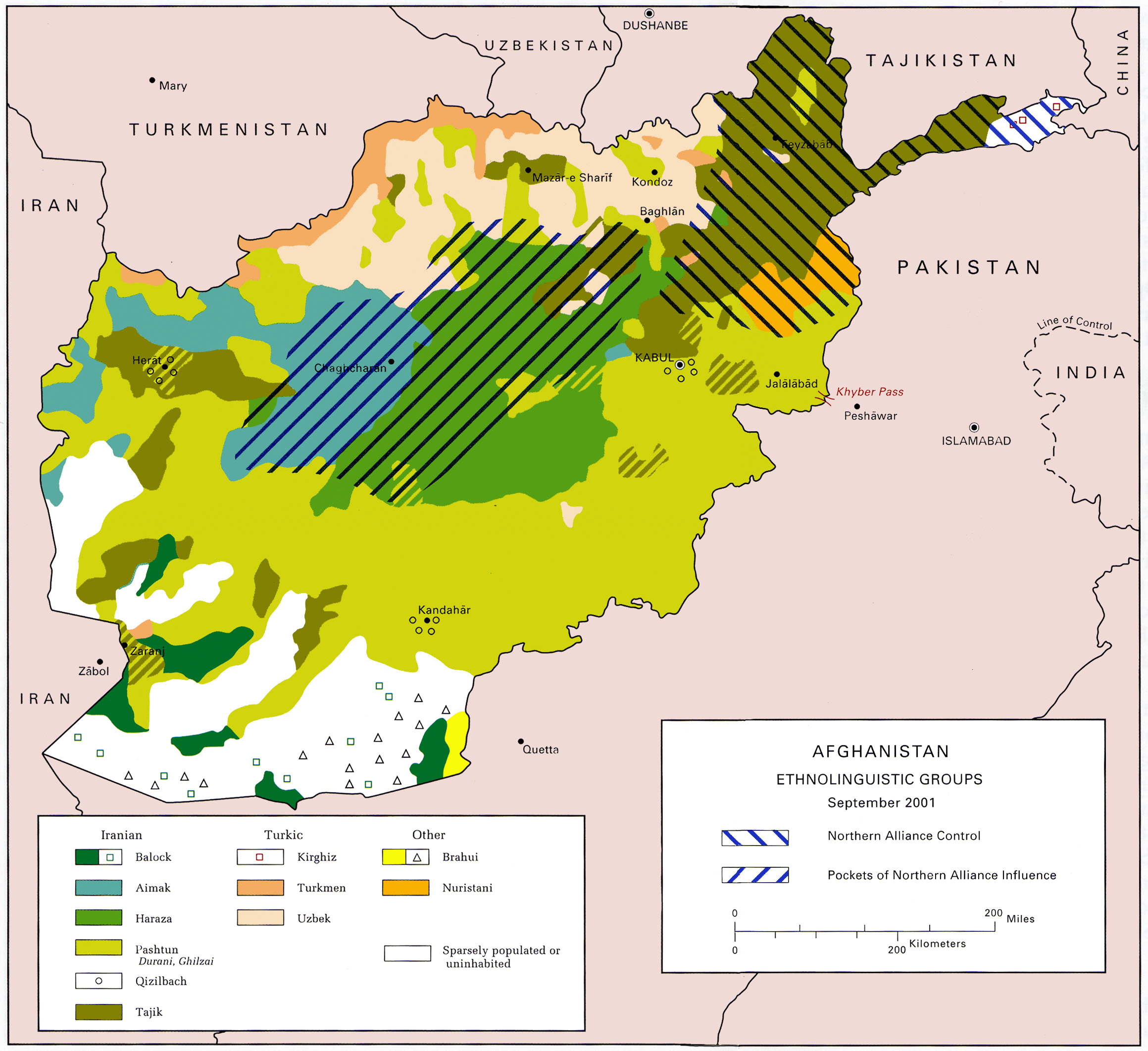
Ethnolinguistic groups of Afghanistan

=== Population ===
Although a reliable census has not been carried out, as of 2020 the population of Kunduz province is estimated to be around 1,136,677 people. The province is mostly rural and very ethnically diverse of Afghanistan's provinces.

An estimated 49.3% of the population is female, with the other 50.7% being male.

=== Ethnicity, languages and religion ===
According to the Naval Postgraduate School, the ethnic groups of the province are as follows: Pashtuns 33%, Uzbeks 27%, Tajiks 22%, Turkmens 11%, Hazaras 6%, and Pashais 1%.

About 94% of the population practice Sunni Islam and 6% are followers of Shia Islam. The major languages spoken in the area are Pashto, Dari Persian, and Uzbeki.

Estimated ethnolinguistic and -religious composition
Ethnicity	Pashtun	Farsiwan		Uzbek	Turkmen	Hazara	Arab	Pashayi	Others	Sources
Period	Pashtun	Tajik	Aimaq	Uzbek	Turkmen	Hazara	Arab	Pashayi	Others	Sources

2004–2021 (Islamic Republic)	33 – 40%	20 – 22%		15 – 27%	8 – 17%	4 – 10%	3 – 5%	1%	∅
2020 EU	1st	–	–	–	–	–	–	–	–
2019 AA	37%	15%	7%	18%	10%	10%	3%	–	–
2018 UN	34% (Note: incl. Omarkhel, Ibrahimkhel, and Ahmadzai, and excl. Kochi.)	20%		18% (Note: incl. Qarluq.)	17%	10% (Note: incl. Sadat, Sheikh Ali, and Ismaili.)	∅	–	∅ (Note: incl. Sujani, Toghli, and Baloch.)
2015 CP	major	major	–	minor	8%	minor	–	–	–
2015 NPS	33%	22%	–	27%	11%	6%	–	1%	–
2012 AAN	34%	20%	–	27%	9.4%	3.5%	4.6%	∅	∅ (Note: incl. Baloch and Nuristani.)
2011 PRT	major	major		minor	8%	minor	∅	–	∅
2011 UCD	major	major		minor	minor	minor	∅	–	∅
2011 USA	∅	∅	–	∅	∅	∅	–	–	–
2010 SWP	40%	–	–	15 – 25%	–	–	–	–	–

Legend:
- ∅: Ethnicity mentioned in source but not quantified
- –: Ethnicity not mentioned specifically
- Source abbreviations: Empirical sources: AA – Federal Foreign Office of Germany, Government sources: EU – European Union Agency for Asylum, PRT – Provincial Reconstruction Team of the United States government, UN – United Nations Assistance Mission in Afghanistan, Editorial sources: AAN – Afghanistan Analysts Network, NPS – Naval Postgraduate School, SWP – German Institute for International and Security Affairs, UCD – University of California, Davis, (Note: Produced at UCD as part of the Regional Rural Economic Regeneration Strategies subproject of the eAfghan Ag project, supported by USAID.) USA – United States Army

=== Education ===
The overall literacy rate (6+ years of age) fell from 33% in 2005 to 20% in 2011. The overall net enrolment rate (6–13 years of age) fell from 62% in 2005 to 50% in 2011.

=== Health ===
The percentage of households with clean drinking water fell from 25% in 2005 to 16% in 2011. The percentage of births attended to by a skilled birth attendant increased from 6% in 2005 to 22% in 2011.
