= Andrew Quilty =

Australian photojournalist

Andrew Quilty is an Australian photojournalist based in Afghanistan.

== Career ==
After graduating from a TAFE photography course in 2004, Quilty undertook an informal internship at Fairfax Media which led to full-time employment. Quilty left Fairfax in 2010 and became a freelance photographer in Sydney, before he relocated to New York.

In 2013, Quilty visited Afghanistan where he says he discovered his "bonafide purpose and fulfilment" in his work, deciding to be permanently based in Kabul.

Throughout his career, Quilty's photography has been recognised with a number of awards.

Most notably, Quilty was awarded the Gold Walkley in 2016. The award was presented to Quilty in recognition for "The Man on the Operating Table", a photograph of hospital patient Baynazar Mohammed Nazar lying dead on an operating table in the Kunduz Trauma Centre, run by Médecins Sans Frontières, after the 2015 American airstrike which killed 42 people and injured over 30 others.

Quilty was involved in uncovering the killing of Dad Mohammad by Australian soldiers, and has been identified as a prosecution witness in the trial of the soldier responsible.

His first book, August in Kabul: America's last days in Afghanistan, was published in 2022.

== Personal life ==
Quilty is the cousin of painter Ben Quilty.

== Bibliography ==
- Quilty, Andrew (September 2021). "When the raids came : the war's toll on one Afghan family". Harper's Magazine. 343 (2056): 41–51.
- — (2022). August in Kabul : America's last days in Afghanistan. Carlton, Vic.: Melbourne University Press.
