= Extraction (military) =

Military operation to remove personnel

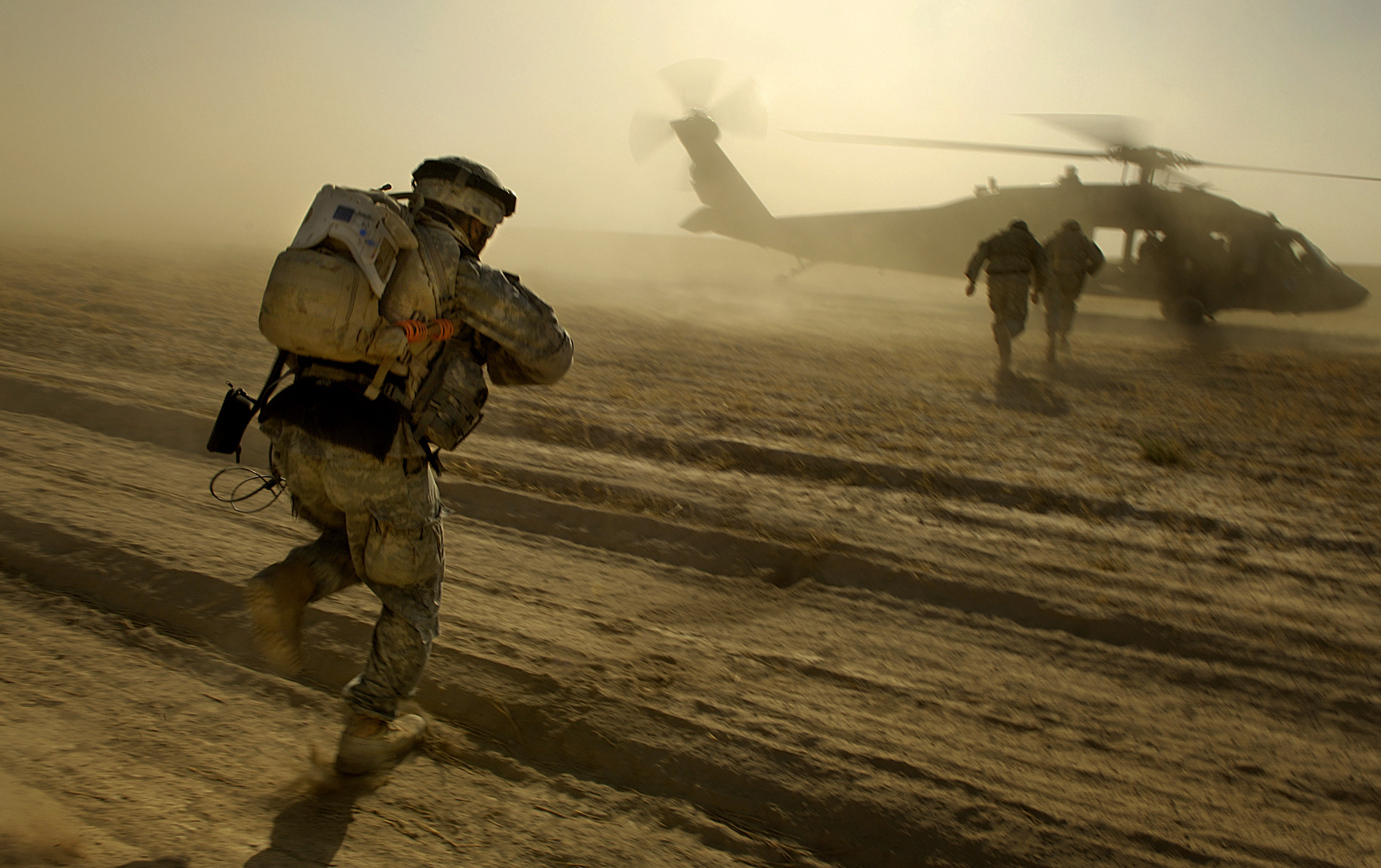
A UH-60 Black Hawk helicopter performing an extraction of United States Army troops in Iraq

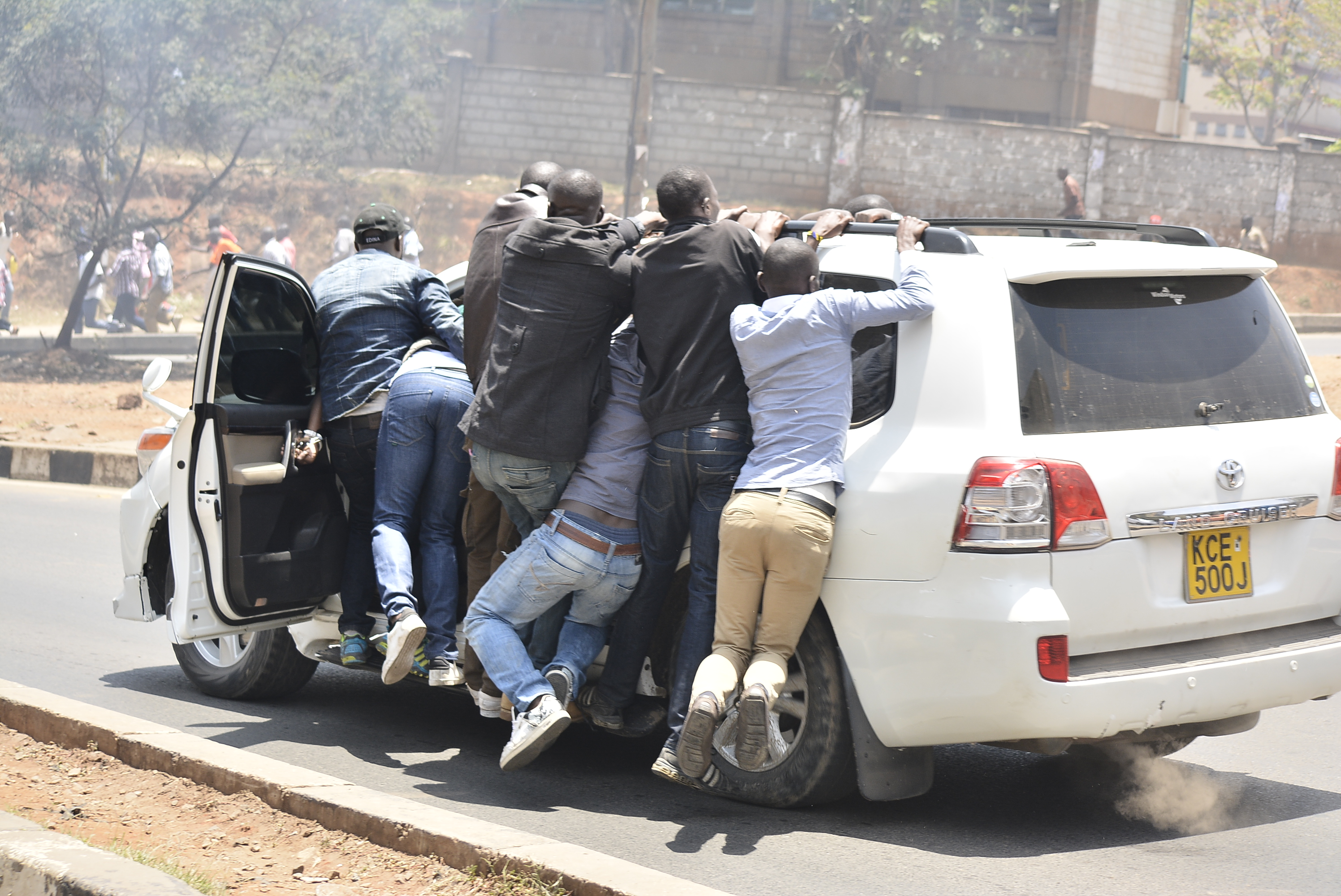
Exfiltration of a member of the parliament during riots in Nairobi (2017).

In military tactics, extraction is the process of removing personnel or units from an area; when conducted with stealth in an area controlled by the enemy it is referred to as exfiltration.

An example of a hostile extraction was Battle of Boz Qandahari, in which U.S. Army Special Forces used donkeys to reach their extraction point while under enemy fire. Another example of an extraction was the joint U.S. Central Intelligence Agency-Canadian government operation to smuggle six fugitive American diplomatic personnel out of revolutionary Iran in 1980 in an operation later known as the Canadian Caper.

== See also ==
- List of established military terms
- Infiltration tactics
- Landing zone
