= Minniti =

Minniti is a surname. Notable people with the surname include:

- Marco Minniti (born 1956), Italian politician
- Mario Minniti (1577–1640), Italian painter
- Tito Minniti (1909–1935), Italian pilot
