= Bir Mahali =

Bir Mahali بئر محلي
- Village
- Interactive map of Bir Mahali
- Country: Syria
- Governorate: Aleppo Governorate
- District: Ayn al-Arab
- Subdistrict: Sarrin

Population
  - Total: 430
- Time zone: UTC+2 (EET)
  - Summer (DST): UTC+3 (EEST)
- P-Code: C2094

Bir Mahali (or Birmahle; Arabic: بئر محلي) is a village in the eastern part of Aleppo Governorate in northern Syria, south of the Syrian Kurdish enclave of Ayn al-Arab and near the town of Sarrin.

The fishing and farming village on the banks of Euphrates is predominantly Arab-populated with some 430 inhabitants.

== United States-led airstrike in 2015 ==
Between 30 April and 1 May 2015, coalition airstrikes led by the United States, said to target ISIL, killed at least 64 civilians: 31 minors, 20 women, and 13 men in the village then populated by some 4000 inhabitants.

The Syrian Observatory for Human Rights described the event as a "massacre" and said the attack on the village constitutes the highest civilian losses from an attack by US and allied Arab forces since the launch of their air campaign against ISIL on September 23, 2014.

A United States Central Command spokesperson commented on 2 May 2015, "We currently have no information to corroborate allegations that coalition airstrikes resulted in civilian casualties. Regardless, we take all allegations seriously and will look into them further."

== See also ==
- Kunduz hospital airstrike
- Airstrikes on hospitals in Yemen
