= Battle of Boz Qandahari =

Battle of the War in Afghanistan, 3 November 2016

Coordinates: 36.7333°N 68.8667°E

Battle of Boz Qandahari (2016)
- Part of the War in Afghanistan (2001–2021)
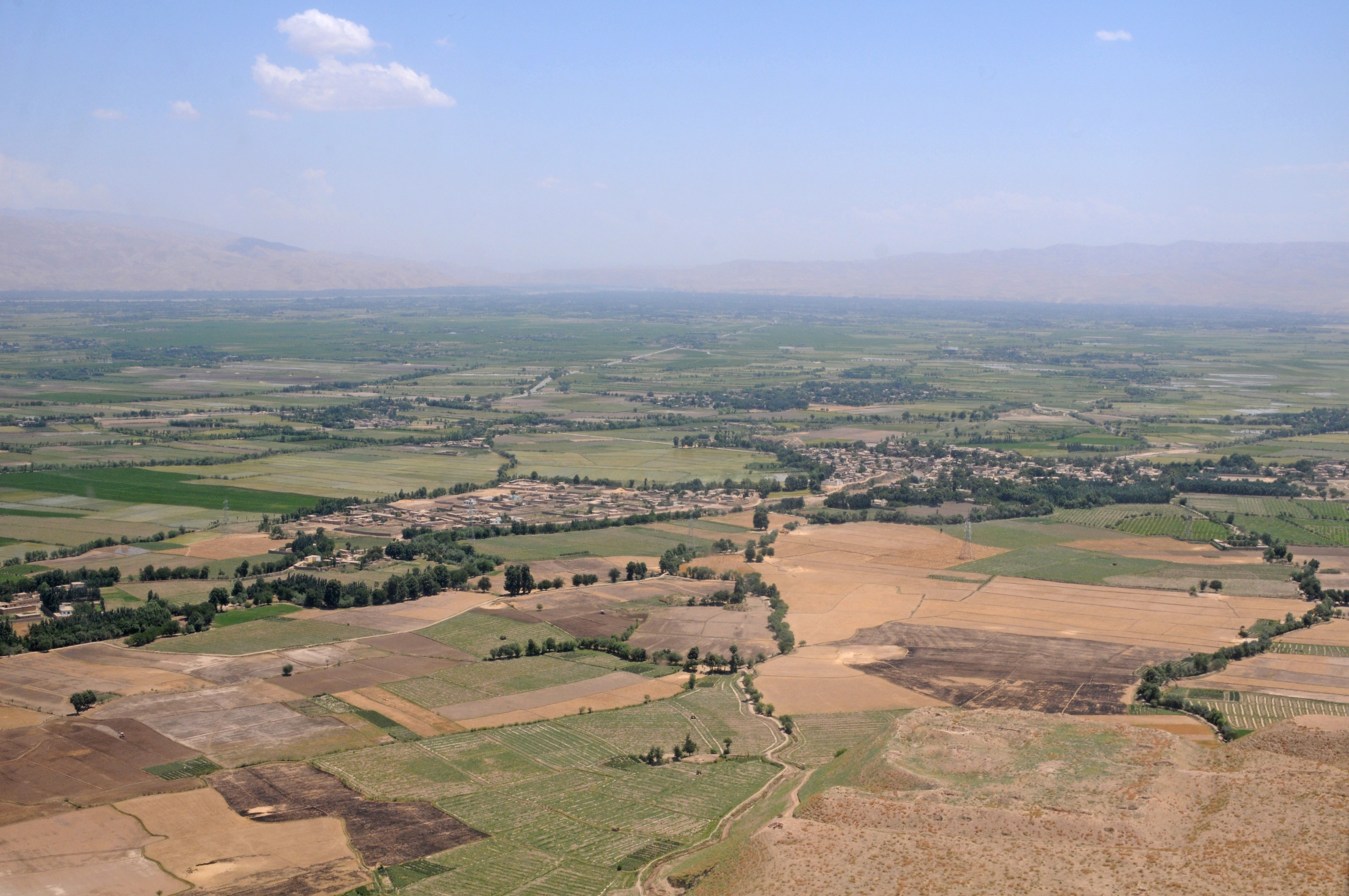
- Typical landscape on the outskirts of Kunduz
Date	3 November 2016; 9 years ago
Location	Kunduz, Kunduz Province, Afghanistan
Result	Afghan & U.S. victory

Belligerents
Islamic Republic of Afghanistan; United States	(Afghanistan) Taliban

Commanders and leaders
(Islamic Republic of Afghanistan) Gen. Murad Ali Murad (United States) Maj. Andrew Byers †	(Afghanistan) Mullah Zia al-Rahman Mutaqi † (Afghanistan) Mullah Zamir †

Units involved
(Afghanistan) ANA Commando Corps (United States) 10th Special Forces Group: ODA 0224; (United States) US Air Force	

Strength
(Islamic Republic of Afghanistan) 46 commandos (United States) 13 Special Operations Forces (10 Special Forces, 2 Support enablers, 1 JTAC; Reinforcements; 10 U.S. Special Forces; 1 AC-130 gunship AH-64 Apache attack helicopters	Several dozen insurgents

Casualties and losses
(Islamic Republic of Afghanistan) 3 killed, 11 wounded (United States) 2 killed, 4 wounded	27 insurgents killed including 3 commanders (per U.S.), 10 injured
- 33 civilians killed, 27 injured Total dead: 65+

The Battle of Boz Qandahari occurred on 3 November 2016, in the village of Boz Qandahari, on the western outskirts of the Afghan city of Kunduz, between Afghan National Army Commandos alongside United States Army Special Forces against Taliban insurgents.

== Background ==
The northern province of Kunduz had in recent times experienced several episodes of heavy fighting, with Taliban insurgents briefly taking control of Kunduz city in the fall of 2015 before retreating. During that battle, a U.S. airstrike hit the Kunduz Trauma Centre, a hospital run by Médecins Sans Frontières, leaving at least 42 people dead and 30 others injured.

The area remained volatile during 2016, with numerous kidnappings and roadside bombings occurring on the outskirts of Kunduz. One month before the Boz Qandahari raid, militants attempted to take control of the city for the second time, forcing a two-day battle in which hundreds were killed.

== Battle ==
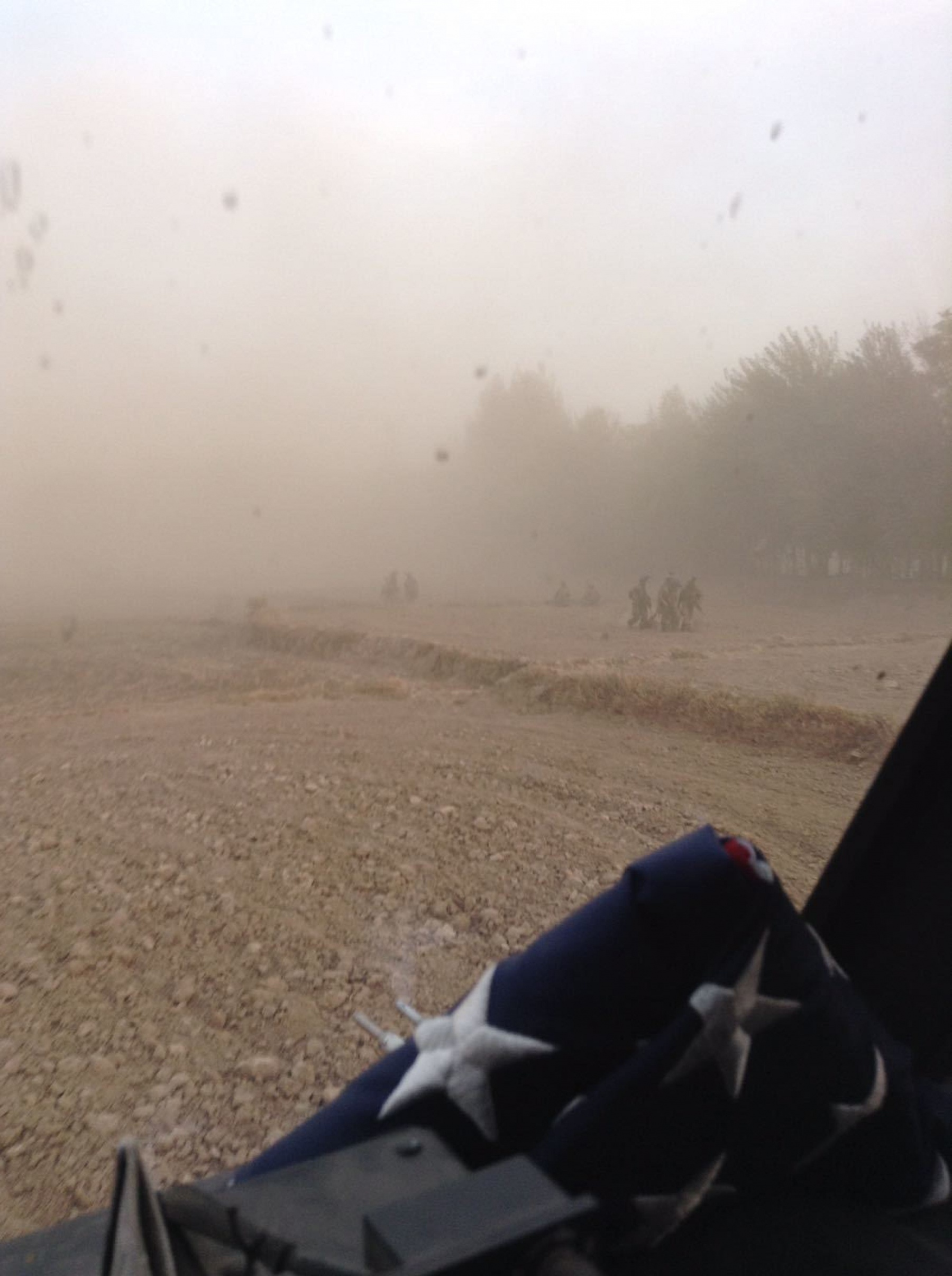
Green Berets of 10th Special Forces Group (Airborne), and their Afghan partner force, transport wounded soldiers through a hot landing zone to a waiting medical evacuation helicopter while a determined enemy force continues to attack during the Battle of Boz Qandahari, Afghanistan on November 3, 2016.

The fighting broke out during a training mission conducted between a joint Afghan and United States patrol. The objective was to disrupt Taliban activities in Kunduz District, search for high-ranking members planning attacks, and clear out their positions in the immediate area. Afghan forces later reported the target of the mission was Mullah Zia al-Rahman Mutaqi, a senior local Taliban commander who was reported to be having a meeting in Boz Qandahari together with his second-in-command Mullah Zamir.

According to Ahmad Jawed Salim, an official spokesman for the Afghan National Army in Kunduz Province, the night raid included 14 United States Army Special Forces who were acting on an intelligence tip that a fresh assault on Kunduz was being planned, with Boz Qandahari as its staging point. After the insurgents cornered the combined U.S.-Afghan patrol in a dead end street, the trapped soldiers were forced to call in airstrikes in order to escape. A spokesman for the United States military in Afghanistan confirmed that after receiving heavy fire 'from multiple directions' in the village of Boz Qandahari, west of Kunduz, service members responded in order to defend themselves, and U.S. Lockheed C-130 Hercules aircraft were called in to conduct airstrikes as part of the operation, in addition to support from AH-64 Apache helicopters. According to a local Afghan source, the insurgents were successful in initially surrounding the patrol, forcing them to call for air support.

Two U.S. soldiers were killed during the battle, while two others were injured. Three members of the Afghan Special Forces were also killed, and 5 others were injured. Provincial officials reported at least 26 insurgents were killed (including Mutaqi and Zamir) and 10 others were injured, while coalition air strikes caused the deaths of 32 civilians and wounded 46 more. Many of those killed were women and children, and the toll included four members of Mr. Zamir's family and seven members of Mr. Mutaqi's family.

== Aftermath ==
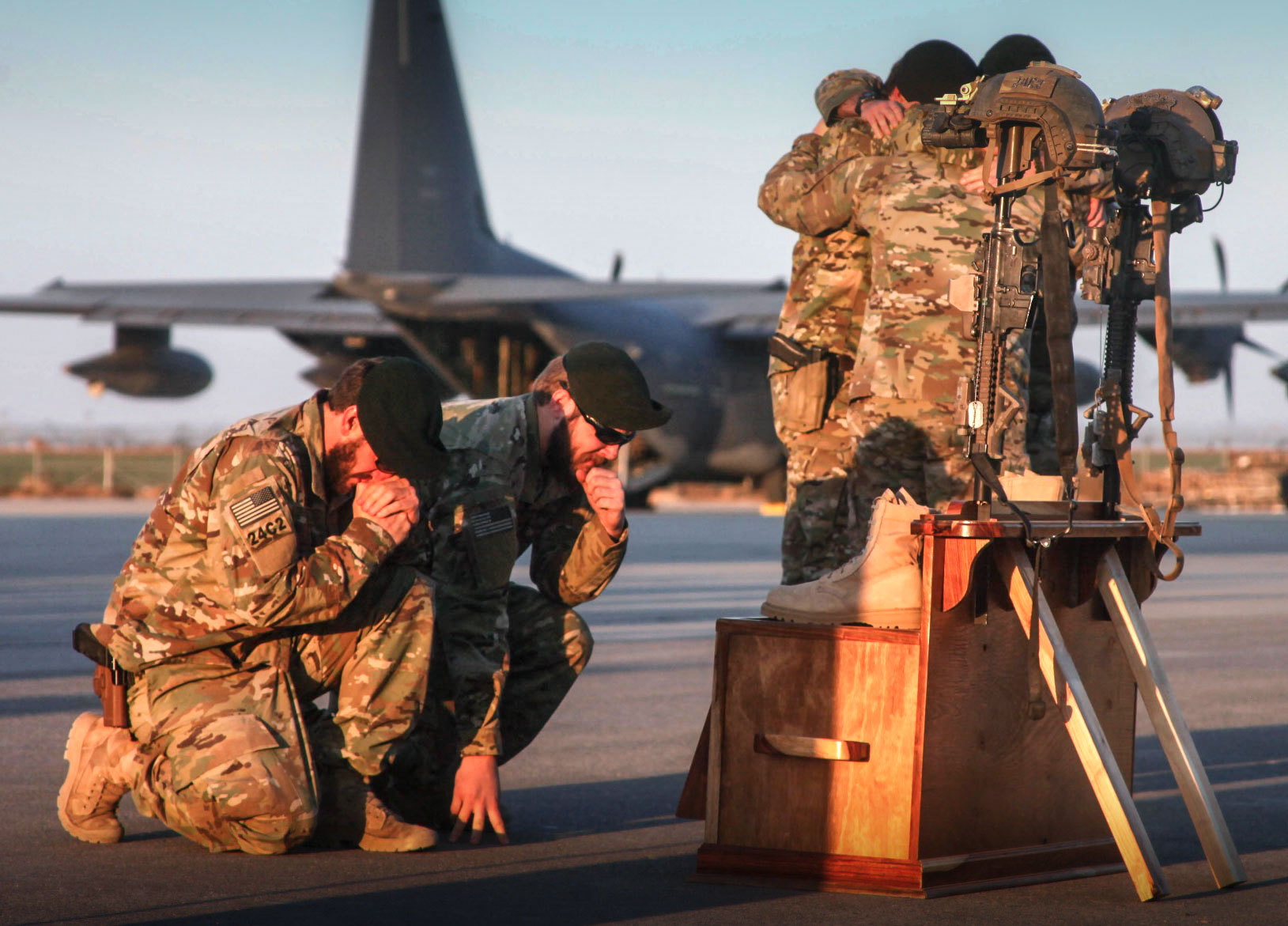
Soldiers of the 10th Special Forces Group (Airborne) memorialize two of their fallen brothers during a memorial held at Kunduz Airfield in Afghanistan on November 7, 2016. Major Andrew Byers, the commander, and Sergeant First Class Ryan Gloyer, an intelligence sergeant, were killed in action during the Battle of Boz Qandahari, Afghanistan, on November 2–3, 2016.

In the immediate aftermath of the battle it was not known exactly who conducted the airstrikes, with Kunduz Province Governor Asadullah Omarkhail contradicting local officials by denying U.S. forces took part in the raid, and arguing that Afghan Air Force helicopter units were called in instead. This was later repeated by the spokesman for the Afghan Ministry of Defense Gen. Dawlat Waziri.

On November 5, the commander of the Resolute Support Mission Gen. John W. Nicholson Jr. issued a statement in which he confirmed that U.S. forces were indeed responsible for the civilian casualties, and promised a joint US-Afghan investigation into the events. "I deeply regret the loss of innocent lives, regardless of the circumstances," the announcement read, "The loss of innocent life is a tragedy and our thoughts are with the families." The office of President Ashraf Ghani also issued a statement, in which they blamed the Taliban for any civilian casualties. "The enemies of Afghanistan used civilians and their houses as a shield in fighting with Afghan forces in Boz Qandahari area of Kunduz city, and as a result a number of civilians were killed and wounded, including women and children," the statement read.

A senior leader in Boz Qandahari, however, denied there were Taliban members in the village, and instead accused government forces of harassing the residents because of their Pashtun origin. Most Kunduz natives are of Tajik or Uzbek ethnic origin. The local, named Jamaluddin, said at least four houses were destroyed in a series of raids that lasted for up to five hours, and began after a joint Afghan-U.S. force arrived via helicopter. Foreign reporters questioned the authenticity of some of these statements, pointing out that the narrow alley where the U.S. and Afghan soldiers were killed is only accessible from the houses that were bombed.

The United Nations Assistance Mission in Afghanistan (UNAMA) announced on November 6 that it will investigate the attack, in which at least 32 civilians were now known to have died. The head of UNAMA, Tadamichi Yamamoto, described the loss of civilian life as "unacceptable", and urged international military forces to take all measures to minimize it.

A NATO investigation determined that 33 civilians were killed in the battle, 27 civilians were wounded, and 26 Taliban fighters were killed. The investigation cleared U.S. forces of wrongdoing.

Military Times reported on 1 December 2017 that the crewmembers of an AC-130U Gunship ("Spooky 43") was awarded the Mackay Trophy for their actions during the battle; of the 14 crewmembers, 5 members of the crew were awarded the Distinguished Flying Cross and 4 others were awarded the Air Medal with valour.

== See also ==
- 2016 in Afghanistan
- German consulate in Mazar-i-Sharif attack, a suicide truck bombing that took place one week later
