= Dolo hospital airstrike =

1935 Italian bombing in Dolo, Ethiopia

- Part of the Second Italo-Ethiopian War
- Location: 4°10′N 42°04′E; Dolo, Ethiopia
- Date: 30 December 1935
- Target: Field hospital
- Attack type: Airstrike
- Deaths: 22–30
- Perpetrator: Royal Italian Air Force

On 30 December 1935, a Swedish Red Cross field hospital was destroyed in an airstrike by the Regia Aeronautica (Royal Italian Air Force) in Dolo, Ethiopia, killing between 22 and 30 people, mostly Ethiopians. The attack was reportedly part of an Italian reprisal for the earlier execution of an Italian prisoner of war by Ethiopian troops or civilians.

== Background ==
Following the outbreak of the Second Italo-Ethiopian War in 1935, the Swedish Red Cross mobilized a field hospital to send to Ethiopia under the supervision of physician Fride Hylander. Hylander and his deputy, Gunnar Agge, both had extensive experience working in Ethiopia, the latter having previously served as a staff physician seconded to the Imperial Ethiopian Army. The Red Cross' plans for the hospital was that it would be stationed in Harrar, away from the fighting, however, the Ethiopian government directed it be split into two and both elements moved to the front lines, an order to which the Swedish officials acquiesced. By 19 December, the larger of the two hospitals was in place and fully operational near Dolo.

On 26 December, Italian pilot Tito Minniti was brought down near Dolo while flying a mission, whereupon he was captured, castrated, and beheaded, the execution committed either by Ethiopian troops (according to the Italians) or by local civilians (according to the Ethiopians).

== Bombing ==
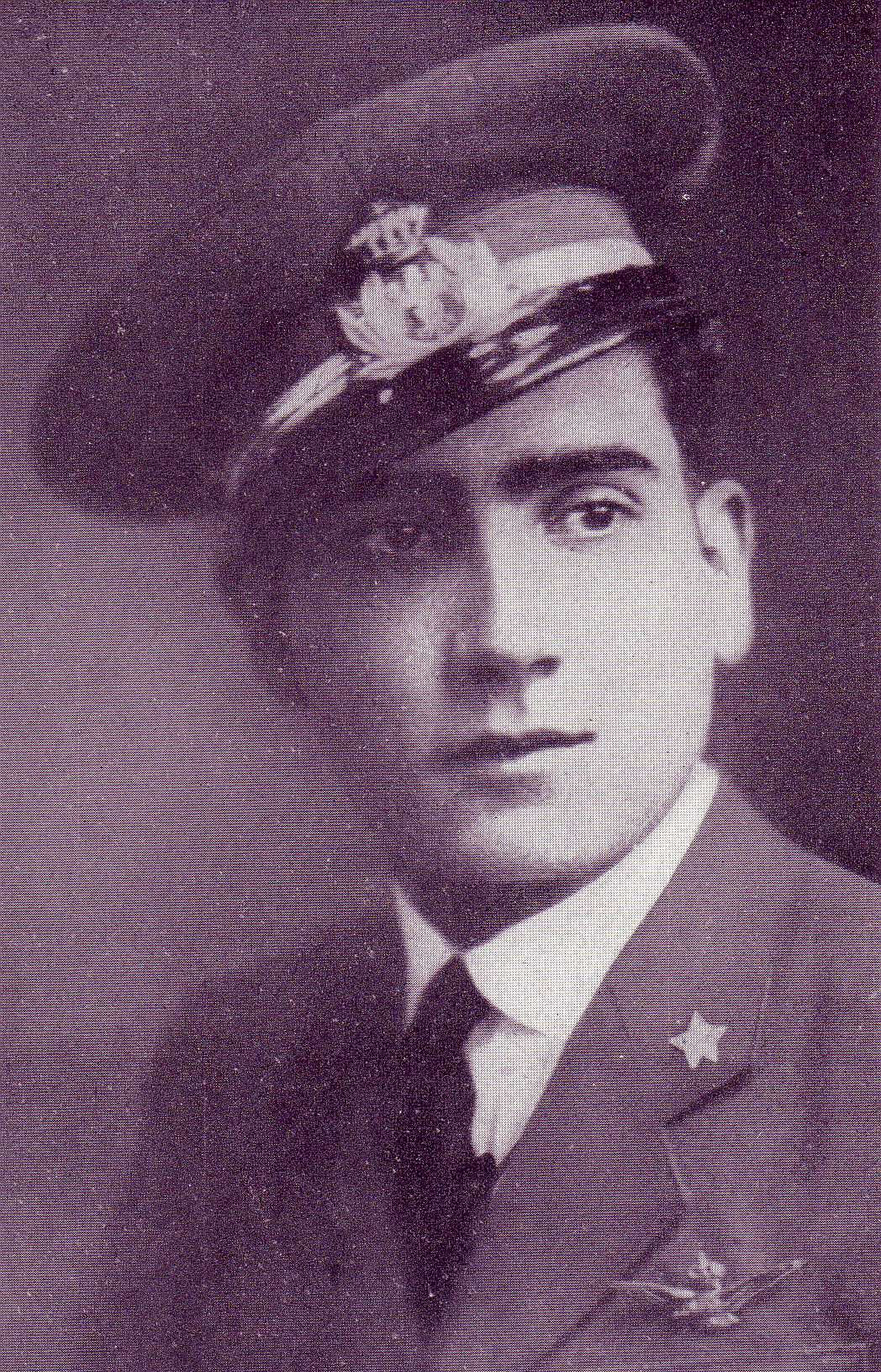
The attack followed the execution of Tito Minniti (pictured).

On 30 December 1935, four days following the death of Minniti, the Italian Air Force dropped approximately 100 bombs on the Swedish hospital at Dolo, destroying all medical equipment, killing two Swedish staff members as well as numerous Ethiopians, and injuring Hylander. The number of dead Ethiopians varied between sources and ranged from 18 to 28. The initial official announcement by the Red Cross claimed a casualty figure of nine Swedes and twenty three Ethiopians. Following the airstrike, Italian aircraft made a second pass over the site, dropping leaflets lettered in Amharic, signed by the Marquis of Neghelli, which read:

You have transgressed the laws of kingdoms and nations by killing a captive airman by beheading him. According to the law, prisoners must be treated with respect. You will consequently receive the punishment which you deserve.

According to later claims by Swedish officials, at the time of the attack, the Swedish hospital was positioned at a distance of 5 kilometers (3.1 mi) from an Ethiopian headquarters and was guarded by a five-man Ethiopian Army contingent. However, Swedish officials claimed, the escort troops did not enter the grounds of the hospital except for "some visits by its head". A Red Cross representative, the Swiss physician Marcel Junod, also asserted that there was "no doubt that the bombing was deliberate."

== Aftermath ==
Following the bombing, surviving Swedish Red Cross staff fled to Addis Ababa and were subsequently withdrawn from the country. The remains of the deceased Swedish staff were repatriated to Sweden in an aircraft piloted by the Count von Rosen. About a week after the attack, a similar airstrike was made against a Canadian Red Cross field hospital. Other hospitals were also targeted in the war. In the 90th session of the League of Nations the Swedish and Ethiopian delegates protested against the Italian air raids targeting Red Cross hospitals and asked for their immunity. The Red Cross also recommended that all its hospital personnel withdraw from Ethiopia unless Italy promised to not strike them.

Several days following the attack, Italy expressed its official regret to Sweden for the bombing of the Swedish Red Cross hospital but warned against narrating tendentious versions of the incident. The bombing was asserted to be a reprisal against the "atrocity committed by the Ethiopians".

Due to the fact that – at the time of the attack – Sweden did not have diplomatic relations with Ethiopia, the United Kingdom undertook an investigation into the airstrike on its behalf. On 15 January 1936, the Swedish government filed a formal protest with the Kingdom of Italy.

=== Legacy ===
A memorial in Glommersträsk, Sweden commemorates Gunnar Lundström, one of Sweden's two fatalities in the attack. The airport in Reggio Calabria, meanwhile, is officially named Reggio Calabria Tito Minniti Airport in honor of the Italian aviator.

== See also ==
- Destruction of the healthcare system
- Attack on the United States embassy in Addis Ababa
- Russian–Syrian hospital bombing campaign
- Attacks on health facilities during the Israel–Hamas war
- Kunduz hospital airstrike
