= Yemen Data Project =

Web-based effort to chronicle the Saudi-led intervention in the Yemeni civil war

- Website: yemendataproject.org
- Launched: c. 2016

The Yemen Data Project (YDP) is a nonprofit organization focused on data collection regarding the Yemeni civil war. It was formed in 2016 and has monitored airstrikes by the Saudi-led coalition during the war and civilian impact. Its figures have been referenced by media reports, governmental and non-governmental entities. It has also recorded data on the Red Sea crisis.

== Overview ==
Formed by a group of experts with backgrounds in national security, human rights, humanitarian work and academica, the Yemen Data Project describes itself as an "independent data collection project aimed at collecting and disseminating data on the conduct of the war in Yemen." It was founded in 2016, a year into the Saudi-led intervention in the Yemeni civil war, but its members were collecting data from the day the intervention started. Formed in the absence of official figures on the war, the project's goal is for "increasing accountability and promoting transparency." It had no funding sources in its early years and was operating "off a shoestring".

Based on data shared by the Yemen Data Project, The Guardian published an article in 2016 which revealed that a third of the Saudi-led coalitions' airstrikes by then had struck civilian targets. A public representative for the group said that: “Overnight, the Yemen Data Project was born... Without that initial reporting from The Guardian, the YDP would never have existed."

From there, information from the Yemen Data Project was utilized internationally in media reports and academic research, and by lawmakers. The project formed a research partnership with Armed Conflict Location and Event Data (ACLED) in which it provides sources on events in Yemen to ACLED researchers before being coded into the latters datasets on violence in the country. The Yemen Data Project was cited in a High Court of Justice case which resulted in the United Kingdom suspending arms sales to Saudi Arabia in 2019, and in a study by The Lancet which determined a correlation between coalition airstrikes and Yemen's cholera outbreak.

After the United Nations Human Rights Council closed its investigation into Saudi-led coalition war crimes in 2021, the Yemen Data Project found an upsurge in coalition airstrikes and civilian harm in the absence of monitoring. By the 2022 UN-brokered ceasefire, the project recorded over 25,000 airstrikes in total conducted by the Saudi-led coalition during the war. It has also documented figures related to the Red Sea crisis, jointly launching a database with ACLED documenting its various actors in 2024.

== Methods ==
The Yemen Data Project collects data on the aerial campaign of the war rather than ground fighting. Yemenis based in the country research and collect open source data, valued for their local knowledge, ability to deduce biases, and access to various open sources. All members of the organization are anonymous to maintain their security—freelance journalist Iona Craig is their sole public representative, but neither does she know the identities of the data collectors. It is a nonprofit organization which is "independently funded to avoid any partisan affiliation"—its website states that funding is derived from the Open Society Foundations, the Joseph Rowntree Charitable Trust, and volunteer donors.

The project emphasizes the non-partiality of its research, adhering to the Casualty Recorders Network and the "Standards for Casualty Recording". Its members have received data collection methodology and data analysis training from ACLED. The project utilizes open sources, including media reports, information on social media and from non-governmental organisations, and evidence collected from the ground. In the case that independent reports are not available on a certain topic or incident, data from opposing combatants is collected and cross-referenced with other sources.

== See also ==
- Iraq Body Count project—a similar effort focused on the Iraq War
