= International Humanitarian Fact-Finding Commission =

International humanitarian law body

The International Humanitarian Fact-Finding Commission (IHFFC) is an international body that is available to perform investigations of possible breaches of international humanitarian law. The Commission may investigate matters to determine what has happened, but does not pass judgment on issues it raises.

== History ==
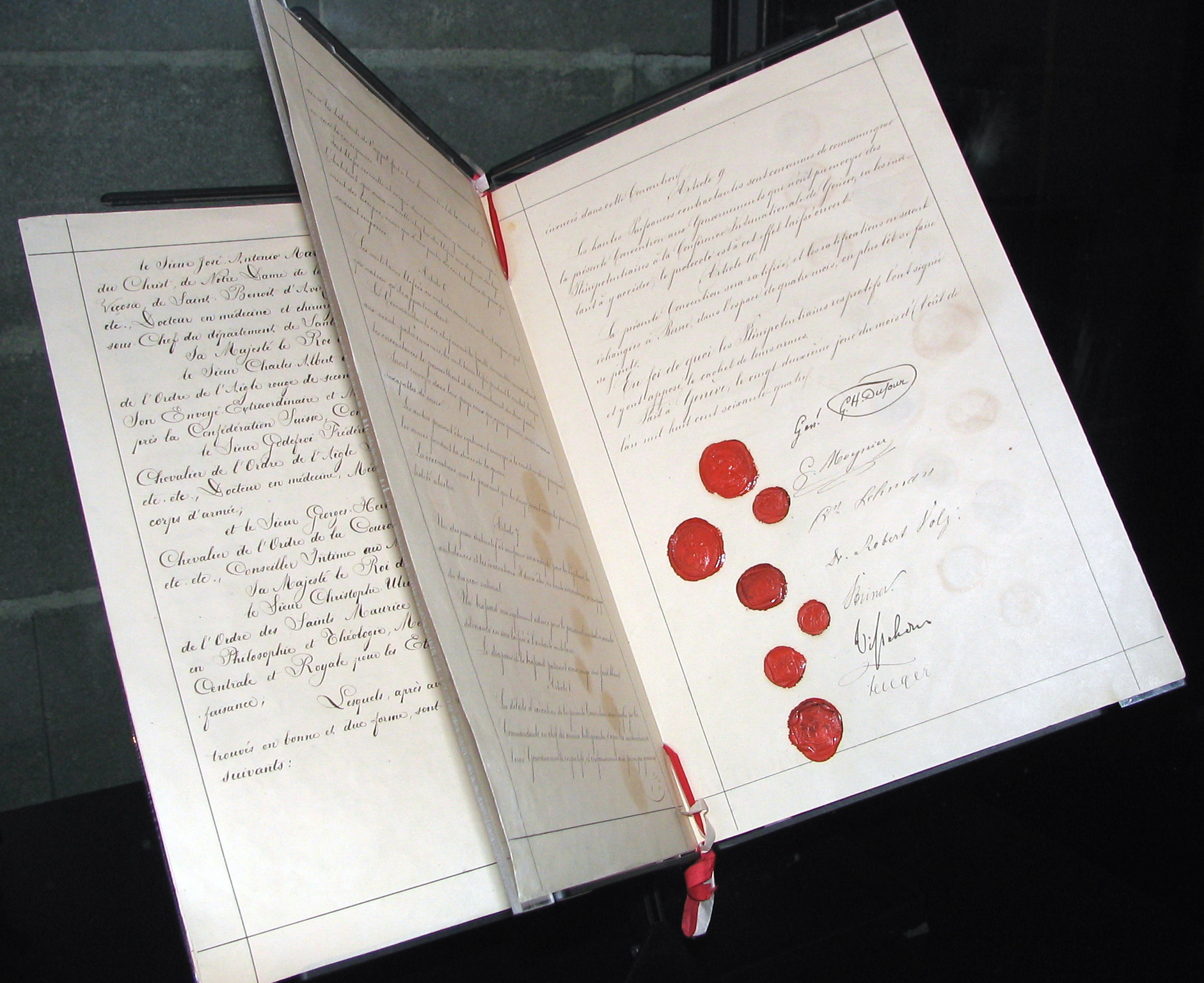
Geneva Conventions

IHFFC was established in 1991 and has its basis in the First Optional Protocol to the Geneva Conventions, agreed in 1977.

== Operation ==
The Swiss Ministry of Foreign Affairs carries out the secretariat functions. IHFFC is headquartered in Bern. 76 states have joined the body.

The organization has the status of a permanent observer in the UN General Assembly.

== Activations ==
On 7 October 2015, Médecins Sans Frontières called for activating the commission, to investigate the deadly U.S. bombing of MSF's hospital in Kunduz, Afghanistan. MSF says it does not trust internal military inquiries into the bombing that killed 42 people, which it considers a war crime. USA and Afghanistan are not among the 76 signatories of the IHFFC.

In 2016, Médecins Sans Frontières again called for the Commission activation, after the bombing of an MSF hospital in Yemen.

The commission received its first mission in 2017, from the OSCE, to investigate the death of an OSCE ambulance driver in Ukraine. It concluded that it was caused by an anti-tank mine and “[g]iven the fact that - as was commonly known - the road was frequently used by civilian traffic, any recent laying of anti-vehicle mines constitutes a violation of IHL because of the predictable indiscriminate effect”.

Russia withdrew from the commission's remit in 2019.

== Members of the Commission ==
The Commission consists of fifteen experts. On 20 February 2017 they were:

Name	Position	Country	Member since
Prof. Thilo MARAUHN	President	Germany	2012
Dr. Elzbieta MIKOS-SKUZA	First Vice-president	Poland	2001
Dr. Mohamed Mahmoud AL KAMALI	Vice-president	United Arab Emirates	2012
Ambassador Alfredo LABBÉ	Vice-president	Chile	2017
Dr Robin McNEILL LOVE	Vice-president	United Kingdom	2017
Mr Abdulla Rashid S.A. AL-NAIMI	Member	Qatar	2017
Prof. Rachid BELHADJ	Member	Algeria	2017
Ms Laurence BOILLAT	Member	Switzerland	2017
Prof. Shuichi FURUYA	Member	Japan	2012
Dr. Åsa MOLDE	Member	Sweden	2017
Mr Mario J.A. OYARZÁBAL	Member	Argentina	2017
Mr Francisco REY MARCOS	Member	Spain	2017
Prof. Stelios E. PERRAKIS	Member	Greece	2001
Dr. Réka VARGA	Member	Hungary	2017
Dr. Justinas ŽILINSKAS	Member	Lithuania	2012

== See also ==
- Kunduz hospital airstrike
- Airstrikes on hospitals in Yemen

== Bibliography ==
- Frits Kalshoven: "The International Humanitarian Fact-Finding Commission: A Sleeping Beauty?" In: Humanitäres Völkerrecht - Informationsschriften. 4/2002. DRK-Generalsekretariat und Institut für Friedenssicherungsrecht und Humanitäres Völkerrecht, pp. 213–216, ISSN 0937-5414
- Erich Kussbach: The International Humanitarian Fact-Finding Commission. In: International and Comparative Law Quarterly. 43(1)/1994. British Institute of International and Comparative Law, pp. 174–185, ISSN 0020-5893
- Luigi Condorelli: The International Humanitarian Fact-Finding Commission. An Obsolete Tool or a Useful Measure to Implement International Humanitarian Law? In: International Review of the Red Cross. 842/2001. Internationales Komitee vom Roten Kreuz, pp. 393–406, ISSN 1560-7755
- Charles Garrawaya: The International Humanitarian Fact‐Finding Commission. In: Commonwealth Law Bulletin. 34(4)/2008. Routledge on behalf of the Legal and Constitutional Affairs Division of the Commonwealth Secretariat, pp. 813–816, ISSN 0305-0718
