= Joanne Liu =

Canadian physician and professor (born 1965)

Joanne Liu OQ FRCPC
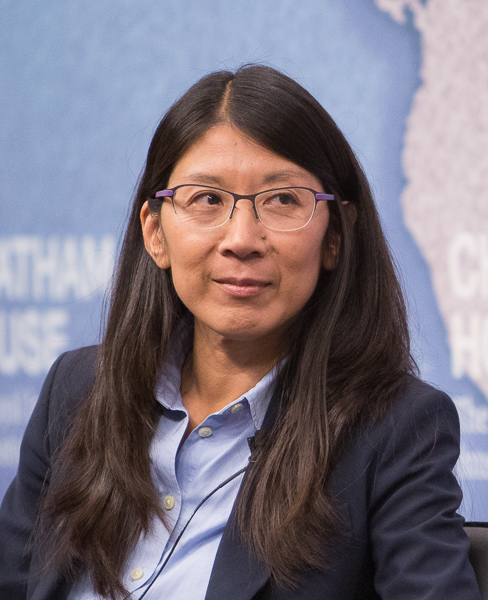
- Liu at Chatham House in 2015
- Born: 1965 (age 60–61); Quebec City, Quebec, Canada
- Education: McGill University
- Known for: International president of Médecins Sans Frontières/Doctors Without Borders (MSF)
- Awards: National Order of Quebec; Time 100
- Scientific career
- Fields: Pediatrics; Emergency medicine
- Workplaces: Médecins Sans Frontières; Université de Montréal; McGill University

Joanne Liu
- Traditional Chinese: 廖滿嫦
Transcriptions
Standard Mandarin
- Hanyu Pinyin: Liào Mǎncháng
Yue: Cantonese
- Yale Romanization: Liuh Múhn Sèuhng
- Jyutping: liu6 mun5 soeng4

Joanne Liu (born 1965) is a Canadian pediatric emergency medicine physician, Associate Professor of Medicine at the University of Montreal, Professor of Clinical Medicine at McGill University, and the previous International President of Médecins Sans Frontières/Doctors Without Borders (MSF). She was elected president during MSF's International General Assembly in June 2013.

== Early life and education ==
Joanne Liu was born on 4 November 1965, Quebec City, Quebec, Canada, the fifth child in Chinese immigrant family from Taishan, Guangdong that ran a Chinese restaurant. When she was thirteen, she read Et la Paix dans le monde docteur, a book about the experiences of a physician working with Doctors Without Borders during the Soviet–Afghan War and decided to become "a doctor without borders" one day.

During junior college, Cegep Champlain St. Lawrence, Quebec City, she travelled to Mali with Canadian Crossroads International. Liu graduated from the McGill University Faculty of Medicine and completed pediatric specialty training at the Université de Montréal-affiliated Centre hospitalier universitaire Sainte-Justine. She then completed a sub-specialty in pediatric emergency care at Bellevue Hospital Center of the New York University School of Medicine and an International Master's in Health Leadership degree at the McGill University Desautels Faculty of Management.

== Career ==
Liu started her career with Médecins sans Frontières, in 1996 when she worked with Malian refugees in Mauritania. Since then she has provided support through the 2004 Indian Ocean earthquake and tsunami; assisted in controlling a cholera epidemic in Haiti; helped Somali refugees in Kenya; and offered medical assistance in many conflict zones, including Palestine, Central African Republic and Sudan's Darfur region. She has also helped to develop one of the first programs to offer comprehensive medical care for survivors of sexual violence in the Republic of the Congo.

From 1999 to 2002, Liu was a programs manager at the Paris office of MSF. She then went on to work as the president of the board of directors of MSF in Canada between 2004 and 2009. She has helped to create and currently co-manages the organization's telemedicine project, which connects MSF physicians in 150 remote sites with a platform of over 300 medical specialists across the globe. By communicating through the specialist network, MSF field doctors can receive critical diagnoses and treatment recommendations for their patients within hours.

From 2002 to 2013, Liu served as a full-time Pediatric Emergency Physician at Ste-Justine Hospital in Montreal and at the Health Travel Clinic of the Centre hospitalier de l'Université de Montréal. She is also an associate professor at the Université de Montréal.

From 2013 to 2019, Liu served as International President of Médecins Sans Frontières (MSF), in Geneva.

On 2 September 2014, Liu gave a briefing to the United Nations General Assembly, urging member states to mobilize against the Ebola epidemic in West Africa.

On 7 October 2015, Liu demanded an independent investigation of the American bombing of the MSF hospital in Kunduz, Afghanistan. She denounced the bombing and suggested that it was a war crime.

From 2020 until 2021, Liu served as a member of the Independent Panel for Pandemic Preparedness and Response (IPPR), an independent group examining how the World Health Organization (WHO) and countries handled the COVID-19 pandemic, co-chaired by Helen Clark and Ellen Johnson Sirleaf.

== Positions ==
- Virchow Prize for Global Health, Member of the Council (2022–present)
- The New Humanitarian, Member of the Board of Directors (2020–present)
- Centre for Humanitarian Dialogue, Member of the Board (2019–present)
- Coalition for Epidemic Preparedness Innovations (CEPI), Member of the Board (2018–present)
- Drugs for Neglected Diseases Initiative (DNDI), Member of the Board of Directors
- McGill School of Population and Global Health (SPGH), Member of the International Advisory Board
