= Killing of Tito Minniti =

Italian pilot

Tito Minniti
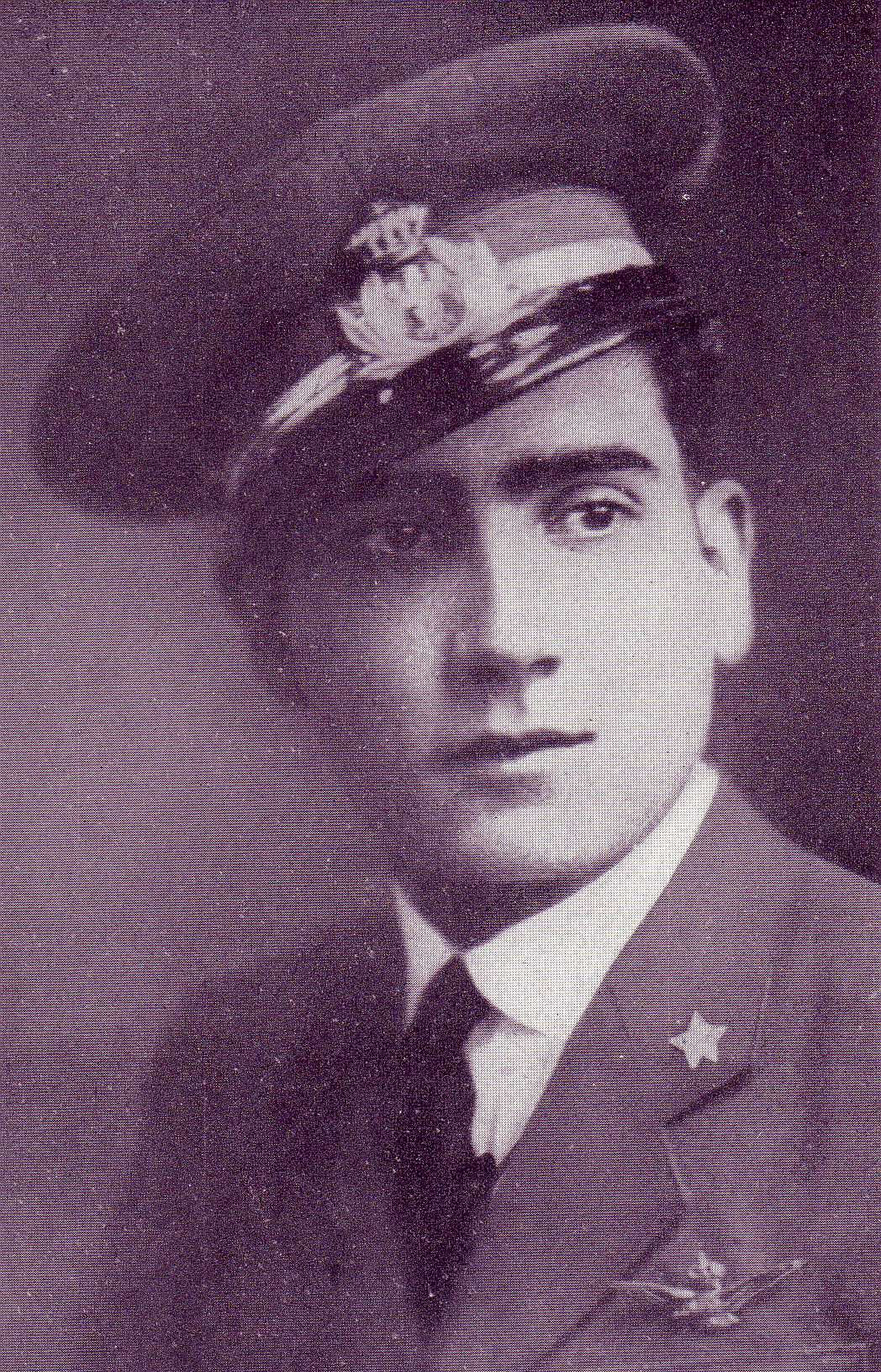
- Born: 31 July 1909; Placanica, Calabria, Kingdom of Italy
- Died: 26 December 1935 (aged 26); Degehabur, Ogaden, Ethiopia
- Military career
- Allegiance: Kingdom of Italy
- Branch: Regia Aeronautica
- Service years: 1933–1935
- Rank: Lieutenant
- Conflicts: Second Italo-Ethiopian War
- Awards: Gold Medal of Military Valour

Tito Minniti (31 July 1909 – 26 December 1935) was an Italian pilot who was killed during the Second Italo-Abyssinian War in 1935 near Degehabur. It is unknown whether he died in combat or after being captured by Ethiopian forces. His death and alleged torture became an atrocity story (together with the Gondrand massacre) proffered by the Italian government to justify their use of mustard gas against Ethiopian civilians. Minniti was posthumously decorated with the Italian Gold Medal of Valour.

== Life ==
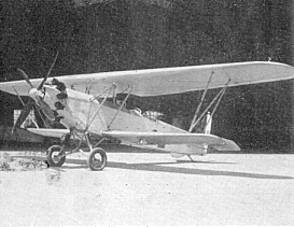
The Romeo Ro.1 airplane used by Tito Minniti

Tito Minniti was born in Placanica, near Reggio Calabria, Italy on July 31, 1909. He became a military pilot of the Regia Aeronautica in 1933. He had attained the rank of Lieutenant when he volunteered to fight in Ethiopia in 1935. He flew a number of missions over enemy territory.

On 26 December 1935 Minniti was flying a reconnaissance mission with an observer, Sergeant Livio Zannoni. He was forced to land behind enemy lines, probably due to engine trouble. Minnitti and Zannoni survived apparently uninjured, but were soon challenged by Ethiopians. What happened next is disputed. Both men were killed, but according to Rainer Baudendistel, "it was never established whether they died defending themselves or were killed after surrender". The only officially recorded testimony of the event, given by an Egyptian paramedic, asserted that Minniti was tortured and murdered by Ethiopian troops.

== Italian version ==
According to one version of events, Minniti and Zannoni fought the Imperial Ethiopian Army soldiers who approached. Minniti attacked them with the aircraft's machine gun, killing some of them. Eventually, he ran out of ammunition and was forced to surrender. Zannoni was killed, but Minniti was taken to the village of Bolali. Italian propaganda later declared that Minniti was subject to torture and mutilation before his death.

This version of events relied on the assertions of an attaché of the Egyptian Red Cross, Abdel Mohsein El Uisci, who later testified to the League of Nations and stated that the severed head and feet of Minniti were carried to the towns of Degehabur, Jijiga and Harar. El Uisci testified:

...Ethiopian soldiers cut the fingers of the Italian POW. Then their officer Manghestu undressed him (while the Italian was screaming in pain) and cut his sexual organ with a knife.... he died slowly of blood loss. The body of Minniti finally was cut in pieces and the head was placed on top of a bayonet to be delivered to the local Ras of Dagabur, Harrar....

The leader of the killers, Manghestu, took the genitals and told El Uisci that he intended to flay Minniti's body to make cigarette paper from the skin. El Uisci, again in Dagabur, said he had also witnessed the torture of another Italian soldier, who was mutilated, impaled and then transported on a stake, which pierced a metal bar that was lying on the back of two camels.

Castration of defeated enemies was a tradition in Ethiopia as was the taking of body parts as trophies. Italy had already raised the practice at the League of Nations, as part of its justification for the invasion. Isamael Daoud, El Uisci's superior, denied the truth of his account of events. The Italians argued that Daoud was in no position to dispute the accuracy of the story, as he was in Egypt at the time. Kamel Hamed and Labib Salamah, two other members of El Uisci's paramedic team in Ethiopia, supported El Uisci's assertions. In 1937, journalist and historian Indro Montanelli, then a supporter of Italian fascism, interviewed one of the Ethiopians who killed Minniti, who confirmed El Uisci's account.

== Ethiopian version ==
The Ethiopian authorities asserted that the two Italians had been killed not by Ethiopian troops but by local people, angered by the bombing of their villages. The local Ethiopian commander Dejazmach Nasibu Emmanual sent a messenger to the Italian General Rodolfo Graziani, giving the Ethiopian version of events and assuring him that prisoners were being treated in accordance with international law. The messenger was arrested, and Graziani did not reply. Nasibu repeated the Ethiopian version in radio broadcasts.

== Italian response ==
Graziani expressed outrage at the killing and ordered immediate bombings of Ethiopian troops. Two Red Cross camp hospitals in the area were also hit. He even ordered leaflets to be dropped, saying: "You have beheaded one of our airmen, infringing all human and international laws, under which prisoners are sacred and deserve respect. You will get what you deserve. Graziani." The Fascist regime later argued that their use of mustard gas was legitimate because of the alleged atrocity.

After the war, the bodies of Minniti and Zannoni were found, 200 metres from the downed aircraft, but the remains were too decayed and damaged by wild animals for the manner of their death to be determined.

== Aftermath ==
Mussolini promoted Minniti as a great Italian Royal Air Force hero. A heroic version of his last hours was circulated, according to which the plane was forced down by enemy anti-aircraft fire rather than by mechanical problems. Undaunted, the wounded Minniti managed to land safely and hold off the Ethiopians for as long as he could, to protect his incapacitated sergeant. The citation for his award stated that he fought "a titanic and indomitable struggle. Overwhelmed by the number and ferocity of the barbarian enemy he gloriously lost his life: a shining example of high military virtues, proud spirit of sacrifice and indomitable Italian values".

Flags in Minniti's hometown were flown at half-mast. His father was quoted saying, "I have given a son to the fatherland in the World War and I do not regret giving the fatherland another. For the greatness of Italy I am ready to offer the lives of my other four!" The Reggio Calabria Airport, near his birthplace, was named after Minniti and still bears his name. The Italian sculptor Arturo Martini created a memorial entitled "Tito Minniti Hero of Africa" in 1936, depicting his headless naked body tied to a tree in a cruciform pose. It is preserved in the Galleria Nazionale d'Arte Moderna in Rome.

The legitimacy of the Italian response was much debated. In 1937, the antifascist writer Giuseppe Antonio Borgese gave his own version of events, arguing that Graziani merely seized on the incident to excuse his actions:

An incident in January, eagerly welcomed, flung open the gates of the Empire. Tito Minniti, an Italian aviator compelled by engine trouble to alight within the enemy lines, appeared to the Ethiopians as if he were about to surrender. Then, when a substantial number of them had thronged around the stranded airplane, he —gallantly, there is no denying— started machine-gunning them at closest range. They beheaded him. Sabre rather than gun was the ordinary weapon of the primitive Abyssinian warrior. This was the coveted "Abyssinian atrocity." It was megaphonically declared that the war would be pushed on with all means, and that the Abyssinian savagery deserved reprisals. The reprisals were poison gases.

Ferdinando Pedriali, of the official Ufficio Storico Aviazione Militare, wrote in 2000 that during the Italo-Ethiopian war "the killing of hundreds of wounded and prisoners, Italian and Eritrean, was the norm, not the exception" and that such actions potentially legitimated the use of gas.

== See also ==
- Second Italo-Abyssinian War
- Timeline of the Second Italo-Abyssinian War
- Dolo hospital airstrike

== Sources ==
- Baudendistel, Rainer (2006). Between bombs and good intentions: the Red Cross and the Italo-Ethiopian War, 1935-1936. Berghahn Books. ISBN 1-84545-035-3.
- Colloredo, Pierluigi (2009). I Pilastri del Romano Impero [The Pillars of the Roman Empire]. Genoa: Associazione Culturale Italia.
- Montanelli, Indro (1937). Guerra e pace in Africa Orientale [War and peace in East Africa]. Florence: Vallecchi.
- Nicolle, David (1997). The Italian Invasion of Abyssinia 1935-1936. Westminster, Maryland: Osprey. ISBN 978-1-85532-692-7.
- Pedriali, Ferdinando (2000). L'Aeronautica italiana nelle guerre coloniali [The Italian Air Force in the colonial wars]. Rome: Ufficio Storico Aeronautica Militare.
