= Destruction of the healthcare system =

Type of war crime

Destruction of the healthcare system is a war crime that may consist of such actions as attacks on health care facilities such as hospitals, harm to healthcare workers, blocking of humanitarian aid and other supplies needed by the healthcare system. It has been reported during the Israeli blockade of Gaza and Gaza war (see Attacks on health facilities during the Gaza war), Russian invasion of Ukraine, Syrian civil war, and Sudan conflict. In order to prevent belligerents from justifying the destruction of the healthcare system by claiming that enemies were using the facilities as human shields, Neve Gordon and Nicola Perugini propose clarifying that all attacks that damage the healthcare system are war crimes.

== See also ==
- War crimes
- List of genocides
