= Kunduz hospital airstrike =

2015 U.S. air strike on a hospital in Afghanistan

Coordinates: 36.7180°N 68.8623°E

- Part of Battle of Kunduz and the War in Afghanistan (2001–2021)
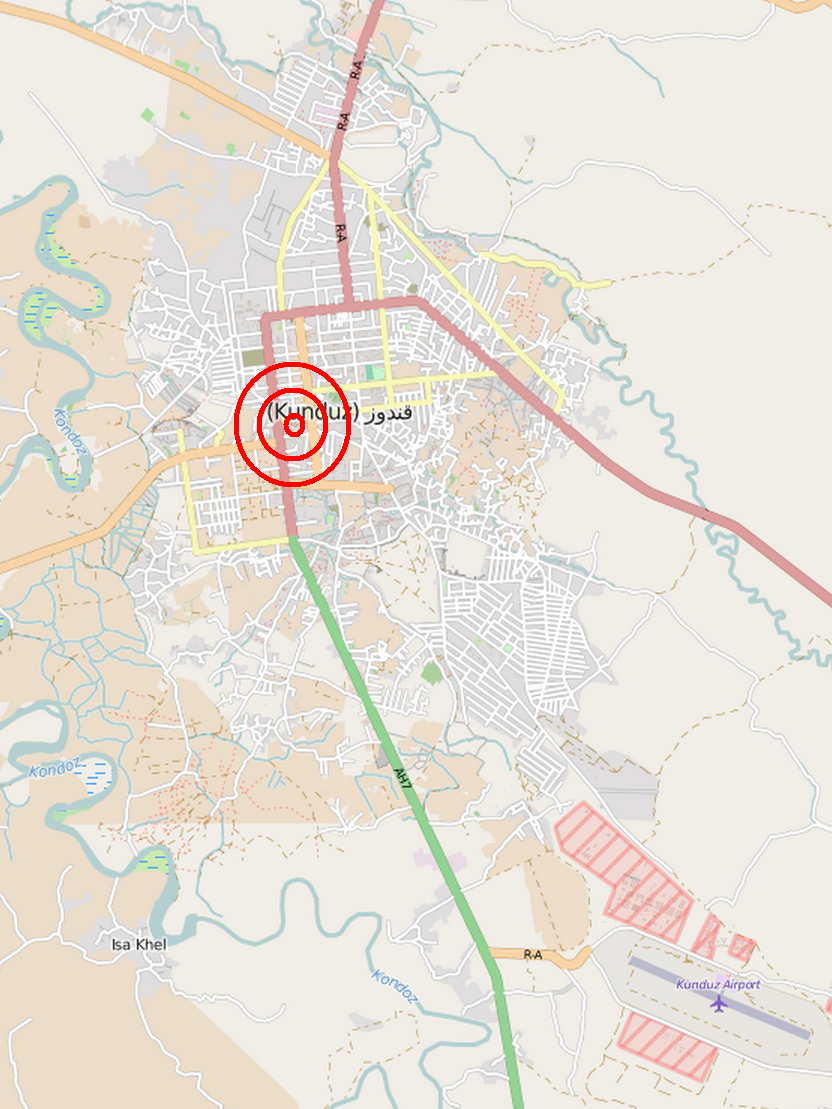
- Location of Kunduz MSF Trauma Center within Kunduz
- Type: Airstrike
- Location: Kunduz Province, Afghanistan
- Target: Kunduz Trauma Centre, Médecins Sans Frontières hospital
- Date: 3 October 2015
- Executed by: AC-130U, call sign "Hammer", assigned to 4th Special Operations Squadron, United States Air Force
- Casualties: 42 killed over 30 injured

On 3 October 2015, a United States Air Force AC-130U gunship attacked the Kunduz Trauma Centre operated by Médecins Sans Frontières (MSF, or Doctors Without Borders) in the city of Kunduz, in the eponymous province in northern Afghanistan. 42 people were killed and over 30 were injured. MSF condemned the incident, calling it a deliberate breach of international humanitarian law and a war crime. It further stated that all warring parties had been notified about the hospital and its operations well in advance.

The United States military initially said the airstrike was carried out to defend U.S. forces on the ground. Later, the United States commander in Afghanistan, General John F. Campbell, said the airstrike was requested by Afghan forces who had come under Taliban fire. Finally, Campbell said the airstrike was a U.S. decision, made in the U.S. chain of command and not requested by Afghan forces. Campbell said that the attack was "a mistake", further stating: "We would never intentionally target a protected medical facility." The USCENTCOM 15-6 report stated that General Campbell's own lack of strategic guidance and dissemination of certain Rules of Engagement were major contributing factors that led to the command and control breakdown prior to the airstrike. Anonymous sources alleged that cockpit recordings showed the AC-130 crew questioned the strike's legality.

On 7 October 2015, President Barack Obama issued an apology and announced the United States would be making condolence payments of $6,000 to the families of those killed in the airstrike. Three investigations of the incident were conducted by NATO, a joint United States-Afghan group, and the United States Department of Defense. The Department of Defense released its findings on 29 April 2016. MSF has called for an international and independent probe, saying the armed forces who carried out the airstrike cannot conduct an impartial investigation of their own actions.

== Background ==
On 28 September 2015, Taliban militants seized the city of Kunduz, driving out government forces. After the reinforcements arrived, the Afghan army, backed by U.S. air support, began an offensive operation to regain control of the city. After several days of fighting, Afghan forces claimed to have retaken the city. However, fighting continued into October 3.

MSF had informed all warring parties of the location of its hospital complex. MSF personnel had contacted U.S. military officials as recently as 29 September to reconfirm the precise location of the hospital. Two days prior to the attack Carter Malkasian, adviser to the Joint Chiefs of Staff, emailed MSF asking if the facility had Taliban militants "holed up" inside.

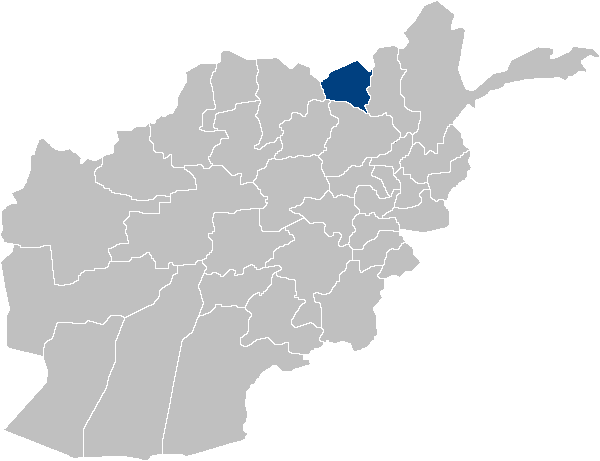
Location of province Kunduz in Afghanistan

A US special operations unit was nearby and communicating with the aircraft that delivered the airstrike. US special operations analysts were gathering intelligence on the hospital days before the airstrike because they believed it was being used by a Pakistani operative to coordinate Taliban activity. The Associated Press reported that the analysts had circled the hospital on their maps as they tracked the Taliban operative. General Joseph Votel headed US Special Operations Command at the time of the attack.

== Attack ==
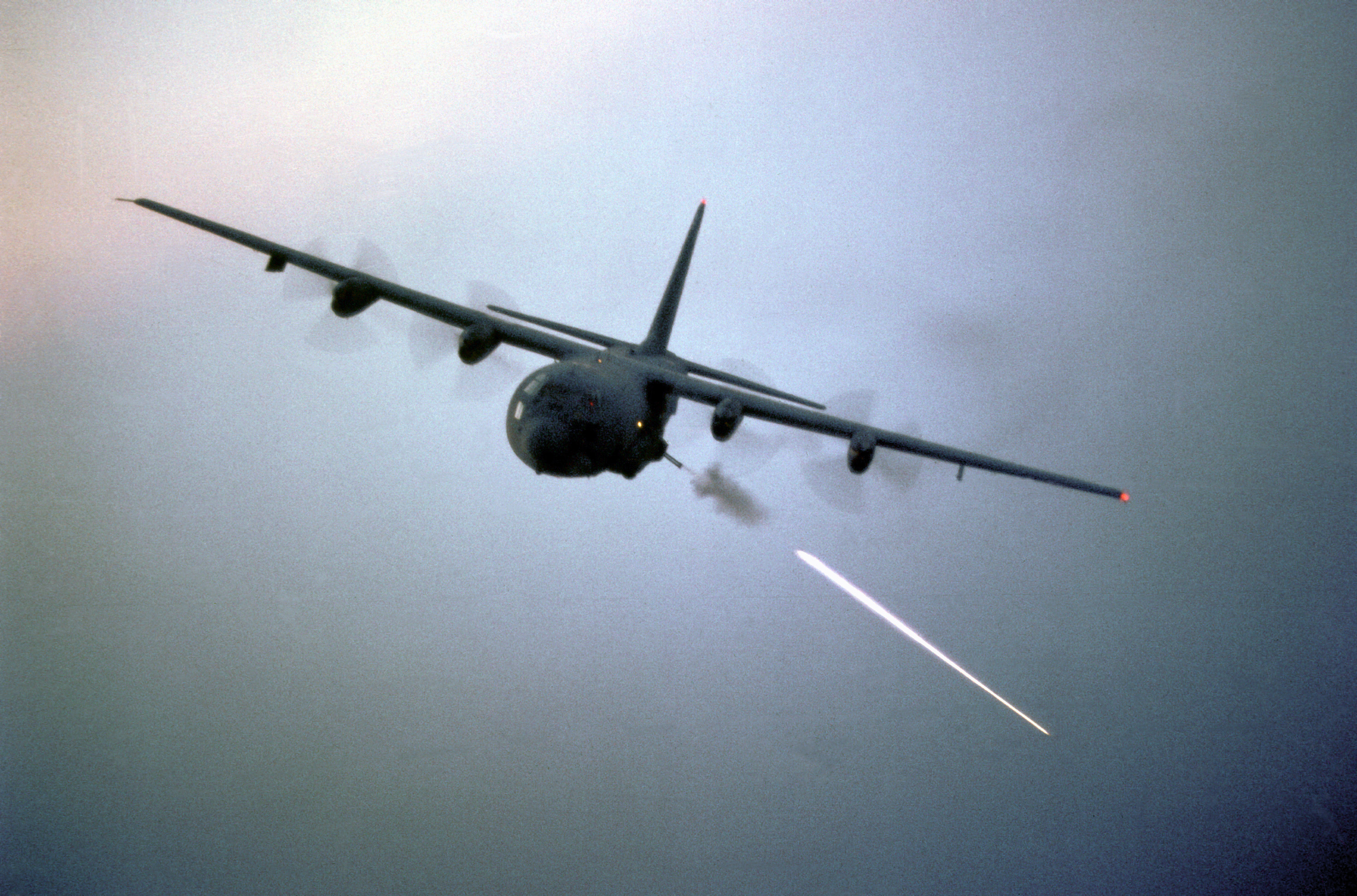
A US Air Force AC-130 Hercules firing its weapons

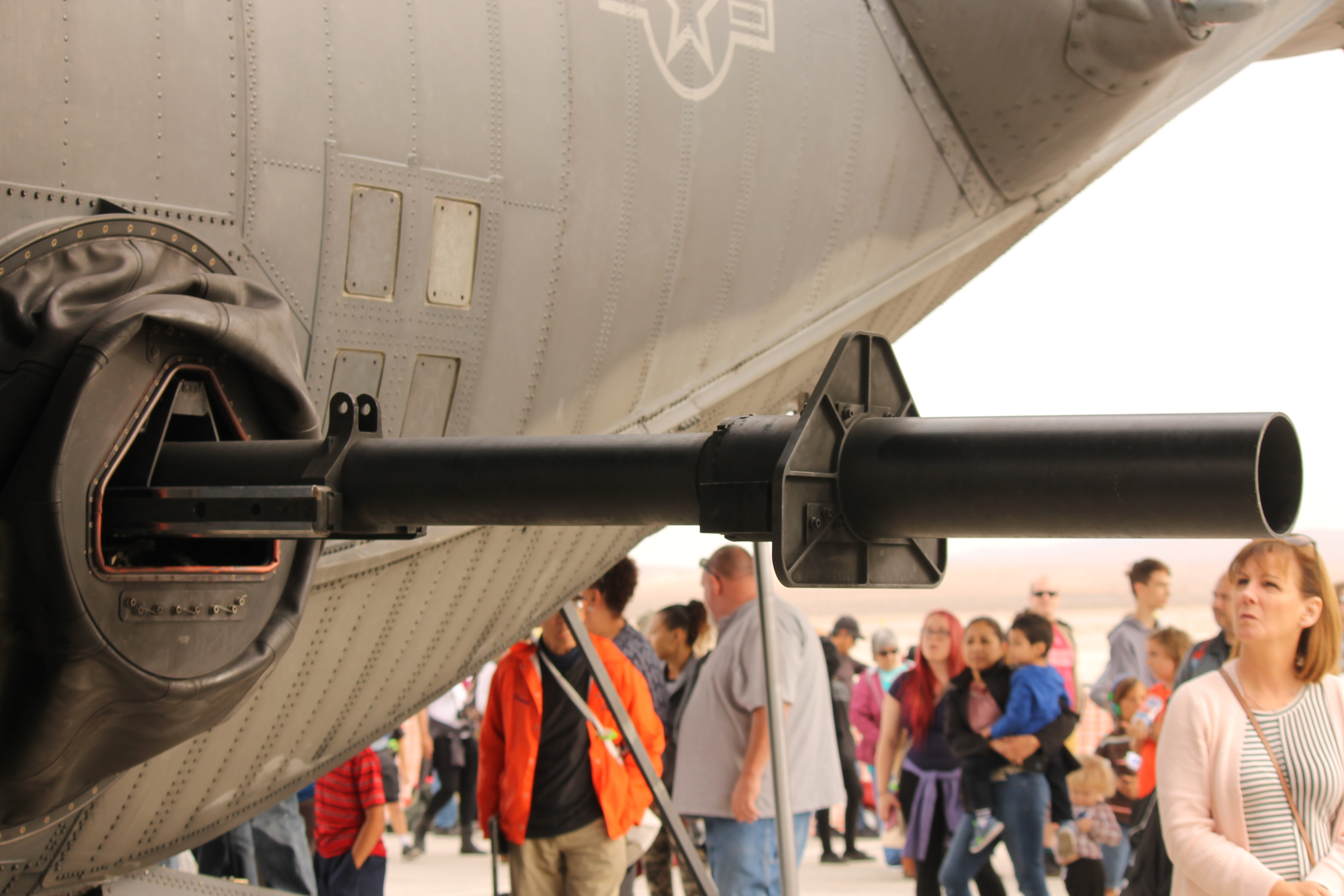
An M102 howitzer on an AC-130

Médecins Sans Frontières reported that between 02:08 and 03:15 local time (UTC+04:30) on the night of 3 October, the organization's Kunduz hospital was struck by "a series of aerial bombing raids". The humanitarian organization said the hospital was "hit several times" in the course of the attack, and that the building was "partially destroyed". It further said the hospital had been "repeatedly & precisely hit" and that the attack had continued for 30 minutes after MSF staff contacted U.S. and Afghan officials. The Associated Press reported that US Special Forces were a half mile away from the hospital at the time of the attack, defending the governor of Kunduz province. Likewise, Afghan forces were a half mile away. 42 people, including doctors, staff members and patients, were killed in the attack.

=== Confirmation and response ===
The U.S. military initially said there had been an airstrike in the area to defend U.S. forces on the ground, and that "there may have been collateral damage to a nearby medical facility". On 15 October NBC Nightly News reported that according to Defense Department sources, cockpit recordings from the attacking AC-130 gunship "reveal that the crew actually questioned whether the airstrike was legal".

U.S. and NATO Commander John F. Campbell later confirmed that a U.S. AC-130 gunship made the attack on the hospital and that it was a US decision, contrary to earlier reports that the strike had been requested by local Afghan forces under Taliban fire. He specified that the decision to use aerial fire was "made within the US chain of command". Campbell said the attack was "a mistake", and "We would never intentionally target a protected medical facility." White House spokesman Josh Earnest defended U.S. forces, saying the U.S. Department of Defense "goes to greater lengths and places a higher premium on avoiding civilian casualties" than any other military in the world, and hinted the U.S. may compensate victims and their families. U.S. President Barack Obama apologized to MSF president Joanne Liu for the incident, saying it was a mistake and was intended to target Taliban fighters. The U.S. committed to making condolence payments to the families of the victims and to help with the rebuilding of the hospital.

The Afghan Interior Ministry spokesman Sediq Sediqi confirmed an airstrike on 3 October, saying that "10–15 terrorists were hiding in the hospital" and confirming that hospital workers had been killed. The Afghan Ministry of Defense and a representative of the police chief in Kunduz also said that Taliban fighters were hiding in the hospital compound at the time of the attack, the latter claiming that they were using it as a human shield.

Médecins Sans Frontières said no Taliban fighters were in the compound. Christopher Stokes, General Director of Médecins Sans Frontières Belgium, said in a statement late 4 October 2015: "MSF is disgusted by the recent statements coming from some Afghanistan government authorities justifying the attack on its hospital in Kunduz. These statements imply that Afghan and U.S. forces working together decided to raze to the ground a fully functioning hospital – with more than 180 staff and patients inside – because they claim that members of the Taliban were present. This amounts to an admission of a war crime." Stokes said, "If there was a major military operation going on there, our staff would have noticed. And that wasn't the case when the strikes occurred." On 5 October, the organization released a statement saying, "Their [U.S.] description of the attack keeps changing – from collateral damage, to a tragic incident, to now attempting to pass responsibility to the Afghanistan government. ... There can be no justification for this horrible attack."

== Legality ==
Attacks on medical facilities in a non-international armed conflict are forbidden under international humanitarian law unless the facilities "are used to commit hostile acts, outside their humanitarian function". Even if armed groups are inappropriately using the facility for shelter, the rule of proportionality usually forbids such attacks because of the high potential for civilian casualties. Human Rights Watch said the laws of war require the attacking force to issue a warning, and wait a reasonable time for a response, before attacking a medical unit being misused by combatants.

At the time of the airstrikes, MSF was treating women and children and wounded combatants from both sides of the conflict. MSF estimates that of the 105 patients present at the time of the attack, three or four of the patients were wounded government combatants and approximately 20 patients were wounded Taliban. MSF General Director Christopher Stokes said, "Some public reports are circulating that the attack on our hospital could be justified because we were treating Taliban. Wounded combatants are patients under international law, and must be free from attack and treated without discrimination. Medical staff should never be punished or attacked for providing treatment to wounded combatants." Furthermore the hospital had a strictly enforced "NO WEAPONS" policy.

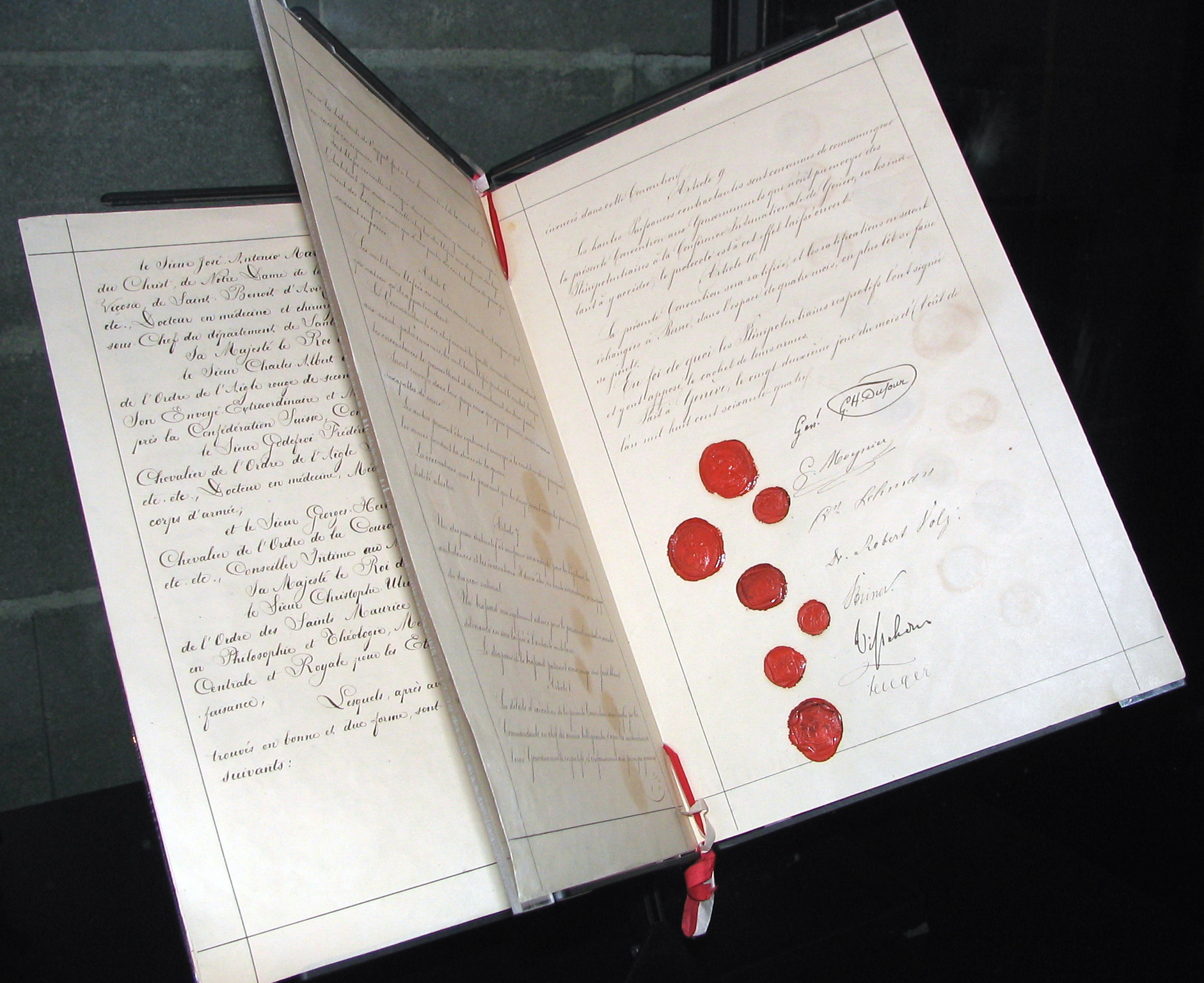
Original Geneva Conventions

Article 11 of Additional Protocol II of the 1949 Geneva Conventions protects hospitals in a non-international armed conflict (which the NATO war in Afghanistan was since 19 June 2002). However, the U.S. is not a party to Protocol II and there is no mention of precautionary measures within the treaty unlike its Protocol I counterpart. Former International Criminal Tribunal prosecutor M. Cherif Bassiouni suggested that the attack could be prosecuted as a war crime under the Conventions if the attack was intentional or if it represented gross negligence noting, "even if it were proven that the Kunduz hospital had lost that right of protection due to infiltration by Taliban, the U.S. military personnel responsible for the attack would have to prove it was a military necessity to strike that hospital", even if Taliban forces were indeed using it as a human shield, or else claim that the military was unaware of the hospital's location, risking prosecution for negligence. Nonetheless, he said it is unlikely that the case will ever be tried in an international court, because "the U.S. is unlikely to turn any of their service members over to an outside body for prosecution even after facing its own military legal system." Erna Paris speculated that concern over violation of international law may be the cause of the United States' delay in publishing its own report on the attack. She commented, "To leave MSF dangling would seriously undermine the established laws of war."

Writing about the attack, human rights lawyer Jonathan Horowitz noted of that "Under certain specific and narrowly tailored conditions, individuals can be attacked even when their actions fall short of carrying weapons or opening fire on the enemy. But this alone does not necessarily justify the attack on the hospital." He emphasized the need for an independent investigation, noting that secrecy from the US and Afghanistan would be damaging to any investigation.

== Casualties ==
Previous to 12 December when new figures were released, casualty reports listed 30 dead including 13 MSF staff (three of them doctors), ten patients, and seven burned beyond recognition and as of yet unidentified. MSF reported that six intensive care patients were burned to death in their beds, and another patient died after staff had to leave the individual on the operating table. They reported that the 12 staff killed were all Afghan nationals, and that all three of their international staff members who were present survived. A review of the incident released on 7 November by MSF reported that some medical staff were decapitated and lost limbs to shrapnel and others were shot from the air as they tried to flee the burning building.

On 12 December, MSF released a new report following an "exhaustive investigation [that] included combing through the rubble of the hospital to find further human remains, interviewing family members of missing victims and crosschecking with other hospitals." The new figure for the number of deaths is "at least 42 people", including 14 staff members, 24 patients and four relatives of patients.

== Hospital evacuation and shutdown ==
The attack made the hospital unusable. All critical patients were referred to other providers, and all MSF staff were evacuated from Kunduz. Before the bombing, the MSF's hospital was the only active medical facility in the area. It has been the only trauma center in northeastern Afghanistan. In 2014, more than 22,000 patients were treated at this emergency trauma center and more than 5,900 surgeries were performed.

== Aftermath ==
=== Accusations of biased press coverage ===
Glenn Greenwald of The Intercept accused CNN and The New York Times of "deliberately obscuring who perpetrated the Afghan hospital attack" during the first thirty-six hours after the airstrike, stating that their reporting was "designed to obfuscate who carried out this atrocity." Ben Norton noted in FAIR, "Ambiguous, misleading and even downright dishonest language abounds throughout the coverage."

=== Investigations ===
==== MSF's internal review ====
MSF does not ask the allegiance of its patients. However, judging from their patients' clothing and other indications, MSF estimated that of the 105 patients at the time of the attack, between three and four of the patients were wounded government combatants, while approximately 20 patients were wounded Taliban.

MSF's investigation confirmed that "the MSF's rules in the hospital were implemented and respected, including the 'no weapons' policy; MSF was in full control of the hospital before and at the time of the airstrikes; there were no armed combatants within the hospital compound and there was no fighting from or in the direct vicinity of the trauma centre before the airstrikes." MSF stated in their press release presenting the review that "wounded combatants are patients and must be free from attack and treated without discrimination; medical staff should never be punished or attacked for providing treatment to wounded combatants."

==== Afghan investigation ====
Afghan president Ashraf Ghani appointed a five-member commission to investigate the airstrike as well as the Battle of Kunduz more generally. As of 2018, no findings were made public.

==== NATO investigation ====
NATO said it was continuing its inquiry into the bombing and had appointed three US military officers from outside the chain of command to handle the investigation to ensure impartiality.

As of 2018, no findings were made public.

==== U.S. internal investigation, apology, and reparations ====
On the day of the attack, Secretary of Defense Ash Carter said that an investigation had begun in coordination with the Afghan government. Eleven days after the attack, MSF said an American tank forcibly entered the hospital: "Their unannounced and forced entry damaged property, destroyed potential evidence and caused stress and fear." The tank smashed the gate of the hospital complex. The MSF executives who happened to be in the hospital at the time were told that the tank was carrying a US-NATO-Afghan team investigating the attack. A US captain claimed they were unaware of any remaining MSF staff at the site and were in the process of doing damage assessment. On 25 November 2015, General John F. Campbell, the American commander in Afghanistan, spoke about the results of their internal investigation and described the incident as "the direct result of avoidable human error, compounded by process and equipment failures." Campbell said that the internal investigation had shown that the AC-130 gunship crew misidentified the clinic as a nearby Taliban-controlled government building. The American gunship had identified the building based on a visual description from Afghan troops, and did not consult their no-strike list, which included the coordinates of the hospital as provided by MSF. Campbell said electronic equipment malfunctions on the gunship prevented it from accessing email and images, while a navigation error meant its targeting equipment also misidentified the target buildings. The internal report states the aircraft fired 211 shells at the building in 29 minutes, before American commanders realized the mistake and ordered the attack to stop. The report found that the MSF facility "did not have an internationally-recognized symbol to identify it as a medical facility". Joe Goldstein stated that the facility did have a MSF flag laying on the roof, though this is not a recognized protective mark. According to the report, 12 minutes into the operation, the US military was contacted by MSF, but the faulty electronics on the plane prevented the message from getting through until the attack was over.

A final report by the Pentagon, released 29 April 2016, reaffirmed the incident as an accident, and said it thus did not amount to a war crime. Sixteen members of the U.S. military were disciplined as a result of the investigation, though none were criminally charged. Twelve personnel involved in the strike were punished with "suspension and removal from command, letters of reprimand, formal counselling and extensive retraining". The U.S. government said that more than 170 condolence payments had been made, $3,000 for wounded people and $6,000 for dead, and $5.7 million was set aside for the hospital's reconstruction.

==== Calls for independent investigations ====
Médecins Sans Frontières called for an independent inquiry of the air attack on the hospital, accusing the United States of committing a "war crime" and calling an internal U.S. investigation insufficient. The call for an independent investigation was supported by The Lancet, MSF suggested that the International Humanitarian Fact-Finding Commission, which is based in Bern, should undertake this work.

Secretary-General of the United Nations Ban Ki-moon said "hospitals and medical personnel are explicitly protected under international humanitarian law" and called for an independent investigation. Nicholas Haysom, the Secretary-General's Special Representative for Afghanistan called "on all parties to the conflict to respect and protect medical and humanitarian personnel and facilities". UN High Commissioner for Human Rights, Zeid Ra'ad Al Hussein responded that "This event is utterly tragic, inexcusable, and possibly even criminal" and likewise called for an independent investigation.

Human Rights Watch (HRW) called the attack a "shocking development" and said "All forces are obligated to do their utmost to avoid causing civilian harm." They called for "an impartial, thorough and transparent investigation into the incident to establish the circumstances of the attack". Following the US internal investigation HRW urged the US to "establish an independent panel outside the military chain of command with the aim of establishing the facts and assessing possible culpability" and further said that "contradictory statements since the October 3 airstrike raise concerns about the credibility of these investigations".

Amnesty International expressed "serious concerns about the Department of Defense's questionable track record of policing itself" and called for an independent investigation.

The only investigations that have been done are by MSF, the US or Afghan government, and NATO; therefore, no independent investigation has ever occurred.

== See also ==
- Airstrikes on hospitals in Yemen
- Dolo hospital airstrike
- 2026 Kabul hospital airstrike
- List of massacres in Afghanistan
- United States-led air strike on Bir Mahali village between 30 April and 1 May 2015, killing at least 64 civilians
- Mariupol hospital airstrike
