= Kunduz Trauma Centre =

- Médecins Sans Frontières

Geography
- Location: 36.7180°N 68.8623°E, Kunduz, Kunduz, Afghanistan

Organisation
- Type: General

Services
- Emergency department: Yes
- Beds: 140

History
- Opened: 2011
- Closed: 2015

Links
- Lists: Hospitals in Afghanistan

The Kunduz Trauma Centre was a hospital operated by Médecins Sans Frontières (MSF) in Kunduz, Afghanistan from 29 August 2011 until 3 October 2015 when it was destroyed in an airstrike by a United States Air Force AC-130U gunship.

Before the bombing, the MSF's hospital was the only active medical facility in the area. It has been the only trauma center in northeastern Afghanistan.

In 2014, more than 22,000 patients were treated at this emergency trauma center and more than 5,900 surgeries were performed.

== Facilities ==
The hospital was opened on 29 August 2011 with 55 beds, two operating theatres, an intensive care unit, and X-ray and laboratory facilities, with separate male and female inpatient wards.

By late 2012, the number of beds had increased to 58.

When it was destroyed, the centre had added a third operating theatre.

== July 2015 incident ==
In a previous incident, on 1 July 2015, heavily armed men from the Afghan National Army attempted to arrest three patients by entering the compound with weapons, physically assaulting three staff members and threatening one staff member at gunpoint. According to MSF, approximately one hour later the armed men left the hospital compound without the patients.

== Evacuation and shutdown ==
The US airstrike in October 2015 made the hospital unusable. All critical patients were referred to other providers, and all MSF staff were evacuated from Kunduz.
