= Saudi-led airstrikes on Yemen =

Airstrikes during the Yemeni Civil War

A Saudi Arabian-led military intervention in Yemen began in 2015, in an attempt to influence the outcome of the Yemeni Civil War. Saudi Arabia, spearheading a coalition of nine Arab states, began carrying out airstrikes in neighbouring Yemen and imposing an aerial and naval blockade on 26 March 2015, heralding a military intervention code-named Operation Decisive Storm (Arabic: عملية عاصفة الحزم, romanized: Amaliyyat `Āṣifat al-Ḥazm). More than 130 health facilities (2019) in Yemen have been destroyed by a series of airstrikes conducted by the Saudi Arabian-led coalition since March 2015. Many of these have been public health hospitals staffed or supported by Doctors Without Borders (MSF). Critics of the assaults say the airstrikes are war crimes in violation of the protections of health care facilities afforded by the internationally recognized rules of war and have called for independent investigations.

Many other civilians targets, including schools, and school buses in Yemen are also bombed by the Saudi-led coalition.

According to a report by the United Nations in 2022, 2,900 schools were damaged, destroyed, or unused during the Yemeni Civil War.

The UN accused the Saudi-led coalition of "complete disregard for human life".

== Timeline ==
=== October 2015 – Saada airstrike ===
Doctors Without Borders reported that a Saudi Arabian-led coalition airstrike on 26 October 2015 had completely destroyed the Médecins Sans Frontières hospital in Saada, in northwestern Yemen, including the operating room. The first strike hit an unused part of the hospital, so the facility was completely evacuated at once. There were no direct casualties. The spokesman for the coalition forces, Brig-Gen Ahmed al-Asiri, disclaimed responsibility for the attack.

"With the hospital destroyed, at least 200,000 people now have no access to lifesaving medical care", MSF said. "This attack is another illustration of a complete disregard for civilians in Yemen, where bombings have become a daily routine," said Hassan Boucenine, MSF head of mission in Yemen. The GPS coordinates of the only hospital in the Haydan district were regularly shared with the Saudi-led coalition, and the roof of the facility was clearly identified with the MSF logo, he said. Abdallah al-Mouallimi, the Saudi ambassador to the United Nations, said the coordinates were inaccurate, although he admitted that the airstrike was "a mistake".

UNICEF reported that the hospital in Saada was the 39th health center hit in Yemen since March, when the violence escalated. MSF noted that the Saudi-led coalition had been bombing hospitals across Yemen for since January 2015. As many as 130 health facilities have been hit. "More children in Yemen may well die from a lack of medicines and healthcare than from bullets and bombs," its executive director Anthony Lake said in a statement. He added that critical shortages of fuel, medication, electricity and water could mean many more will close. Amnesty International said the strike may amount to a war crime and called for an independent investigation.

=== December 2015 – Taiz airstrike ===
On 3 December 2015, an airstrike by the Saudi Arabian-led intervention in Yemen hit a health center in Taiz, wounding nine people. Two hospital staff were among the wounded. "The bombing of civilians and hospitals is a violation of international humanitarian law," said Jerome Alin, head of MSF head of mission in Yemen.

=== January 2016 – Razeh district airstrike ===
On 10 January 2016, Shiara Hospital, supported by MSF in Razeh district, Saada Governorate, Northern Yemen, was hit by a projectile and shrapnel from the Saudi-led coalition. Six people died and another 7 were injured, including three MSF staff, two of them in critical condition. Several buildings at the medical facility collapsed after the attack, although the critical areas of the hospital were not destroyed. The rocket hit a corridor leading from the main gate to the hospital buildings, with a metal fence alongside. The wounded were hit by shrapnel from the missile, and also by shards of metal from the fence. The injuries were brutal. Vickie Hawkins, Executive Director of MSF-UK, said, "... there is a risk that "errors" in war situations will become normalised—just as "collateral damage" has been normalised in people's minds since the first Gulf War. This would provide the perfect alibi for armies to shrug off accusations of war crimes and crimes against humanity. It perpetuates impunity."

In a separate attack by the Saudi-led coalition, an airstrike was reported to have hit a center for the blind in the capital Sana'a, resulting in multiple injuries.

=== August 2016 – Abs district hospital airstrike ===
On 15 August 2016, after the collapse of a UN-sponsored cease-fire, an airstrike by the Saudi Arabian-led intervention in Yemen destroyed a hospital operated by Yemen's Ministry of Health and supported by MSF and UNICEF in Abs district, Hajjah Governorate in northwestern Yemen. The bombardment struck the hospital's triage area near the emergency room and killed at least 19 and wounded 24 people. At the time of the attack, there were 23 patients in the surgery ward, 25 in the maternity ward, 13 newborns and 12 patients in the pediatric ward, MSF said. The hospital had a 14-bed emergency room, a maternity unit and a surgical unit. Hospital staff were among the dead and wounded. “There were no armed people there,” a witness said. The hospital was reportedly treating child victims of another airstrike on a school in the town of Haydan, in neighboring Saada province, in which 10 children died and another 30 were wounded, all between the ages of 8 and 15 years. MSF has now withdrawn its staff members from Haydan, Razeh, Al Gamouri and Yasnim hospitals in Saada governorate and Abs and Al Gamouri hospitals in Hajjah governorate. Ban Ki-moon, the United Nations secretary general, condemned the attack in a statement, emphasizing that antagonists in the Yemen conflict had damaged or destroyed more than 70 health facilities since the hostilities began 17 months ago.

=== June 2018 – Airstrike on cholera treatment center in Abs ===
Doctors Without Borders reported that a Saudi Arabian coalition airstrike struck a new Médecins Sans Frontières cholera treatment center in Abs, in northwestern Yemen. Doctors Without Borders reported that they had provided GPS coordinates to The Kingdom of Saudi Arabia on twelve separate occasions, and had received nine written responses confirming receipt of those coordinates

=== 2 August 2018 – Hudaydah hospital airstrike ===
On 2 August 2018, airstrikes on hospital, harbor and fish market in Al Hudaydah killed at least 55 people and wounded 124.

=== 26 March 2019 – Saada hospital airstrike ===
A missile blew up a gas station near a hospital in Saada Governorate, which damaged the hospital and killed eight civilians, five of them children.

=== 7 April 2019 airstrike ===
Air raids by a Saudi-UAE-led coalition killed at least 11 civilians, including school children and left more than 39 people wounded in Sanaa, according to an Al Jazeera report. Also The Associated Press said 13 were killed, including 7 children, and more than 100 were wounded. Youssef al-Hadrii, a spokesman for the Houthi-controlled health ministry, said most of the children killed in the bombing of houses and a school since the war beginning. There was no comment from the coalition.

=== 6 November 2019 attack ===
According to aid group and Yemeni officials, 8 people including 3 civilians were killed by a Houthi drone and missile strike attack in Mocha that targeted a refugee camp and a hospital ran by Doctors without Borders, causing the hospital to shut down.

== See also ==
- Casualty recording
- Yemen cholera outbreak
- Famine in Yemen
- Kunduz hospital airstrike in Afghanistan
- Saudi-led intervention in the Yemeni civil war
- Saudi Arabia and weapons of mass destruction
- Blockade of Yemen
