= Shahjahan Noori =

Afghan Police Chief (1965–2011)

- شاه جهان نوری
- Born: March 30, 1965; Takhar Province, Afghanistan
- Died: May 28, 2011 (aged 46); Takhar Province, Afghanistan
- Military career
- Branch: Military of Afghanistan Afghan National Police Ministry of Defense (Afghanistan)
- Service years: 1981–2011
- Rank: Major General
- Nickname: Maulana Shahjahan Noori
- Commands: Commander during the Soviet–Afghan War; Commander of the anti-Taliban United Islamic Front under Ahmad Shah Massoud; Field Commander of Northern Alliance Forces - Takhar (October 2001); Police Chief of Badakhshan (2003–2006); Police Chief of Ghor (2006–2009); Police Chief of Takhar (2010–2011)
- Conflicts: Soviet–Afghan War; War in Afghanistan (1996–2001); War in Afghanistan (2001–present)

Shahjahan Noori (Persian/Dari: شاه جهان نوری) (30 March 1965 – 28 May 2011), also known as General Shahjahan Noori, was an Afghan guerrilla, military, and police commander active during resistance against the Soviet invasion and the fight against terrorist groups such as the Taliban and Al-Qaeda, between 1981 and 2011.

== Military career ==
=== Afghan-Soviet War ===
Noori joined the Ahmad Shah Massoud Central Units/Special Forces (Qeta'at-e-Markazi - the forces which later formed Afghan Armed Forces) military training camp in October 1985, where he received military and political training. In 1986, Noori conducted the captures of villages and districts including the Farkhar, Andarab and Nahrin garrisons, and Kalafgan and Kuran wa Munjan garrisons in 1987.

In 1985, at the time when the communist government was on the verge of collapse, Ahmad Shah Massoud assigned Noori to lead a group of nearly one thousand Mujahideen, including many senior commanders, with a political delegation to handover the security responsibilities in the strategic border area of Hairatan, near Mazar-i-Sharif, from General Abdul Momen of the 70th division of the Afghan Army of the Mohammad Najibullah government.

=== During Islamic State of Afghanistan, 1991-1996 ===
After the falling of the Moscow-backed government, Mujaheedin took control of Kabul, General Noori became the commander of 32nd Regiment in Kabul. In 1993, he was promoted to the rank of brigadier general by President Burhanuddin Rabbani.

==== Resistance against Taliban and Al-Qaeda 1996-2001 ====
In 1996 Kabul fell to hand of Taliban, and the Islamic State of Afghanistan retreated to the north of country. General Noori established the first command and control and defensive line in Bangi district of Takhar to defend Taloqan city against Taliban offensive attacks.

On July 2, 1997, the Taliban captured Taloqan, the Takhar provincial capital, for one day. General Noori and other Northern Alliances commanders retreated to Farkhar Valley, but on July 3, 1997, they returned along with other of Massoud's commanders and took back control of the city. General Noori was then assigned by Ahmad Shah Massoud as 4th zone commander, with his area of responsibility being the north of Taloqan, Nahr-e-Chaman and Namakab district, and at same time he was responsible for the command and control of the front line in Bangi, to defend the province against Taliban offensive attacks.

On August 8, 1998, the Taliban captured the northern opposition capital Mazar-i-Sharif, and on August 11, they captured Taloqan. General Noori retreated to the village of Mashtan in Farkhar District, in the border region of Badakhshan. He received a letter from Amir Khan Motaqi inviting him to join the Taliban, but he refused and continued to resist and after 9 days on August 17, 1998, during an offensive attack with his comrades, he retook the strategic districts of Warsaj and Farkhar, and took 230 Taliban fighters prisoners. As a reaction, the Taliban arrested hundreds of opposition members, mainly Tajiks including General Noori's younger brother Mohibullah Noori. On October 17, 1998, General Noori and other Northern Alliances commanders recaptured the previous Rabbani-stronghold of Taloqan city from the Taliban. In late 1998, a new force was established by Ahmad Shah Massoud called the "Central Force," and Gen Noori was assigned as a deputy commander. The forces later formed the Afghanistan National Army.

In September 1999, the Taliban stepped up their pressure on United Front positions in northern Afghanistan, including north of Kunduz city and to the east of Khanabad town in Takhar Province. The Taliban pushed through Bangi and threatened to take Taloqan, Commander Ahmad Shah Massoud's main command and control center. General Noori, as the commander responsible for the command and control of Bangi, had an important role in defending Taloqan city, and eventually the Taliban failed to capture the city.

In June 2000, the Taliban, reinforced by foreign fighters, conducted large attacks and besieged the city. The siege lasted more than a month, with 20,000 Taliban, Pakistani fighters and al-Qaeda terrorists involved. During the siege, General Noori was injured, and the city eventually fell to the Taliban. A United Front spokesman said to the AP, "Our fighters suffered several casualties during the fighting, but none when we were pulling out." Amnesty International reported on several abuses that took place during the fighting in Taloqan, the Taliban having bombarded a village, burned down homes, and killed civilians. The conflict leading up to the fall of Taloqan in September 2000 displaced 60,000 to 75,000 personnel.

The retreated United Front forces in Farkhar valley said through a spokesman to AP, "We pulled out of the city to avoid civilian casualties." General Noori transferred to Tajikistan for medical treatment, and returned to Farkhar valley. He was appointed as deputy commander of the northeastern front from 2000 until the September 11 attacks, at which point the USA entered Afghanistan. General Noori had been in command for two years of the northeastern forces.

== Police career ==
In October 2001, after the collapse of the Taliban regime, he was appointed to the 999 Brigade of Takhar Province, and served in the Afghan National Army until 2003.

In 2003, he joined the Afghan National Police, where he was appointed as chief of police in Badakhshan, where he worked to disarm illegal armed groups, and arrest drug smugglers. In an interview with IRIN News, he expressed concern about illegal armed groups and smugglers:"We need commandos, we need police, we need helicopters. Commanders [warlords] are strong. They must be brought under control." Shortly after, he was preparing for another operation to quell clashes between militia groups that had plagued the isolated province since early May.

From 2006 to 2010, he served as chief of police in Ghor Province.

In 2010, the Taliban tried to operate bases in the northern provinces of Afghanistan, especially Takhar, which caused deep concern to the Afghan government. During this time, the central government appointed General Noori as the chief of police of Takhar province. Shortly after taking office, he conducted recapture operations over two months in the districts of Khwaja Ghar, Chah Ab, Khwaja Ghar, Yangi Qala, Khwaja Bahawuddin, Darqad and Dashti Qala. During the operation, General Noori survived a Taliban ambush attack.

On May 28, 2011, General Noori died in a Taliban bomb attack which killed six people, including Police Chief of Northern Afghanistan and Commander of the 303 Pamir Corps General Mohammed Daud Daud and two German nationals, and injured Governor of Takhar province Abdul Jabbar Taqwa and commander of ISAF troops in North Afghanistan, General Markus Kneip.
