= Ab Bazan =

Ab Bazan Āb Bāzān
- Location in Afghanistan
- Coordinates: 36°56′N 69°57′E
- Country: Afghanistan
- Province: Takhar Province
- District: Rustaq District
- Time zone: UTC+4:30 (Afghanistan Standard Time)

Ab Bazan is a village located on the right side of the Kokcha River in Afghanistan. It is about 15 miles north of Kalafghan and about 20 miles northwest of Keshem. It is located in Rustaq District.

== See also ==
- Takhar Province
