= Takhar (disambiguation) =

Takhar is a god in the Serer religion.

Takhar may also refer to:

== Places ==
- Takhar, Punjab, a village in Jalandhar district of Punjab State, India
- Takhar Province, Afghanistan
  - Takhar University
- The likely historical basis of the Vedic Tushara Kingdom
- Tukhara, an alternate name for the historical Iranian region of Bactria

== People ==
- Bajrang Lal Takhar (born 1981), an Indian rower
- Harinder Takhar (born 1951), an Indian-Canadian politician
- Mandy Takhar, a British-Indian actor in Punjabi cinema

== See also ==
- Tocharian languages, extinct Indo-European languages of the Tarim Basin, China
- Tocharians, the Tocharian-speaking peoples of the Tarim
