= Urtatagai conflict =

Urtatagai conflict may refer to:

- Urtatagai conflict (1913)
- Urtatagai conflict (1925–1926)
