= Urta Tagay =

Island in Amu Darya river

Coordinates: 37°28′N 69°28′E

Urta Tagay (Russian: Урта-Тагай, romanized: Urta-Tagay, also Урта-Тугай Urta-Tugay) is an island in the middle of the river Panj (a source river of the Amu Darya) on the border of Afghanistan and Tajikistan in Central Asia. It lies between the towns Farkhor and Yangi Qala. It is administered by Darqad District, Takhar Province, Afghanistan. It was the subject of two border conflicts: one in 1913 and another in 1925.

In 1925, claiming that the main channel of the river had shifted to the south of the island, placing it in Soviet territory, Soviet troops occupied the island. Despite the diplomatic claim, it is believed the island was seized to prevent Uzbek rebels from crossing the river to attack the Soviets. Kabul protested the seizure, and the dispute was taken to a joint commission which decided in favour of Afghanistan. Afterwards, the island was returned.

== Sources ==
- J. Bruce Amstutz. Afghanistan: The First Five Years of Soviet Occupation. DIANE Publishing, 1994 ISBN 0-7881-1111-6, 978-0-7881-1111-2. Available here.
