= Zholia Parsi =

Afghan human rights activist (born 1982)

- ژولیا پارسی
- Born: 1982 (age 43–44); Kabul, Democratic Republic of Afghanistan
- Citizenship: Afghanistan
- Education: Takhar University
- Occupations: Teacher; Human rights activist
- Organization: Spontaneous Movement of Afghan Women
- Known for: Organising protests following the Taliban offensive
- Awards: Martin Ennals Award for Human Rights Defenders (2024)

Zholia Parsi (Persian: ژولیا پارسی; born c. 1982) is an Afghan human rights activist. She is known for organising 38 protests across Afghanistan for women's rights following the 2021 Taliban offensive, for which she was arbitrarily detained for three months in 2023.

== Biography ==
Parsi was born and raised in Kabul. During the Afghan Civil War between 1992 and 1996, Parsi and her family relocated to Takhar Province in northeastern Afghanistan. During the Islamic Emirate period between 1996 and 2001 when the Taliban was in power, Parsi was restricted from accessing education due to being a girl. Following the collapse of the Taliban regime following the United States invasion of Afghanistan, Parsi resumed her education, first in Takhar and later in Kabul.

Parsi studied Persian literature at Takhar University in Taloqan, where she subsequently qualified as a Persian language teacher. After working at a girls' school in Kunduz, Parsi moved to Kabul, where she worked for 14 years as a Persian teacher. She also worked for the republican government, serving as the executive manager of the Afghan High Peace Council which oversaw negotiations between the Afghan government and the Taliban.

In August 2021, the Taliban offensive occurred, which culminated with the collapse of the republic government and the re-establishment of the Islamic Emirate under Taliban control. Following the fall of Kabul, in which the Taliban recaptured Kabul, Parsi immediately lost her job as a teacher, while her daughters were prevented from continuing with their education. On 3 September 2021, Parsi organised her first protest against "gender apartheid", held at Fawara Aag in Kabul. Parsi subsequently began organising protests with other women, first in Kabul and subsequently in other cities and provinces throughout Afghanistan, and founded the Spontaneous Movement of Afghan Women (SMAW) with the goal of ending the restriction on women entering public places.

At some protests, women were verbally abused, intimidated, attacked and arrested by Taliban forces. As a result, SMAW began organising protests inside as well as online. In September 2023, Parsi was arrested near her home in Qala Fathullah in Kabul and forcibly detained alongside her son, who had been arrested earlier in the day in Koteh Sangi. Parsi was detained for three months in solitary confinement at Taliban District 40 Detention Centre, without access to her lawyer and family, and reported that she was tortured and mistreated.

Parsi and her son were both released from custody on 18 December 2023, though Parsi was confined to her home and was placed under Taliban surveillance. In March 2024, Parsi went into exile after obtaining a medical visa to enter Pakistan. She subsequently was granted asylum in Brazil. During her time with SMAW, Parsi organised 38 protests across Afghanistan; her final protest, held ten days before her arrest, was in support of Tamana Zaryab Paryani.

As of 2026, Parsi lives in Germany, as part of St. Petri Kirche's church asylum programme in Burg, near Magdeburg.

== Recognition ==
In 2024, Parsi was named as that year's laureate of the Martin Ennals Award, alongside Tajik human rights acitivst Machuchehr Kholiqnazarov. Parsi was recognised for her "exceptional courage" advocating for women's rights in Afghanistan. Due to visa issues, she was unable to attend the ceremony on 21 November 2024 in Geneva, Switzerland, and the award was accepted on her behalf by Philippe Curat, a human rights lawyer. Parsi was the ninth woman, and the first Afghan, to win the prize. Freedom Now praised Parsi, stating the award served as a reminder of the "ongoing struggle of Afghan women against their oppressors", and called on the international community to support Afghan women to reclaim their rights.
