= Keshem =

Keshem Kishim
- Location in Afghanistan
- Coordinates: 36°48′23″N 70°6′15″E
- Country: Afghanistan
- Province: Badakhshan Province
- District: Kishim
- Time zone: + 4.30

Keshem or Kishim is a town and seat of Kishim District in Badakhshan Province in north-eastern Afghanistan. It lies on the road from Taloqan to Faizabad.
