= Darqad District =

Darqad District درقد ولسوالۍ
- District
- Location of the district in Takhar Province
- Coordinates: 37.385°N 69.455°E
- Country: Afghanistan
- Province: Takhār Province
- Seat: Darqad

Area
  - Total: 393 km^{2} (152 sq mi)

Population (2015)
  - Total: 25,152
  - Density: 64/km^{2} (170/sq mi)
- Time zone: UTC+4:30 (Afghanistan Standard Time)
- Post code: 3758

Darqad District (Pashto: درقد ولسوالۍ) is a district of Takhar Province, Afghanistan. The district has 34 villages. Darqad did not change between the 325 and 398 district sets. Near the end of 2018, the district was considered to be Taliban-influenced, as opposed to the Afghan government. The district was Taliban-controlled by August 2021.

== History ==
The island of Urta Tagay, which makes up a sizeable chunk of the district's land area, was the site of two border conflicts: one in 1913 and one in 1925.

== Geography ==
Darqad has an area of 393 square kilometers, comparatively equivalent to the Isle of Wight. The district lies within the watershed of the Ab-i Rustaq River, a tributary of the Panj River. Darqad has 34 villages.

The district is bordered by Yangi Qala to the east, Khwaja Bahauddin to the southeast, Dashti Qala to the south, and Khatlon to the west and to the north. Khatlon is a Tajik province, with all other entities being districts in Takhar province. The Panj river separates Darqad from Tajikistan.

== Demographics ==
Darqad has a population of 25152, with a sex ratio of 26 males to 25 females. The median age is 14.9. 45.8% of the district's population is working, and of those that don't work, half of them are seeking work. The average household size is 6.7 people, meaning there are about 3,754 households in Darqad.

== Economy ==
There are some basic roads in the district, but there is a lack of a coordinated transportation system. Darqad has some natural mines and forests. There is some agricultural activity in the district, however the land sometimes is flooded by the Panj. There is a lack of improved seeds, fertilizer, and trained farmers.

There are valuable smuggling routes between Darqad and Tajikistan.

== Education and Healthcare ==
Darqad has some schools, with a few of them being religious schools. However, there is administrative corruption, a lack of funds, lack of equipment, lack of land, and lack of drinking water. Half of the population ages 15–24 can read.

The district has some basic health centers, with doctors and vaccination. Darqad lacks professional doctors, equipment, technology, and a hospital.
