= TQN =

TQN or tqn may refer to:

- TQN, the IATA code for Taloqan Airport, Takhar Province, Afghanistan
- TQN, the ICAO code for Taquan Air, Alaska, United States
- tqn, the ISO 639-3 code for Tenino language, United States
