= Kalafgan District =

- District
- Location of Kalafgan in Takhar Province
- Coordinates (the district center): 36.773°N 69.941°E
- Country: Afghanistan
- Province: Takhār Province
- Established: 1973
- District Center: Kalafgan

Government
  - Governor: Reza Shah Sarasengi

Area
  - Total: 479 km^{2} (185 sq mi)

Population (2019)
  - Total: 39,171
  - Density: 81.8/km^{2} (212/sq mi)

Ethnicity
  - Uzbek: 95%
  - Tajik: 2%
  - Hazara: 2%
  - Pashtun: 1%
- Time zone: UTC+4:30 (Afghanistan Standard Time)

Kalafgan District is a district of Takhar Province, Afghanistan. The district is well governed, with self-governance in parts of Kalafgan because of how remote they are. 42 villages are located in the district. In 2017, Kalafgan was considered to be under full control by the Afghan Government. However, the Taliban had taken full control by August 2021.

== Geography ==
Kalafgan has an area of 479 square kilometers, comparatively equivalent to the area of Cape Barren Island. The district has access to a good road, as it lies along the highway linking the provincial capitals of Taloqan and Fayzabad, Badakhshan. There are two rivers flowing through Kalafgan— one that flows from the southeast to the northwest that eventually joins the Kokcha River, and a smaller river that flows through the southeast portion of the district that flows to the Khanabad River.

Kalafgan is bordered by four other districts: Rustaq District to the north, Kishim District to the east, Farkhar District to the south, and Taluqan District to the west. Kishim is located in Badakhshan Province, with all other districts being located in Takhar Province. The Kokcha River forms the border between Rustaq and Kalafgan.

== History ==
The district was created as part of the first 325 district set in 1973, and was controlled by Mujahideen soon after the start of the Soviet–Afghan War. Kalafgan was initially controlled by Jamiat-e Islami but switched to Junbesh-i Melli during the 1990s. During the Afghan Civil War (1996–2001), only one village was controlled by the Taliban briefly in 2001. The Taliban had not been a strong presence in the (formerly) relatively peaceful district, with only two incidents from 2018 to May 2020. However, the district was taken by the Taliban by August 2021.

== Demographics ==
Kalafgan has a population of 39171, with a sex ratio of 101 males for every 100 females. Most of the district is made up of Uzbeks. The median age is 15.3, with about 50% of the population employed. There are about 5760 households in Kalafgan, with an average size of 6.8 people.
