= Farkhar District =

- District
- Location of Farkhar in Takhar Province
- Coordinates: 36.57°N 69.857°E
- Country: Afghanistan
- Province: Takhar

Government
  - Governor: Abdul Rashad Asfeia

Area
  - District: 1,214 km^{2} (469 sq mi)

Population (2019)
  - District: 52,117
  - Density: 42.93/km^{2} (111.2/sq mi)
  - Urban: 3,023
  - Rural: 49,094

Ethnicity
- Time zone: UTC+4:30 (AFT)
- Post code: 3752

Farkhar District is a district in Takhar Province of Afghanistan. It is located southeast of Taloqan. The Khanabad River flows inside this valley. Around 99% of the people in Farkhar speak Dari. Farkhar has about 50,000 people and 75 villages.

== Etymology ==
The name Farkhār is generally believed to be Sogdian (and possibly also Khwarazmian) βṛγʾr, the equivalent of the Sanskrit word vihāra (a Buddhist monastery), which it renders in translations of Buddhist texts. Another view is that it is not etymologically connected with vihāra but is a Persian word, originally *paru-khuvāthra "full of happiness".

Although Buddhism was eventually replaced by Islam in northern Afghanistan around the 8th century, as late as the 11th century the Khwarazmian scholar al-Biruni wrote of Buddhists: "their monuments, the bahārs of their idols and their farkhārs, are visible on the borders of Khorasan adjacent to India".

== Geography and climate ==
Farkhar has an area of 1,214 km^{2} (469 sq mi), comparatively equivalent to the area of South Andaman Island. The district has no major roadways. The Farkhar River is the main river of Farkhar, with other tributaries flowing into it.

Farkhar is surrounded by Kalafgan District to the north, Kishim District to the northeast, Tagab District to the east, Warsaj District to the south, Namak Ab District to the west, and Taluqan District to the northeast. Kishim is located in Badakhshan Province, with all other districts in Takhar Province.

=== Climate ===
Fakhar has a humid continental climate (Köppen Dsb).

Climate data for Farkhar
Month	Jan	Feb	Mar	Apr	May	Jun	Jul	Aug	Sep	Oct	Nov	Dec	Year
Mean daily maximum °C (°F)	−0.2 (31.6)	1.4 (34.5)	7.8 (46.0)	14.2 (57.6)	19.2 (66.6)	23.5 (74.3)	26.2 (79.2)	25.5 (77.9)	21.7 (71.1)	15.6 (60.1)	8.2 (46.8)	2.3 (36.1)	13.8 (56.8)
Mean daily minimum °C (°F)	−9.6 (14.7)	−8.0 (17.6)	−3.2 (26.2)	1.8 (35.2)	6.6 (43.9)	11.0 (51.8)	14.4 (57.9)	14.1 (57.4)	10.1 (50.2)	3.7 (38.7)	−3.3 (26.1)	−8.5 (16.7)	2.4 (36.4)
Average precipitation mm (inches)	63 (2.5)	78 (3.1)	111 (4.4)	160 (6.3)	147 (5.8)	45 (1.8)	10 (0.4)	3 (0.1)	7 (0.3)	39 (1.5)	58 (2.3)	49 (1.9)	770 (30.4)
Source: Climate-Data.org

== Demographics ==
Farkhar has a population of 52,117, with a sex ratio of 26 males for every 25 females. Ethnic Tajiks are the majority. The median age is 15.8 and about 42% of the population is working. About 18% of the unemployed are seeking work. There are about 8,000 households in the district, with an average size of 6.5 people.

== Villages ==
The villages of this district include and are not limited to: Shaktan, Shingan, Nahr Ab, Dasht e Robat, Abi Dara, Kurani, Pire Farkhar, Shori, Dehak, Jangle Gaza, Dasht e Konj, Chashma e Garmuk, Shahre Farkhar, Kundal, Mazre Shikh, Khanaqa, Khurmab, Ardishan, Kashan, Sare Kham, Singan, Pyani, Dahne Zure, Khafdara, Sang e Atash, Khawaki, Farhangurd, Khusdeh, Darbaho, Huti, Warook, Ghashob, Yookh, Lujdeh and Mashtan.

== In Persian poetry ==
In Persian poetry, the phrase بت فرخار bot-e Farxār "buddha of a temple" or "idol from Farkhar" became proverbial for a beautiful person. One of the earliest poets to use it was Manuchehri, an 11th-century poet at the court of Mas'ud I of Ghazni, who wrote:

هنگام بهارست و جهان چون بت فرخار
hengām-e bahār ast o jahān čun bot-e farxār
"It is springtime and the world is like a buddha of Farkhar"

In another example the poet Khwaju (or Khaju) (d. 1352), praising a handsome Turk, writes:

شیراز ترکستان شده کان بت ز فرخار آمده
Šīrāz Torkestān šode k'ān bot ze Farxār āmade
"Shiraz has become Turkistan since that "buddha" came from Farkhar"

== See also ==
- Districts of Afghanistan
