= Mashhad, Afghanistan =

Mashhad مشهد
- Location in Afghanistan
- Coordinates: 36°48′33″N 70°5′45″E
- Country: Afghanistan
- Province: Badakhshan Province
- District: Kishim
- Time zone: + 4.30

Mashhad (Dari: مشهد) is a village in Badakhshan Province in north-eastern Afghanistan.
