= Ulfatkhonim Mamadshoeva =

Tajikistani journalist

Ulfatkhonim Mamadshoeva (Tajik: Улфатхоним Мамадшоева; born c. 1957) is a Tajikistani journalist and human rights activist. A Pamiri from the autonomous Gorno-Badakhshan region of Tajikistan, Mamadshoeva worked as an independent journalist covering local issues. In May 2022, she was arrested and charged with organising protests in Khorog, the regional capital; in December, she received a 21-year prison sentence in a trial that has been criticised by the United Nations and Human Rights Watch, among others.

== Personal life ==
Mamadshoeva was born in Gorno-Badakhshan into a Pamiri family. For a time, she was married to Kholbash Kholbashov, a retired major general from the Tajik Border Troops, but they had separated by 2022. She has three children.

== Career ==
Mamadshoeva worked primarily as a freelance journalist for independent outlets in Gorno-Badakhshan, and more broadly in Tajikistan and Central Asia, including Fergana. Covering cultural, social and geopolitical issues, she primarily published under pseudonyms to avoid retaliation against her reporting. During the 1990s, Mamadshoeva has acted as a mediator during peace talks to end the Tajikistani Civil War.

In December 2021, Mamadshoeva launched Pamir Plus, a news website aimed to address the lack of independent media operating within Gorno-Badakhshan. She also established Nomus va Insof (Tajik: Номус ва Инсоф, lit. 'honour and justice'), a non-governmental organisation focusing on protecting and promoting the rights of women and children in Tajikistan.

=== 2022 Gorno-Badakhshan unrest and arrest ===
In May 2022, protests broke out across Gorno-Badakhshan following the killing of Gulbiddin Ziyobekov, a Pamiri man, on 25 November 2021. While security forces initially reported that Ziyobekov had been resisting arrest and killed during a shootout, subsequent footage identified weeks later suggested he had been arbitrarily executed. During the protests, it was reported that security forces killed an estimated 40 civilians. The Interior Ministry of Tajikistan subsequently stated that protesters had been attempting to "destabilise the social and political situation" in Gorno-Badakhshan.

On 17 May, the Interior Ministry released a statement accusing three Pamiri activists, including Mamadshoeva, of organising protests that had occurred in Khorog. In an interview with Fergana published the same day, Mamadshoeva described the accusations against her as "absurd" and stated that she had not organised protests that had occurred in Khorog or Rushon.

On 18 May, Mamadshoeva was arrested at her home in Dushanbe; on the same day, her former husband, as well as Khushruz Jumayev, a journalist for Pamir Plus, were also arrested and accused of organising Pamiris to take part in mass protests. They were charged with publicly calling for the violent change of Tajikistan's constitutional order; organising a criminal group; murder; attempted murder; and terrorism.

On 24 May, the state-owned Tojikiston television channel broadcast a documentary, Failure of the Conspiracy (Tajik: Шикасти Фитна, romanized: Shikasti Fitna), which featured interviews with Mamadshoeva and Kholbashov in which they admitted to having organised protests in Khorog. In addition, footage was broadcast of Mamadshoeva meeting with officials from the United States embassy; an embassy spokesperson subsequently stated that the implication that the United States had been involved in the protests were "absolutely false" and accused the documentary of "mischaracterising" their meeting with Mamadshoeva.

=== Trial and response ===
The trials for Mamadshoeva, Kholbashov and Jumayev, as well as other Pamiri activists, including Mamadshoeva's brother, Khursand Mamadshoev, started on 3 August 2022 at the State Committee for National Security's detention centre in Dushanbe. After being officially declared as "secret" by the government, the trials occurred behind closed doors. During her trial, Mamadshoeva alleged that her confession had been made under duress.

In September 2022, Kholbashov was sentenced to life imprisonment; Jumayev to eight years in prison; and Mamadshoev to 18 years.

In December 2022, the Supreme Court of Tajikistan sentenced Mamadshoeva to 21 years in prison, alongside fellow activist Manuchehr Kholiqnazarov, who received a 15-year sentence. Mamadshoeva was ordered to serve her sentence at Correctional Facility YaS3/8 in Norak.

The Coalition For Women In Journalism called for Mamadshoeva's immediate release, while Human Rights Watch criticised the trial of Mamadshoeva and other activists as being unfair, citing them occurring in secret, without giving the activists access to legal advice and the evidence being used against them.

In July 2023, the United Nations Human Rights Council expressed concern about the trials afforded to Mamadshoeva and others, and suggested that the Tajikistani government was using anti-terrorism legislation to "silence" critical voices.
