= Taloqan Airport =

Airport in Taloqan, Takhar, Afghanistan

- IATA: TQN; ICAO: OATQ

Summary
- Airport type: Public/Military
- Owner: Afghanistan
- Operator: Afghan National Security Forces (ANSF); ISAF
- Serves: Taloqan, Takhar Province
- Location: Taloqan, Afghanistan
- Elevation AMSL: 2,606 ft / 794 m
- Coordinates: 36°46′14.5″N 69°31′56.7″E

Map
- Location of airport in Afghanistan

Runways
Direction	Length		Surface
Direction	m	ft	Surface
	2,000	6,562
- Source: Landings.com

Taloqan Airport (IATA: TQN, ICAO: OATQ) is an airport serving the city of Taloqan (also known as Taluqan) in Takhar Province, Afghanistan.

== Gallery ==
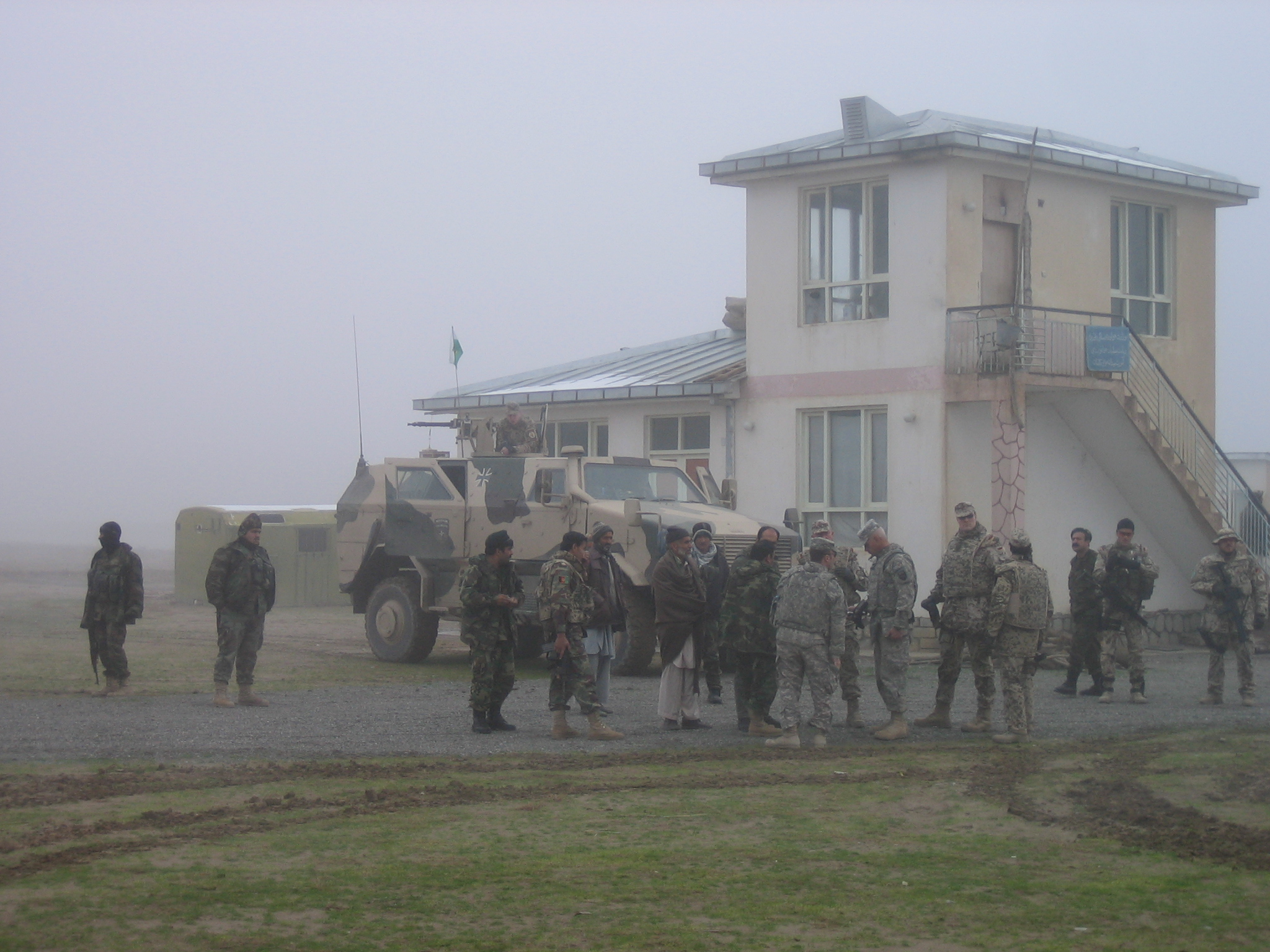
Taloqan Airport 2009

== See also ==
- List of airports in Afghanistan
