= Manuchehr Kholiqnazarov =

Tajik human rights activist

Manuchehr Kholiqnazarov (Tajik: Манучеҳр Холиқназаров; Russian: Манучехр Холикназаров), sometimes spelled Manuchehr Kholiknazarov, is a Pamiri human rights activist and lawyer from Gorno-Badakhshan, an autonomous region of Tajikistan. His 2022 arrest and conviction following peaceful protests in Khorog led to international condemnation from human rights organisations.

== Career ==
Kholiqnazarov is a trained lawyer who served as the director of the Lawyers Association of Pamir until his arrest in 2022, which advocated for the protect of the human rights of the Pamiri ethnic group native to Gorno-Badakhshan. He is also a member of the Civil Society Coalition against Torture and Impunity in Tajikistan.

== Activism ==
On 25 November 2021, Gulbuddin Ziyobekov, a 29-year-old Pamiri man, was killed by Tajik security forces during an operation in Tavdem, a village in the Roshtqal'a District of Gorno-Badakhshan. While authorities reported that Ziyobekov had resisted arrest and had been killed during a shootout, witness accounts and mobile phone footage suggested he had been arbitrarily executed. Four days after Ziyobekov's death, and following protests in the region's capital, Khorog, Kholiqnazarov became a founding member of Commission 44, an organisation set up to investigate Ziyobekov's killing.

== Arrest and imprisonment ==
On 28 May 2022 Kholiqnazarov was arrested and charged with "participation in a criminal organisation" and "participating in the activities of a banned organisation due to its extremist activities" under articles 187 and 307 of the Criminal Code of Tajikistan. On 6 June 2022, he was transferred to the detention centre of the State Committee for National Security in Dushanbe.

On 21 October 2022 Mary Lawlor, the United Nations special rapporteur on the situation of human rights defenders issued a statement during a visit to Tajikistan, expressing concerns about the ongoing detention of Kholiqnazarov and other Commission 44 members.

On 9 December 2022, the Supreme Court of Tajikistan found Kholiqnazarov guilty and sentenced him to 16 years imprisonment, alongside Ulfatkhonim Mamadshoeva, who received a 21-year sentence; Kholiqnazarov disputed the accusations and had pleaded not guilty. The trial was criticised for not giving Kholiqnazarov and other defendants access to lawyers or sight of the evidence being used against them.

=== International response ===
A joint statement was published calling for Kholiqnazarov's immediate and unconditional release, signed by Human Rights Watch; the International Partnership for Human Rights; the World Organisation Against Torture; the Helsinki Foundation for Human Rights; the Norwegian Helsinki Committee; Front Line Defenders; the International Federation for Human Rights; and Freedom Now.

Syinat Sultanalieva of Human Rights Watch called Kholiqnazarov's sentence a "direct retaliation" for his work as a human rights activist. Brigitte Dufour of the International Partnership for Human Rights called Kholiqnazarov an "outstsanding defender of human rights and a fighter against injustice". Gerald Staberok of the World Organisation Against Torture described the sentence as "arbitrary" and called on his immediate release.

In 2024, Kholiqnazarov was named as one of two laureates of that year's Martin Ennals Award for Human Rights Defenders, alongside Afghan activist Zholia Parsi.
