= Yangi Qala District =

- District
- Location of the district in Takhar Province
- Coordinates: 37.47°N 69.62°E
- Country: Afghanistan
- Province: Takhār Province

Area
  - Total: 247 km^{2} (95 sq mi)

Population (2015)
  - Total: 23,959
  - Density: 97/km^{2} (250/sq mi)
- Time zone: UTC+4:30 (Afghanistan Standard Time)
- Post Code: 3766

Yangi Qala District is a district in Takhar Province, Afghanistan. Economically the population of this district is primarily involved in agriculture. The main crops are rice and wheat, and the surplus rice is exporting to neighboring districts and provinces. There are 64 villages in the district. As of August 2021, the Taliban has full control over this district.

The district is made up of several different ethnic groups.

== Geography ==
Yangi Qala has an area of 247 square kilometers, comparatively equivalent to Malta. The district lies within the watershed of the Ab-i Rustaq River, a tributary of the Panj River. There is a primary road going from the district center to the Khwaja Bahauddin District center, continuing to the Dashti Qala District center and ending by the district center in Khwaja Ghar District.

The district borders Chah Ab District to the east, Rustaq District to the southeast, Khwaja Bahauddin District to the southwest, Darqad District to the west, and Khatlon to the north. All bordering districts are located in Takhar province, Afghanistan except for Khatlon, which is a Tajik province. The Panj River separates Yangi Qala from Tajikistan.

== History ==
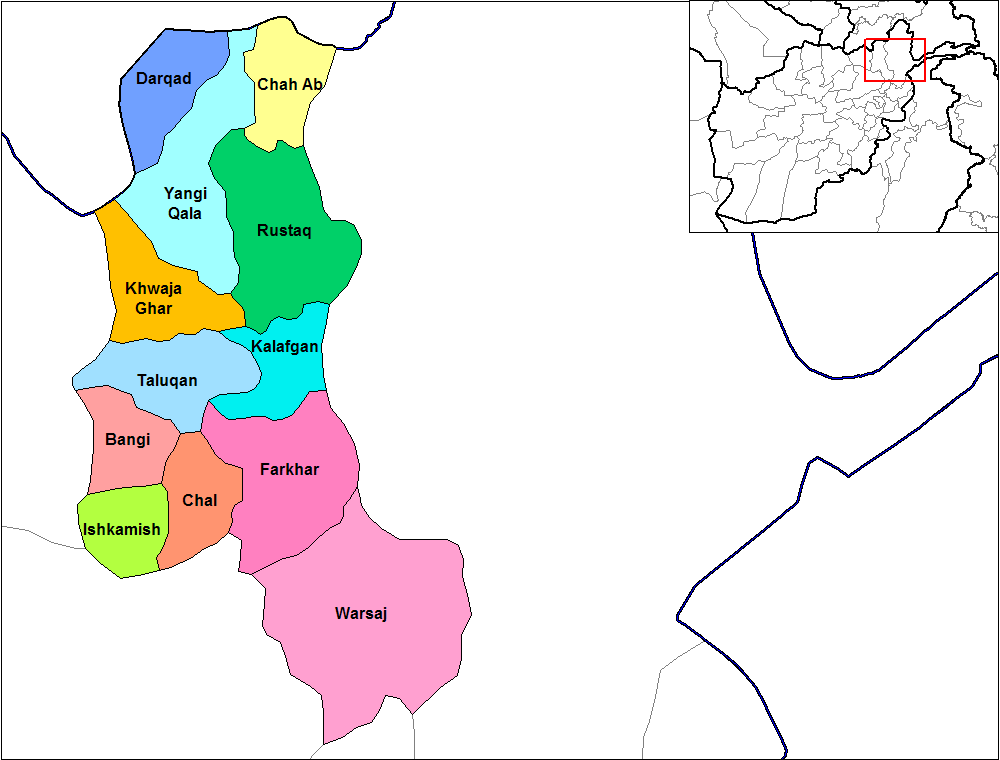
Old map of Takhar

Amanullah Khan, in the 1920s, tried to colonize the area with non-native groups. Pashto-speakers arrived in the area and clashed with the native Uzbeks and Tajiks.

The district has formally existed since 1973 when Mohammed Ashraf plotted a map of 325 Afghan Districts. That set expanded to 329 by 1998, and Yangi Qala went unchanged. However, in 2005, Khwaja Bahuddin was split from this district and Yangi Qala shrank.

=== Fighting ===
The first time that the Taliban were seen in the district was around 2009 and there have been clashes between Anti-government groups (including the Taliban) and the Government of Afghanistan.

In August 2010, anti-government forces established a checkpoint and captured one soldier and one policeperson. Then in October, a NATO operation killed the Taliban district leader. Three years later on 8 February 2013, ISAF captured an IMU leader who was assisting in planning a high-profile attack. Later in 2015, the Taliban claimed to have taken the district, but officials said that was untrue.

There was a clearing operation in the district in February 2017 that pushed the Taliban out of the district. One month later, the Taliban claimed to have 15% control over the district. The following May, the Taliban controlled almost half the districts and held a police checkpoint for more than a day. Around this time, the decision was made to move the district offices to the provincial capital due to security concerns. Later in September an attack on the district center was repulsed. At the end of the year, the BBC classified Yangi Qala as having low Taliban presence, defined as being attacked about once every three months.

On 6 February 2018, the Afghanistan Air Force raided Taliban strongholds in the district and killed 12 insurgents, and another raid in May killed another 6 militants. In October, Takhar officials said that the Taliban controlled half the district. Around that same time, the Taliban attacked security outposts in the district.

The Taliban took an outpost in Kaftar Ali village after two hours of fighting on 2 April 2019. There was another attack on an outpost 32 days later. Later in July, an illegal armed commander occupied a few villages in the district and disrupted activity. There was another security post attack during that same month. On 3 September, a pro-government militia was ambushed and 11 people were killed. On September 10, 2019, the district was taken the Taliban. 3 days later, the district was of militants cleared in an operation.

The Taliban controlled the district by August 2021.

== Demographics ==
The district has a population of 23.960, and half the population are males and the other half are females. The median age is 16.5 and 43.2% of people work in the district. 43.8% of those were seeking work but couldn't find any. The average household is 6.7 people, meaning there are about 3576 households in the district.

== Economy ==
More people work in agriculture than any other industry in Yangi Qala. However, the farming technologies that the farmers have are not sufficient and there is a lack of irrigation systems. There are rug and carpet weaving centers in the district. The district doesn't have a proper center of trade. Yangi Qala has one gold mine.

The district exports heroin to Tajikistan.

== Healthcare and Education ==
Yangi Qala had about a 45% literacy rate for people ages 15–24 in 2015. The district has some limited schooling opportunities including Madrasas, but the schools lack funds, staff, buildings, and supplies- leading to a low literacy rate. In addition, the district lacks a university.

There is some access to healthcare with three medical centers located in the district, however mortality rates remain high because of a lack of trained doctors, a district hospital, and safe drinking water.
