= Rustaq District, Afghanistan =

Rustaq District
- District
- Location of the district in Takhar Province
- Coordinates: 37°08′30″N 69°48′16″E
- Country: Afghanistan
- Province: Takhār Province

Area
  - Total: 1,915 km^{2} (739 sq mi)

Population (2015)
  - Total: 199,160
  - Density: 104/km^{2} (270/sq mi)

Ethnicity
  - Tajik: 75%
  - Uzbek: 20%
  - Baloch: 10%
- Time zone: UTC+4:30 (Afghanistan Standard Time)
- Post code: 3754

Rustaq District is a district of Takhar Province, northern Afghanistan. The district centre is the town of Rostaq.

== Geography ==
Rustaq has an area of 1915 square kilometers, comparatively equivalent to Maui. The Rustaq River, or the Ab-i Rustaq, runs through the district, emptying into the Panj River. Some streams run to the Kokcha River.

=== Location ===
This district borders 12 other districts. Going clockwise from the north, they are Chah Ab District, Shahri Buzurg District, Argo District, Tishkan District, Kishim District, Kalafgan District, Taluqan District, Hazar Sumuch District, Khwaja Ghar District, Dashti Qala District, Khwaja Bahauddin District, and finally Yangi Qala District. Shahri Buzurg, Argo, Tishkan, and Kishim districts are all located in Badakhshan Province, with all other districts Rustaq borders in Takhar province. Taluqan District holds the provincial capital, Taloqan.

== Demographics ==
Rustaq has 102 males for every 100 females or 2% more males than females. The median age is 16.1 years old, and the average household size is 6.5 persons, meaning there are about 30,000 households in the district.

Most of the population lives next to the Rustaq River.

== Economy ==
The majority of district residents are engaged in agricultural activity, with wheat, corn, sugarcane, and chickpeas being the main crops. Both men and women work in this area. However, there is low agricultural output, because of a lack of tools, skill, and cold storehouses. In addition, armed groups cut and utilize resources illegally.

Weaving, tailoring, jungles, and mines are also important economic activities in Rustaq. However, lack of training, lack of management in the exploitation of resources, and lack of international selling for handicrafts are all major problems in these sectors.

Rustaq has about a 55% unemployment rate, with males being 8 times more likely to be working as females. Approximately 8% of the district's population are migrants.

== Education and Healthcare ==
Rustaq has 47 schools with access to primary, secondary, literacy courses, and high schools for boys and girls. However, there are shortages of buildings, materials, and money. About a third of residents ages 15–24 can read. 89% of the district has had no schooling, with more males being schooled than females.

The district also has 6 clinics with doctors, nurses, and midwives. However, there is a lack of trained doctors and medical drugs.
