= Chah Ab District =

- District
- Location of the district in Takhar Province
- Coordinates: 37.395°N 69.816°E
- Country: Afghanistan
- Province: Takhār Province

Area
  - Total: 764 km^{2} (295 sq mi)

Population (2015)
  - Total: 87,860
  - Density: 115/km^{2} (300/sq mi)
- Time zone: UTC+4:30 (Afghanistan Standard Time)
- Post code: 3755

Chah Ab District (Persian: ولسوالی چاه آب) is an important strategic district of Takhar Province, Afghanistan, situated along the Panj River at the border with Tajikistan.

While its economy is traditionally rooted in agriculture and livestock, Chah Ab is historically renowned as a major center for gold mining and traditional jewelry craftsmanship called zargari.

The majority of Chah Ab's residents are ethnic Tajiks, locally referred to as Chahabi and who speak a conservative Tajik dialect of Persian language closely related to that of Kulyab across the Panj River and Badakhshan.

The name Chah Ab (Persian: چاه‌ آب) is of Persian origin, derived from chah (“well”) and ab (“water”). The toponym literally means “water well” and refers to a settlement established around a natural water source or well.

== Geography ==
The geography of Chah Ab is characterized by a combination of mountains, hills, plains, and river valleys. Much of the district consists of rugged uplands and rolling hill terrain connected to the Badakhshan mountain system. Several mountain ridges and smaller hills surround the region, particularly to the southeast and northeast.

The climate is relatively cold compared to other parts of Takhar, with significant snowfall during winter. Harsh terrain and seasonal weather historically limited transportation and communication between villages.

Chah Ab borders the Amu Darya River to the north, while its eastern and western boundaries extend toward pasturelands, valleys, and historic settlements connected with Badakhshan and neighboring districts.

Villages and Settlements of Chah Ab

• Khayban — خیبان

• Keyshan / Keshan — کیشان

• Chargaz — چارگاز

• Sandanegan — صندنه‌گان

• Shardara — شادره

• Warentwa — ورنتوا

• Dara Zang — دره زنگ

• Nakra — نکره

• Ab Tang — آب‌تنگ

• Cheshma Khurshid — چشمه خورشید

• Gulabad — گل‌آباد

• Qaymasan — قیماسن

• Aznik — ازنیک

• Rabat Hamdin — رباط همدین

• Kulan — کولان

• Nuzab — نوزاب

• Gazan — گزان

• Kalanak — کلانک

• Argak — ارگک

• Abchin — آبچین

• Cheshma Gul — چشمه‌گل

• Kushk Awa — کوشک‌آوا

• Pashan — پاشان

• Sharshar — شرشر

• Shurkhuni — شورخونی

• Zanban — زنبان

• Takhnabad— تخن آباد

• Posht-e Bahar — پشت بهار

• Parkham — پرخم

• Espikho — اسپیخو

Chah Ab has an area of 764 kilometers, comparatively equivalent to Dominica. There are 63 villages within this district.

=== Location ===
Chah Ab is located in the northeast corner of Takhar province, and borders Shahri Buzurg to the east, Rustaq to the south, Yangi Qala to the west, and Khatlon to the north. Shahri Buzurg is located in Badakhshan Province. Khatlon is a province, located in Tajikistan. The border between Chah Ab and Khatlon is the Panj river.

== Demographics ==
87860 people live in the district as of 2015. The district has 99 males for every 100 females, and the median age is 16.2. 40.3% of the population was employed in 2015, however 5% of those people were seeking work. The average household size is 6.5 people.

== Economy ==
Farming and livestock are the main economic activities of the area. The main agricultural crops grown are wheat, barley, flax, chickpea and sesame. Agricultural output is low because of a lack of new farming technologies and skilled workers.

Chah Ab is rich with mines and natural resources, and one material mined is gold. However, they are largely unregulated. In addition, the forests are being cut down for light and fuel due to a lack of electricity.

== Education and health ==
Only about a third of the population ages 15–24 could read in 2015, and under 10% in 2006. Education has poor quality, with a shortage of money, staff, supplies, and building space. Some people object to sending girls to school due to traditional sentiments.

There is only one health clinic in the district as of 2006, and it cannot serve everyone that needs health care. This causes a high mortality rate.
