= Takhar University =

University in Afghanistan

- Dari: پوهنتون تخار; Pashto: د تخار پوهنتون
- Former names: Abdullah Ibn Massoud University
- Type: Government
- Established: 1955
- Vice-Chancellor: Associate Prof. Saduddin Saidi
- Rector: Assistant Prof. Khairuddin Khairkhah
- Location: Taloqan, Takhar Province, Afghanistan; 36.73118°N 69.539967°E

Takhar University (Dari: پوهنتون تخار ، Pashto: د تخار پوهنتون ) is a university in Taloqan, Takhar Province, Afghanistan. It was established by former president Burhanuddin Rabbani in 1991 in Peshawar, Pakistan under the name of "Abdullah Ibn Massoud University", and it was transferred to Taloqan in 1993. By 1994 it was registered by the Ministry of Higher Education and in the same year it started its academic activities, establishing two faculties (law and agriculture).

== Divisions ==
- Agriculture Faculty
- Education Faculty
- Engineering Faculty
- Languages and Literature Faculty
- Medicine Faculty
- Theology Faculty

== Notable alumni ==
- Zholia Parsi, human rights activist.
