= Takhar, Punjab =

Taklu
- Village
- Location in Punjab, India Taklu (India)
- Coordinates: 31.1557047°N 75.7560601°E
- Country: India
- State: Punjab
- District: Jalandhar

Government
  - Type: Panchayat raj
  - Body: Gram panchayat
- Elevation: 240 m (790 ft)

Population (2011)
  - Total: 757
- Sex ratio 389/368 ♂/♀

Languages
  - Official: Punjabi
- Time zone: UTC+5:30 (IST)
- PIN: 144409
- ISO 3166 code: IN-PB
- Vehicle registration: PB- 08
- Website: jalandhar.nic.in

Taklu is a village in Jalandhar district of Punjab State, India. It is located 8 km from Phagwara, 19.8 km from Phillaur, 30.3 km from district headquarter Jalandhar and 133 km from state capital Chandigarh. The village is administrated by a sarpanch who is an elected representative of village as per Panchayati raj (India).

== Demography ==
As of 2011, the village has a total number of 162 houses and a population of 757 of which include 389 are males while 368 are females according to the report published by Census India in 2011. The literacy rate of the village is 81.64%, higher than state average of 75.84%. The population of children under the age of 6 years is 76 which is 10.04% of total population of the village, and child sex ratio is approximately 520 lower than the state average of 846.

Most of the people are from Schedule Caste which constitutes 56.94% of total population in the village. The town does not have any Schedule Tribe population so far.

As per census 2011, 219 people were engaged in work activities out of the total population of the village which includes 187 males and 32 females. According to census survey report 2011, 89.50% workers describe their work as main work and 10.50% workers are involved in marginal activity providing livelihood for less than 6 months.

== Transport ==
Mauli railway station is the nearest train station; however, Phagwara Junction train station is 8.5 km away from the village. The village is 47 km away from domestic airport in Ludhiana and the nearest international airport is located in Chandigarh also Sri Guru Ram Dass Jee International Airport is the second nearest airport which is 121 km away in Amritsar.
