= Urtatagai conflict (1925–1926) =

Border conflict between Afghanistan and the Soviet Union

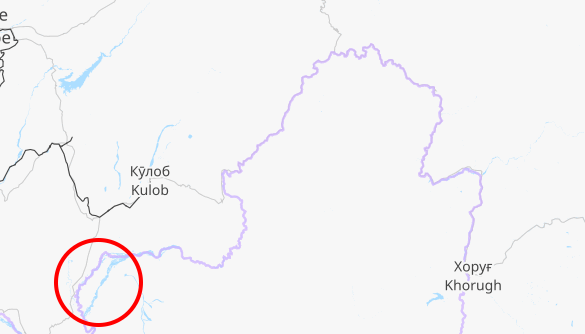
- Map of Afghanistan's northeastern border. Urtatagai is highlighted by a red circle.
Date	27 November 1925 – 15 August 1926
Location	Urta Tagay
Result	Afghan victory: The Soviet Union recognizes Urtatagai as Afghan territory; Afghanistan forced to restrain Basmachi border raids

Belligerents
Soviet Union	Emirate of Afghanistan (1925–1926); Kingdom of Afghanistan (1926)

Commanders and leaders
Joseph Stalin	Amanullah Khan

Strength
340 Uzbek émigrés	200 infantry 100 cavalry

Casualties and losses
12 killed	12 killed 5 captured

The Urtatagai conflict was a conflict between the Soviet Union and the Emirate of Afghanistan in the mid-1920s over the control of the island of Urta Tagay, which is an island on the Amu Darya river that had been claimed by Afghanistan since 1900, although it was under Russian control until 1920, when remnants of the Imperial Russian Army evacuated the island to aid the White movement in the Russian Civil War.

The Afghan Army had earlier unsuccessfully tried to enforce its claim on Urtatagai in a border conflict in 1913, and in 1920 Afghan forces were finally able to capture the island unopposed. On 27 November 1925, due to repeated incursions into Soviet territory by Basmachi rebels using the island as a base, as well as the Soviet claim to the Island, 340 Uzbek émigrés, supported by Moscow, landed on the island of Urtatagai on 27 November. Fighting began after the Uzbeks attempted to disarm an Afghan post, which saw 12 people killed on both sides and 5 Afghans taken prisoner. On 1 December the Uzbeks were driven back, while behind them the regular Red Army crossed the river and occupied Urtatagai.

On 18 December, Afghan Foreign Minister M. Tarzi issued a letter of protest, making four demands:

- That the Soviets abandon the island
- That prisoners of war be returned
- That Afghan losses be recovered
- That official apologies be rendered

On 19 December, after the Soviets failed to answer the letter, the Afghan Government began to deploy troops towards the North. To the surprise of the Soviet leadership, Western press took interest in the conflict and supported the Afghan government.

With potential war looming, the Soviet leadership decided to let a joint commission decide Urtatagai's fate, which ruled in favour of Afghanistan. On 28 February 1926, the Soviets transferred the island to Afghanistan in a ceremony. Negotiations regarding official Soviet recognition ensued for the following months, and after the Afghan government agreed to restrain Basmachi border raids, the Soviet government officially recognized Urtatagai as part of the Afghan state on 15 August 1926.
