= Khwaja Ghar District =

- District
- Location of the district in Takhar Province
- Coordinates: 37.06°N 69.42°E
- Country: Afghanistan
- Province: Takhār Province
- Plotted: 1973
- District Center: Khwaja Ghar

Government
  - Governor: Mohammad Omar (Note: No relation to the former leader of the Taliban, Mohammed Omar.)
  - Police Chief: Mohammad Ishaq

Area
  - District: 402 km^{2} (155 sq mi)

Population (2019)
  - District: 74,769
  - Density: 186/km^{2} (480/sq mi)
  - Urban: 7,917
  - Rural: 66,852

Ethnicity
  - Uzbek: 70%
  - Pashtun: 20%
  - Tajik: 10%
  - Hazara: <1%
- Time zone: UTC+4:30 (Afghanistan Standard Time)
- Post code: 3760

Khwaja Ghar District is a district of Takhar Province, Afghanistan. The district was badly destroyed during the 1996-2001 Afghan Civil War in fighting between the Taliban and the Northern Alliance.

== Geography ==
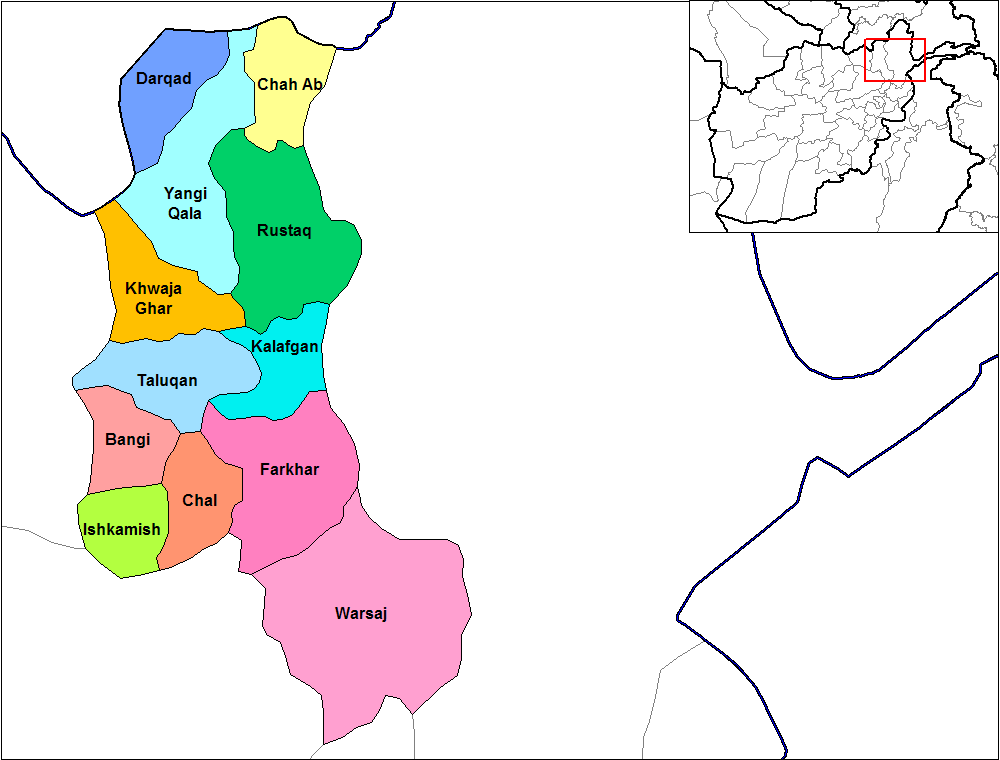
Pre-2005 Map of Takhar Province

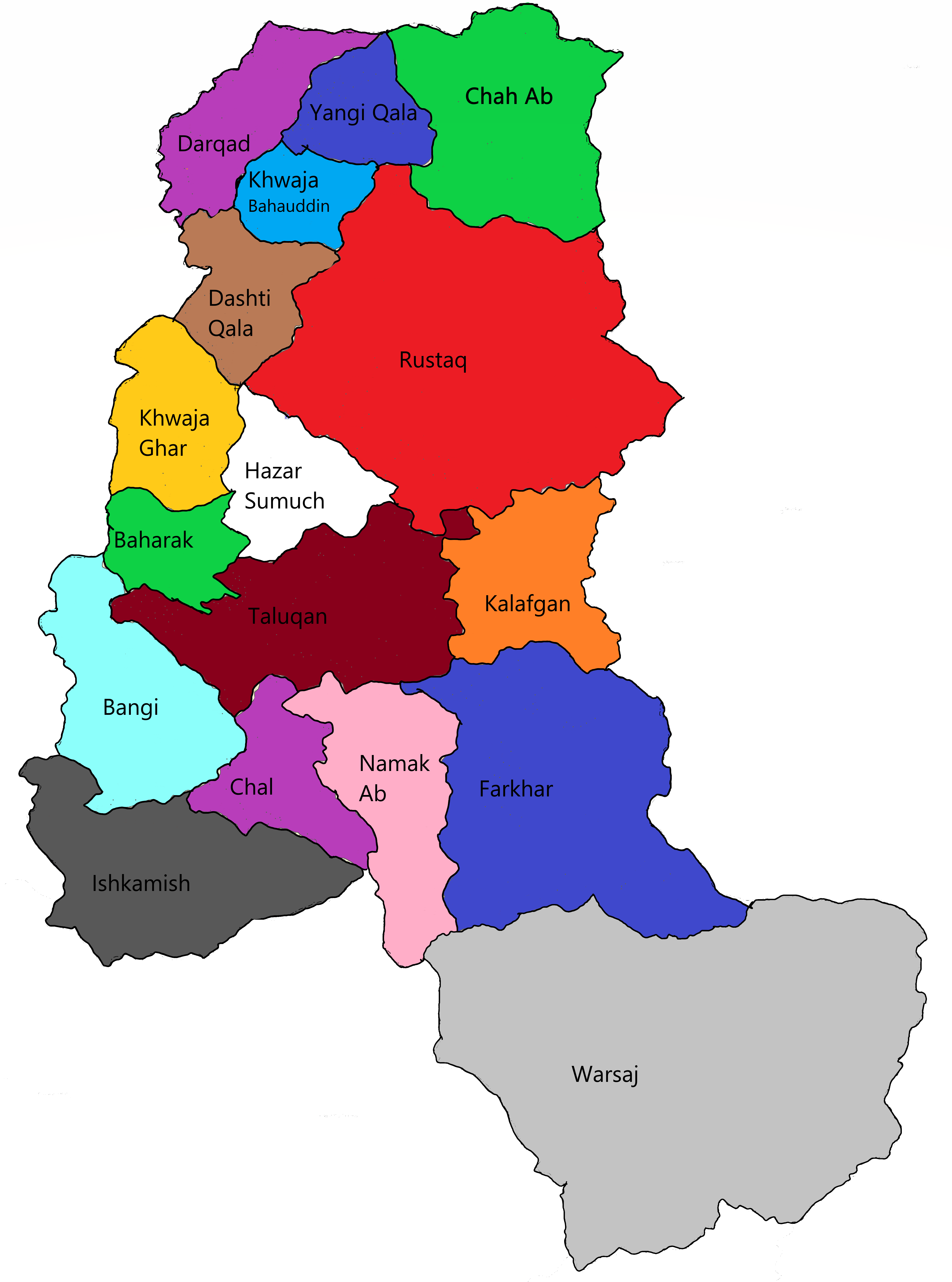
Post-2005 Map of Takhar Province

Khwaja Ghar has an area of 402 square kilometers, comparatively equivalent to the area of the Isle of Wight. There are main roads connecting the district with Dasht-i-Archi, and Taloqan, the provincial capital, but they are mined. There is a smaller road connecting Khwaja Ghar with Dashti Qala District. Khwaja Ghar is located within the watershed of the Kokcha River and the Amu Darya River.

Khwaja Ghar is bordered by Dashti Qala and Rustaq District to the northeast, Hazar Sumuch District to the east, Baharak District to the south, Dashte Archi to the west, and Khatlon to the north. Khatlon is a province located in Tajikistan, and Dashte Archi is located in Kunduz Province. All other districts it borders are located in Takhar Province.

== History ==
Khwaja Ghar was first mapped by Mohammed Ashraf in 1973 to prepare for a census.

Later, in 2001, the Taliban captured Khwaja Ghar in Early 2001, and held it until November of that year. The fighting was the heaviest in 20 years and destroyed much of the district.

In 2005, Dashti Qala District was created from part of Khwaja Ghar. Mohammad Omar became district governor in 2006.

The Taliban started challenging the government for control of Khwaja Ghar in early 2010, receiving support from insurgents in Dashte Archi District. In late 2010, much of the district was contested, Taliban controlled, or self governed.

In August 2006, the Taliban took control of the district center for a short period of time before being pushed back by security forces. Civilians said that the locals were harassed while they were in the district center. The Taliban claimed that they controlled 20% of Khwaja Ghar in March 2017. 10 villages were later taken by the Taliban in June of that year. There have been many incidents in Khwaja Ghar since then. (Note: See here for specific instances) At the end of 2018, the district was considered to be insurgent influenced.

== Demographics ==
The district has a population of 74769 and a sex ratio of 21 males for every 20 females. Khwaja Ghar has an Uzbek majority with Pashtun and Tajik minorities. The median age is 16.4 and about 40% of the population is working. 10% of the unemployed are seeking a job. The district is home to about 10,500 households, with an average size of 7.1 people.

There are 62 villages located in this district.

== Economy ==
40% of employed people work in agriculture, hunting, fishing, or foresting- making it is the biggest sector in Khwaja Ghar. The main crops are wheat, barley, cotton, and flax. There are about 14,000 hectares of irrigated land and 32,000 hectares of rain-fed land, but not all of the land is used. Irrigation is provided by the Taloqan River, but the water level is low by the time it reaches Khwaja Ghar. Agricultural output is low due to lack of seeds, training, modern farming methods, equipment, and cold storage houses. Livestock is also raised in the district, with mostly sheep and goats being raised.

Another 30% of the workforce works in the service sector. The majority of women work in weaving and tailoring.

The district bazaar is one of the largest in the northeast, probably because of its proximity to Tajikistan. Khwaja Ghar benefits from cross-border trade, both legal and illegal.

== Education and Healthcare ==
Khwaja Ghar has a 50% literacy rate for people ages 15–24. There are 5 secondary schools, 7 primary schools, and a religious school, with around 150 teachers. However, the schools are badly equipped and are in need of funds, teachers, buildings, and transportation.

The district has 3 health clinics and 9 pharmacies. Khwaja Ghar suffers from a lack of drinking water, doctors, and professional midwives. On 1 March 2020, one clinic was closed.
