= Khwaja Bahauddin District =

- District
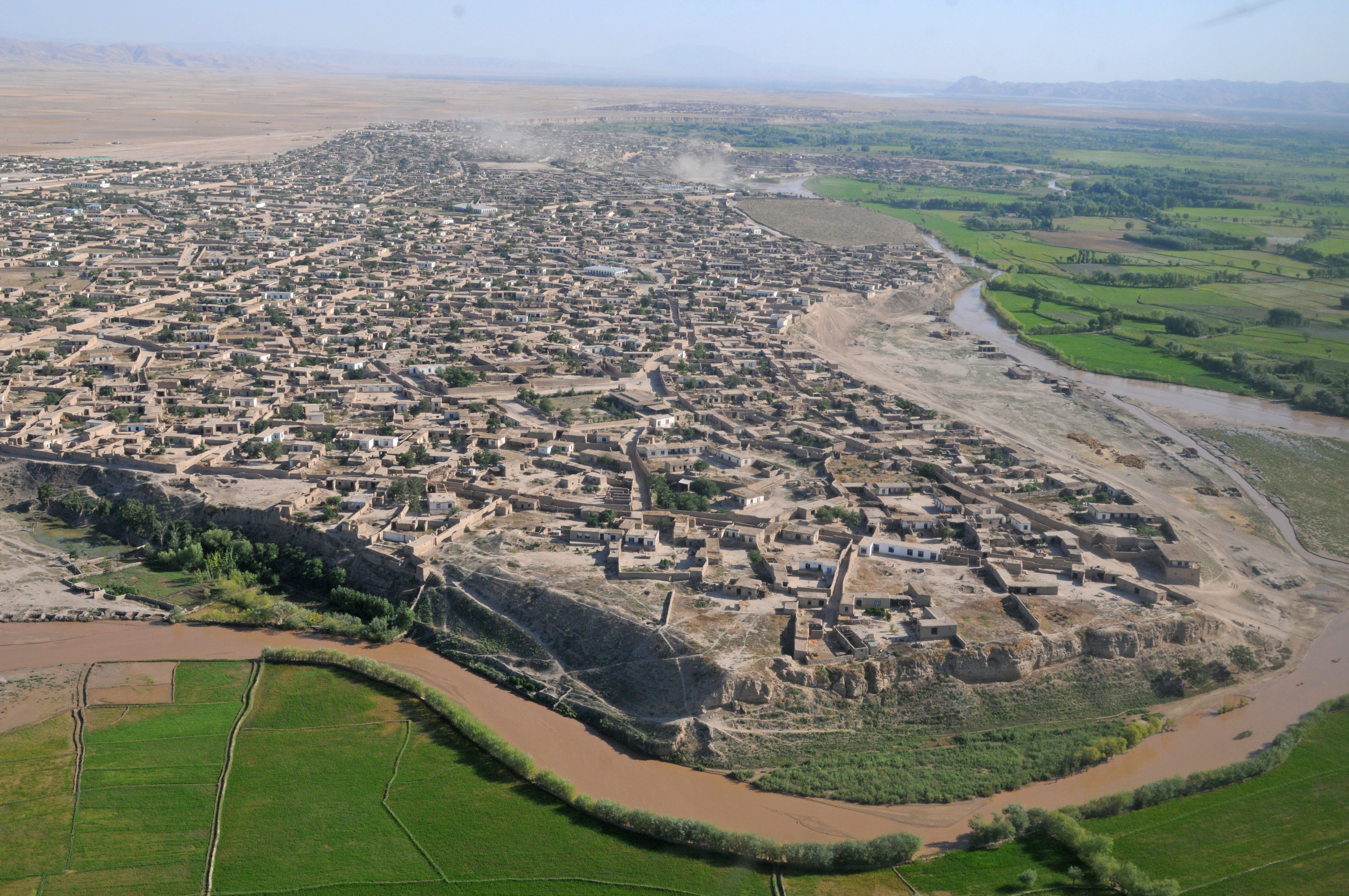
- View of Khwaja Bahauddin's urban center

- Location of Khwaja Bahauddin in Takhar Province
- Coordinates: 37.34°N 69.54°E
- Country: Afghanistan
- Province: Takhār Province

Area
  - Total: 178.2 km^{2} (68.8 sq mi)

Population (2019)
  - Total: 25,852
  - Density: 145/km^{2} (380/sq mi)
- Time zone: UTC+4:30 (Afghanistan Standard Time)
- Post code: 3757

Khwaja Bahauddin District is a district of Takhar Province, Afghanistan. The district was created from a portion of Yangi Qala District in 2005. 25 villages are located in Khwaja Bahauddin.

== Geography ==
Khwaja Bahauddin has an area of 178.2 square kilometers, comparatively equivalent to Aruba. There is a road connecting the district with Yangi Qala District and Dashti Qala District.

The district is bordered by Yangi Qala District to the north, Rustaq District to the east, Dashti Qala District to the south, and Darqad District to the west.

== History ==
In November 2015, the Taliban launched an attack on the district center. The security forces retreated 6 km toward the district center, and lost 2 policemen, with 6 wounded. Later, in March 2017, the Taliban launched an attack on the district center and set fire to the governor's office before being repulsed. There were 24 security incidents from 1 September 2016 to 31 May 2017, with over 100 families fleeing both Khwaja Bahauddin and Darqad in May 2017. There have been several more security incidents since then.

On 19 May 2020, Taliban insurgents launched attacks on checkpoints in Khwaja Bahauddin District, killing nine pro-government militiamen and wounding six others.

== Demographics ==
Uzbeks, Tajiks, and Pashtuns live in Khwaja Bahauddin. The district has a population of 25852 and a sex ratio of 51 males for every 50 females. The median age is 15.5, and 48.2 percent of the population is employed. About 40% of the unemployed is seeking work. The average household size in Khwaja Bahauddin is 6.9, meaning there are about 3,750 households in the district.

== Economy ==
About half of the people employed in Khwaja Bahauddin are involved in agriculture, hunting, forestry, or fishing. Roughly 40,000 jerib of land is cultivated twice each year and there are farming cooperatives available. However, agricultural output is low because of reliance on traditional farming techniques, lack of modern equipment and cold storehouses, and illegal natural resource use by armed groups.

Forests and mines are also located in the district, but there is a lack of engineers and equipment.

== Education and Healthcare ==
There is limited access to primary and secondary schools in Khwaja Bahauddin, and one religious school. However, there is a lack of teachers, buildings, budget, and training. The district has a 44% literacy rate.

The district has access to some health clinics, including the Iranian Clinic, the Turkish Clinic, and the KAHF Clinic as of 2006. However, there is a lack of funds and a high mortality rate. On 1 March 2020, a health center in the district was closed.
