= Dashti Qala District =

- District
- Location of the district in Takhar Province
- Coordinates: 37°8′35″N 69°27′13″E
- Country: Afghanistan
- Province: Takhār Province
- Recognized: January 2004

Government
  - Police Commander: Abdul Raouf Hamidi

Area
  - Total: 270 km^{2} (100 sq mi)
- Elevation: 455 m (1,493 ft)

Population (2020)
  - Total: 41,659
  - Density: 220/km^{2} (570/sq mi)
- Population total is of 2020, and the density is of 2015

Ethnicity
  - Uzbek: 60%
  - Tajik: 35%
  - Pashtun: 5%
- Time zone: UTC+4:30 (Afghanistan Standard Time)
- Post Code: 3759

Dashti Qala District (دشت قلعه) is a district of Takhar Province, Afghanistan. It split from Khwaja Ghar District in June 2005. This district borders Tajikistan. Ai-Khanoum, probably founded by the Seleucid Empire, is located in this district. In 2018, this district was considered contested between the government and the Taliban.

== Geography ==
Dashti Qala District has an area of 270 square kilometers, comparatively equivalent to Niue. The Panj River borders the district, and the Kokcha River crosses Dashti Qala. The climate of the district is classified as cold, semi-arid steppe on the Köppen–Geiger climate classification system.

=== Location ===
The district is surrounded by Darqad to the northwest, Khwaja Bahauddin to the north, Rustaq to the east, Khwaja Ghar to the south, and Khatlon province (Tajikistan) to the west. The Panj River forms the border between Khatlon Province and Dashti Qala.

== Demographics ==
Dashti Qala has a gender ratio of 103 males for every 100 females, matching the province. Dashti Qala has a young population, with an average age of 15.8 years. 84.3% of the population have never completed a class (which is 74.2% of males and 95% of females). 44.7% of Dashti Qala's population did not work prior to the United Nations Population Fund survey in 2015. Of that, 44.7%, 90% were unable to work. Dashti Qala has 31.5% of children under age 5. The average household size is 6.9 people.

== Economy ==
Wood is the main source of energy for heating and cooking. Most inhabitants use the sun for light. Dashti Qala receives 95.2% of its water from dug wells. 99.3% of houses are made of wood and dirt. Meanwhile, 24.6% of the households have an improved sanitation facility. About half of the houses have two rooms.

== Ai-Khanoum ==
Ai-Khanoum is the archaeological site of a Hellenistic city in Dashti Qala District, Takhar Province, Afghanistan. The city, whose original name is unknown, was likely founded by an early ruler of the Seleucid Empire and served as a military and economic centre for the rulers of the Greco-Bactrian Kingdom until its destruction c. 145 BC. Rediscovered in 1961, the ruins of the city were excavated by a French team of archaeologists until the outbreak of conflict in Afghanistan in the late 1970s.

== See also ==
- Districts of Afghanistan
- Takhar Province
