= Urtatagai conflict (1913) =

Border conflict between Afghanistan and the Russian Empire

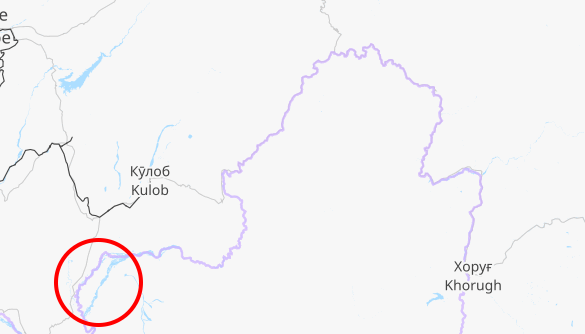
- Map of Afghanistan's northeastern border. Urtatagai is highlighted by a red circle.
Date	November – December 1913
Location	Urta Tagay
Territorial changes	Status quo ante bellum: Afghan forces occupy the island but later withdraw after agreement

Belligerents
Russian Empire	Emirate of Afghanistan

Commanders and leaders
Nicholas II	Habibullah Khan

The 1913 Urtatagai conflict was a conflict between the Emirate of Afghanistan and the Russian Empire over control of the island of Urta Tagay, which took place 1913. It began in November, when Afghan troops were deployed on Urtatagai after it had merged with the Afghan bank, placing it within Afghan territory. Sometime later, the flow of the river once again separated the island, and on an agreement on 13 December at Ashgabat, the Afghan leadership agreed to return the island, ending the conflict.
