= Kishim District =

Coordinates: 36°46′12″N 70°07′54″E

Kishim کشيم
- District
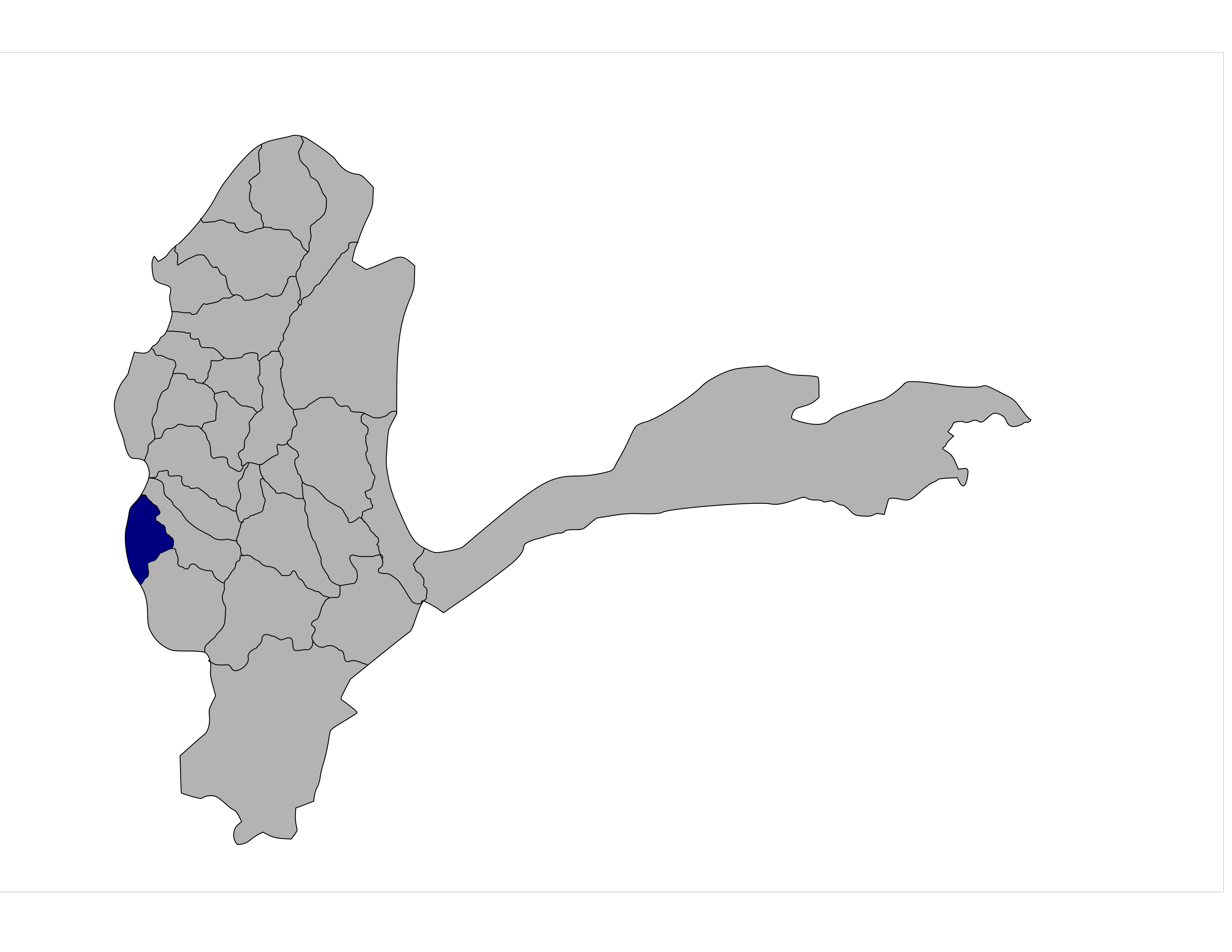
- Country: Afghanistan
- Province: Badakhshan
- Capital: Mashhad

Government
  - Type: District council

Population
  - Estimate: 91,407

Kishim District (Dari: کشم) is one of the 29 districts of Badakhshan province in eastern Afghanistan. The district capital is Mashhad. The district is located in the Keshem Valley, a primarily rural area on the western edge of the province, and is home to approximately 91,407 residents, making it the second most populous district of the province.

== Climate ==
Kishim has a humid continental climate (Köppen: Dsb), with warm summers and cold winters. The temperature in July averages 21.6 °C (70.9 °F). January has the lowest average temperature of the year. It is −3.8 °C (25.2 °F).

Climate data for Kishim
Month	Jan	Feb	Mar	Apr	May	Jun	Jul	Aug	Sep	Oct	Nov	Dec	Year
Mean daily maximum °C (°F)	1.1 (34.0)	3.0 (37.4)	10.1 (50.2)	16.1 (61.0)	20.7 (69.3)	25.1 (77.2)	27.9 (82.2)	27.1 (80.8)	23.2 (73.8)	17.2 (63.0)	10.0 (50.0)	3.9 (39.0)	15.4 (59.8)
Daily mean °C (°F)	−3.8 (25.2)	−1.9 (28.6)	4.1 (39.4)	9.5 (49.1)	14.2 (57.6)	18.5 (65.3)	21.6 (70.9)	20.9 (69.6)	17.0 (62.6)	10.9 (51.6)	4.0 (39.2)	−1.7 (28.9)	9.4 (49.0)
Mean daily minimum °C (°F)	−8.7 (16.3)	−6.8 (19.8)	−1.9 (28.6)	2.9 (37.2)	7.7 (45.9)	11.8 (53.2)	15.2 (59.4)	14.7 (58.5)	10.7 (51.3)	4.5 (40.1)	−2.0 (28.4)	−7.2 (19.0)	3.4 (38.1)
Average precipitation mm (inches)	63 (2.5)	76 (3.0)	109 (4.3)	152 (6.0)	127 (5.0)	27 (1.1)	5 (0.2)	2 (0.1)	6 (0.2)	33 (1.3)	57 (2.2)	51 (2.0)	559 (22.0)
Source: Climate-Data.org
