= Takhar Province =

Province of Afghanistan

Takhar تخار
- Province
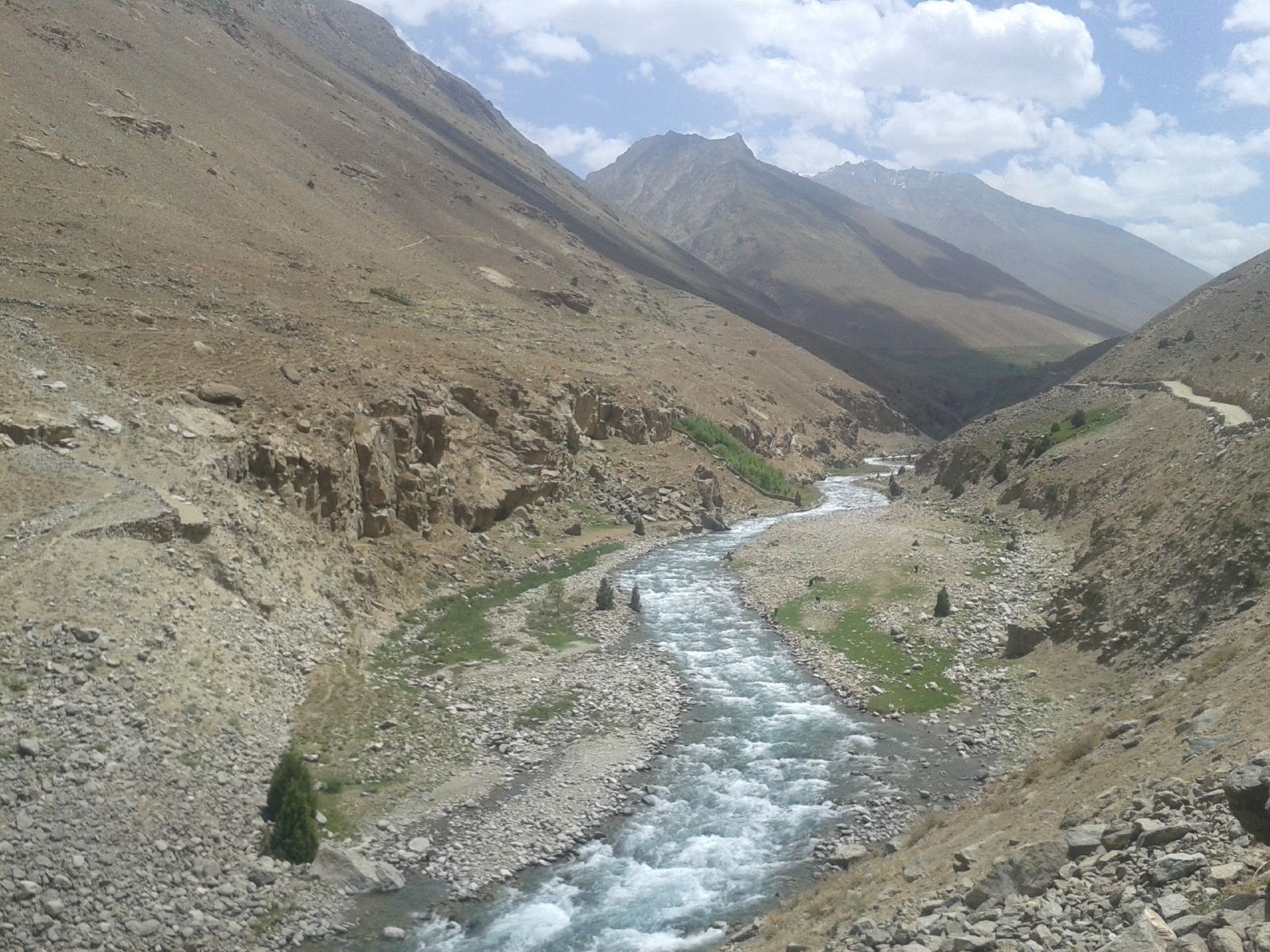
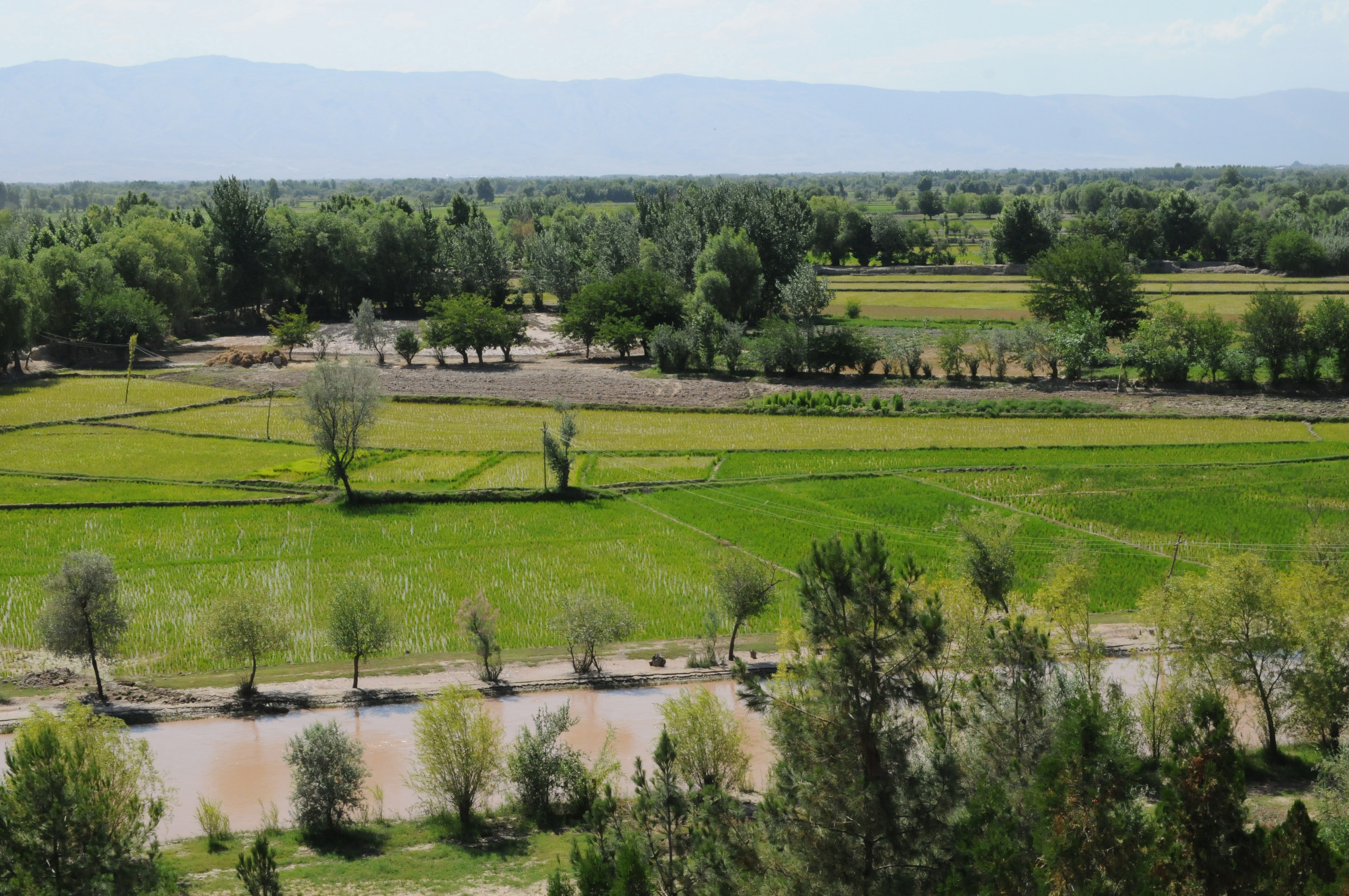
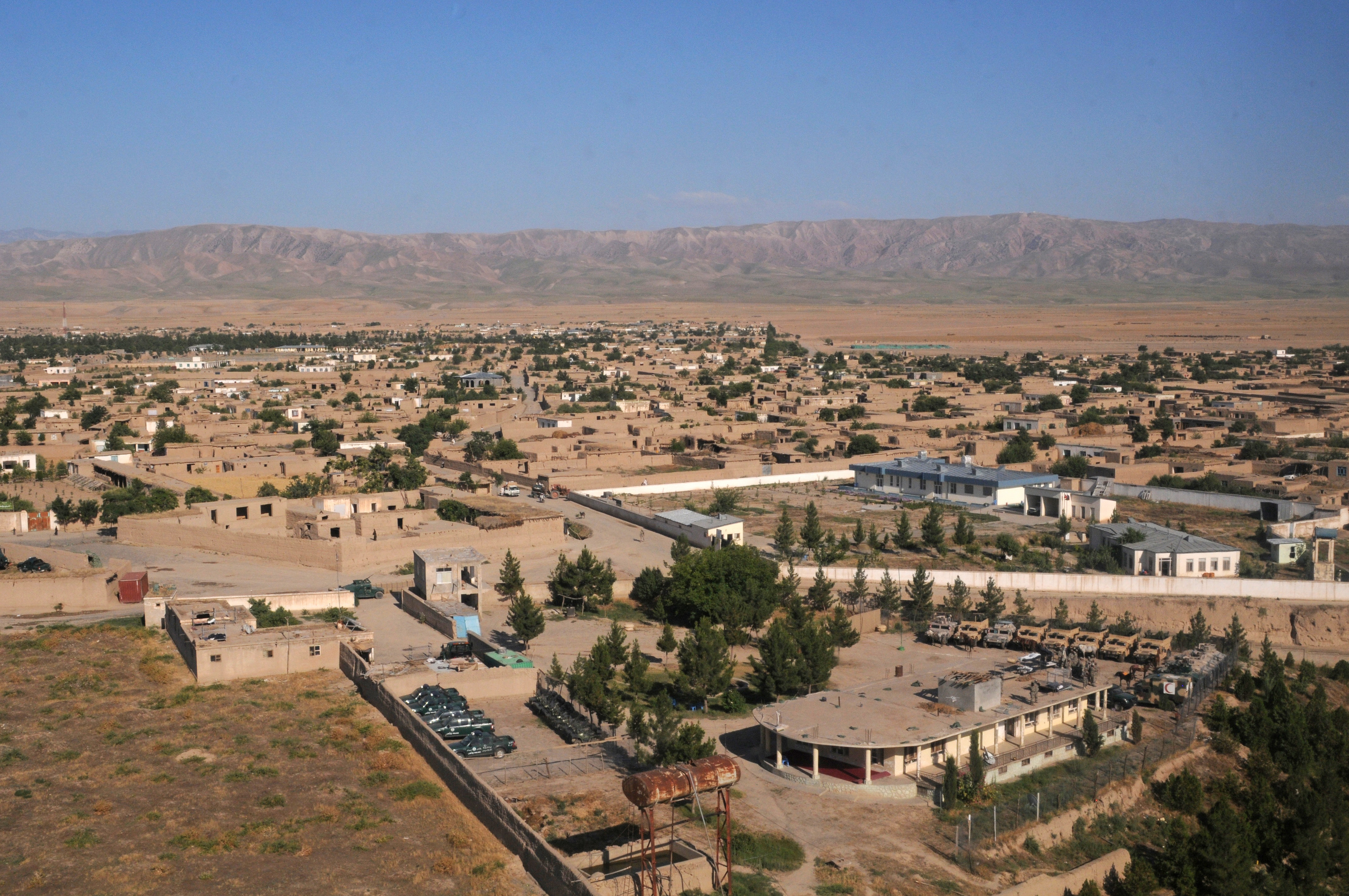
- From the top, Warsaj District, View from atop a hill in Khawajah Bahawuddin, Darqad District

- Map of Afghanistan with Takhar highlighted
- Coordinates (Capital): 36.7°N 69.8°E
- Country: Afghanistan
- Capital: Taloqan

Government
  - Governor: Mawlawi Zia ur Rahman Madani
  - Deputy Governor: Haji Kazim
  - Police Chief: Habibullah Shakir

Area
  - Total: 12,333 km^{2} (4,762 sq mi)

Population (2021)
  - Total: 1,113,173
  - Density: 90.260/km^{2} (233.77/sq mi)
- Time zone: UTC+4:30 (Afghanistan Time)
- Postal code: 37xx
- Main languages: Persian, Uzbek
- Website: http://takhar.gov.af/en/

Takhar (Pashto, (Note: Pashto pronunciation: [t̪a.xɑr]) Dari: (Note: Dari pronunciation: [t̪ʰä.xɑːɾ]) تخار) is one of the 34 provinces of Afghanistan, located in the northeast of the country next to Tajikistan. It is surrounded by Badakhshan in the east, Panjshir in the south, and Baghlan and Kunduz in the west. The city of Taloqan serves as its capital. The province contains 17 districts, over 1,000 villages, and approximately 1,113,173 people, which is multi-ethnic and mostly a rural society.

== History ==
=== Early history ===
The region of present-day Takhar Province was historically part of a broader cultural and political zone known as Takharistan, referenced in early Iranian traditions. It formed part of ancient Bactria, a major center of civilization in Central Asia. Archaeological evidence suggests that the area was inhabited by Indo-Iranian populations and later came under the influence of Hellenistic culture following the campaigns of Alexander the Great in the 4th century BCE.

One of the most significant archaeological sites in the province is Ai-Khanoum, located near the Amu Darya and the Kokcha River. Established during the Hellenistic period, the city is widely believed to have been a major urban center of the Greco-Bacterian Kingdom. Excavations have revealed a well-planned city layout, including administrative buildings, temples, and residential quarters, along with artifacts such as coins, sculptures, and ceramics that reflect a fusion of Greek and local traditions.

During the early centuries CE, the region became part of the Kushan Empire, which played a key role in facilitating trade and cultural exchange along the Silk Road. This period saw the spread the spread of Buddhism and the development of Greco-Buddhist artistic traditions in the wider region. The historical city of Taloqan, which later became the provincial capital, also emerged as an important settlement during antiquity.

=== 7th to 16th centuries ===
From the 7th century onward, the region of Takhar was gradually incorporated into the expanding Islamic world following Arab conquests. It became part of successive Islamic dynasties that ruled over Transoxiana and Greater Khorasan, contributing to the region’s integration into broader political and cultural networks of the medieval Islamic world.

During this period, Taliqan developed as a regional center of administration and trade. The population largely adopted Islam, while elements of earlier cultural traditions persisted in local customs and practices.

In the 13th century, the region experienced significant disruption during the Mongol invasions led by Genghis Khan. The city of Ai-Khanoum and other settlements were destroyed or abandoned during this time.

In the centuries that followed, Takhar came under the control of various regional powers, including the Timurids and later Central Asian khanates.

By the late medieval period, Takhar formed part of the wider historical region of Qataghan, maintaining its role as a link between Central Asia and northern Afghanistan.

=== 16th to 20th centuries ===
Between the early 16th century and the mid-18th century, the territory was ruled by the Khanate of Bukhara.

It was given to Ahmad Shah Durrani by Murad Beg of Bukhara after a treaty of friendship was reached in or about 1750, and became part of the Durrani Empire. It was ruled by the Durranis followed by the Barakzai dynasty and was untouched by the British during the three Anglo-Afghan wars that were fought in the 19th and early 20th centuries.

=== 1964–2001 ===
It was established in 1964 when Qataghan Province was divided into three provinces: Baghlan, Kunduz and Takhar. During the 1980s Soviet–Afghan War, the area fell under the influence of Rabbani and Ahmad Shah Massoud. It was controlled by the Northern Alliance in the 1990s. It experienced some fighting between the Northern Alliance and the Taliban forces. Takhar holds notoriety as the location where Mujahideen Commander Ahmad Shah Massoud was assassinated on 9 September 2001 by suspected al-Qaeda agents.

=== 2001–2021 ===
Following the September 11 attacks, commonly known as 9/11, and amidst the United States' intervention, General Mohamad Daud and General Shajahan Noori, both widely recognized figures, played instrumental roles in leading the Afghanistan government forces to reclaim control of the northeastern province from the Taliban.

International Security Assistance Force (ISAF) took over security responsibility of the area in the early 2000s, which was led by Germany. The province also began to see some developments and the establishment of Afghan National Security Forces (ANSF). In a minor incident in July 2008, the Afghan National Police killed Mullah Usman when several armed Taliban militants under his command raided a police checkpoint in the Kalafgan district. This was the first time since the fall of Taliban regime in 2001 that the Taliban insurgents engaged police in this province. Mullah Usman was the most senior Taliban commander in the northeast region of Afghanistan, according to the Afghan Interior Ministry.

In May 2009, Taliban insurgents fighting Afghan government attacked the Baharak district in Takhar province. A bomb attack on 28 May 2011 killed General Shahjahan Noori, Mohammed Daud Daud and injured Governor Taqwa. Several German soldiers and Afghans were also killed.

In April 2012, the water supply at the Rostaq district's school for girls was poisoned by unknown insurgents, sickening at least 140 Afghan schoolgirls and teachers ranging in age from 14 to 30, causing them to be hospitalized and some to partially lose consciousness, though there were no deaths as a result of the incident.

During the 2021 Taliban offensive, Takhar Province experienced attacks as the withdrawal of US troops took place. In response, Mohibullah Noori emerged as a prominent figure, leading the second resistance to support security forces and prevent the Taliban from taking control of Taluqan city. On 8 August 2021, the Taliban eventually gained control of the province but despite this, the Resistance Forces have remained present in the area.

=== 2015 earthquake ===
On 26 October, the 7.5 Mw Hindu Kush earthquake shook northern Afghanistan with a maximum Mercalli intensity of VIII (Severe). This earthquake destroyed almost 30,000 homes, left several hundred dead, and more than 1,700 injured.

== Administrative divisions ==
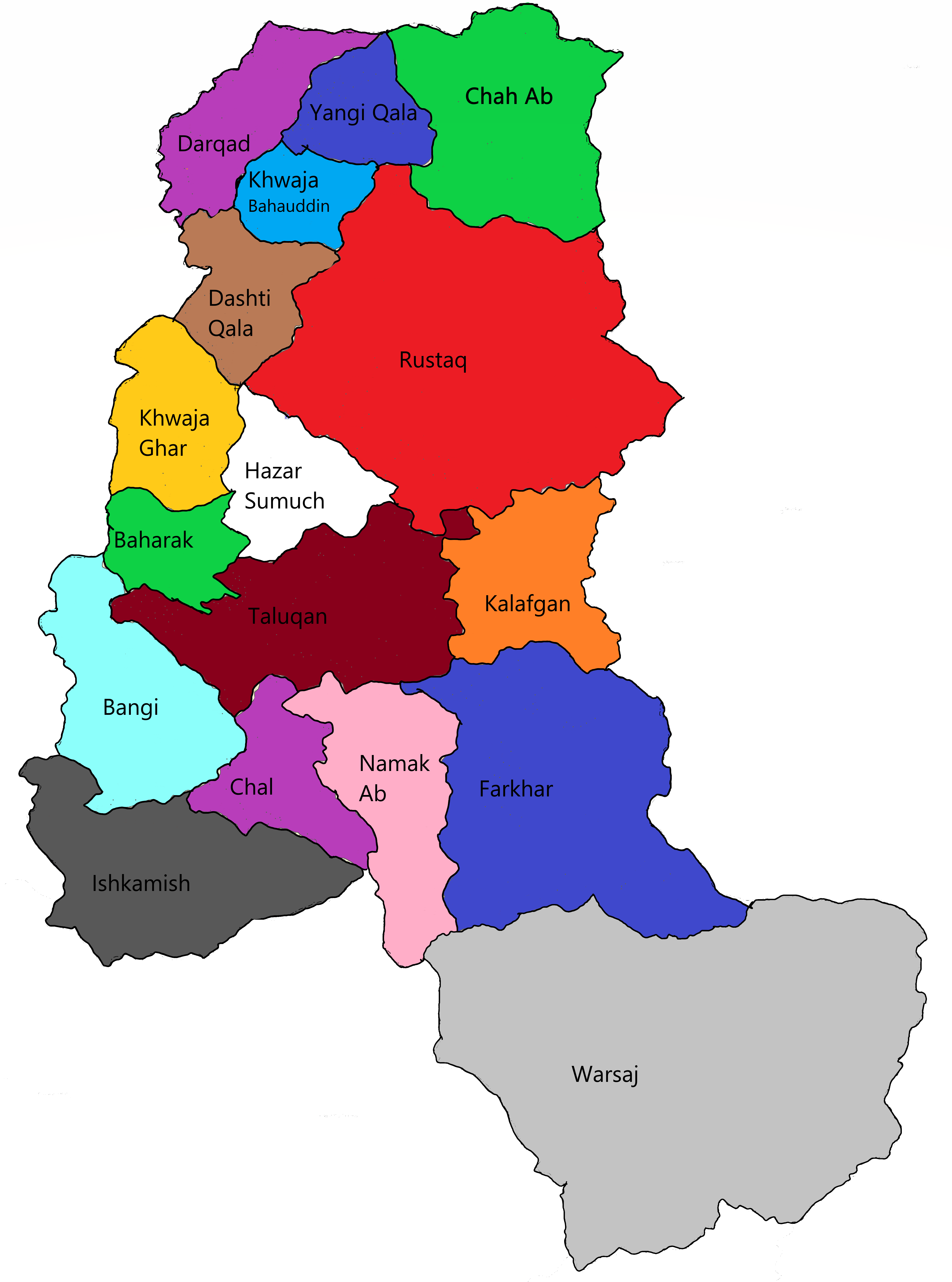
Districts of Takhar

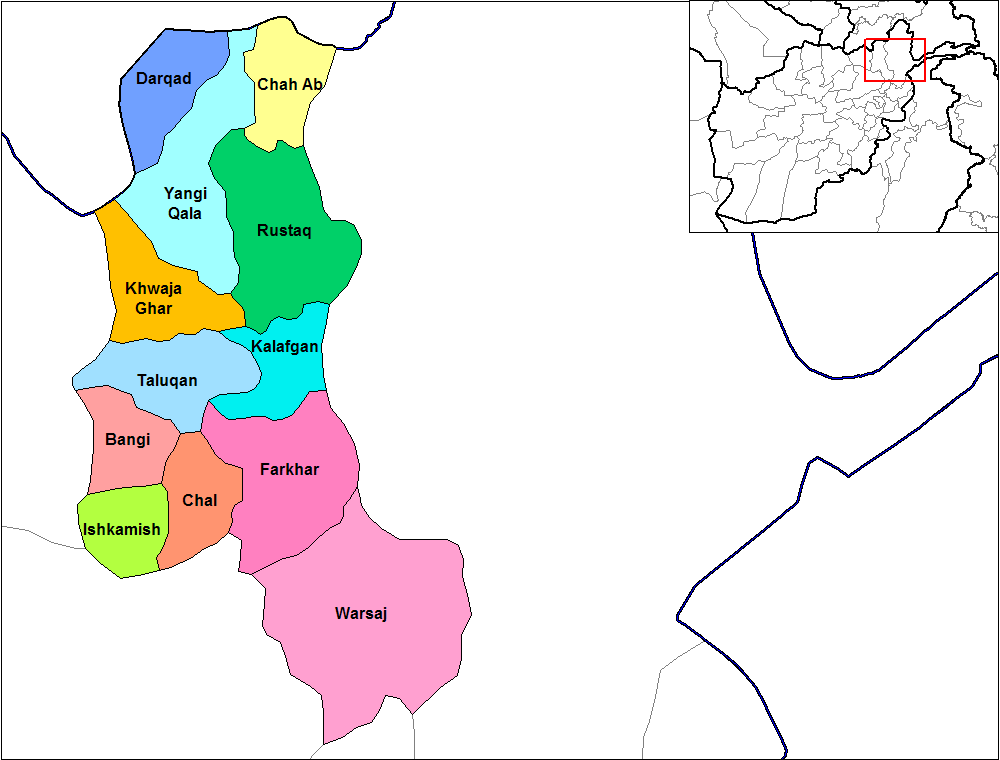
Map of the districts of Takhar as of January 2004, prior to the redrawing of provincial and district boundaries later that year

Districts of Takhar Province
District	Capital	Population	Area in km^{2}	Pop. density	Number of villages and ethnic groups
Baharak	_	34,942	379	92	74 villages. 83% Tajik, 10% Pashtun, 5% Uzbeks, 2% Hazara.
Bangi	_	39,725	434	92	59 villages. 80% Tajik, 10% Uzbek, 6% Hazara, 4% Pashtun.
Chah Ab	_	90,011	833	108	63 villages. 98% Tajik, 2% Uzbek.
Chal	_	31,885	404	79	58 villages. 55% Tajik, 38% Uzbek, 5% Hazara, 1% Pashtun, 1% Gujar.
Darqad	_	30,424	310	98	34 villages. Predominantely Uzbek, few Tajik.
Dashti Qala	_	36,137	314	115	49 villages. 70% Tajik, 25% Uzbek, 5% Pashtun
Farkhar	_	53,051	1,306	41	75 villages. 95% Tajik, 4% Hazara, 1% Uzbek.
Hazar Sumuch	_	15,545	265	59	28 villages.PredominantlyPashtun, Few Uzbek, Turkmen & Tajik.
Ishkamish	_	66,695	948	70	103 villages. 40% Tajik, 30% Uzbek, 20% Pashtun, 10% Gujar.
Kalafgan	_	39,858	526	76	42 villages 95% Uzbek, 2% Hazara, 2% Tajik, 1% Pashtun.
Khwaja Bahauddin	_	26,306	182	144	25 villages. Predominantely Uzbek.
Khwaja Ghar	_	76,132	404	188	62 villages. 70% Uzbek, 20% Pashtun, 10% Tajik.
Namak Ab		13,817	431	32	28 villages. 100% Tajik.
Rustaq	_	186,144	1,824	102	179 villages 70% Tajik,30% Uzbek
Taluqan	Taluqan	258,724	833	311	40% Uzbek,40% Tajik, 10% Pashtun, 5% Hazara, 5% Baloch and Turkmen.
Warsaj	_	42,914	2,668	16	94 villages. 100% Tajik.
Yangi Qala	_	50,782	360	141	64 villages 65% Uzbeks, 18% Pashtun, 15% Tajik, 2% Hazara.
Takhar	Taluqan	1,093,092	12,458	88	51.6% Tajiks, 34% Uzbeks, 8.0% Pashtuns, 2.1% Hazaras, 0.6% Gujar, 0.5% Baloch, <0.5% Turkmen. (Note: Note: "Predominantely" or "dominated" is interpreted as 99%, "majority" as 70%, "mixed" as 1/(number of ethnicities), "minority" as 30% and "few" or "some" as 1%.)

== Economy ==
Agriculture and mining are the main industries of the province. Takhar has coal reserves which are being exploited by hand in some villages and sold in the region. The local population considers gold the most relevant resource for the Province. Gold is being washed in Takhar River, and about 2 kg are being transported to the specific weekly markets in the city of Taloqan. Also the city is a main source of construction materials like: loam, sand, and different types of stones. Takhar province is known for its salt mountains and you can find large deposits of fine salt in the region. The Takcha Khanna salt mine is one of the growing number of salt supplier, for the population of Takhar and northern Afghanistan. While the mines offer economic opportunities in the region, the availability of iodized salt considerably reduces the prevalence of health problems related to iodine deficiency.

== Demographics ==
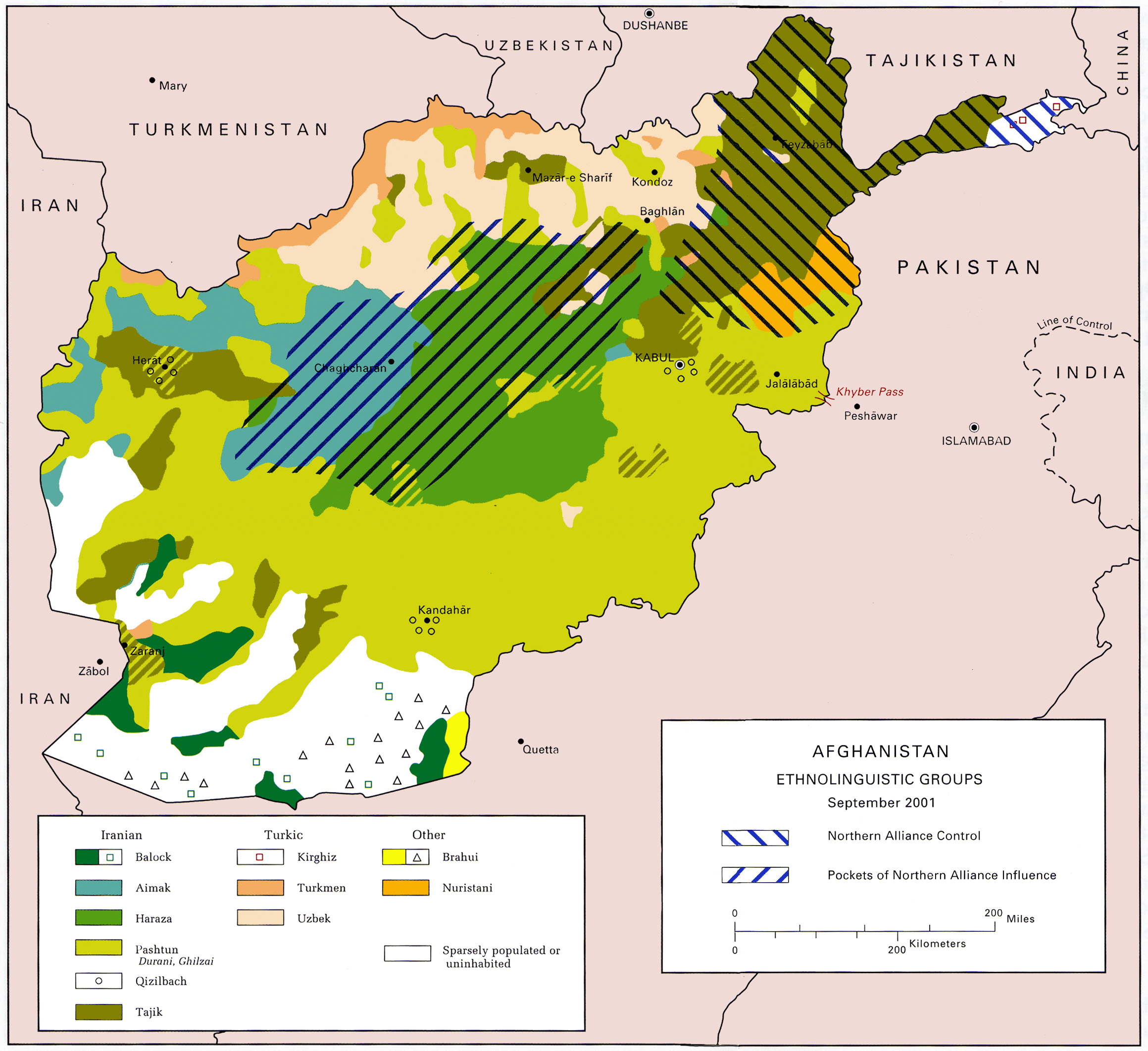
Ethnolinguistic groups in Afghanistan

=== Population ===
As of 2021, the total population of the province is about 1,113,173.

=== Ethnicity, languages and religion ===
Takhar is mostly tribal and a rural society. The main inhabitants of Takhar province are majority Tajiks and Uzbeks with aboriginal Pashtun minority. Other smaller ethnic groups include Hazaras, Gujars and Balochi.

Estimated ethnolinguistic and -religious composition
Ethnicity	Uzbek	Tajik/ Farsiwan	Pashtun	Hazara	Arab	Others	Sources
Period	Uzbek	Tajik/ Farsiwan	Pashtun	Hazara	Arab	Others	Sources

2004–2021 (Islamic Republic)	44 – 53%	37 – 42%	4 – 10%	2 – <4%	0 – 3%	1 – <4%
2020 EU	1st	2nd	–	–	–	–
2019 AA	53%	37%	4%	2%	3%	1%
2018 UN	44%	42%	10%	∅	–	∅ (Note: incl. Baloch, Pashayi and Gujjar.)
2015 CSSF (Note: Demographic information is based on data from 2015.)	∅	predominant	∅ (Note: incl. Kochi.)	∅	–	–
2015 CP	∅	∅	∅	∅	–	–
2015 NPS	∅	∅	∅	∅	–	–
2011 PRT	majority		minority (Note: excl. Kochi.)		–	–
2011 USA	majority		minority		–	–

Legend:
- ∅: Ethnicity mentioned in source but not quantified
- –: Ethnicity not mentioned specifically
- Source abbreviations: Empirical sources: AA – Federal Foreign Office of Germany, Government sources: CP – Colombo Plan, EU – European Union Agency for Asylum, PRT – Provincial Reconstruction Team of the United States government, UN – United Nations Assistance Mission in Afghanistan, Editorial sources: CSSF – Center for the Scientific Study of Families, NPS – Naval Postgraduate School, USA – United States Army.

== See also ==
- Tokharistan
- Taloqan
- Rostaq
- Bactria
- Tajiks
- Buzkashi
- Pahlavoni
- Qataghan
- Yarid Dynasty
- Chapans
