= Taloqan =

City in Takhar province, Afghanistan

Taloqan تالقان
- Provincial capital
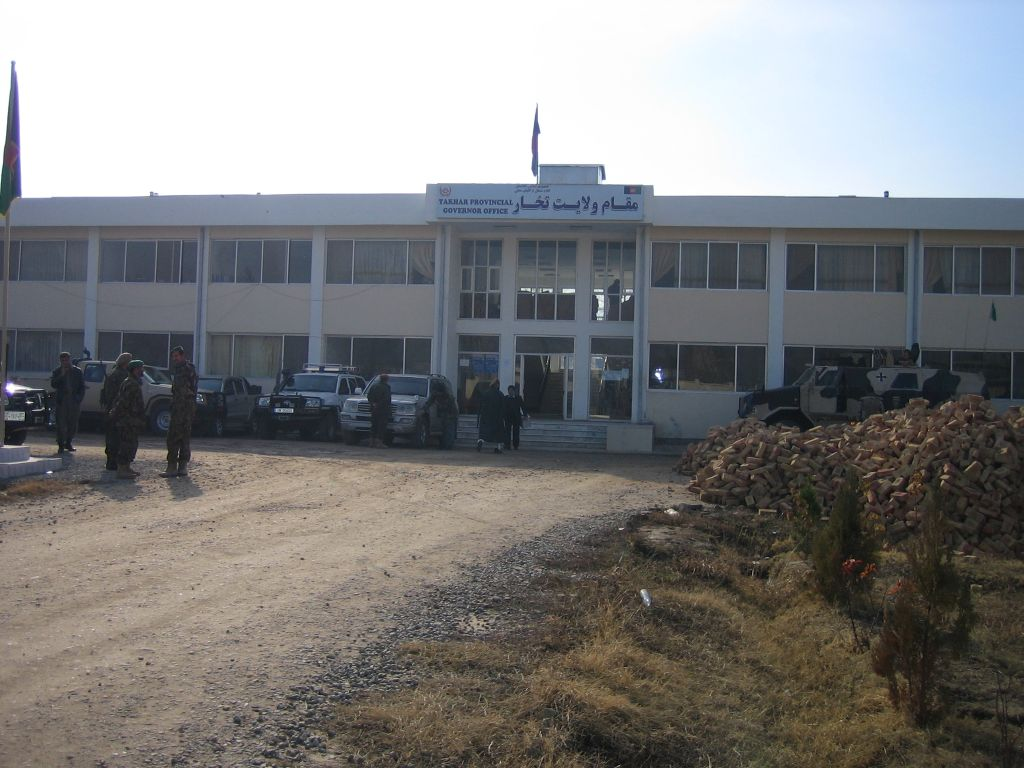
- Takhar governor's office in Taloqan

- Location in Afghanistan
- Coordinates: 36°43′N 69°31′E
- Country: Afghanistan
- Province: Takhar
- District: Taloqan

Government
  - Type: Municipality

Area
  - Land: 107 km^{2} (41 sq mi)
- Elevation: 876 m (2,874 ft)

Population (2025)
  - Provincial capital: 284,990
  - Urban: 94,438
  - Rural: 190,552
- Time zone: UTC+04:30 (Afghanistan Time)
- ISO 3166 code: AF-TQN

Taloqan, (Note: Pashto: تالقان, romanized: Tāluqān [t̪ɑ.lu.kɑn]; Dari: تالقان, romanized: Tāluqān [t̪ʰɑː.lʊ́'qɑ́ːn]) also written as Taleqan or Taluqan, is a city in northern Afghanistan, serving as the capital of Takhar Province. It is within the jurisdiction of Taloqan District and has an estimated population of 284,990 people. Ethnically, they are Tajiks, Uzbeks, Pashtuns and Hazaras.

Taloqan is home to Takhar University, which is in the northwestern part of the city. The Taloqan Airport is a few miles to the north. The city has a number of bazaars, business centers, public parks, banks, hotels, restaurants, mosques, hospitals, universities, and places to play sports or relax.

Taloqan sits at an altitude of 876 m (2,874 ft) above sea level, and has a land area of 107 km^{2} (41 sq mi) with 28,691 dwelling units in it. The city is administratively divided into 6 city districts (nahias). There is a major road that passes through the city, linking it with nearby Kunduz in the west and Fayzabad in Badakhshan Province in the northeast.

== History ==
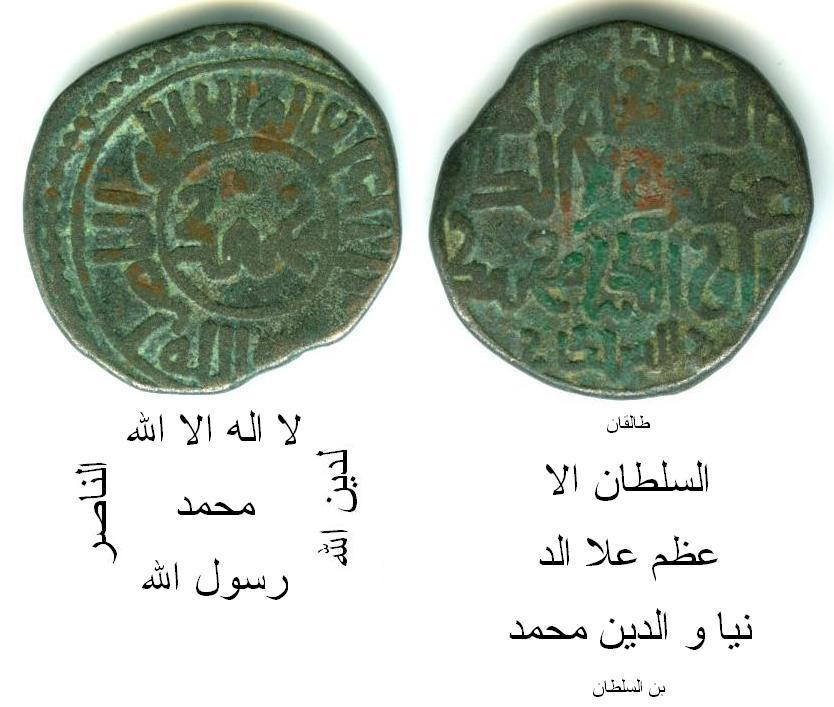
A coin minted in Taloqan under Muhammad II of Khwarezm (1200–1220).

The old city to the west on the riverside was described by Marco Polo in 1275 CE as:

"a castle called Taikhan, where there is a great corn-market, and the country round is fine and fruitful. The hills that lie to the south of it are large and lofty. They all consist of white salt, extremely hard, with which the people for a distance of thirty days' journey round, come to provide themselves, for it is esteemed the purest that is found in the world. It is so hard, that it can be broken only with great iron hammers. The quantity is so great that all the countries of the earth might be supplied from thence."

Taloqan had earlier come under Mongol control during the campaigns of Genghis Khan in the early 13th century. Following the fall of Balkh and the destruction of other Khwarazmian cities, the Mongols besieged and captured Taloqan, reportedly massacring its inhabitants as part of their broader campaign to subdue Khwarazmian resistance.

In 1603, Taloqan ("Talhan") was visited by another European explorer, Bento de Góis, who was traveling with a caravan from Kabul to Yarkand (then the capital of Kashgaria).

=== Recent history ===
The mujahideen headquarters of Ahmad Shah Massoud were located in Taloqan during his campaign against the Soviet Army and the Taliban. On 5 September 2000, Taloqan became the last major city to fall to the Taliban, after a siege which claimed the lives of hundreds of civilians. The capture of the city by the Taliban also triggered a mass exodus in the population, with civilians fleeing towards Imam Sahib and the Panjshir Valley. Northern Alliance forces managed to stop the Taliban advance to the north and to the east of the city, but were not able to retake it. Taloqan was liberated in November 2001 by forces of the Northern Alliance following the United States invasion of Afghanistan.

The city was attacked during the 2021 Taliban offensive (which coincided with the withdrawal of United States troops). On May 2, 2021, Piram Qul, a close aide to Abdul Rashid Dostum and one of the most influential anti-Taliban figures in Takhar, was killed in Rustaq District.

Following the fall of several districts of Takhar to the Taliban, on June 20, 2021, a group of Takhar elders including Mohibullah Noori and Ashraf Ani announced at a press conference in Kabul that they will send a group to mobilize people resistant in support of Afghan security forces in Takhar. Mohibullah Noori led the group, which entered Taloqan on 26 June 2021 and united the Takhar commanders to resist against the Taliban.

The Taliban tried to take the city in July 2021, however the attack was repulsed. Later, during Taliban offensive Haji Agha Gol Qatghani was killed and Khair Mohammad Teymour injured and all forces, including provincial officials, retreated to the Versaj district. Taloqan was eventually captured by the Taliban on 8 August 2021.

== Climate ==
Taloqan has a Mediterranean climate (Köppen climate classification Csa). In winter there is more rainfall than in summer. The average annual temperature in Taloqan is 14.6 °C (58.3 °F). About 475 mm (18.70 in) of precipitation falls annually.

Climate data for Taloqan
Month	Jan	Feb	Mar	Apr	May	Jun	Jul	Aug	Sep	Oct	Nov	Dec	Year
Mean daily maximum °C (°F)	7.2 (45.0)	9.1 (48.4)	15.4 (59.7)	20.5 (68.9)	26.0 (78.8)	31.6 (88.9)	34.1 (93.4)	32.7 (90.9)	28.1 (82.6)	21.4 (70.5)	13.8 (56.8)	9.1 (48.4)	20.8 (69.4)
Daily mean °C (°F)	1.0 (33.8)	2.9 (37.2)	9.1 (48.4)	14.6 (58.3)	20.1 (68.2)	25.4 (77.7)	28.0 (82.4)	26.5 (79.7)	21.8 (71.2)	15.2 (59.4)	7.9 (46.2)	2.6 (36.7)	14.6 (58.3)
Mean daily minimum °C (°F)	−4.6 (23.7)	−3.2 (26.2)	2.5 (36.5)	7.6 (45.7)	12.3 (54.1)	16.5 (61.7)	19.5 (67.1)	18.5 (65.3)	14.3 (57.7)	8.6 (47.5)	2.4 (36.3)	−2.8 (27.0)	7.6 (45.7)
Average precipitation mm (inches)	53 (2.1)	68 (2.7)	90 (3.5)	96 (3.8)	60 (2.4)	7 (0.3)	1 (0.0)	0 (0)	2 (0.1)	17 (0.7)	40 (1.6)	41 (1.6)	475 (18.8)

== Taloqan in Islamic sources ==
The testament of the Islamic prophet Muhammad indicates that the city will play a major role regarding the Mahdi. A narration by chain, Imam Baqir states: "Allah Almighty has a treasure in Talaqan which is of neither gold nor silver, but consists of twelve thousand (people), having 'Ahmad, Ahmad' for their slogan. They will be led by a young Hashemite man riding a gray mule and wearing a red headband. It is as if I can see him crossing the Euphrates. Should you hear of his coming, rush to him even if you have to crawl over the snow Another narration states: "Talaqan is a place of treasures of Allah. These treasures are not of gold and silver, but consist of people who have recognised Allah as they should have."

== See also ==
- List of cities in Afghanistan
- Tokharistan
