= List of rivers of Afghanistan =

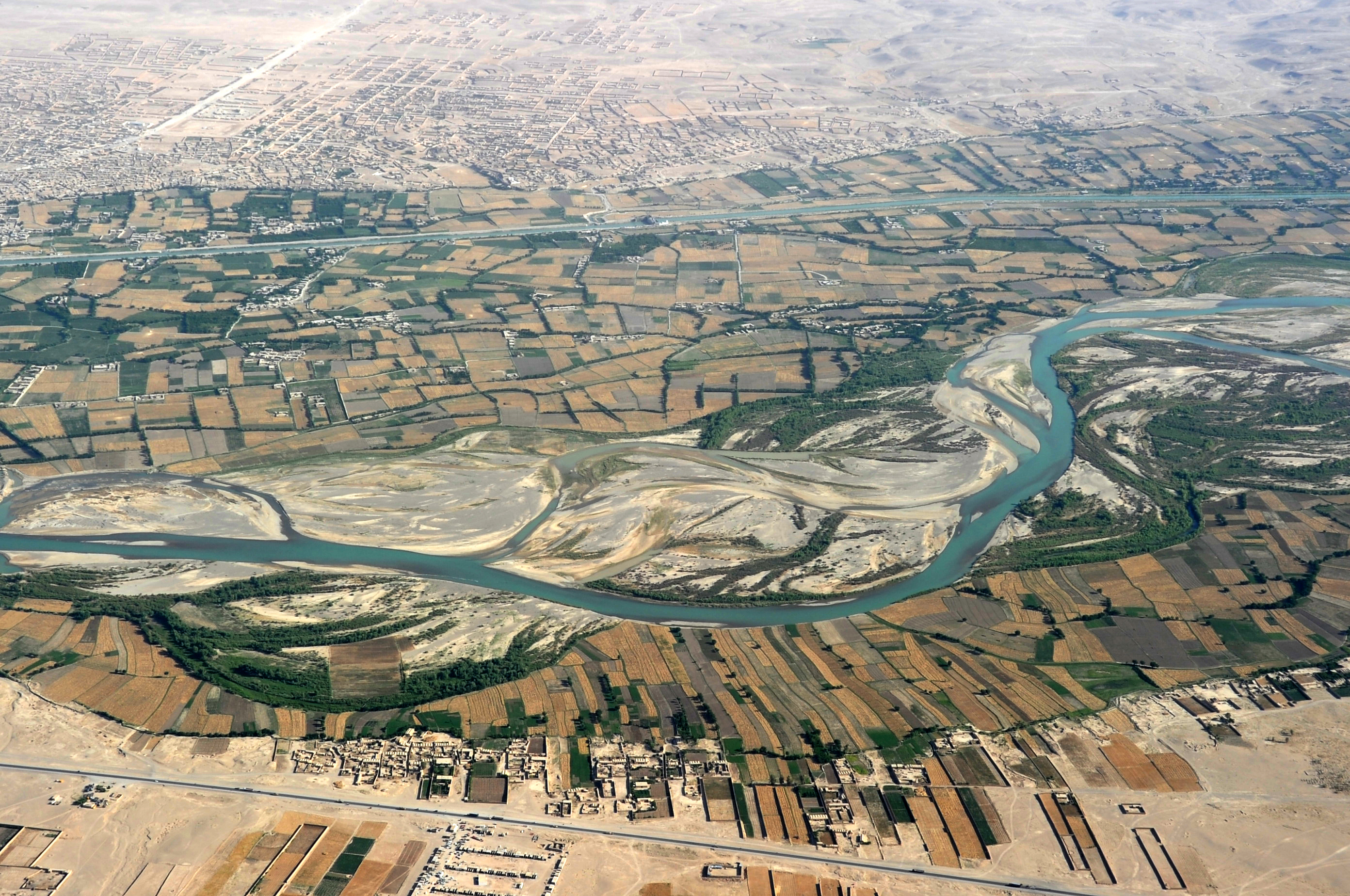
Aerial photograph of Helmand River in Helmand Province

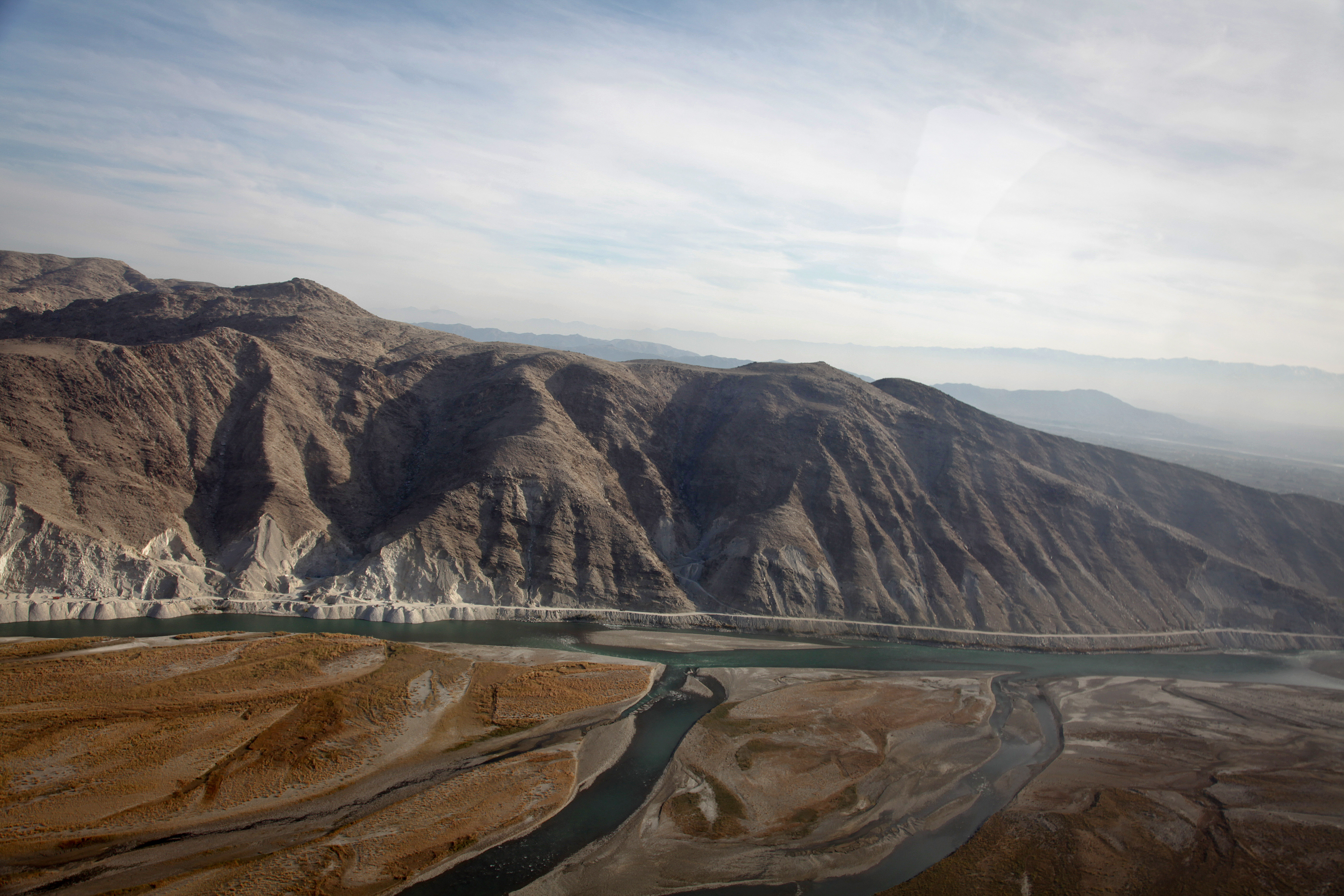
Branches of the Kunar River meet in Nangarhar Province

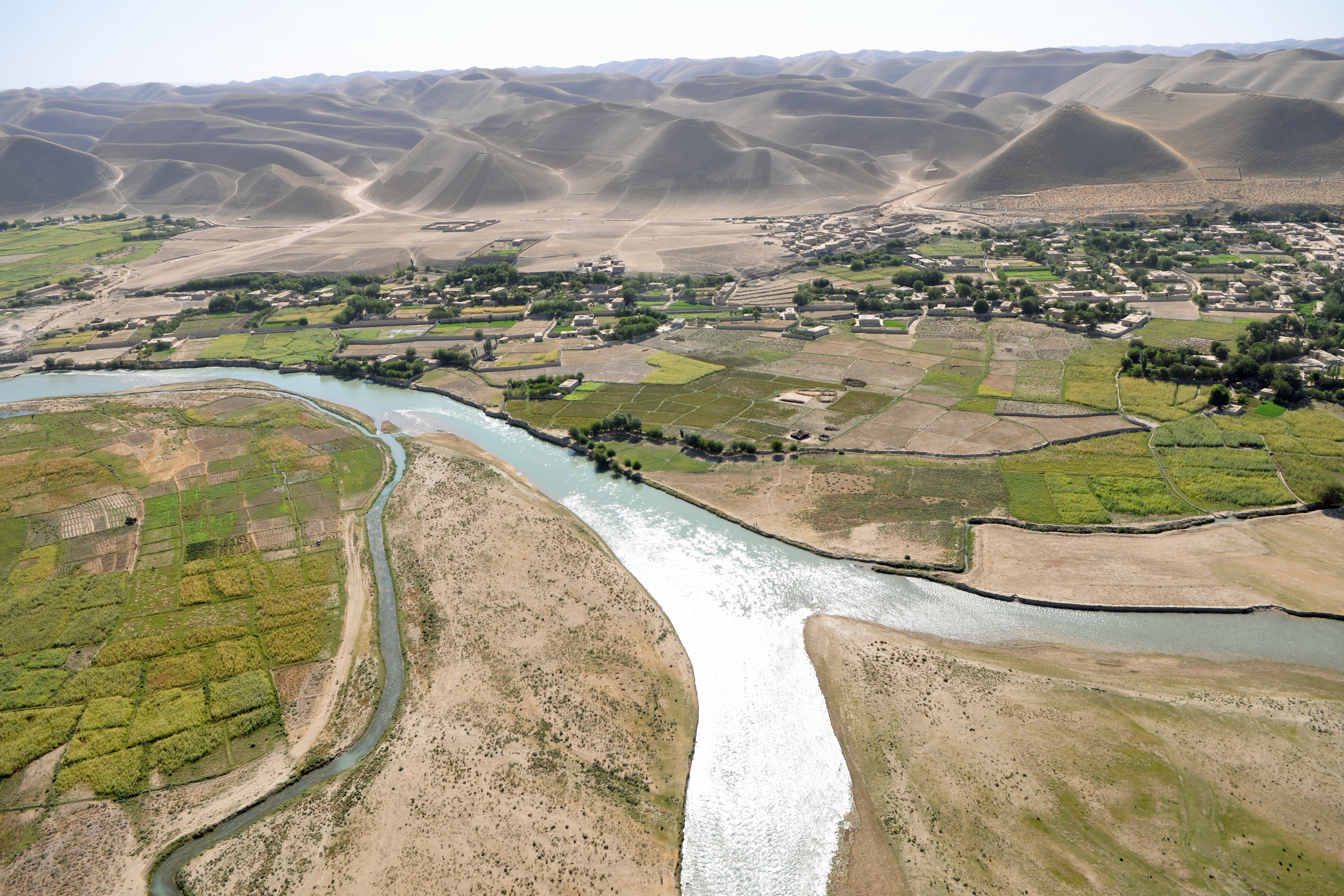
Scenic view in western Afghanistan

This is a list of rivers that flow wholly or partly in Afghanistan, arranged geographically by river basin.

== Flowing into the Arabian Sea ==
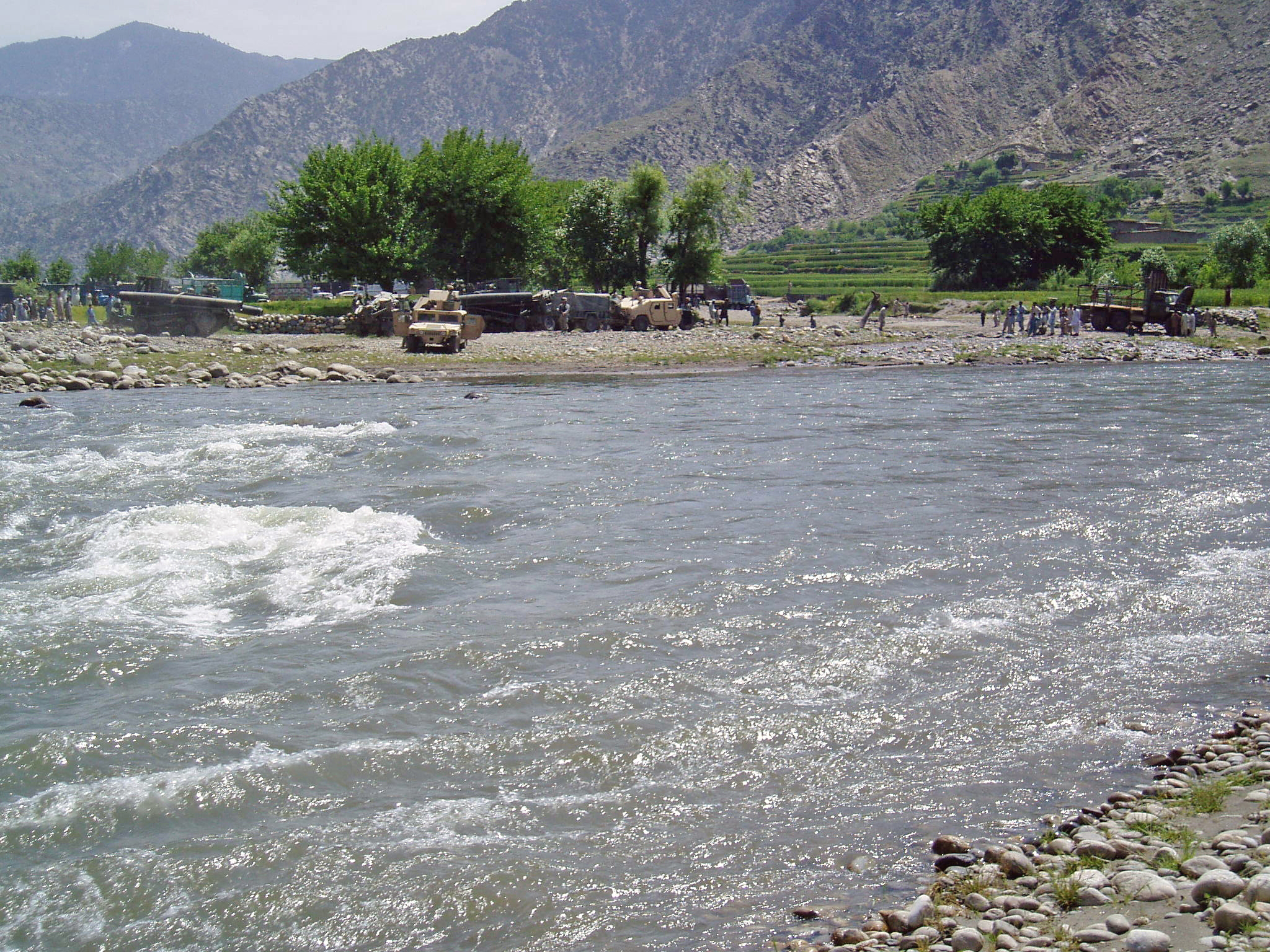
Pech River in eastern Afghanistan.

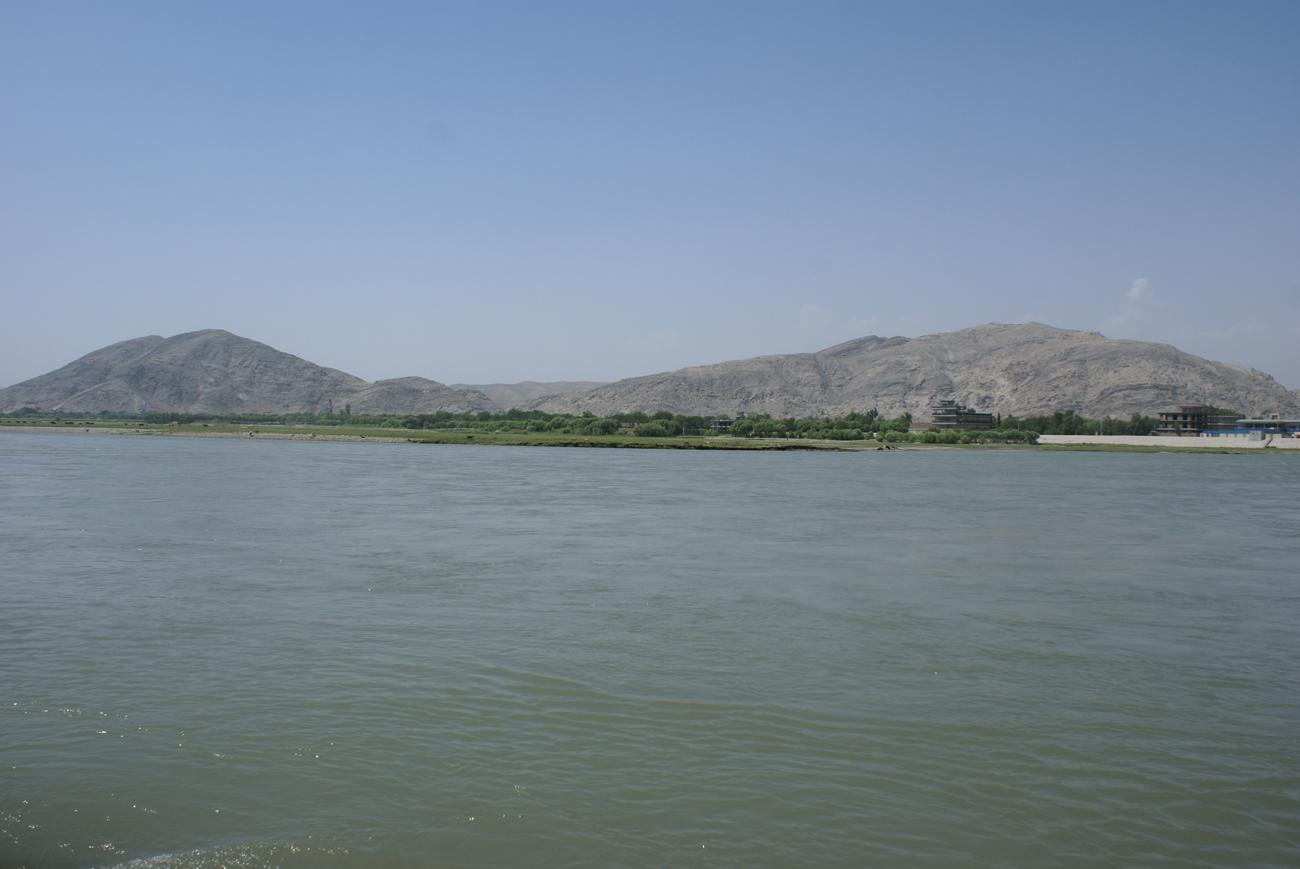
The Kabul River, seen here near Jalalabad

- Indus River (Pakistan)
  - Gomal River
    - Kundar River
    - Zhob River
  - Kurram River
  - Kabul River
    - Bara River
    - Kunar River
      - Pech River
      - Landai Sin River
    - Surkhab
    - Alingar River
    - Panjshir River
      - Ghorband River
        - Salang River
    - Logar River

== Flowing into endorheic basins ==
=== Sistan Basin ===
- Harut River (or Ardaskan River)
- Farah River
- Helmand River
  - Khash River
  - Arghandab River
    - Dori River
      - Tarnak River
      - Arghistan River
        - Lora River
  - Musa Qala River
  - Tirin River
  - Kaj River

=== Ab-i Istada ===
- Ghazni River
  - Jilga River

=== Karakum Desert ===
- Harirud
  - Jam River
- Murghab River
  - Kushk River
  - Kashkan River

=== Aral Sea basin ===
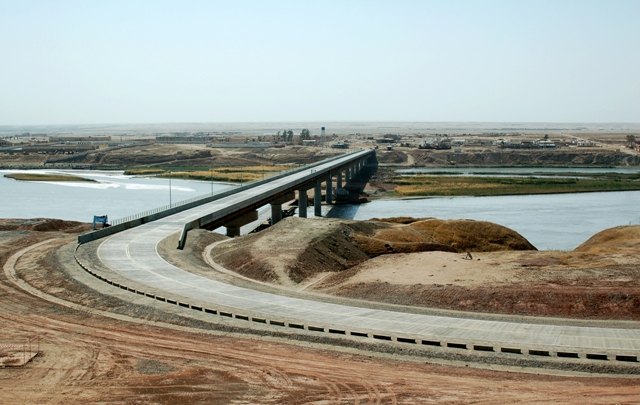
Afghanistan-Tajikistan bridge over the Amu Darya river in 2007.

- Amu Darya
  - Sari Pul River, no longer reaches the Amu Darya
  - Balkh River, no longer reaches the Amu Darya
  - Khulm River (formerly Tashkurgan River), no longer reaches the Amu Darya
  - Kunduz River (or Surkhab River)
    - Khanabad River
    - Andarab
    - Bamiyan River
  - Kokcha River
    - Anjuman
  - Panj River
    - Aksu (Bartang)
    - Pamir River
    - Wakhan River
  - Shirin Tagab River, no longer reaches the Amu Darya
    - Shor Darya River

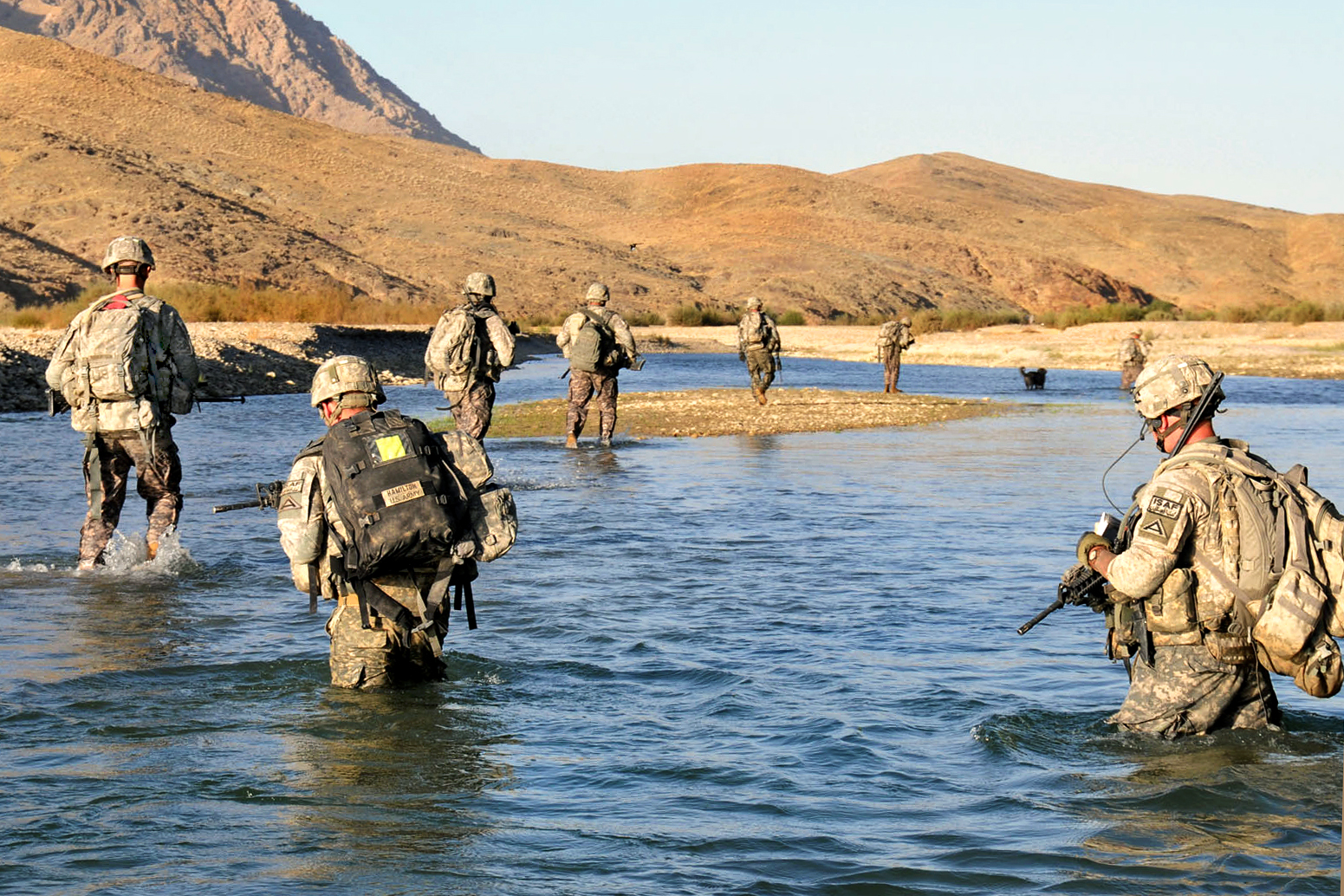

== See also ==
- List of dams and reservoirs in Afghanistan
- Water supply in Afghanistan
