= Geography of Afghanistan =

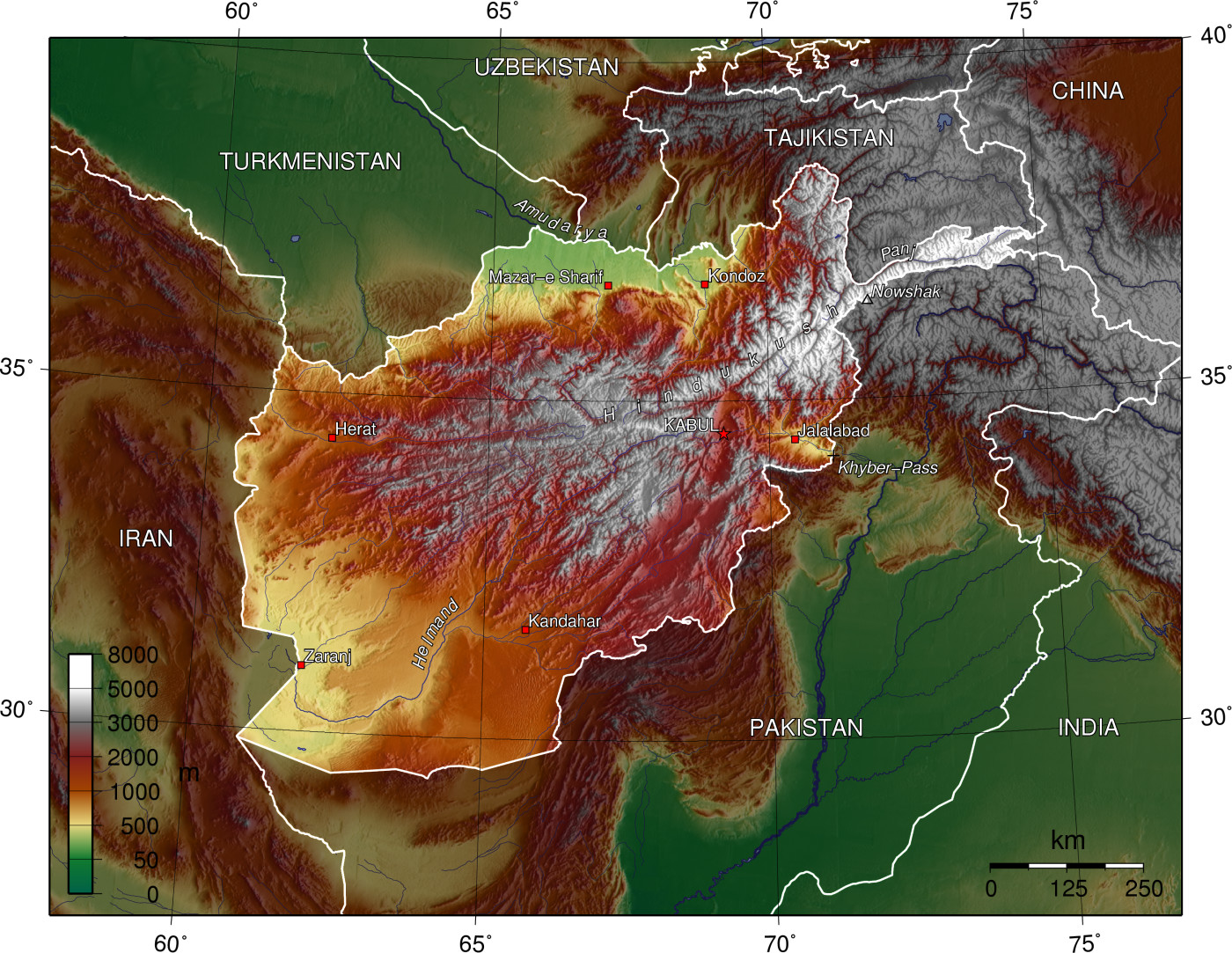
- Continent: Asia
- Region: Central Asia / South Asia (Heart of Asia)
- Coordinates: 33°00′N 65°00′E
- Area: Ranked 40th
  - Total: 652,864 km^{2} (252,072 sq mi)
- Coastline: 0 km (0 mi)
- Borders: Pakistan 2,670 km (1,660 mi), Tajikistan 1,357 km (843 mi), Iran 921 km (572 mi), Turkmenistan 804 km (500 mi), Uzbekistan 144 km (89 mi), China 91 km (57 mi)
- Highest point: Noshaq, 7,492 m (24,580 ft)
- Lowest point: Amu Darya at Khamyab, 258 m (846 ft)
- Longest river: Helmand River
- Largest lake: Kamal Khan Dam; Kajaki Dam; Dahla Dam; Naghlu Dam; Band-e Amir; Qargha
- Climate: Arid to semiarid; cold winters and hot summers
- Terrain: mostly low plateau with deserts, rangelands and a fertile plain in the southeast
- Natural resources: natural gas, petroleum, coal, copper, chromite, talc, barites, sulfur, lead, zinc, iron ore, salt, precious and semiprecious stone
- Natural hazards: earthquakes, flooding, avalanches
- Environmental issues: limited fresh water, soil degradation, overgrazing, deforestation, desertification, air pollution, water pollution

Afghanistan is a landlocked mountainous country located on the Iranian Plateau, at the crossroads of Central Asia and South Asia. The country is the 40th largest in the world in size. Kabul is the capital and largest city of Afghanistan, located in the middle of Kabul Province. With a location at the intersection of major trade routes, Afghanistan has attracted a succession of invaders since the sixth century BC.

Afghanistan contains most of the Hindu Kush. There are a number of major rivers in the country, including Amu Darya, Arghandab, Farah, Gambila, Hari, Helmand, Kabul, Kokcha, Kunar, Kunduz, and Panj. The country also possesses many smaller rivers as well as streams, canals, lakes, ponds, and springs. Most of its fresh water historically flowed into neighboring countries.

== Area and boundaries ==
Area
- total: 652,864 km^{2} (252,072 sq mi)
  - country rank in the world: 40th
- land: 652,230 km^{2} (251,830 sq mi)
- water: 630 km^{2} (240 sq mi)

Area — comparative
- Australia comparative: approximately 2/3 the size of South Australia
- Canada comparative: approximately the size of Saskatchewan
- United Kingdom comparative: approximately 2 2/3 times the size of the United Kingdom
- United States comparative: about nine percent smaller than the state of Texas
- EU comparative: slightly larger than France

Land boundaries
- total: 5,987 km (3,720 mi)
  - border countries: Pakistan 2,670 km (1,660 mi), Tajikistan 1,357 km (843 mi), Iran 921 km (572 mi), Turkmenistan 804 km (500 mi), Uzbekistan 144 km (89 mi), China 91 km (57 mi)

Coastline
- 0 km

Maritime claims
none (landlocked)

== Mountain systems ==
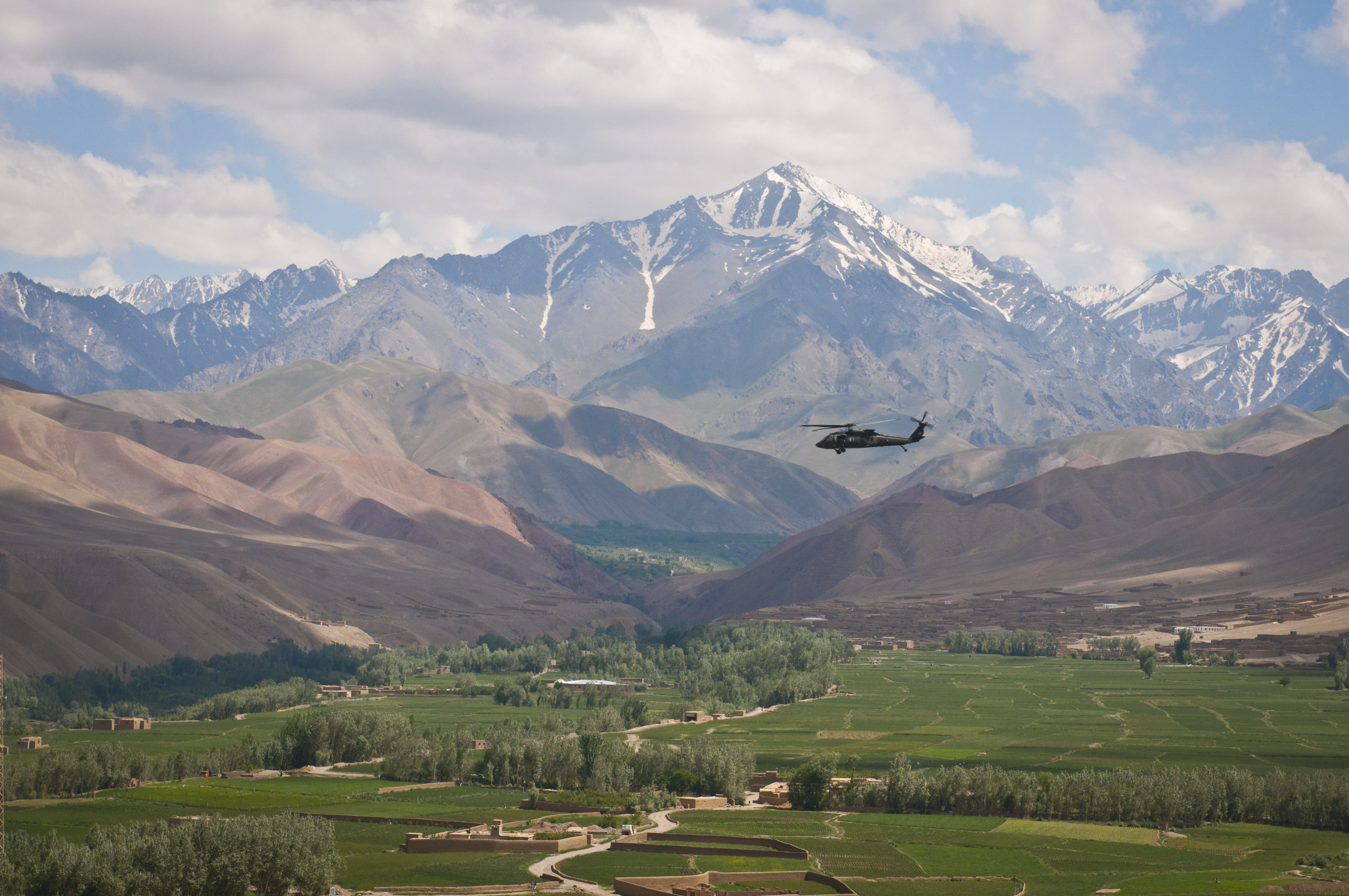
Snow-covered Koh-i-Baba mountains in Bamyan Province

The Hindu Kush mountain range reaches a height of 7,492 m (24,580 ft) at Noshaq, Afghanistan's highest peak. Of the ranges extending southwestward from the Hindu Kush, the Foladi peak (Shah Foladi) of the Baba mountain range (Koh-i-Baba) reaches the greatest height: 5,142 m (16,870 ft). The Safed Koh range, which includes the Tora Bora area, dominates the border area southeast of Kabul.

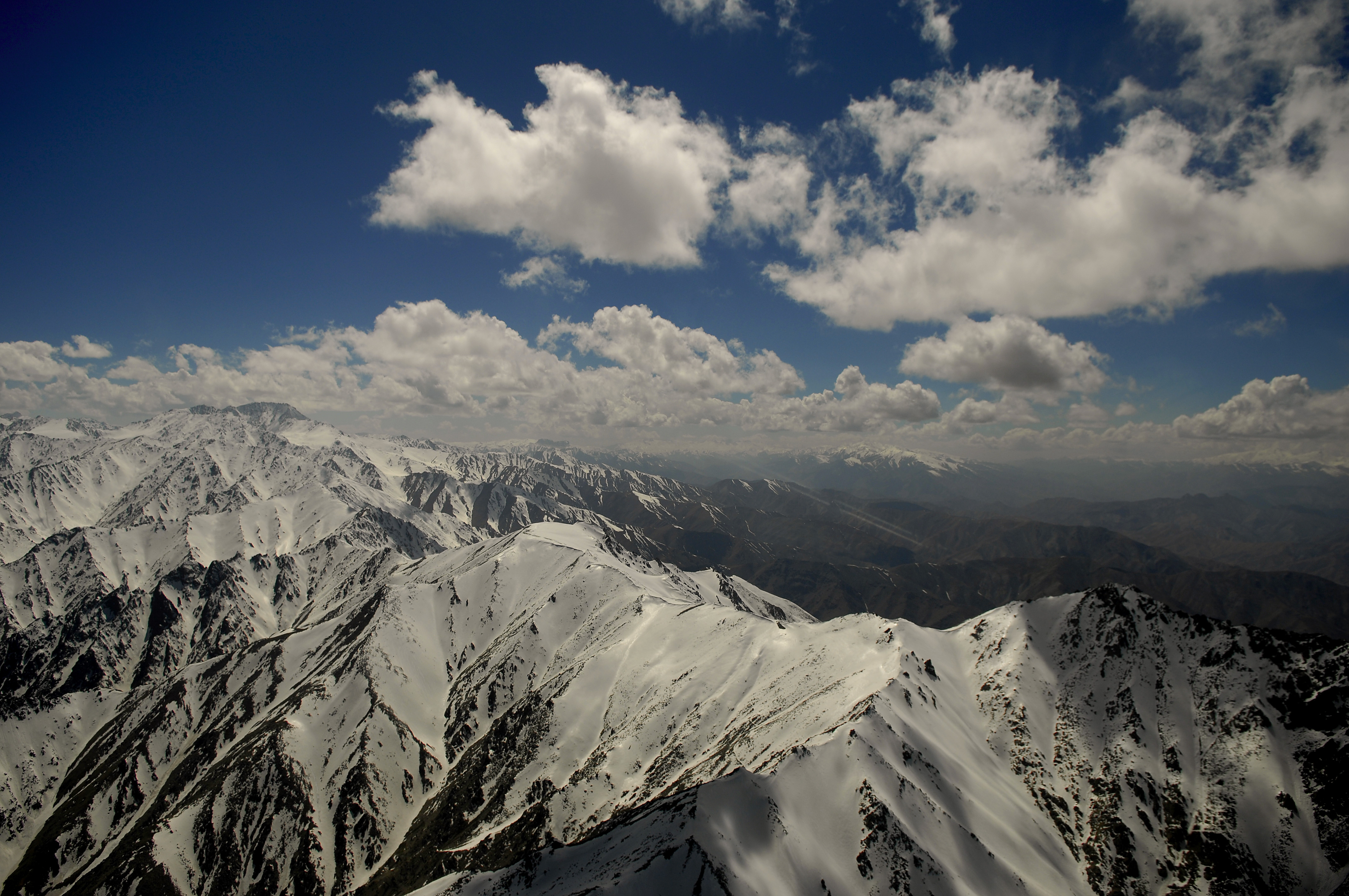
Snow-covered Hindu Kush mountains in Afghanistan

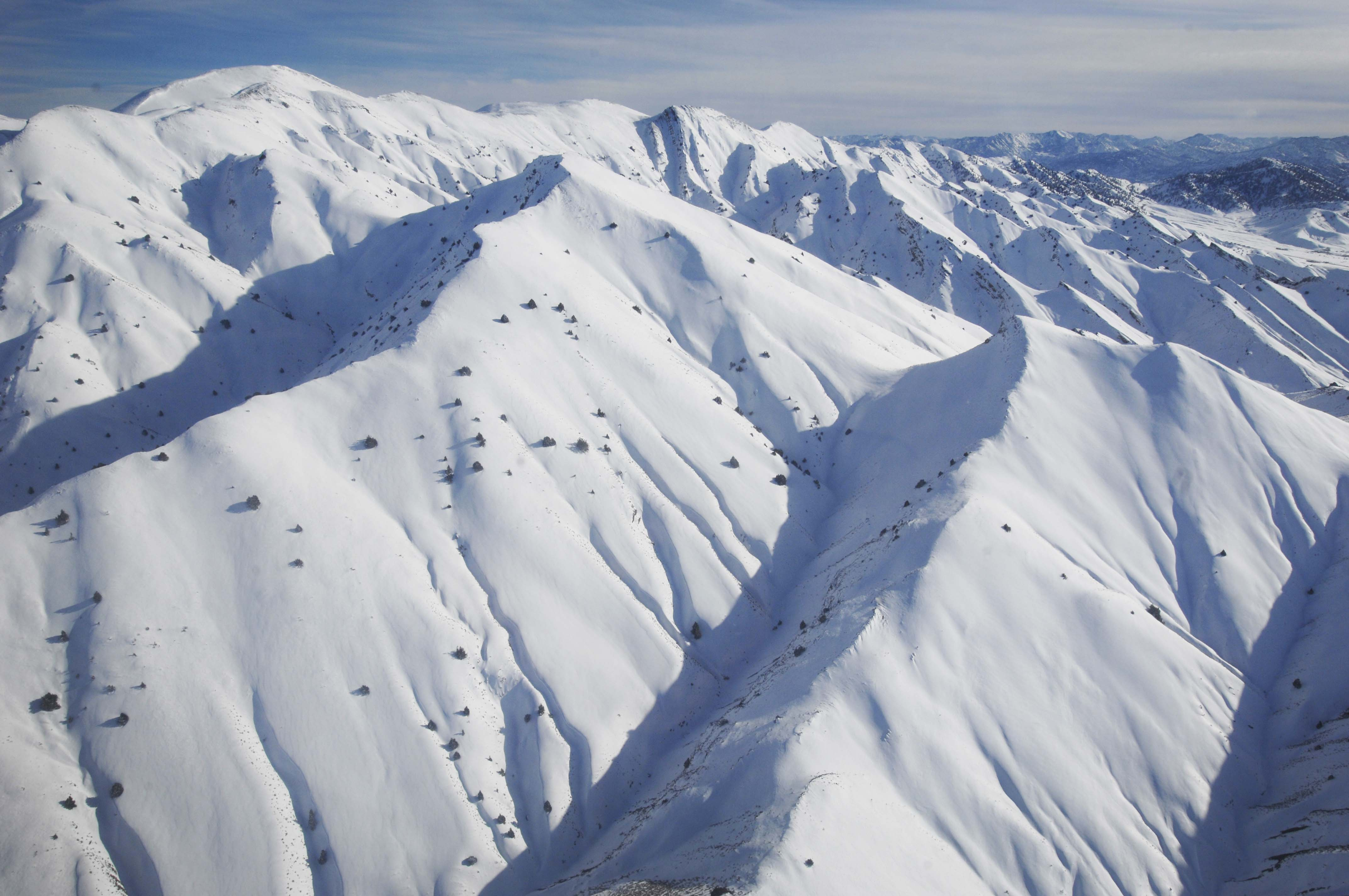
Snow-covered mountains in Paktia Province

Important passes include the Unai Pass across the Safed Koh, the Kushan and Salang Passes through the Hindu Kush, and the Khyber Pass that connects Afghanistan with Pakistan. The summit of the Khyber Pass at 1,070 m (3,510 ft) at Landi Kotal, Pakistan is 5 km (3 mi) east of the border town of Torkham. Other key passages through the mountainous Pakistan border include two from Paktika Province into Pakistan's Waziristan region: one at Angoor Ada, and one further south at the Gumal River crossing, plus the Charkai River passage south of Khost, Afghanistan, at Pakistan's Ghulam Khan village into North Waziristan. The busy Pakistan-Afghan border crossing at Wesh, Afghanistan is in a flat and dry area, though this route involves Pakistan's Khojak Pass at 2,707 m (8,881 ft) just 14 km (9 mi) from the border. The border connects Kandahar and Spin Boldak in Afghanistan with Quetta in Pakistan.

The Wakhan Corridor in the northeast lies eastward of the province of Panjshir, between the Hindu Kush and the Pamir Mountains, which leads to the Wakhjir Pass into Xinjiang in China. In Kabul, and over all the northern part of the country to the descent at Gandamak, winter is rigorous, especially so on the high Arachosian plateau.

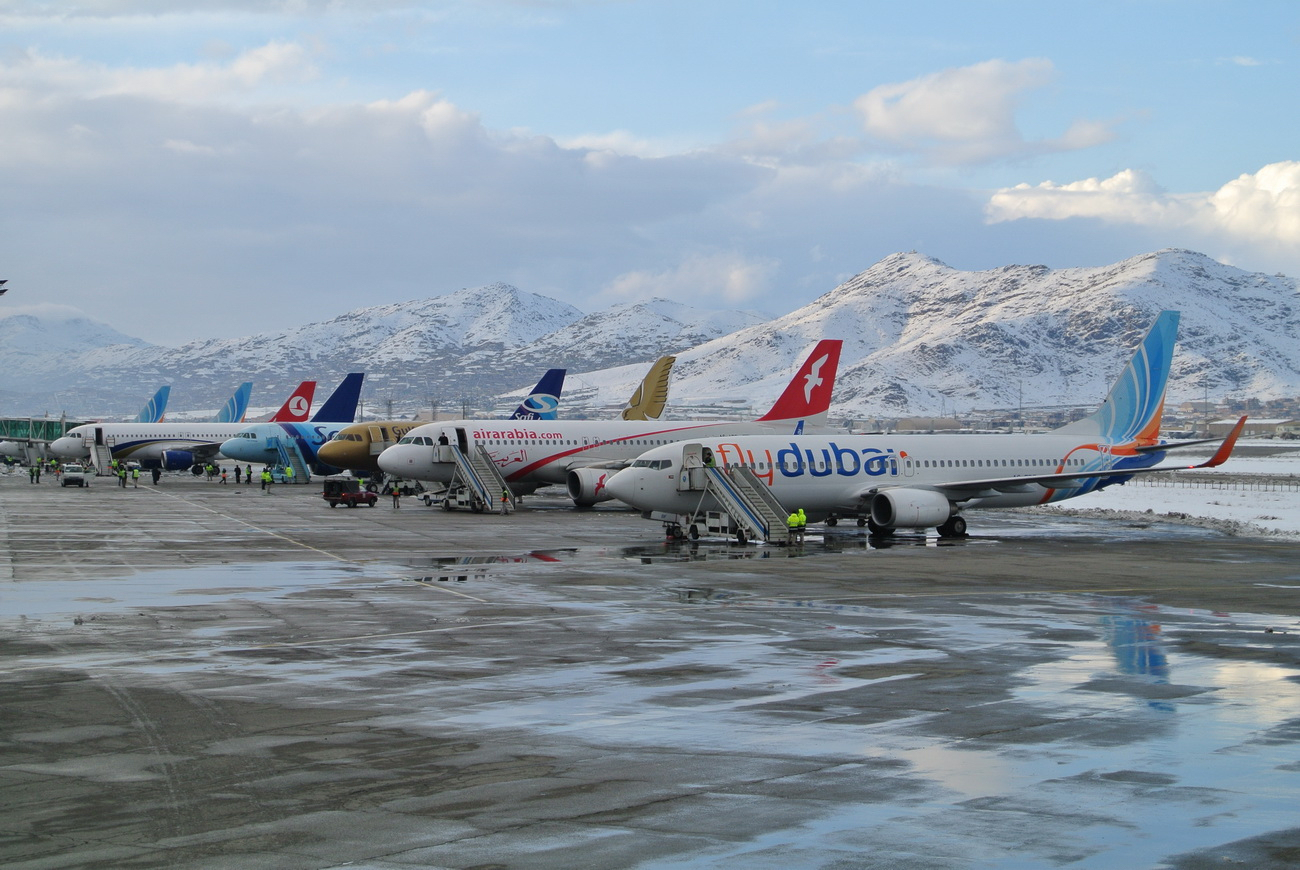
Airport and mountains in Kabul, Afghanistan

Although Herat is approximately 240 m (787 ft) lower than Kandahar, the summer climate there is more temperate along with the yearly climate. From May to September, the wind blows from the northwest with great force, and this extends across the country to Kandahar. The winter is mild; snow melts as it falls, and even on the mountains does not lie long. Three years out of four at Herat it does not freeze hard enough for the people to store ice. Yet, it was not very far from Herat, in Rafir Kala, in 1750, where Ahmad Shah's army, retreating from Persia, is said to have lost 18,000 men from cold in a single night. In the northern Herat districts records of the coldest month (February) show the mean minimum as −8 °C (18 °F) and the maximum as 3 °C (37 °F). The eastern reaches of the Hari River, including the rapids, are frozen hard in the winter, and people travel on it as on a road.

== Climate ==
Köppen–Geiger climate classification map at 1-km resolution for Afghanistan 1991–2020

The Afghan climate is very dry. Rainfall in Afghanistan is very scarce, and mainly only affects the northern highlands, arriving in March and April. Rainfall in the more arid lowlands is rare, and can be very unpredictable. The climate is characterized by great differences of summer and winter temperature and of day and night temperature, as well as the extent to which change of climate can be attained by slight change of place. The sun shines for three-fourths of the year, and the nights are clearer than the days.

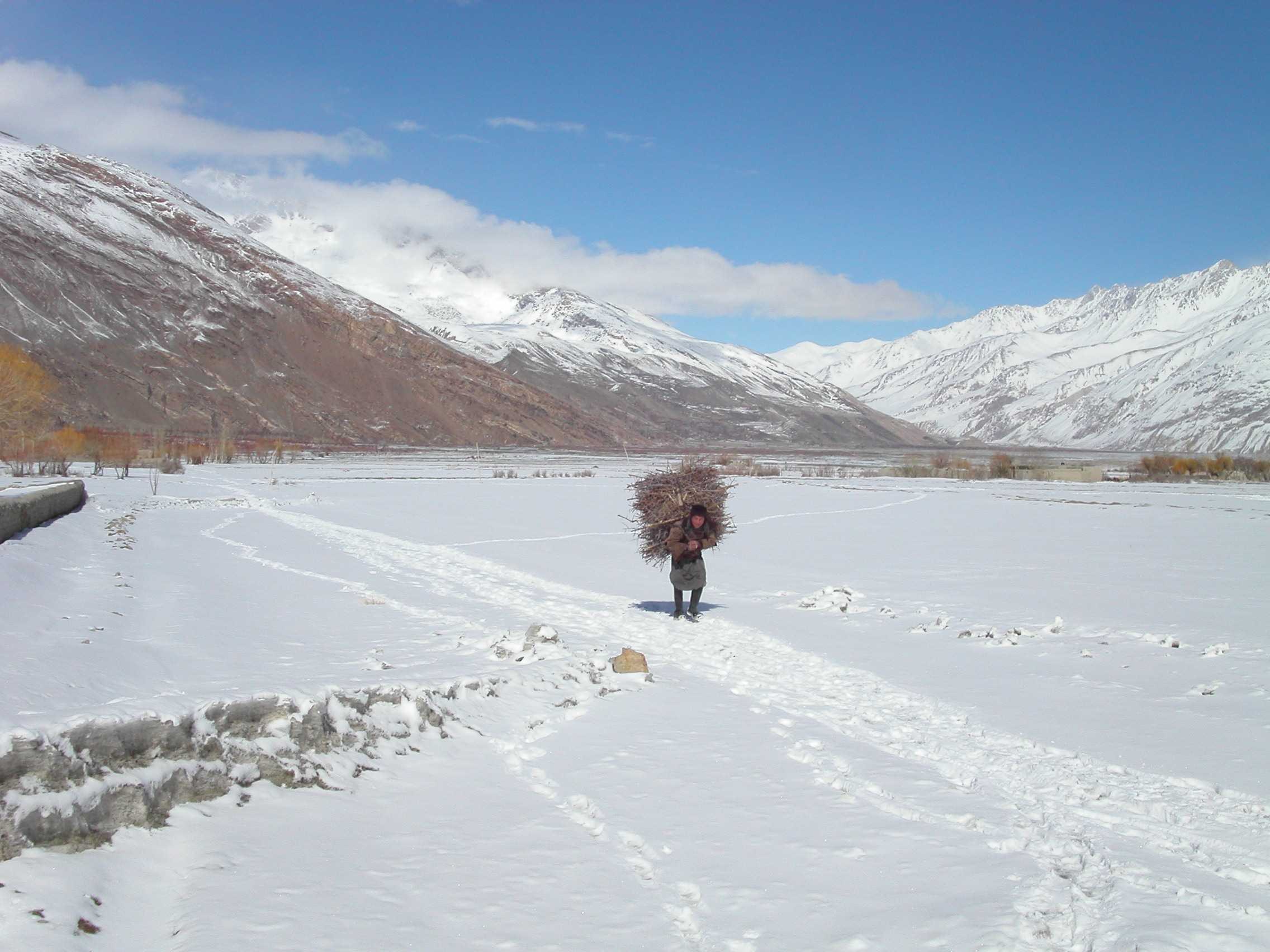
The Wakhan District of Badakhshan Province

The mean temperature of the highlands of Afghanistan are similar to that of the lower Himalaya. However, a feature of the Afghan climate is its extreme temperature range within limited periods. The smallest daily range in the north is when the weather is cold; the greatest is when it is hot. From May to November this range exceeds 17 °C (31 °F) daily. Waves of intense cold occur, lasting for several days, with temperatures of −24 °C (−11 °F), rising to a maximum of −8 °C (18 °F). At Ghazni the snow has been known to stay long beyond the vernal equinox; the temperatures sink as low as −25 °C (−13 °F). Oral tradition tells of the destruction of the entire population of Ghazni by snowstorms on more than one occasion. The summer temperature is exceedingly high, especially in the Oxus regions, where a shade maximum of 45–50 °C (113–122 °F) is not uncommon.

The summer heat is strong in the Sistan Basin, Jalalabad and Turkestan. The simoom wind occurs in Kandahar province during the summer. The hot season is rendered more intense by frequent dust storms and strong winds; whilst the bare rocky ridges that traverse the country absorb heat by day and radiate it by night. In Kabul the heat is tempered occasionally by cool breezes from the Hindu Kush, and the nights are usually cool. In Kandahar snow seldom falls on the plains or lower hills; when it does, it melts at once.

The combination of hot summers and bitterly cold winters has been noted comparable to the U.S. state of Wyoming.

The summer rains that accompany the southwest monsoon in India move along the southern slopes of the Himalaya and travel up the Kabul valley as far as Laghman, though they are more clearly felt in Bajour and Panjkora, under the Hindu Kush, and in the eastern branches of Safed Koh. Rain also falls at the head of Kurram valley in summer. South of this the Suliman mountains are the western limit of the monsoons. The spring rain, though less frequent, is more important to agriculture than the winter rain, unless the latter falls in the form of snow. In the absence of monsoon influences there are steadier weather indications than in India. The north-west blizzards which occur in winter and spring are the most noticeable feature, and their influence is clearly felt on the border with Pakistan.

=== Examples ===
Climate data for Kabul (1956–1983)
Month	Jan	Feb	Mar	Apr	May	Jun	Jul	Aug	Sep	Oct	Nov	Dec	Year
Record high °C (°F)	18.8 (65.8)	18.4 (65.1)	26.7 (80.1)	28.7 (83.7)	33.5 (92.3)	36.8 (98.2)	37.8 (100.0)	37.3 (99.1)	35.1 (95.2)	31.6 (88.9)	24.4 (75.9)	20.4 (68.7)	37.8 (100.0)
Mean daily maximum °C (°F)	4.5 (40.1)	5.5 (41.9)	12.5 (54.5)	19.2 (66.6)	24.4 (75.9)	30.2 (86.4)	32.1 (89.8)	32.0 (89.6)	28.5 (83.3)	22.4 (72.3)	15.0 (59.0)	8.3 (46.9)	19.5 (67.1)
Daily mean °C (°F)	−2.3 (27.9)	−0.7 (30.7)	6.3 (43.3)	12.8 (55.0)	17.3 (63.1)	22.8 (73.0)	25.0 (77.0)	24.1 (75.4)	19.7 (67.5)	13.1 (55.6)	5.9 (42.6)	0.6 (33.1)	12.1 (53.8)
Mean daily minimum °C (°F)	−7.1 (19.2)	−5.7 (21.7)	0.7 (33.3)	6.0 (42.8)	8.8 (47.8)	12.4 (54.3)	15.3 (59.5)	14.3 (57.7)	9.4 (48.9)	3.9 (39.0)	−1.2 (29.8)	−4.7 (23.5)	4.3 (39.7)
Record low °C (°F)	−25.5 (−13.9)	−24.8 (−12.6)	−12.6 (9.3)	−2.1 (28.2)	0.4 (32.7)	3.1 (37.6)	7.5 (45.5)	6.0 (42.8)	1.0 (33.8)	−3.0 (26.6)	−9.4 (15.1)	−18.9 (−2.0)	−25.5 (−13.9)
Average precipitation mm (inches)	34.3 (1.35)	60.1 (2.37)	67.9 (2.67)	71.9 (2.83)	23.4 (0.92)	1.0 (0.04)	6.2 (0.24)	1.6 (0.06)	1.7 (0.07)	3.7 (0.15)	18.6 (0.73)	21.6 (0.85)	312.0 (12.28)
Average rainy days	2	3	10	11	8	1	2	1	1	2	4	3	48
Average snowy days	7	6	3	0	0	0	0	0	0	0	0	4	20
Average relative humidity (%)	68	70	65	61	48	36	37	38	39	42	52	63	52
Mean monthly sunshine hours	177.2	178.6	204.5	232.5	310.3	353.4	356.8	339.7	303.9	282.6	253.2	182.4	3,175.1
Source: NOAA

Climate data for Jalalabad
Month	Jan	Feb	Mar	Apr	May	Jun	Jul	Aug	Sep	Oct	Nov	Dec	Year
Record high °C (°F)	25.0 (77.0)	28.8 (83.8)	34.5 (94.1)	40.5 (104.9)	45.4 (113.7)	47.5 (117.5)	44.7 (112.5)	42.4 (108.3)	41.2 (106.2)	38.2 (100.8)	32.4 (90.3)	25.4 (77.7)	47.5 (117.5)
Mean daily maximum °C (°F)	15.9 (60.6)	17.9 (64.2)	22.5 (72.5)	28.3 (82.9)	34.7 (94.5)	40.4 (104.7)	39.3 (102.7)	38.0 (100.4)	35.2 (95.4)	30.5 (86.9)	23.3 (73.9)	17.5 (63.5)	28.6 (83.5)
Daily mean °C (°F)	8.5 (47.3)	10.9 (51.6)	16.3 (61.3)	21.9 (71.4)	27.7 (81.9)	32.7 (90.9)	32.8 (91.0)	31.9 (89.4)	28.1 (82.6)	22.2 (72.0)	14.9 (58.8)	9.5 (49.1)	21.5 (70.6)
Mean daily minimum °C (°F)	2.9 (37.2)	5.6 (42.1)	10.5 (50.9)	15.3 (59.5)	19.8 (67.6)	24.7 (76.5)	26.7 (80.1)	26.2 (79.2)	21.4 (70.5)	14.4 (57.9)	6.9 (44.4)	3.5 (38.3)	14.8 (58.7)
Record low °C (°F)	−14.1 (6.6)	−9.5 (14.9)	−1.0 (30.2)	6.1 (43.0)	10.6 (51.1)	13.5 (56.3)	19.0 (66.2)	17.5 (63.5)	11.0 (51.8)	2.7 (36.9)	−4.5 (23.9)	−5.5 (22.1)	−14.1 (6.6)
Average precipitation mm (inches)	18.1 (0.71)	24.3 (0.96)	39.2 (1.54)	36.4 (1.43)	16.0 (0.63)	1.4 (0.06)	6.9 (0.27)	7.7 (0.30)	8.3 (0.33)	3.2 (0.13)	8.3 (0.33)	12.1 (0.48)	181.9 (7.17)
Average rainy days	4	5	8	8	4	1	1	1	1	1	2	3	39
Average relative humidity (%)	61	60	62	59	47	40	52	58	56	55	58	63	56
Mean monthly sunshine hours	180.9	182.7	207.1	227.8	304.8	339.6	325.9	299.7	293.6	277.6	231.0	185.6	3,056.3
Source: NOAA (1964-1983)

Climate data for Herāt
Month	Jan	Feb	Mar	Apr	May	Jun	Jul	Aug	Sep	Oct	Nov	Dec	Year
Record high °C (°F)	24.4 (75.9)	27.6 (81.7)	31.0 (87.8)	37.8 (100.0)	39.7 (103.5)	44.6 (112.3)	50.7 (123.3)	42.7 (108.9)	39.3 (102.7)	37.0 (98.6)	30.0 (86.0)	26.5 (79.7)	50.7 (123.3)
Mean daily maximum °C (°F)	9.1 (48.4)	11.9 (53.4)	17.9 (64.2)	24.0 (75.2)	29.6 (85.3)	35.0 (95.0)	36.7 (98.1)	35.1 (95.2)	31.4 (88.5)	25.0 (77.0)	17.8 (64.0)	12.0 (53.6)	23.8 (74.8)
Daily mean °C (°F)	2.9 (37.2)	5.5 (41.9)	10.2 (50.4)	16.3 (61.3)	22.1 (71.8)	27.2 (81.0)	29.8 (85.6)	28.0 (82.4)	22.9 (73.2)	16.1 (61.0)	8.8 (47.8)	4.7 (40.5)	16.2 (61.2)
Mean daily minimum °C (°F)	−2.9 (26.8)	−0.6 (30.9)	3.8 (38.8)	9.1 (48.4)	13.3 (55.9)	18.2 (64.8)	21.2 (70.2)	19.2 (66.6)	13.2 (55.8)	7.4 (45.3)	1.0 (33.8)	−1.4 (29.5)	8.5 (47.2)
Record low °C (°F)	−26.7 (−16.1)	−20.5 (−4.9)	−13.3 (8.1)	−2.3 (27.9)	0.8 (33.4)	9.7 (49.5)	13.3 (55.9)	8.4 (47.1)	1.3 (34.3)	−5.6 (21.9)	−12.8 (9.0)	−22.7 (−8.9)	−26.7 (−16.1)
Average precipitation mm (inches)	51.6 (2.03)	44.8 (1.76)	55.1 (2.17)	29.2 (1.15)	9.8 (0.39)	0.0 (0.0)	0.0 (0.0)	0.0 (0.0)	0.0 (0.0)	1.7 (0.07)	10.9 (0.43)	35.8 (1.41)	238.9 (9.41)
Average rainy days	6	8	8	7	2	0	0	0	0	1	3	5	40
Average snowy days	2	2	1	0	0	0	0	0	0	0	0	1	6
Average relative humidity (%)	72	69	62	56	45	34	30	30	34	42	55	67	50
Mean monthly sunshine hours	149.3	153.5	202.5	235.7	329.6	362.6	378.6	344.8	323.2	274.0	235.0	143.1	3,131.9
Source 1: NOAA (1959–1983)
Source 2: Ogimet

Climate data for Kandahar (1964–1983)
Month	Jan	Feb	Mar	Apr	May	Jun	Jul	Aug	Sep	Oct	Nov	Dec	Year
Record high °C (°F)	25.0 (77.0)	26.0 (78.8)	36.5 (97.7)	37.1 (98.8)	43.0 (109.4)	45.0 (113.0)	46.5 (115.7)	44.5 (112.1)	41.0 (105.8)	37.5 (99.5)	31.5 (88.7)	26.0 (78.8)	46.5 (115.7)
Mean daily maximum °C (°F)	12.2 (54.0)	14.8 (58.6)	21.6 (70.9)	28.1 (82.6)	34.1 (93.4)	39.1 (102.4)	40.2 (104.4)	38.2 (100.8)	34.0 (93.2)	27.5 (81.5)	21.0 (69.8)	15.4 (59.7)	27.2 (81.0)
Daily mean °C (°F)	5.1 (41.2)	7.8 (46.0)	13.9 (57.0)	20.2 (68.4)	25.4 (77.7)	30.0 (86.0)	31.9 (89.4)	29.4 (84.9)	23.5 (74.3)	17.5 (63.5)	11.0 (51.8)	7.3 (45.1)	18.6 (65.4)
Mean daily minimum °C (°F)	0.0 (32.0)	2.4 (36.3)	7.1 (44.8)	12.3 (54.1)	15.8 (60.4)	19.5 (67.1)	22.5 (72.5)	20.0 (68.0)	13.5 (56.3)	8.5 (47.3)	3.3 (37.9)	1.0 (33.8)	10.5 (50.9)
Record low °C (°F)	−12.1 (10.2)	−10.0 (14.0)	−4.8 (23.4)	2.0 (35.6)	2.4 (36.3)	8.5 (47.3)	13.5 (56.3)	9.0 (48.2)	5.2 (41.4)	−2.2 (28.0)	−9.3 (15.3)	−11.4 (11.5)	−12.1 (10.2)
Average precipitation mm (inches)	54.0 (2.13)	42.0 (1.65)	41.1 (1.62)	18.7 (0.74)	2.2 (0.09)	0 (0)	2.3 (0.09)	1.0 (0.04)	0 (0)	2.3 (0.09)	7.0 (0.28)	20.0 (0.79)	190.6 (7.52)
Average precipitation days	6	6	6	4	1	0	0	0	0	1	2	3	29
Average relative humidity (%)	58	59	50	41	30	23	25	25	24	29	40	52	38
Mean monthly sunshine hours	198.4	183.6	235.6	255.0	347.2	369.0	341.0	337.9	324.0	306.9	264.0	217.0	3,379.6
Source: NOAA (1964–1983)

Climate data for Zaranj
Month	Jan	Feb	Mar	Apr	May	Jun	Jul	Aug	Sep	Oct	Nov	Dec	Year
Record high °C (°F)	24.1 (75.4)	30.6 (87.1)	37.0 (98.6)	45.0 (113.0)	51.0 (123.8)	49.7 (121.5)	49.3 (120.7)	50.0 (122.0)	49.7 (121.5)	42.0 (107.6)	36.0 (96.8)	27.8 (82.0)	51.0 (123.8)
Mean daily maximum °C (°F)	14.3 (57.7)	18.7 (65.7)	25.0 (77.0)	32.6 (90.7)	37.3 (99.1)	42.8 (109.0)	42.5 (108.5)	41.3 (106.3)	37.0 (98.6)	31.2 (88.2)	23.1 (73.6)	17.7 (63.9)	30.3 (86.5)
Daily mean °C (°F)	6.5 (43.7)	10.0 (50.0)	15.7 (60.3)	23.3 (73.9)	29.1 (84.4)	33.4 (92.1)	35.0 (95.0)	32.3 (90.1)	27.2 (81.0)	21.9 (71.4)	13.1 (55.6)	8.7 (47.7)	21.3 (70.4)
Mean daily minimum °C (°F)	0.1 (32.2)	2.9 (37.2)	7.7 (45.9)	14.7 (58.5)	20.0 (68.0)	25.2 (77.4)	27.3 (81.1)	24.9 (76.8)	18.5 (65.3)	12.3 (54.1)	4.8 (40.6)	0.7 (33.3)	13.3 (55.9)
Record low °C (°F)	−13.2 (8.2)	−8.2 (17.2)	−5.2 (22.6)	1.0 (33.8)	5.0 (41.0)	16.0 (60.8)	18.4 (65.1)	13.2 (55.8)	3.9 (39.0)	−2.7 (27.1)	−7.1 (19.2)	−8.8 (16.2)	−13.2 (8.2)
Average precipitation mm (inches)	19.7 (0.78)	9.9 (0.39)	11.2 (0.44)	2.4 (0.09)	0.6 (0.02)	0.0 (0.0)	0.0 (0.0)	0.0 (0.0)	0.0 (0.0)	1.2 (0.05)	1.4 (0.06)	5.1 (0.20)	51.5 (2.03)
Average rainy days	3	2	2	2	0	0	0	0	0	0	1	1	11
Average relative humidity (%)	55	50	44	40	35	29	28	29	33	41	49	54	41
Source: NOAA (1969-1983)

Climate data for Mazar-i-Sharif
Month	Jan	Feb	Mar	Apr	May	Jun	Jul	Aug	Sep	Oct	Nov	Dec	Year
Record high °C (°F)	24.0 (75.2)	28.6 (83.5)	32.4 (90.3)	37.8 (100.0)	43.0 (109.4)	45.6 (114.1)	48.1 (118.6)	46.0 (114.8)	39.5 (103.1)	37.0 (98.6)	29.8 (85.6)	24.4 (75.9)	48.1 (118.6)
Mean daily maximum °C (°F)	8.0 (46.4)	10.7 (51.3)	16.3 (61.3)	24.3 (75.7)	31.2 (88.2)	37.0 (98.6)	38.9 (102.0)	36.9 (98.4)	31.9 (89.4)	24.7 (76.5)	16.4 (61.5)	10.8 (51.4)	23.9 (75.1)
Daily mean °C (°F)	2.6 (36.7)	5.1 (41.2)	10.8 (51.4)	17.9 (64.2)	24.5 (76.1)	29.9 (85.8)	33.3 (91.9)	29.9 (85.8)	23.9 (75.0)	16.7 (62.1)	9.1 (48.4)	5.1 (41.2)	17.4 (63.3)
Mean daily minimum °C (°F)	−2.1 (28.2)	0.0 (32.0)	5.1 (41.2)	11.3 (52.3)	16.6 (61.9)	22.5 (72.5)	25.9 (78.6)	23.8 (74.8)	17.1 (62.8)	9.4 (48.9)	3.2 (37.8)	0.0 (32.0)	11.1 (51.9)
Record low °C (°F)	−22.3 (−8.1)	−24.0 (−11.2)	−6.1 (21.0)	−0.8 (30.6)	1.0 (33.8)	11.4 (52.5)	11.1 (52.0)	13.7 (56.7)	2.6 (36.7)	4.5 (40.1)	−8.7 (16.3)	−15.5 (4.1)	−24.0 (−11.2)
Average precipitation mm (inches)	28.9 (1.14)	34.8 (1.37)	43.8 (1.72)	28.3 (1.11)	11.2 (0.44)	0.2 (0.01)	0.0 (0.0)	0.0 (0.0)	0.1 (0.00)	3.9 (0.15)	13.5 (0.53)	21.7 (0.85)	186.4 (7.32)
Average rainy days	4	7	10	9	4	0	0	0	0	2	4	6	46
Average snowy days	4	3	1	0	0	0	0	0	0	0	0	2	10
Average relative humidity (%)	79	77	72	64	44	27	25	24	28	41	62	75	52
Mean monthly sunshine hours	122.2	118.4	158.1	193.8	299.9	352.9	364.4	332.7	298.2	223.2	173.6	125.5	2,762.9
Source: NOAA (1959–1983)

Climate data for Kunduz
Month	Jan	Feb	Mar	Apr	May	Jun	Jul	Aug	Sep	Oct	Nov	Dec	Year
Record high °C (°F)	21.2 (70.2)	25.0 (77.0)	32.8 (91.0)	38.9 (102.0)	42.2 (108.0)	46.2 (115.2)	45.3 (113.5)	44.2 (111.6)	39.2 (102.6)	39.4 (102.9)	28.4 (83.1)	21.6 (70.9)	46.2 (115.2)
Mean daily maximum °C (°F)	6.3 (43.3)	9.5 (49.1)	15.8 (60.4)	23.0 (73.4)	29.8 (85.6)	37.3 (99.1)	39.0 (102.2)	36.9 (98.4)	31.8 (89.2)	24.5 (76.1)	16.0 (60.8)	9.7 (49.5)	23.3 (73.9)
Daily mean °C (°F)	1.6 (34.9)	4.4 (39.9)	10.4 (50.7)	17.2 (63.0)	22.9 (73.2)	29.3 (84.7)	31.3 (88.3)	29.2 (84.6)	23.9 (75.0)	16.9 (62.4)	9.5 (49.1)	4.4 (39.9)	16.8 (62.1)
Mean daily minimum °C (°F)	−2.4 (27.7)	0.0 (32.0)	5.7 (42.3)	11.6 (52.9)	15.7 (60.3)	20.9 (69.6)	23.3 (73.9)	21.5 (70.7)	16.3 (61.3)	10.6 (51.1)	4.1 (39.4)	0.0 (32.0)	10.6 (51.1)
Record low °C (°F)	−22.7 (−8.9)	−23.1 (−9.6)	−11.8 (10.8)	−2.1 (28.2)	4.2 (39.6)	12.5 (54.5)	15.7 (60.3)	12.6 (54.7)	3.5 (38.3)	−2.0 (28.4)	−9.8 (14.4)	−20 (−4)	−23.1 (−9.6)
Average precipitation mm (inches)	44.0 (1.73)	56.5 (2.22)	76.7 (3.02)	54.4 (2.14)	29.8 (1.17)	0.1 (0.00)	1.3 (0.05)	0.3 (0.01)	0.1 (0.00)	7.3 (0.29)	23.7 (0.93)	28.4 (1.12)	322.6 (12.68)
Average rainy days	5	6	11	10	9	1	1	0	0	3	5	6	57
Average snowy days	5	4	2	0	0	0	0	0	0	0	1	2	14
Average relative humidity (%)	80	75	75	71	54	31	28	29	32	44	63	76	55
Mean monthly sunshine hours	114.4	114.6	158.9	201.0	276.5	332.1	340.2	315.5	289.7	221.8	169.3	118.3	2,652.3
Source: NOAA (1958-1983)

== Lakes, rivers and streams ==
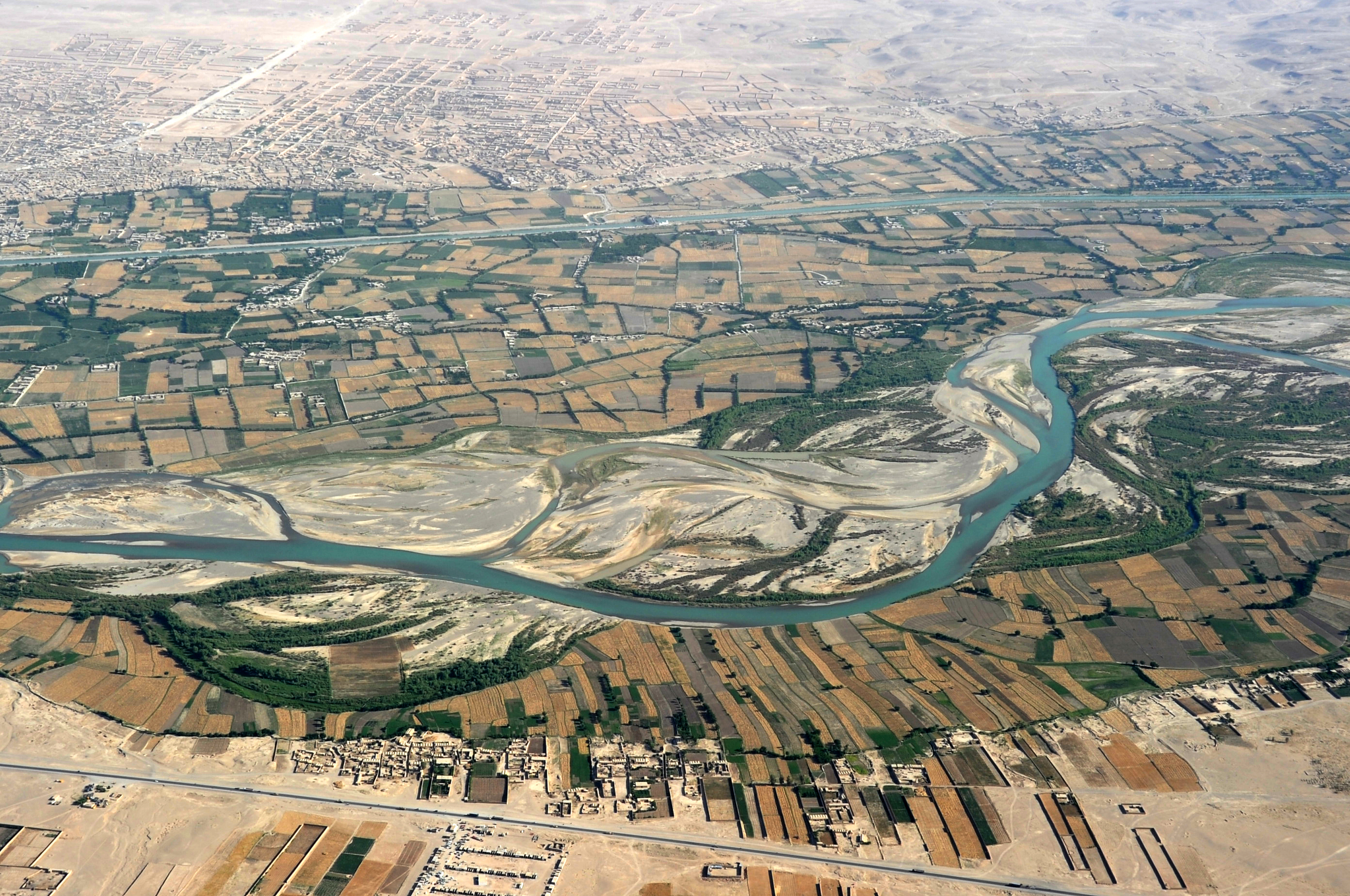
Helmand River and Boghra Canal running parallel in Helmand Province

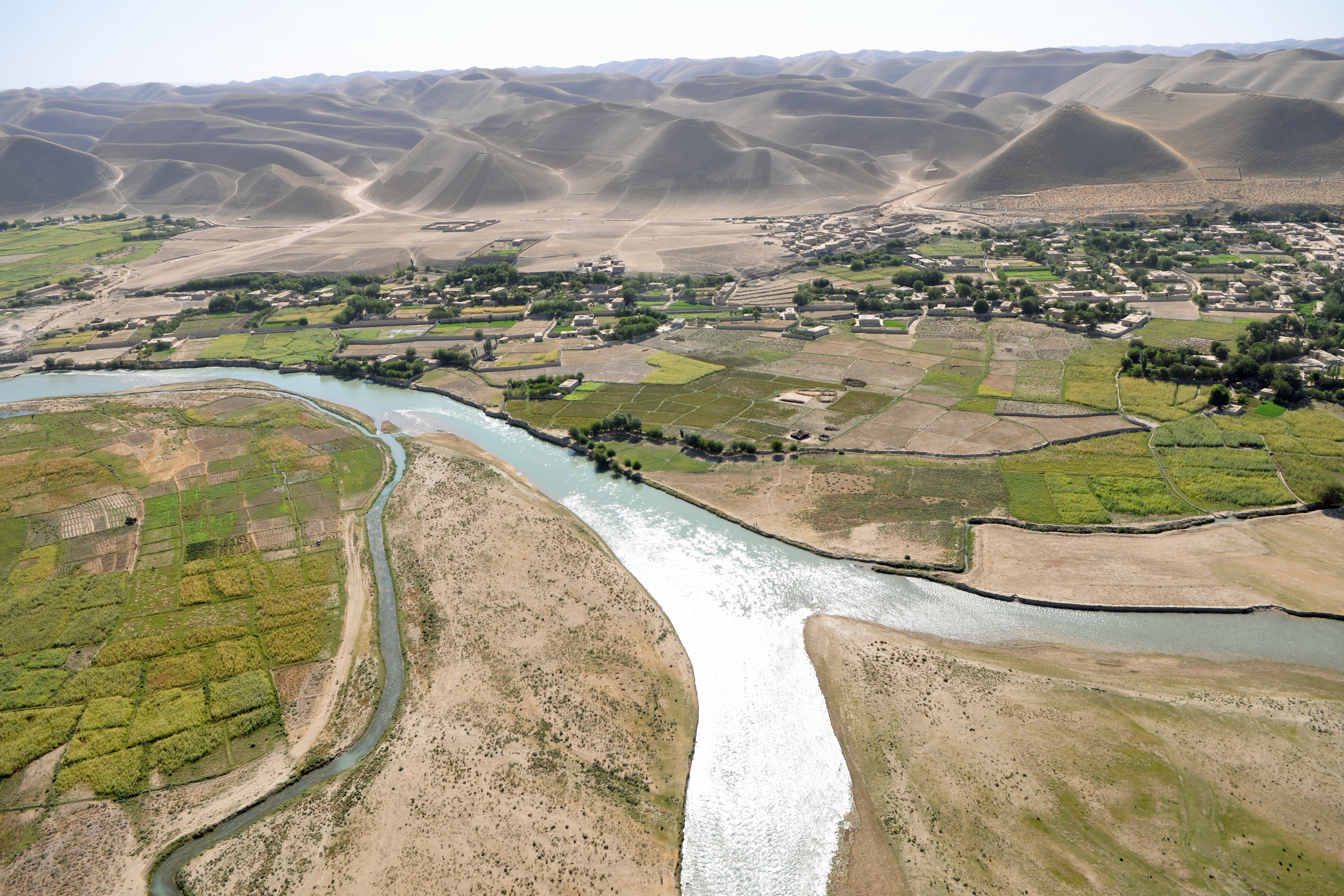
Scenic view in western Afghanistan

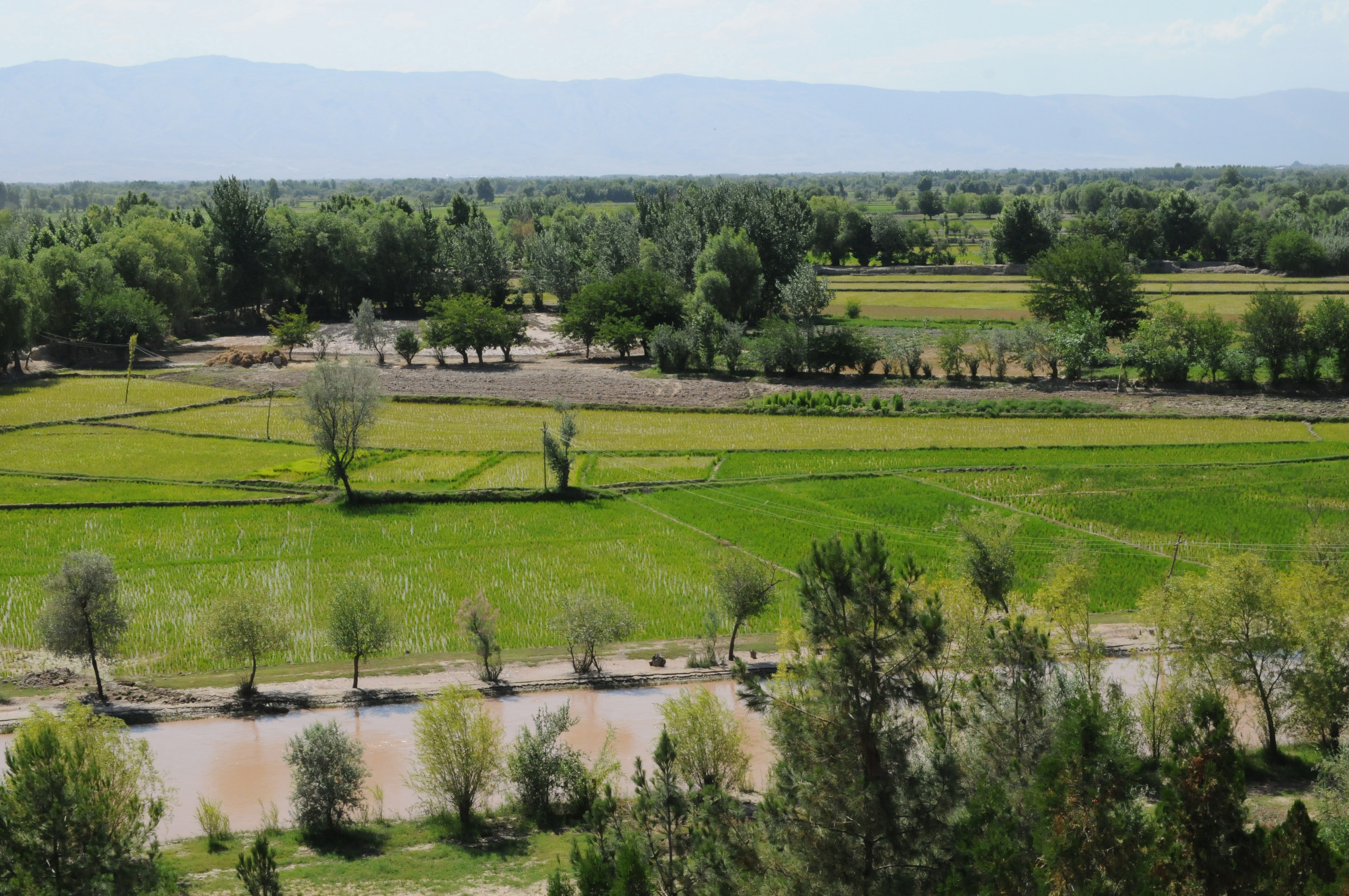
Takhar Province in northern Afghanistan

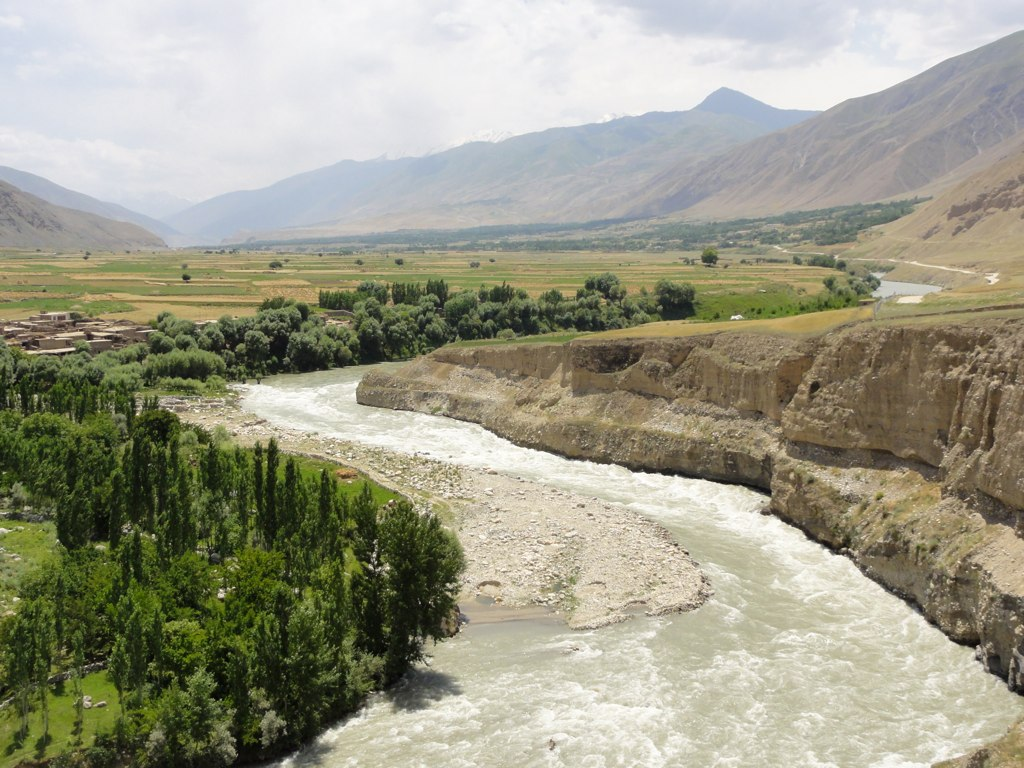
The Kokcha River in Badakhshan Province

Afghanistan receives snow between November and March, which gradually melts into numerous rivers, streams, canals, lakes, ponds, and springs, but most of the country's fresh water continues to flow into neighboring countries. It loses about two-thirds of its water to neighboring Pakistan, Iran, Tajikistan, Uzbekistan and Turkmenistan.

== Vegetation ==
On the Safed Koh alpine range itself and its immediate branches, at a height of 1,800–3,000 m (5,900–9,800 ft) there is abundant growth of large forest trees, among which conifers are the most noble and prominent, such as Cedrus deodara, Abies excelsa, Pinus longifolia, Pinus pinaster, stone pine (the edible pine, although this species is probably introduced, since it is original to Spain and Portugal) and the larch. There is also the yew, the hazel, juniper, walnut, wild peach and almond. Growing under the shade of these are several varieties of rose, honeysuckle, currant, gooseberry, hawthorn, rhododendron, among which the ranunculus family is important for frequency and number of genera. The lemon and wild vine are also present, but are more common on the northern mountains. The walnut and oak (evergreen, holly-leaved and kermes) descend to the secondary heights, where they become mixed with alder, ash, khinjak, Arbor-vitae, juniper, with species of Astragalus. Here also are Indigoferae rind dwarf laburnum.

Down to 1,000 m (3,300 ft) there are wild olive, species of rock-rose, wild privet, acacias and mimosas, barberry and Zizyphus; and in the eastern ramifications of the chain, Nannerops ritchiana (which is applied to a variety of useful purposes), Bignonia or trumpet flower, sissu, Salvadora persica, verbena, acanthus, varieties of Gesnerae.

The lowest terminal ridges, especially towards the west, are, as it has been said, naked in aspect. Their scanty vegetation is almost wholly herbal; shrubs are only occasional; trees almost non-existent. Labiate, composite and umbelliferous plants are most common. Ferns and mosses are almost confined to the higher ranges.

In the low brushwood scattered over portions of the plains of the Kandahar tablelands, it is possible to find leguminous thorny plants of the papilionaceous suborder, such as camel-thorn (Hedysarum alhagi), Astragalus in several varieties, spiny rest-harrow (Ononis spinosa), the fibrous roots of which often serve as a tooth-brush; plants of the sub-order Mimosae, as the sensitive mimosa; a plant of the rue family, called by the natives lipad; the common wormwood; also certain orchids, and several species of Salsola. The rue and wormwood are in general use as domestic medicines—the former for rheumatism and neuralgia; the latter in fever, debility and dyspepsia, as well as for a vermifuge. The lipad, owing to its heavy nauseous odour, is believed to keep off evil spirits. In some places, occupying the sides and hollows of ravines, is found the Rose Bay, called in Persian khar-zarah, or ass-bane, the wild laburnum and various Indigoferae.

== Land cover of Afghanistan ==
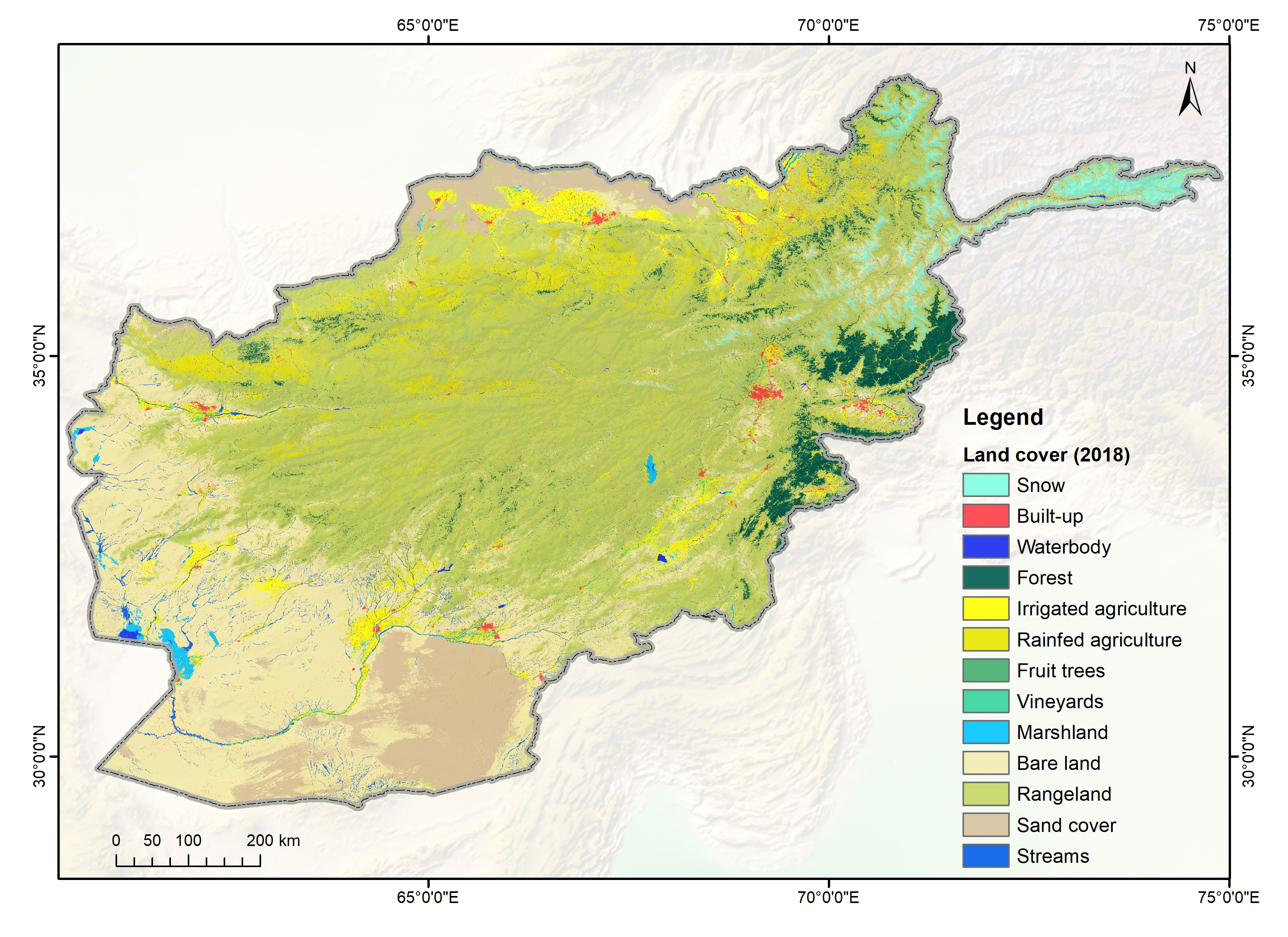
2018 Land cover of Afghanistan

Rangeland covers a significant portion of Afghanistan's northern and eastern regions, accounting for 44.58% of the country's total area in 2018. It has decreased slightly from 47.97% in 2000. Barren land, primarily found in the central and southern regions, accounted for 34.82% of the country's land area in 2018. Its size has remained fairly consistent over the years. In contrast, irrigated agriculture has steadily increased from 2.81% in 2000 to 3.30% in 2018. Irrigated agriculture is primarily concentrated in the southern and southwestern regions, particularly along river valleys and in areas with a consistent water supply.

According to an ICIMOD study from 2000, the total forest area was 18,548 km2. Between 2000 and 2018, the forest area remained relatively stable at 18,134 km2. This indicates that there was a balance of deforestation and afforestation during this time. Approximately 1,291 km2 of forest land was gained from rangeland, implying that some rangeland was converted to forest. In 2000, the total snow area was 9,496 km2. Between 2000 and 2018, the snow area decreased to 7,485 km². This implies a loss of 2,011 km2 of snow cover over the 18 years. The extents of rangeland and grassland vary depending on how snow-covered areas are classified.

Forest cover land in Afghanistan is around 2.8%, equivalent to 2,000,000 ha (4,900,000 acres). Since the 1980s, much of forests in Afghanistan have been destroyed and the timber exported to neighboring Pakistan. As a result, large percent of Afghanistan's land faced soil erosion and desertification. The government and the public continue to encounter this problem by planting millions of new trees. It made felling illegal in all provinces of the country. Afghanistan had a 2018 Forest Landscape Integrity Index mean score of 8.85/10, ranking it 15th globally out of 172 countries. For the year 2015, 100% of the forest area was reported to be under public ownership.

== See also ==
- Environmental issues in Afghanistan
- Provinces of Afghanistan
