= Arghistan =

Settlement in Kandahar Province, Afghanistan

- Location in Afghanistan
- Coordinates: 31°34′0″N 66°30′0″E
- Country: Afghanistan
- Province: Kandahar Province
- District: Arghistan District
- Elevation: 4,114 ft (1,254 m)
- Time zone: + 4.30

The village of Arghistan (Pashto: ارغستان) (also Arghestan or Arghastan) is the headquarters of Arghistan District in Kandahar Province of Afghanistan. It is located in the valley of Arghistan, near the Arghistan River, on 31.5667°N 66.5000°E at 1254 m altitude.

Arghistan Valley is where the famous Islamic scholar Dr. Muhammad Muhsin Khan's tribe (Al-Khoashki Al-Jamandi) live.

== See also ==
- Kandahar Province
