= Kaj River =

River of western Afghanistan, flowing through Daykundi Province

The Kaj is a river of western Afghanistan, flowing through Daykundi Province. It is a major tributary of the Helmand River.

== Geography ==
The Kaj rises in the far northern part of Daykundi Province in Daykundi District in the region called Hazarajat not far from the boundary with Bamyan Province. Shortly after its birth, the Kaj follows a southbound direction. It ends with its confluence with the right bank of the Helmand river, about forty miles north of Deh Rawod.

== Hydrology ==
The seasonal pattern of flow is typical of rivers in high mountains of central Afghanistan taking into account seasonal snow melt.

The average annual flow or module was calculated over a period of 6 years (from 1974 to 1979) and was more or less than 35 cubic meters per second. The curve oscillation observed daily flows in 1978 is quite similar to the average of these 6 years.

The period of high water occurs in late winter and the beginning of spring. The maximum flow is observed in late February to early May when there is snowmelt. It reaches 200 to 300 cubic meters per second on average during the first half of April. This period of high water is followed by a steadily declining rate that falls below 20 cubic meters as of early June The drop therefore slows and the rate reached its lowest average of 5 to 7 m^{3} per second in early autumn, i.e. in September–October. Some thunderstorms and showers are present in the dry season which account for occasional breaks in the trend. An intermediate period (with a moderate flow rate) occurs during the cold season, from early October to early March, during which the average rate rises slowly but fairly steadily, from 7 to 15 cubic meters per second.

For the year 1978 the rate fluctuated between a low of 5 and a high of approximately 160 m^{3}. The peak was reached rapidly melting snow in April.
