= Dori River =

River in Afghanistan and Pakistan

Coordinates: 31°23′N 65°45′E

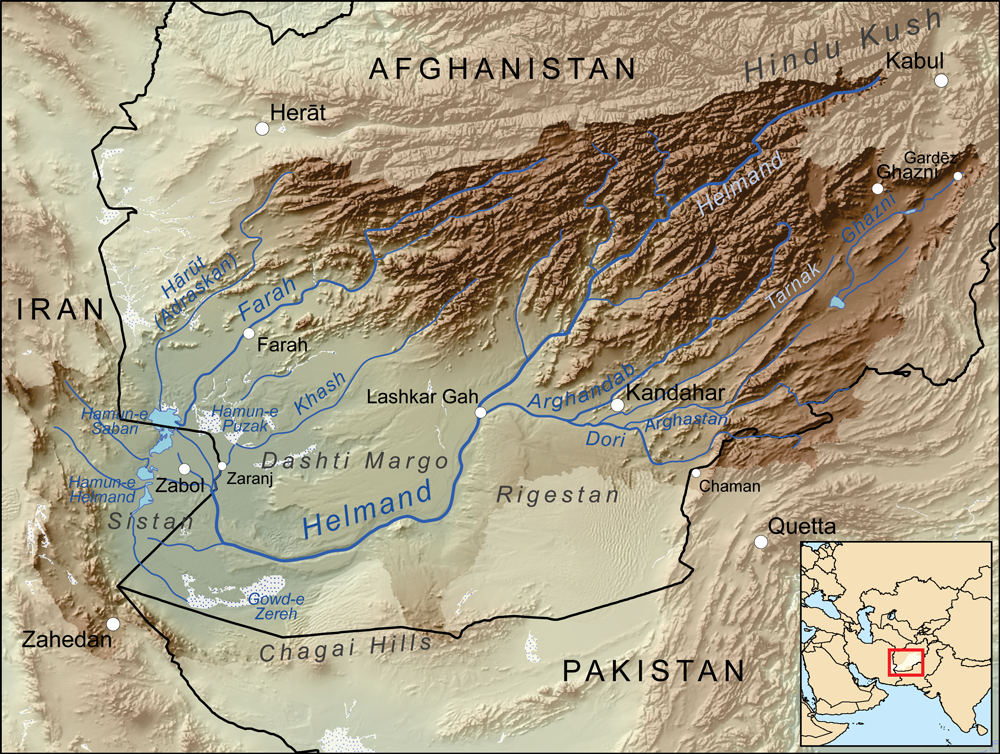
Map of the Helmand River drainage basin showing the Dori River

The Dori, also called the Lora and Kadanai, is a river of Afghanistan and Pakistan. It runs for 320 kilometres (200 mi) from Balochistan province in Pakistan through Kandahar Province in Afghanistan, then flows into the Arghandab River.

The Dori begins north of the city of Quetta, the provincial capital of Balochistan. It is called Lora in its headwaters in Pakistan. The name changes to Kadanai upon its entry into Afghanistan, with the river called the Dori below the town of Spin Baldak.

In Afghanistan, the Dori first runs westward and soon faces the sandy desert of Rigestan in southeastern Afghanistan. It then takes a northerly direction and along the desert passes east and northeast past Takht-e Pol, bordering southeast of the Kandahar Valley. Further on, it receives the Arghistan River, then the Tarnak River, some 30 kilometres (19 mi) south of the city of Kandahar.

== Hydrology ==
The Dori receives most of its flow from melting snow in spring, especially in March.

Withdrawal of irrigation water has greatly reduced the river's flow and speed. At Takht-e Pol it amounts to more or less 1 metre per second (3.3 ft/s).
