= Arghistan District =

Arghistan District ارغستان
- District
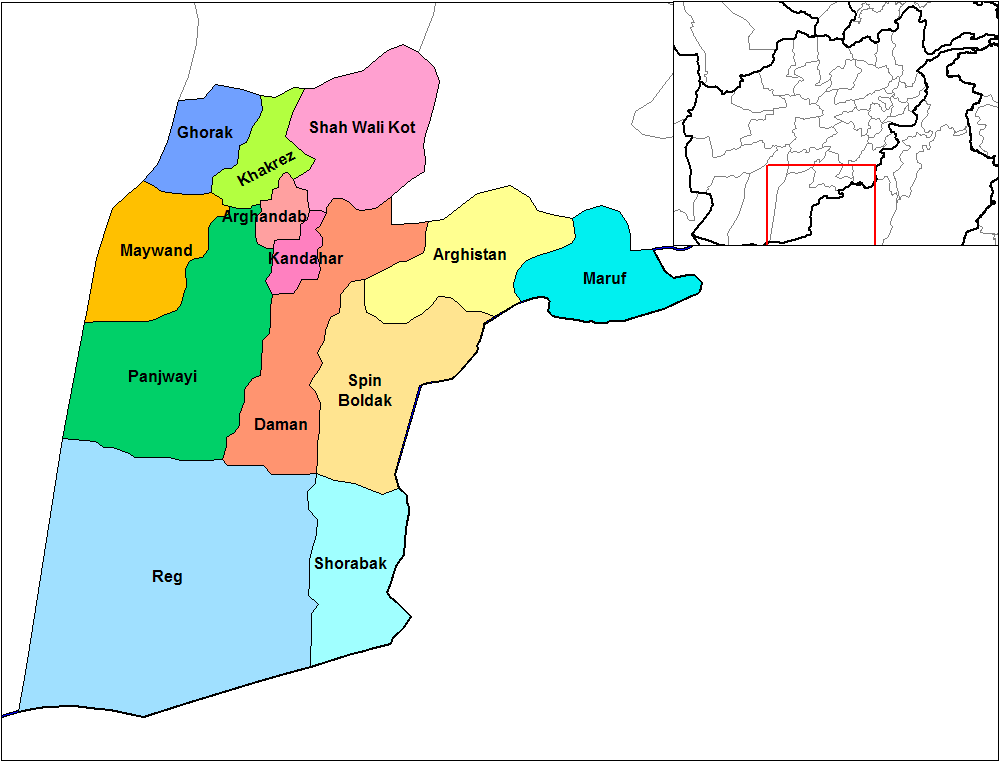
- Districts of Kandahar

- Location in Afghanistan
- Coordinates: 31°31′15″N 66°33′15″E
- Country: Afghanistan
- Province: Kandahar Province
- Center: Town of Arghistan

Population (2006)
  - Total: 30,500
- Time zone: + 4.30

The Arghistan District (Pashto: ارغستان ولسوالۍ) is a district in the northeastern part of Kandahar Province, Afghanistan. It borders Spin Boldak District to the south and west, Daman District to the west, Zabul Province to the north, Maruf District to the east, and Pakistan to the south. The population is 30,500 (2006). The district's center is the village of Arghistan, in the physical center of the district in the Arghistan River valley.

== History ==
In 2007, American soldiers guarded Provincial Reconstruction Teams in Arghistan. They left in late 2014 and the Afghan National Security Forces took over their responsibilities. In December 2020, work was completed on a dam that can store up to 126,000 cubic meters of water.

2014

On September 8, in an evening attack on police headquarters in Arghistan District in Kandahar Province, a Taliban suicide bomber killed district police chief Abdul Manaf and his 2 guards and wounded 6 other police officers.

2018

On July 16, the Taliban attacked a police checkpoint in Arghistan District in Kandahar Province during the night, killing nine policemen and wounding seven. Some 25 Taliban were killed and 15 wounded.
