= Ab-i Istada =

Lake in Afghanistan

Ab-e Istada
- Āb-e Istāda, Ab-e Estada, Āb-e Īstādeh-e Moqor, Lake Istada
- آب ایستاده (Persian)
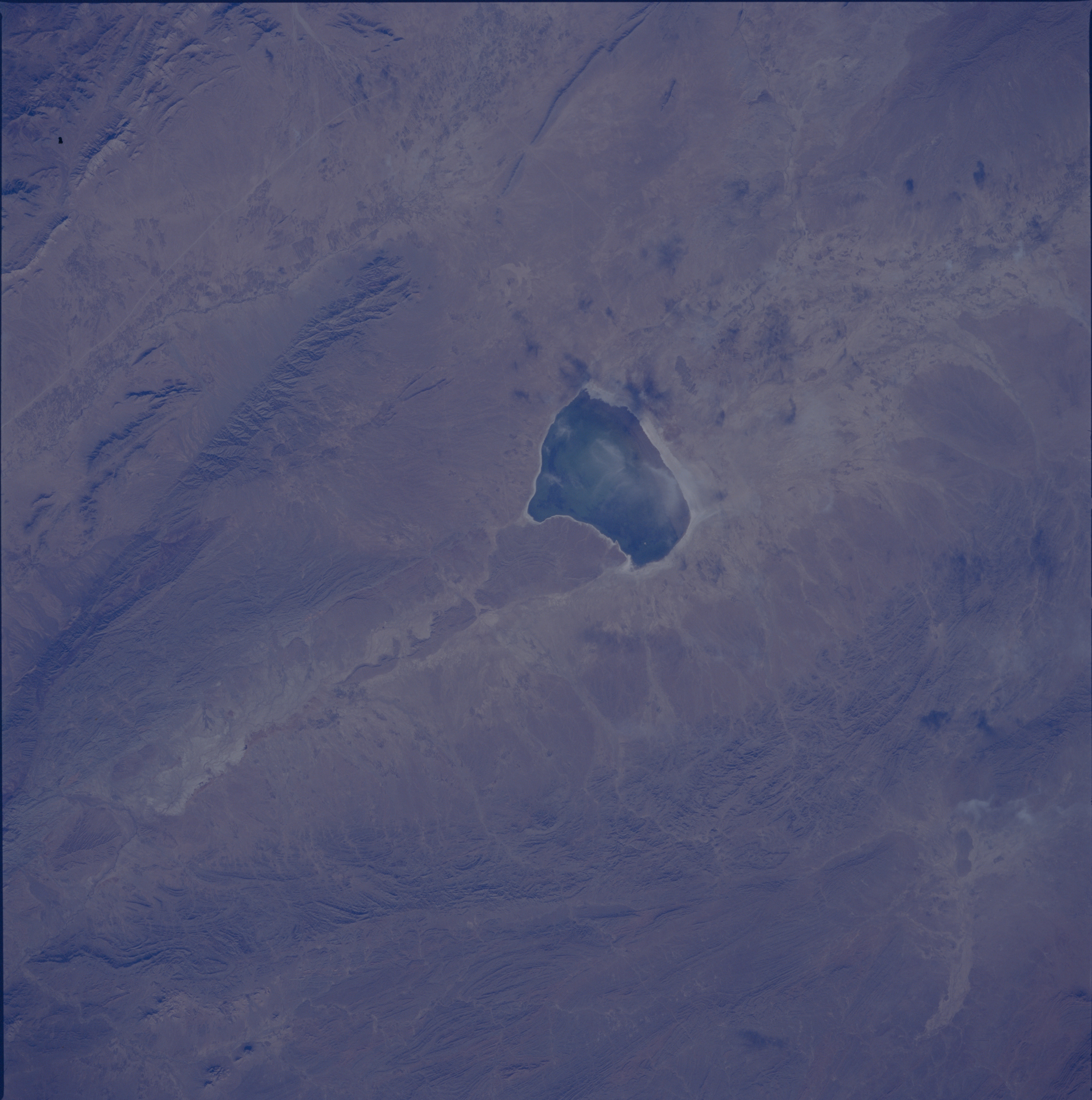
- Ab-e Istada in November 1996. The Kabul–Kandahar Highway is visible in the top left corner.

- Location within Afghanistan
- Interactive map of Ab-e Istada
- Location: Nawa District, Ghazni Province, Afghanistan
- Coordinates: 32.5°N 67.9°E
- Type: Salt lake
- Primary inflows: Ghazni River, Sardeh River, Nahara River
- Catchment area: 17,252 km^{2} (6,661 sq mi)
- Basin countries: Afghanistan
- Surface area: 130 km^{2} (50 sq mi)
- Max. depth: 3.7 m (12 ft)
- Surface elevation: 2,070 m (6,790 ft)
- Islands: Loya ghundai, Kuchney ghundai

Ab-i Istada ("standing water") is an endorheic salt lake in the Nawa District of Ghazni Province in Afghanistan. It lies in a large depression created by the Chaman Fault system in the southern foothills of the Hindu Kush, 125 km (78 mi) west of Ghazni.

== Description ==
In modern times the lake has been reported to have a surface area of 130 km^{2} (50 sq mi), although it dries out periodically. It is very shallow, not exceeding 3.7 m (12 ft) in depth. There are two small islands near the lake's southeastern shore, Loya ghundai (2,500 m^{2} [27,000 sq ft]) and Kuchney ghundai (500 m^{2} [5,400 sq ft]). The water is highly alkaline and mass die-offs of freshwater fish from the Ghazni River sometimes occur.

The main inflows into Ab-i Istada are the Ghazni, Sardeh and Nahara Rivers, which drain into it from the northeast. The watershed draining into the lake covers 17,252 km^{2} (6,661 sq mi) and was home to over 1.8 million people in 2003. Three sets of raised beaches surrounding the lake have been noted at 2–3 m (6 ft 7 in – 9 ft 10 in), 6–7 m (20–23 ft) and 9–10 m (30–33 ft) above the normal lake level. At high water levels, the lake is known to overflow into the Lora River, a tributary of the Arghistan River, through two channels on the south side of the lake, Akasi Mandeh and Sekva Mandeh. A groundwater connection between the lake and the Lora drainage has been suggested.

== Settlement ==
Historically the area around the lake was unpopulated, although nomads from nearby regions visited it in the summer. More recently, the Tarakai have settled near the lake: in 2003 there were eight villages within 10 km (6.2 mi) with a total population of approximately 5000. Economic activities around the lake include trapping of saker and peregrine falcons, grazing and collection of fuel wood.

== Environment ==
The wetlands around Ab-i Istada attract a variety of migratory birds, over 120 species having previously been recorded. Babur observed enormous flocks of greater flamingoes at the lake; their numbers in recent years have varied between 0 and 9000. The wetlands were once a critical stopover for the central migratory population of Siberian cranes, but these have not been sighted at the lake since 1986. In 1974, the Afghani government proclaimed a Waterfowl and Flamingo Sanctuary around the lake, causing considerable resentment among the locals; conservation efforts ended with the Soviet invasion in 1979 and have not been restarted since.

=== Important bird area ===
A 27,000 ha area, encompassing the lake and its immediate surrounds, has been designated an Important Bird Area (IBA) by BirdLife International because it supports populations of greylag geese, common pochards, greater flamingos, Siberian cranes, grey herons, great white pelicans, black-winged stilts, Kentish plovers, slender-billed gulls and gull-billed terns.

== See also ==
- Environmental issues in Afghanistan
- List of dams and reservoirs in Afghanistan
- List of protected areas of Afghanistan
