= Tarnak River =

River in Afghanistan

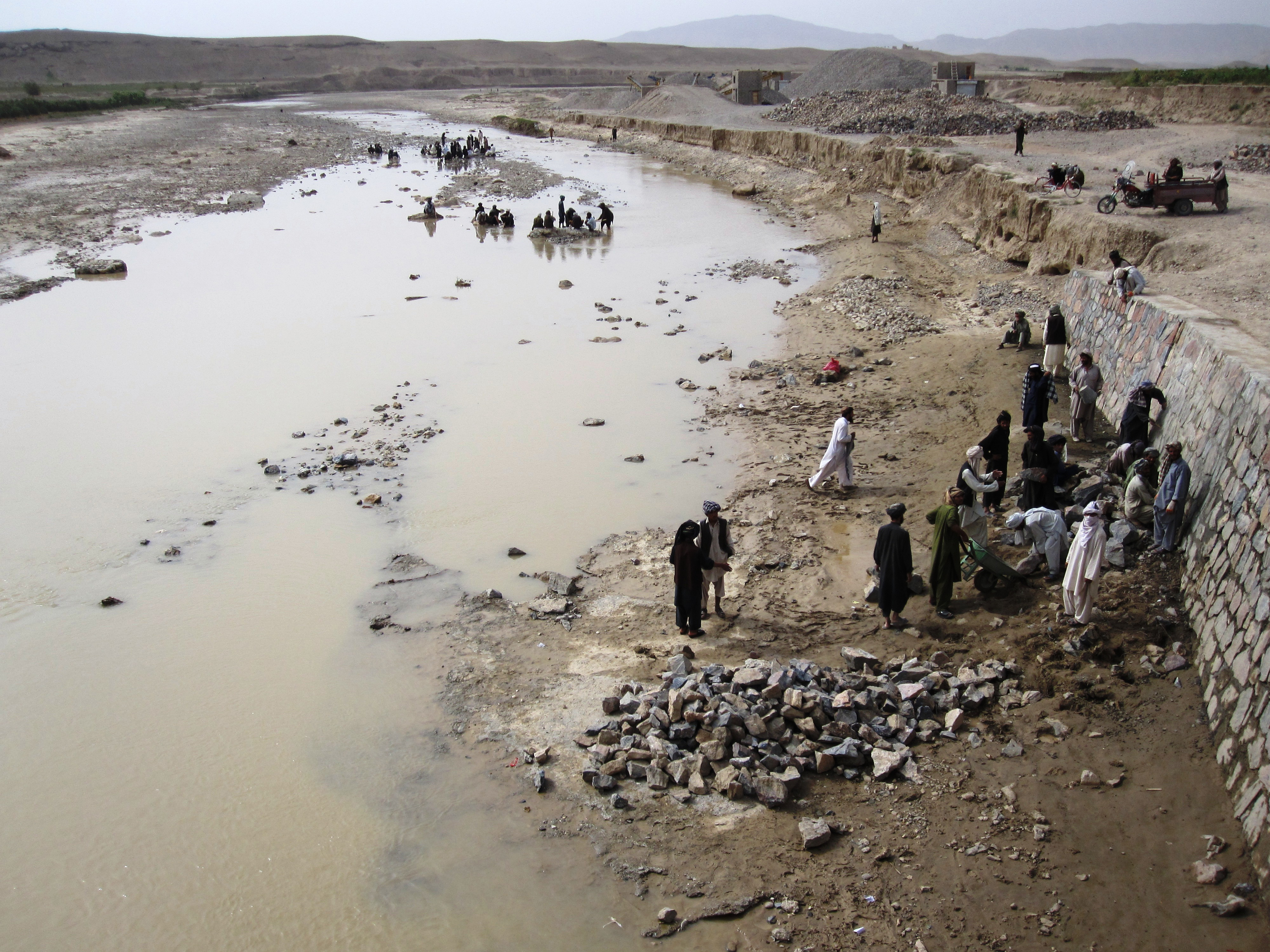

Location
- Country: Afghanistan

The Tarnak River is located in Ghazni, Zabul, and Kandahar provinces of Afghanistan. The city of Kandahar is located on a plain directly adjacent to the Tarnak.

It rises in Afghanistan's highlands region of Hazarajat, near 33°7′N 67°56′E, south of the Lomar Pass. The Tarnak flows in a south-westerly direction for around 350 km before joining the Dori River some 30 km downstream of the Dori-Arghastan confluence, and some 30 km upstream of the Dori-Arghandab confluence, at 31°24′N 65°33′E. The combined waters of these rivers join the Helmand at 31°27′N 64°23′E, near Lashkargah.

== Geography ==
The Tarnak River valley is a tectonic trough that runs from northeast to southwest. It has multilayered aquifers and both Quaternary and Neocene deposits.
