= Arghandab River =

River in Afghanistan

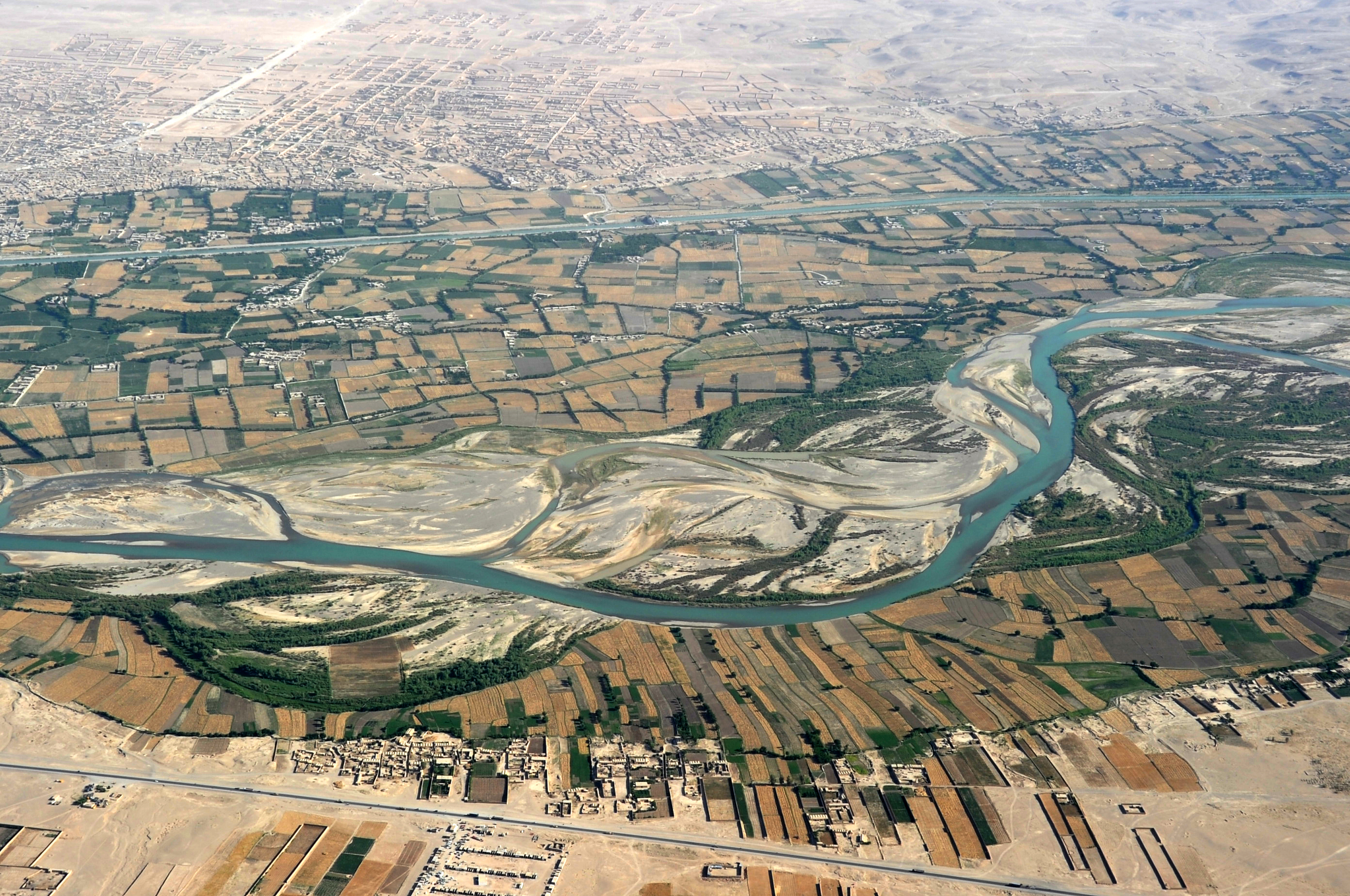

- Mouth of the Arghandar River in Afghanistan
- Native name: Arghandaw rod (Pashto)

Location
- Country: Afghanistan
- Cities: Kandahar; Lashkargah

Physical characteristics
- Source
  - location: North of Sang-e-Masha
  - coordinates: 33.436630°N 67.516588°E
- Mouth
  - location: Lashkargah
  - coordinates: 31.432381°N 64.383568°E
- Length: 400 km (250 mi)

The Arghandab is a river in Afghanistan, about 400 km (250 mi) in length. It rises in Ghazni Province, west of the city of Ghazni, and flows southwest, passing near the city of Kandahar, before joining the Helmand River 30 km (19 mi) below the town of Grishk. In its lower course, it is much used for irrigation, under the control of the Helmand and Arghandab Valley Authority, and the valley is cultivated and populous; yet the water is said to be somewhat brackish. It is doubtful whether the ancient Arachotus is to be identified with the Arghandab or its chief confluent the Tarnak, which joins it on the left 50 km (31 mi) southwest of Kandahar. The Tarnak, which flows south of Kandahar, is much shorter (length about 320 km or 200 miles) and less copious.

== Historical background ==
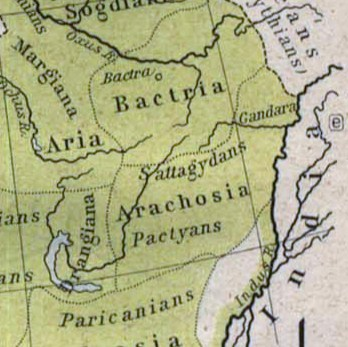
Arachosia in 500 BC

The river was known to the ancient Persians as the Haraxvaiti in Avestan and Harahuvati in Old Persian, which are cognate with Rigvedic Sarasvati (as described in its "family books"). Scholars such as Boyce and Parpola have identified Greek Arachosia as a Hellenization of the name, meaning the land of the Haraxvaiti. Rigveda's hymn VI.61.2 describes it with the words:

By means of her gushing and powerful waves, this (Sarasvatī) has crushed the ridge of the mountains, (breaking river banks) like a man who digs for lotus roots; with praises and prayers, we solicit Sarasvatī for her help, (Sarasvatī) who slays the foreigners.

Historian Asko Parpola states: "Arghandab [...] descends from a height of nearly four kilometers down to about 700 meters when it joins the Helmand River, which eventually forms shallow lakes." Sarasvatī- is interpreted to mean "full of lakes".

Some historians, however, assert that the Avestan Haraxvaiti as well as the Rigvedic Sarasvati refer to the Helmand River. The Rigvedic name of Arghandab is then believed to be Drishadvati. (Note: Ram Sharan Sharma: "In the Ṛg Veda, the Sarasvati is called the best of the rivers (naditama). It seems to have been a great river with perennial water... The earliest Sarasvati is considered identical with the Helmand in Afghanistan which is called Harakhwati in the Avesta. But the archaeology of the Helmand valley in the second millennium BC needs adequate attention."; Rajesh Kocchar: "The Avestan Harahvaiti, phonetically the same as Sarasvati, was known to the Greeks as Etymander and is now called Arghandab. The naditama Sarasvati, however, is to be equated not with the Arghandab but with the Helmand, of which the Arghandab is the main tributary. ... There is an uncanny similarity between the Rgvedic description of Sarasvati and Avestan description of the Helmand.")

The ruins at Ulan Robat, supposed to represent the city of Arachosia, are in its basin; and the lake known as Ab-i Istada, the most probable representative of Lake Arachotus, is near the head of the Tarnak, though not communicating with it. The Tarnak is dammed for irrigation at intervals, and almost dries up in the summer.

== Upper course ==
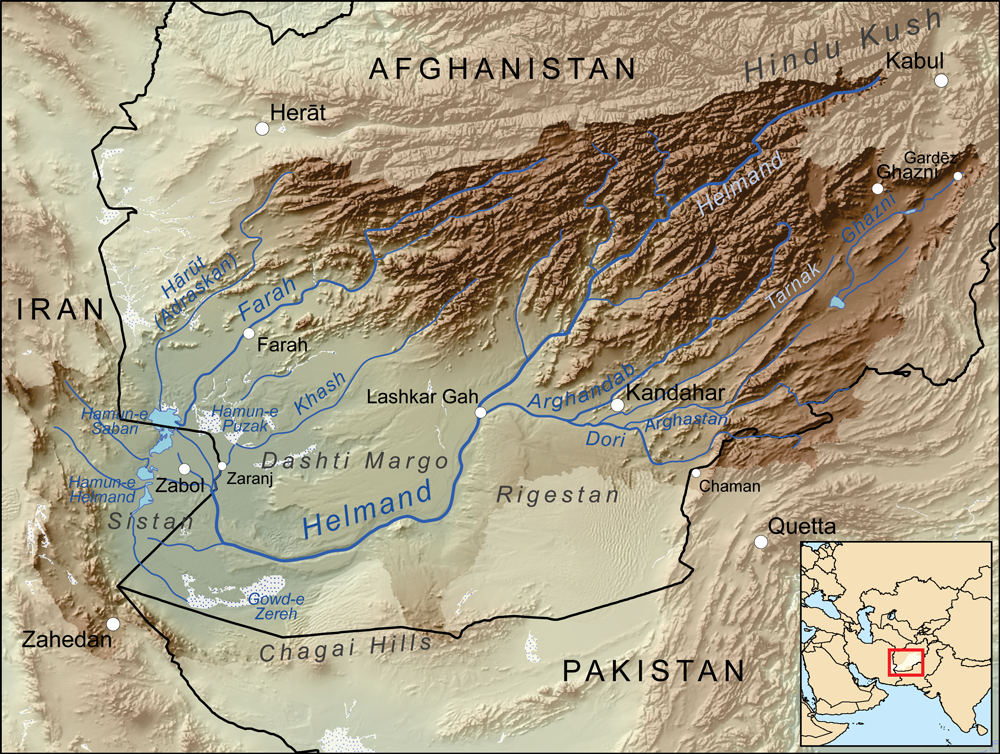
Helmand–Arghandab basin terrain map

The upper course of the Arghandab river is relatively unexplored. The Historical and Political Gazetteer of Afghanistan cites the explorations of Major G. Lynch in 1841, (Note: Possibly the British political agent Kalat-i-Ghilzai.)

according to whom the origin of the Arghandab is 20 to 30 miles north of Sang-e-Masha. This places the source in the mountains southwest of the Nawar basin. Lynch also described the upper course of the river as being a "mountain torrent, dashing over great granite rocks and about 3 feet deep where fordable".

== Lower course ==
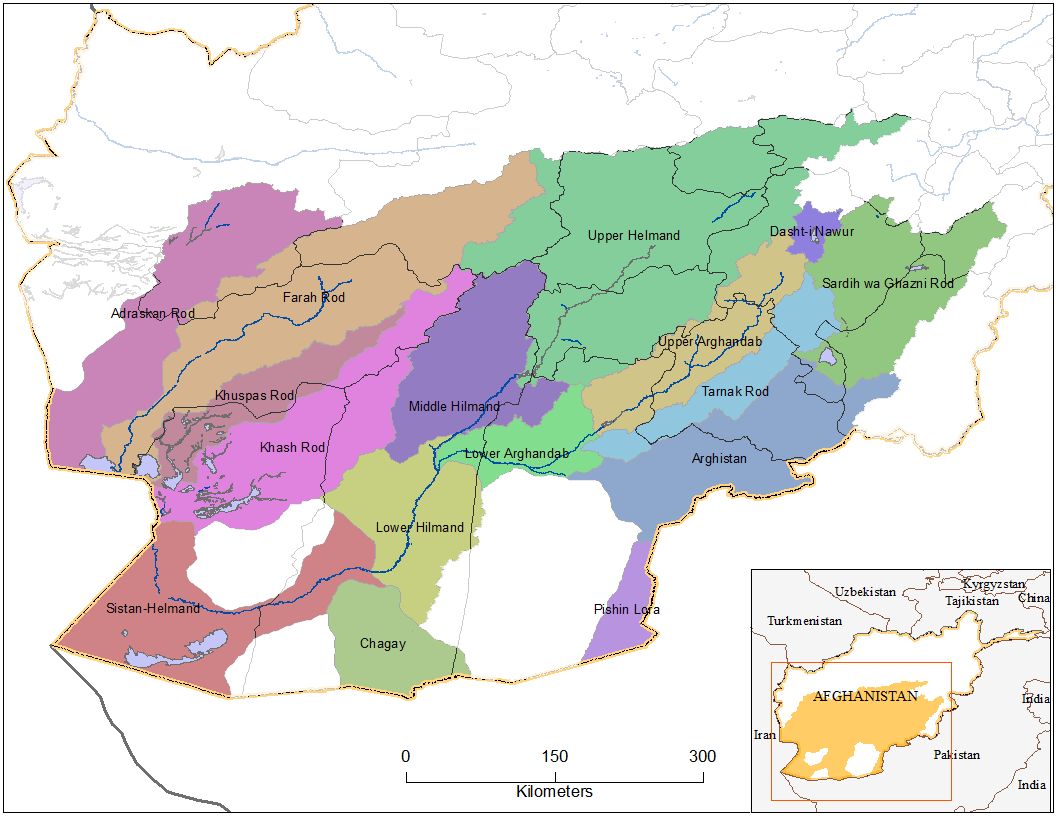
Helmand–Arghandab basin

There is a good deal of cultivation along the river, but few villages. The Kabul-Kandahar Highway passes this way (another reason for supposing the Tarnak to be Arachotus), and the people live off the road to avoid the onerous duties of hospitality.

== Dahla dam ==
In 2008, a project was initiated to rehabilitate the Dahla Dam and associated irrigation system.

== See also ==
- List of rivers of Afghanistan

== Bibliography ==
- Adamec, Ludwig W., ed. (1980), Historical and Political Gazetteer of Afghanistan, Vol. 5 (PDF), Akademische Druck- u. Verlagsanstalt, ISBN 978-3-201-01125-9
- Parpola, Asko (2015), The Roots of Hinduism: The Early Aryans and the Indus Civilization, Oxford University Press Incorporated, ISBN 978-0190226923
