= Arghistan River =

River in Afghanistan

Coordinates: 31°23′N 65°45′E

The Arghistan or Arghastan (Pashto: ارغستان) is a river in southern Afghanistan. It flows through Arghistan District and the provinces of Zabul and Kandahar. It is a tributary of the Dori River, a sub-tributary of the Helmand River. It flows for 280 kilometres (170 mi) and has a basin area of 20,219 square kilometres (7,807 sq mi).

== Geography ==
The river rises in south-eastern Afghanistan, in the province of Zabul, near the border with Pakistan. Shortly after its start, the Arghastan takes a west-southwest course. It joins the Dori on the right bank, about 30 miles (48 km) south-west (downstream) of Kandahar. In its lower course, its waters are widely used to irrigate the oases of Kandahar, and its flow is greatly reduced. The average annual flow or module of the river is 2 cubic metres per second (71 cu ft/s) near the town of Kandahar.

The Lora River (not to be confused with the Dori River, also known as the Lora River in its upper reaches) is a tributary from the northeast with its headwaters near Ab-i Istada lake. It joins the Arghastan on its right bank in its lower reaches.
