= Helmand River =

Major river in Afghanistan

Helmand
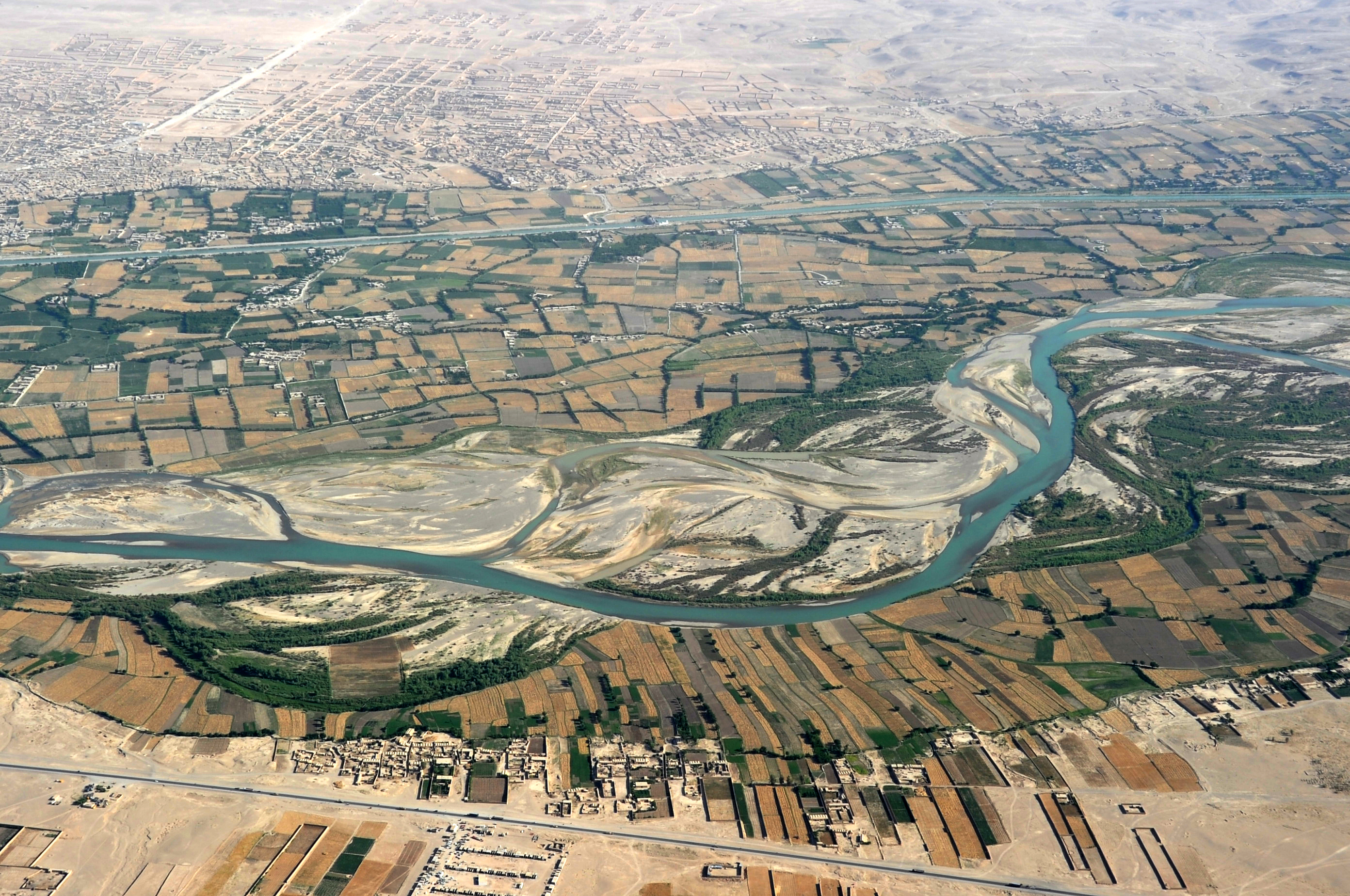
- Helmand and Boghra Canal beyond it

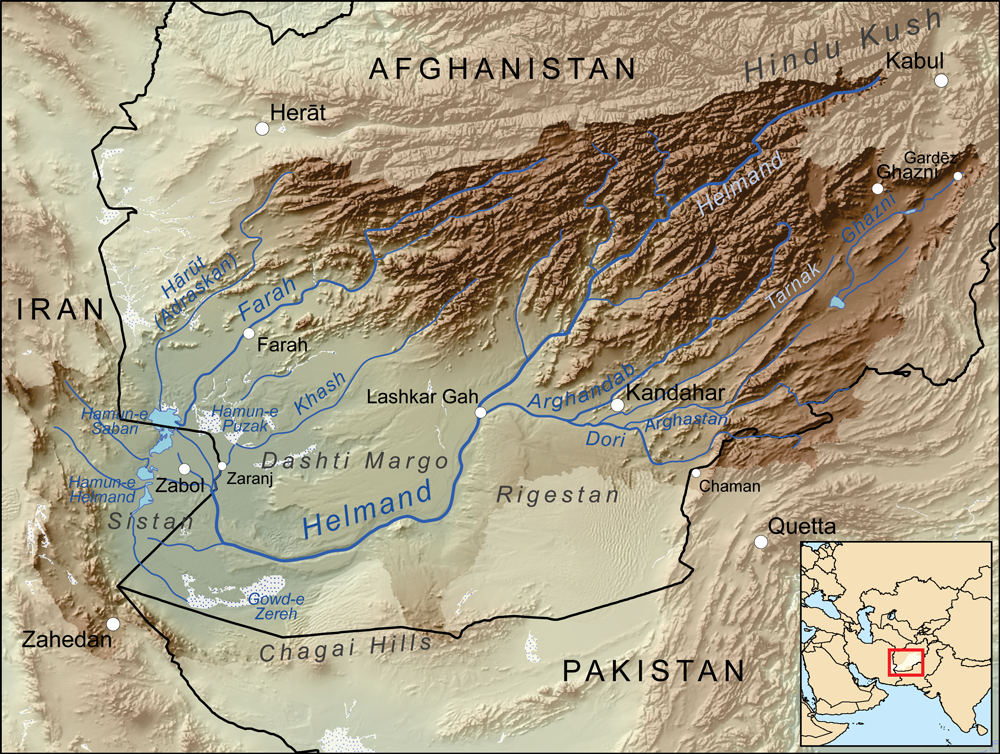
- Map of the Helmand drainage basin

Location
- Countries: Afghanistan and Iran

Physical characteristics
- Source
  - location: Hindu Kush mountains
- Mouth
  - location: Hamun Lake
- Length: 1,150 km (710 mi)
- Basin size: Sistan Basin

Basin features
- Tributaries
  - left: Arghandab River
  - right: Khash River; Chagay River

The Helmand river, (Note: Pashto: هلمند, romanized: Hilmand, pronounced [hilˈmand]; Dari: هلمند, romanized: Hilmand, cyrillized: Ҳилманд, pronounced [hɪlˈmand]) also historically known as the Etymandros, (Note: Ancient Greek: Ἐτύμανδρος, romanized: Etýmandros; Latin: Erymandrus) is the longest river in Afghanistan and the primary watershed for the endorheic Sistan Basin. It originates in the Sanglakh Range of the Hindu Kush mountains in the northeastern part of Maidan Wardak Province, where it is separated from the watershed of the Kabul River by the Unai Pass. The Helmand feeds into the Hamun Lake on the border of Afghanistan and Iran.

== Etymology ==
The name comes from the Avestan Haētumant, literally "dammed, having a dam", which referred to the Helmand River and the irrigated areas around it. The word Haetumant is cognate with Sanskrit Setumatī meaning "one which has a dam."

== Geography ==
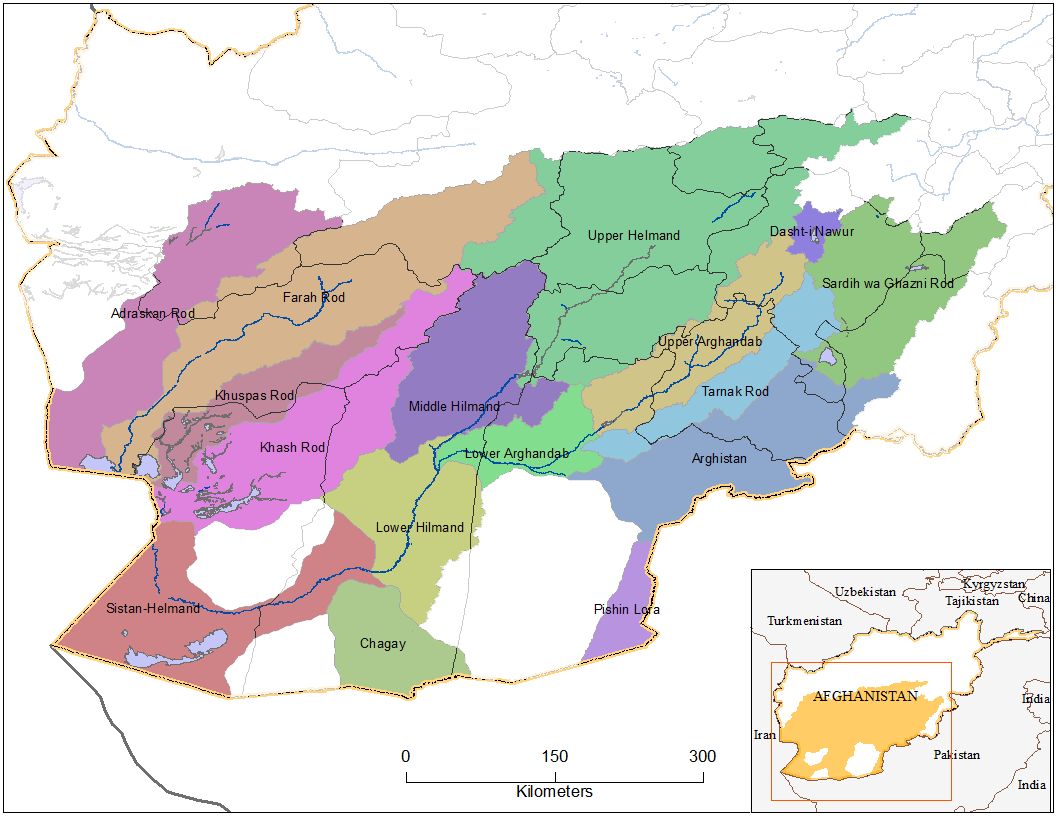
Helmand River basin map

The Helmand stretches for 1,150 km (710 mi). It rises in the northeastern part of Maidan Wardak Province in the Hindu Kush mountains, about 40 km west of Kabul (34°34′N 68°33′E), flowing southwestward through Daykundi Province and Uruzgan Province. After passing through the city of Lashkargah in Helmand Province, it enters the desert of Dasht-e Margo, and then flows to the Sistan marshes and the Hamun-i-Helmand lake region around Zabol at the Afghan-Iranian border (31°9′N 61°33′E). A few smaller rivers such as Tarnak and Arghandab flow into Helmand.

This river, managed by the Helmand and Arghandab Valley Authority, is used extensively for irrigation, although a buildup of mineral salts has decreased its usefulness in watering crops. For much of its length, the Helmand is free of salt. Its waters are essential for farmers in Afghanistan, but it feeds into the Hamun Lake and is also important to farmers in Iran's southeastern Sistan and Baluchistan province.

A number of hydroelectric dams have created artificial reservoirs on some of the Afghanistan's rivers including the Kajaki Dam on the Helmand River. The chief tributary of the Helmand river, the Arghandab River (confluence at 31°27′N 64°23′E), also has a major dam, north of Kandahar.

== History ==
The Helmand valley region is mentioned by name in the Avesta (Fargard 1:13) as the Aryan land of Haetumant, one of the early centres of the Zoroastrian faith in areas that are now Afghanistan. However, by the late first millennium BC and early first millennium AD, the preponderance of communities of Hindus and Buddhists in the Helmand and Kabul valleys led to Parthians referring to it as India. From 1758 to 1842, the Helmand formed the northern borders of the Brahui Khanate of Kalat.

== See also ==
- 2023 Afghanistan–Iran clash
- List of rivers of Afghanistan
- Kamal Khan Dam
- Kajaki Dam

== Sources ==
- Various authors. "HELMAND RIVER". Encyclopædia Iranica (Online ed.). United States: Columbia University.
- Frye, Richard N. (1963). The Heritage of Persia. World Publishing company, Cleveland, Ohio. Mentor Book edition, 1966.
- Toynbee, Arnold J. (1961). Between Oxus and Jumna. London. Oxford University Press.
- Vogelsang, W. (1985). "Early historical Arachosia in South-east Afghanistan; Meeting-place between East and West." Iranica antiqua, 20 (1985), pp. 55–99.
