= Environmental issues in Afghanistan =

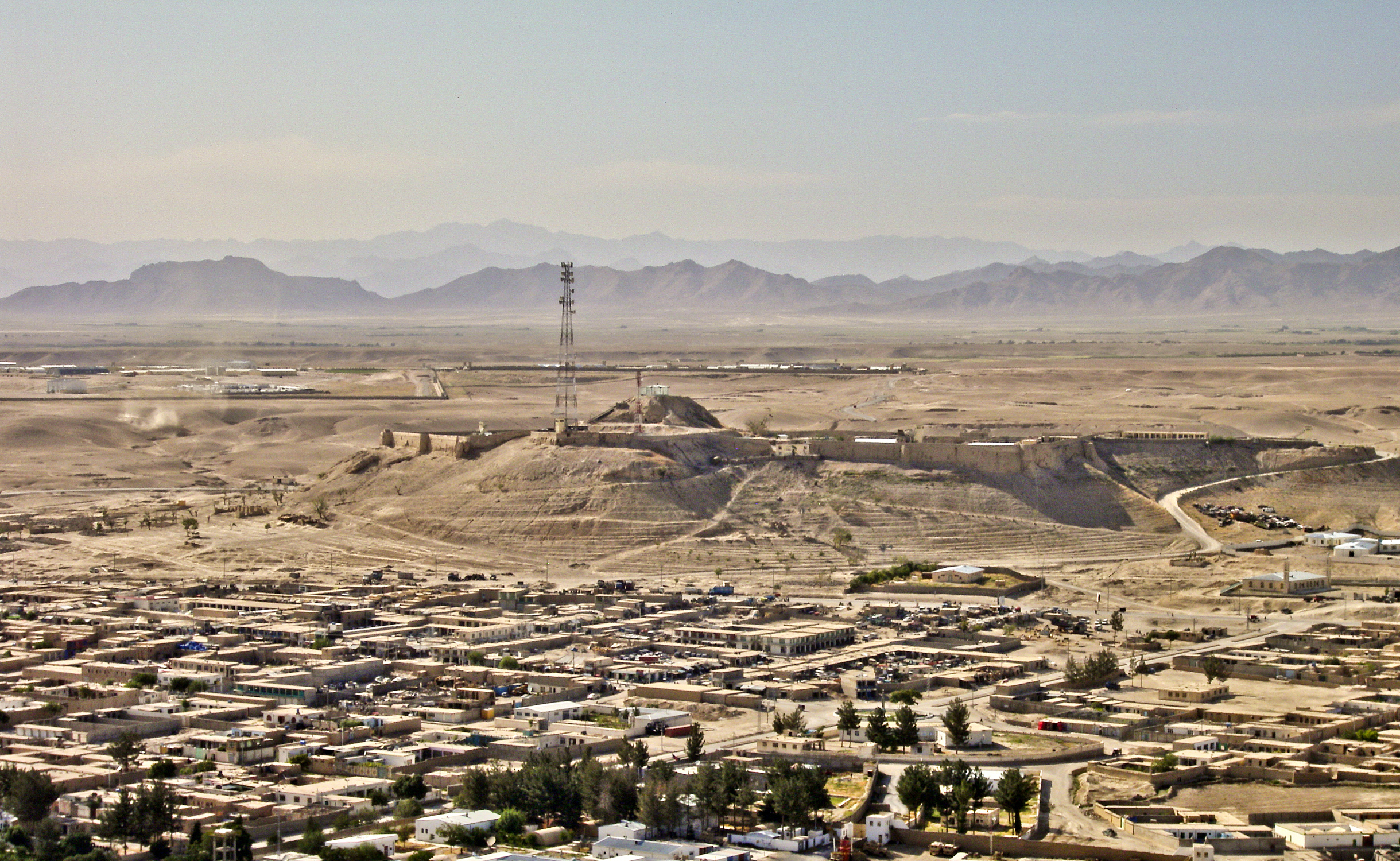
Qalat, Zabul Province in 2010

Environmental issues in Afghanistan are monitored by the National Environmental Protection Agency (NEPA). These issues predate the political turmoil of the past few decades. Forests have been depleted by centuries of grazing and farming, practices which have only increased with modern population growth.

In Afghanistan, environmental conservation and economic concerns are not at odds; with over 44% of the population dependent on herding or farming, welfare of the environment is critical to the economic welfare of the people. Environmental hazards cause about 26% of all deaths in the country.

== Climate change ==
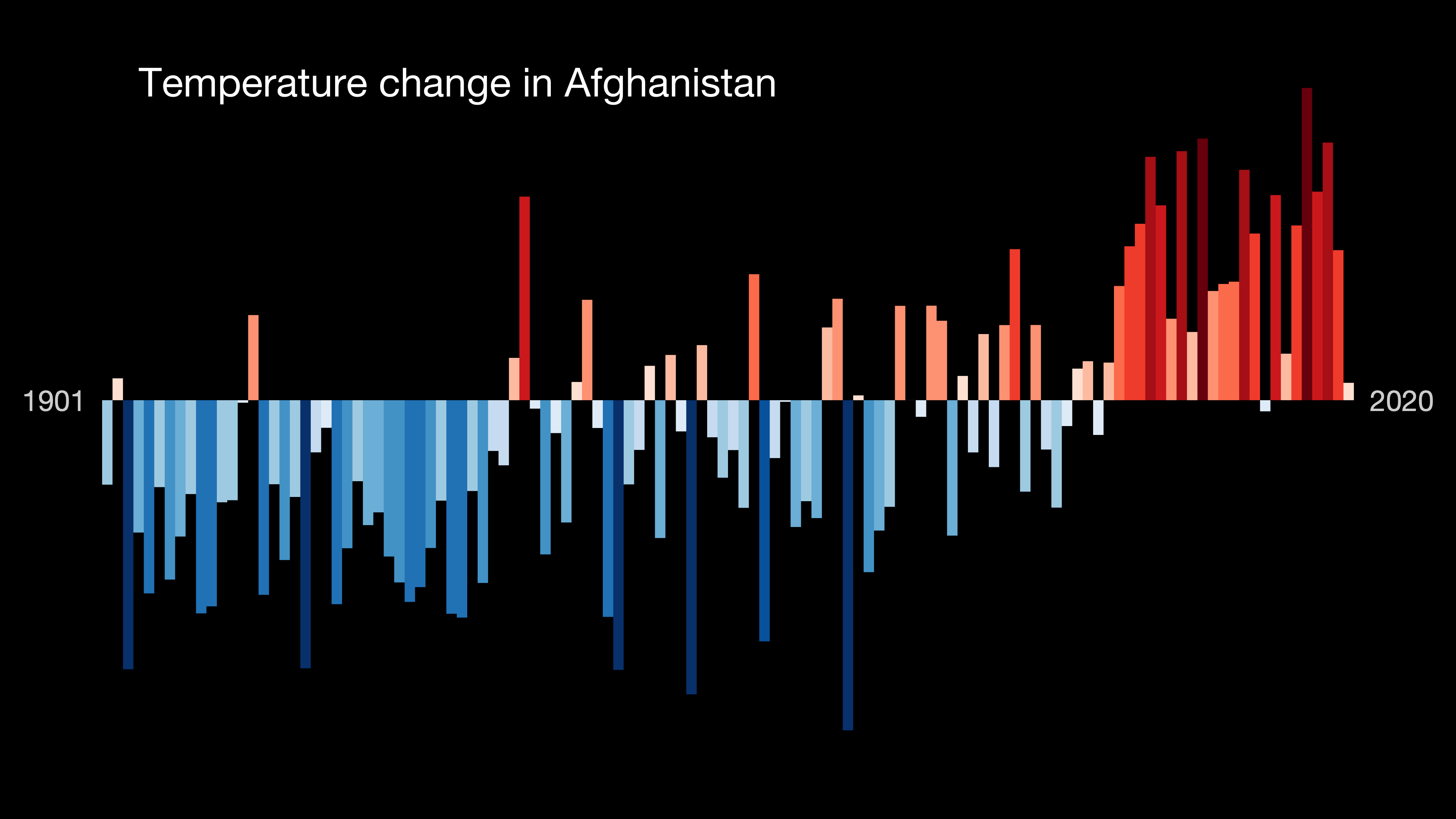
Graph showing temperature change in Afghanistan between 1901 and 2021.

In Afghanistan, climate change has led to a temperature increase of 1.8 °C since 1950. This has caused far-reaching impacts on Afghanistan, culminating from overlapping interactions of natural disasters (due to changes in the climate system), conflict, agricultural dependency, and severe socio-economic hardship.

Due to a combination of political, geographic, and social factors, Afghanistan is one of the most vulnerable nations to climate change impacts. The country ranks as the 7th least prepared to manage the impacts of climate change.

Combined with infrequent earthquakes, climate-related disasters such as floods, flash floods, avalanches and heavy snowfalls on average affect over 200,000 people every year, causing massive losses of lives, livelihoods and properties. These interacting factors, particularly protracted conflicts which erode and challenge the ability to handle, adapt to and plan for climate change at individual and national levels, often turn climate change risks and hazards into disasters.

Although the country itself contributes only very little to global warming with regard to greenhouse gas emissions, droughts due to climate change affect and will affect Afghanistan to a high degree.

== Deforestation ==
A place in Zabul Province of Afghanistan

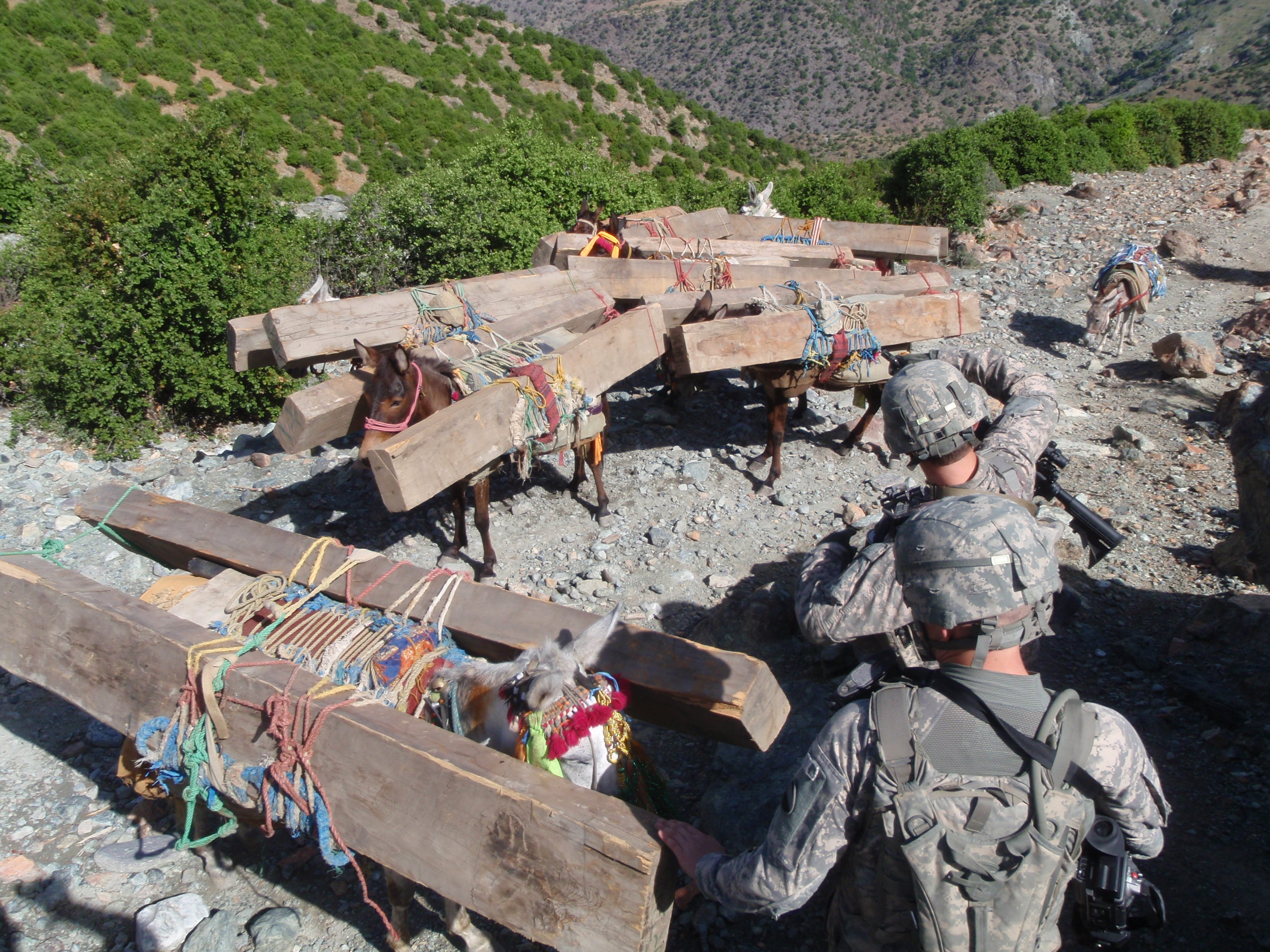
U.S. Army soldiers observing illegal timber smuggling in 2009, which has been commonly done through the Narang Valley of Kunar Province into neighboring Pakistan

Afghanistan has lost nearly half of its forests. About 2.8% of the country is believed to be forested, which amounts to nearly 2,000,000 ha (4,900,000 acres) of the land. Though some believe it may be less than that, forests can be increased significantly by planting more trees. Felling is illegal in all provinces of Afghanistan. This is because as forest cover decrease, the land becomes less and less productive, threatening the livelihood of the rural population, and the floods are washing the agricultural lands and destroying the houses. Loss of vegetation also creates a higher risk of floods, which not only endanger the people, but cause soil erosion and decrease the amount of land available for agriculture. To reverse this destruction, Afghans seek to turn their land green again by planting millions of trees every spring, particularly on 10 March, which is recognized as national tree plantation day in the country.

Afghanistan has a Forest Landscape Integrity Index mean score of 8.85/10, ranking it 15th globally out of 172 countries. Residents of the country have historically depended on forests for firewood and the revenue generated by export of pistachios and almonds, which grow in natural woodlands in the central and northern regions. The provinces of Badghis and Takhar have lost more than 50% of pistachio woodland.

Denser forests in the eastern Nangarhar, Kunar, Nuristan and other provinces are at risk from timber harvesting by timber mafia. Although the logging is illegal, profits from exporting the timber to neighboring Pakistan have been very high. The timber made its way not only to Peshawar but also to Islamabad, Rawalpindi, and Lahore, where most of it has been used to make expensive furniture. The Afghan government has formed special park rangers to monitor and stop these activities.

=== Tree cover extent and loss ===
Global Forest Watch publishes annual estimates of tree cover loss and 2000 tree cover extent derived from time-series analysis of Landsat satellite imagery in the Global Forest Change dataset. In this framework, tree cover refers to vegetation taller than 5 m (including natural forests and tree plantations), and tree cover loss is defined as the complete removal of tree cover canopy for a given year, regardless of cause.

For Afghanistan, country statistics report cumulative tree cover loss of 1,912 ha (19.12 km^{2}) from 2001 to 2024 (about 0.93% of its 2000 tree cover area). For tree cover density greater than 30%, country statistics report a 2000 tree cover extent of 205,771 ha (2,057.71 km^{2}). The charts and table below display this data. In simple terms, the annual loss number is the area where tree cover disappeared in that year, and the extent number shows what remains of the 2000 tree cover baseline after subtracting cumulative loss. Forest regrowth is not included in the dataset.

Annual tree cover loss in Afghanistan, 2001–2024. View chart definition.
Tree cover extent in 2000 minus cumulative tree cover loss in Afghanistan, 2001–2024 (loss-only residual; does not account for gain). View chart definition.

Annual tree cover extent and loss
Year	Tree cover extent (km2) (Note: This residual measure does not include forest regrowth.)	Annual tree cover loss (km2)
2001	2,056.83	0.88
2002	2,055.04	1.79
2003	2,052.60	2.44
2004	2,050.59	2.01
2005	2,048.23	2.36
2006	2,046.71	1.52
2007	2,044.18	2.53
2008	2,043.10	1.08
2009	2,042.40	0.70
2010	2,041.53	0.87
2011	2,040.40	1.13
2012	2,040.00	0.40
2013	2,039.99	0.01
2014	2,039.96	0.03
2015	2,039.96	0.00
2016	2,039.96	0.00
2017	2,039.96	0.00
2018	2,039.70	0.26
2019	2,039.52	0.18
2020	2,039.16	0.36
2021	2,038.90	0.26
2022	2,038.84	0.06
2023	2,038.69	0.15
2024	2,038.59	0.10

== Wildlife ==
Hunting is illegal in Afghanistan because much of the country's wildlife is at risk of being extinct. Exotic birds and wild animals continue to be smuggled out of the country. In 2014 around 5,000 birds were smuggled out of Afghanistan, which included falcons, hawks and geese. In 2006, Afghanistan and the Wildlife Conservation Society began a three-year project to protect wildlife and habitats in Band-e Amir National Park and Wakhan National Park.

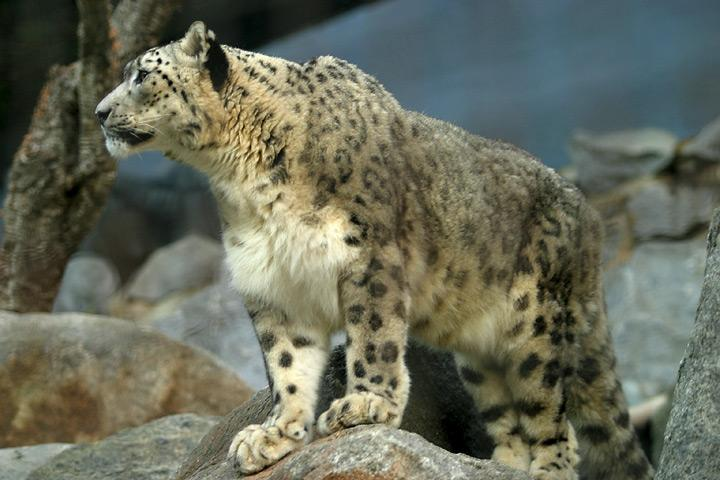
Snow leopard

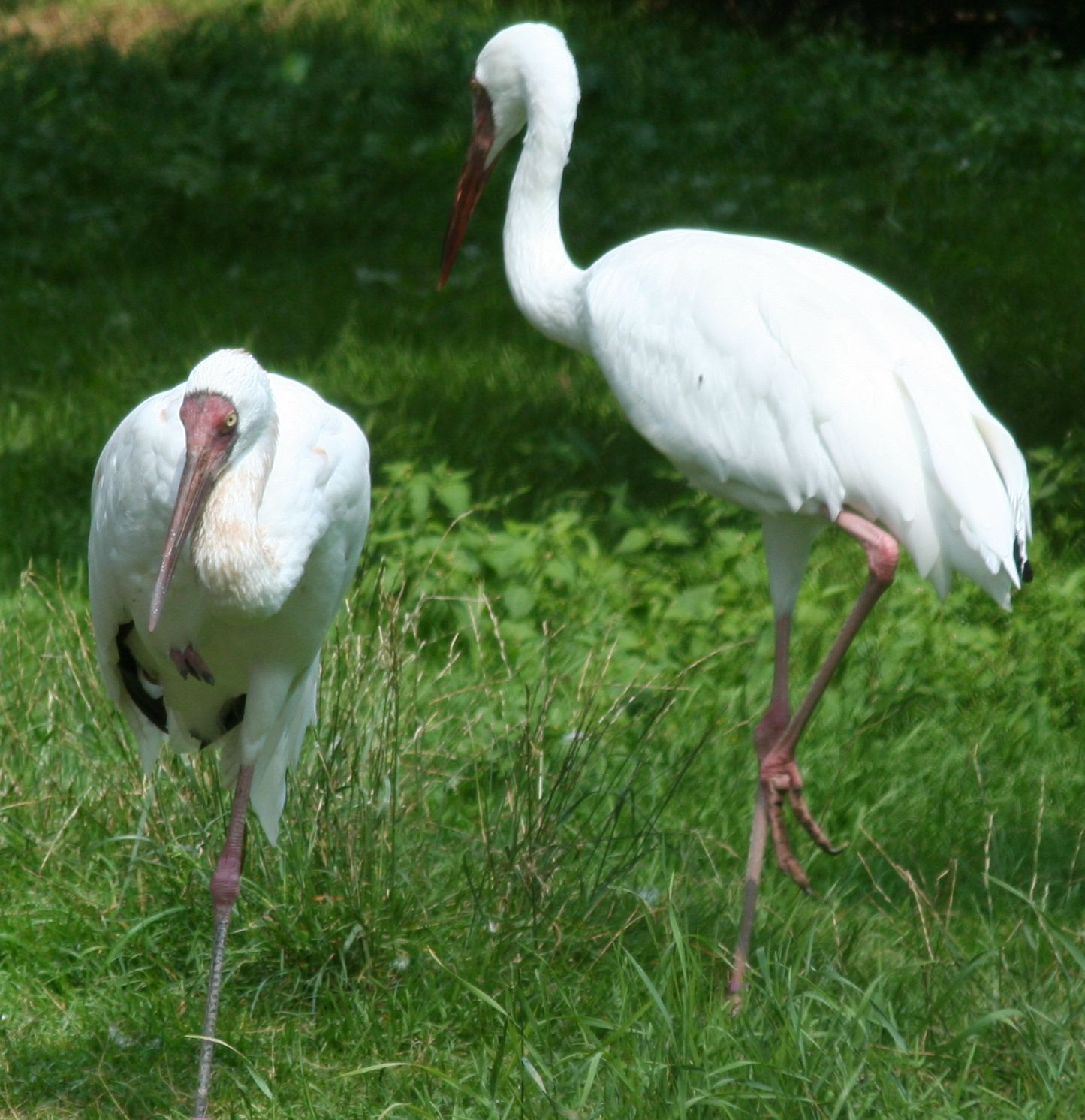
Siberian crane

=== Endangered species ===
- Asian black bear (Ursus thibetanus)
- Falcon
- Houbara bustard (Chlamydotis undulata)
- Marco Polo sheep (Ovis ammon polii)
- Markhor (Capra falconeri)
- Siberian crane (Grus leucogeranus)
- Snow leopard (Uncia uncia)
- Urial (Ovis orientalis)
- Wild goat (Capra aegagrus)

=== Critically endangered species ===
- Corn crake (Crex crex)
- Eastern imperial eagle (Aquilla heliaca)
- Greater spotted eagle (Aquilla clanga)
- Lesser kestrel (Falco naumanni)
- Marbled duck (Marmaronetta angustirostris)
- Pallas's fish eagle (Haliaeetus leucoryphus)
- Sociable lapwing (Vanellus gregaria)
- White-headed duck (Oxyura leucocephala)
- Yellow-eyed pigeon (Columba hodgsonii)

Little is known about the status of the salamander Batrachuperus mustersi, which is found only in the Hindu Kush.

== Water management ==
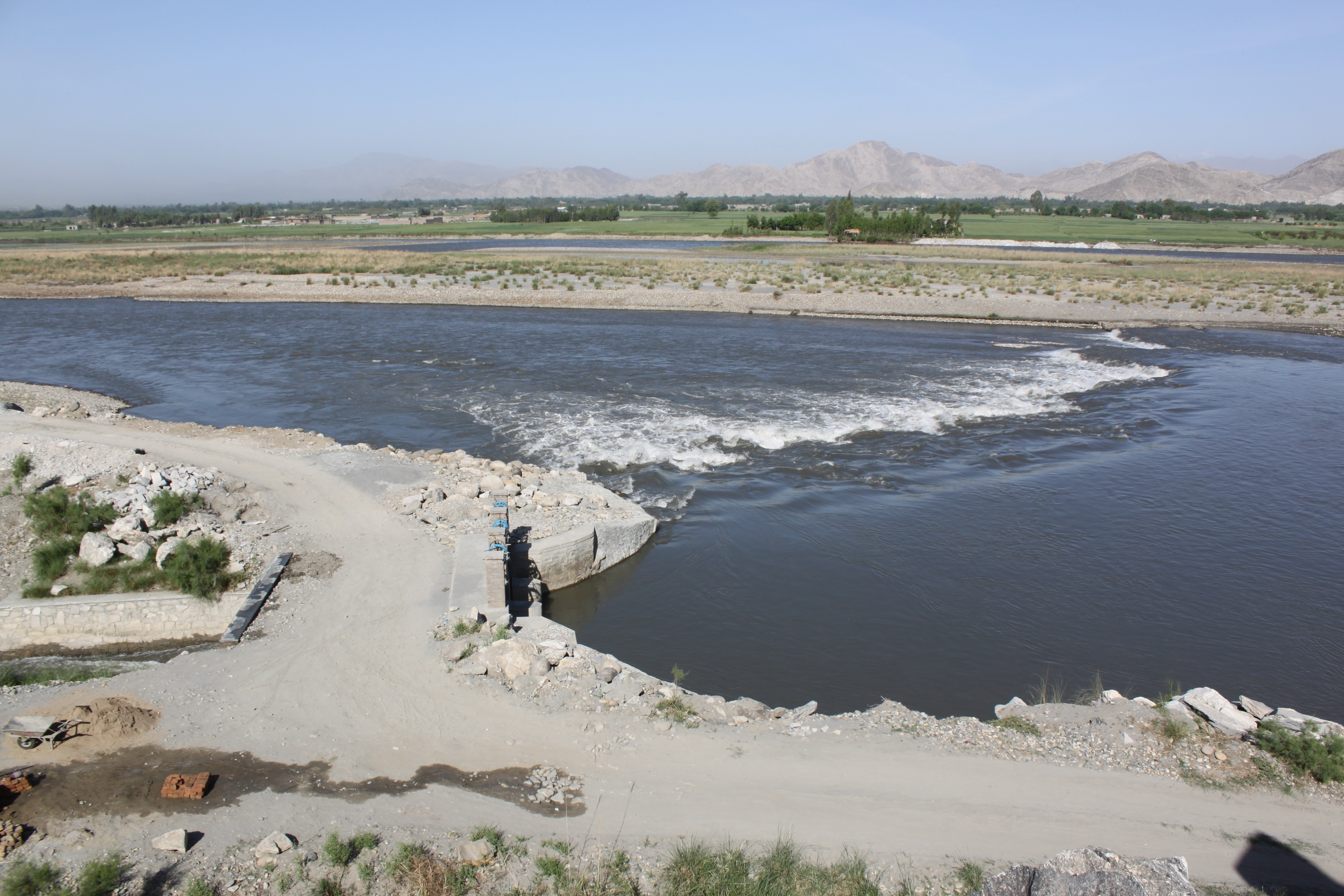
A bridge over a canal used for irrigation diverting water from a river

Most of Afghanistan's fresh water flow by fast-flowing rivers into neighboring countries. This benefits those countries but not Afghanistan. The primary threat to Afghanistan's water supply is the drought in parts of the country, which often creates food shortages and hunger. The resulting agricultural crises between 1995 and 2001 have driven many thousands of families from rural to urban areas.

In response to drought, deep wells for irrigation have been drilled which decreased the under ground water level, further draining groundwater resources, which rely on rain for replenishment. To fix these problems, more dams and reservoirs are being built all across the country.

Around 82% of Afghanistan's population has access to clean drinking water, with urban dwellers at 99%. Companies that provide drinking water to the public include Cristal, Alokozay, Noshaq, and others. Cristal is more expensive than the others but it is the cleanest and safest. Those that do not buy bottled drinking water rely on springs and mineral water from deep wells.

Between 1998 and 2003, about 99% of the Sistan wetlands were dry, another result of continued drought and lack of water management. The wetlands, an important habitat for breeding and migrant waterfowl including the dalmatian pelican and the marbled teal, have provided water for agricultural irrigation for at least 5,000 years. They are fed by the Helmand and Farah rivers, which ran at 98% below average in drought years between 2001 and 2003. As in other areas of the country, the loss of natural vegetation resulted in soil erosion; here, sandstorms submerged as many as 100 villages by 2003.

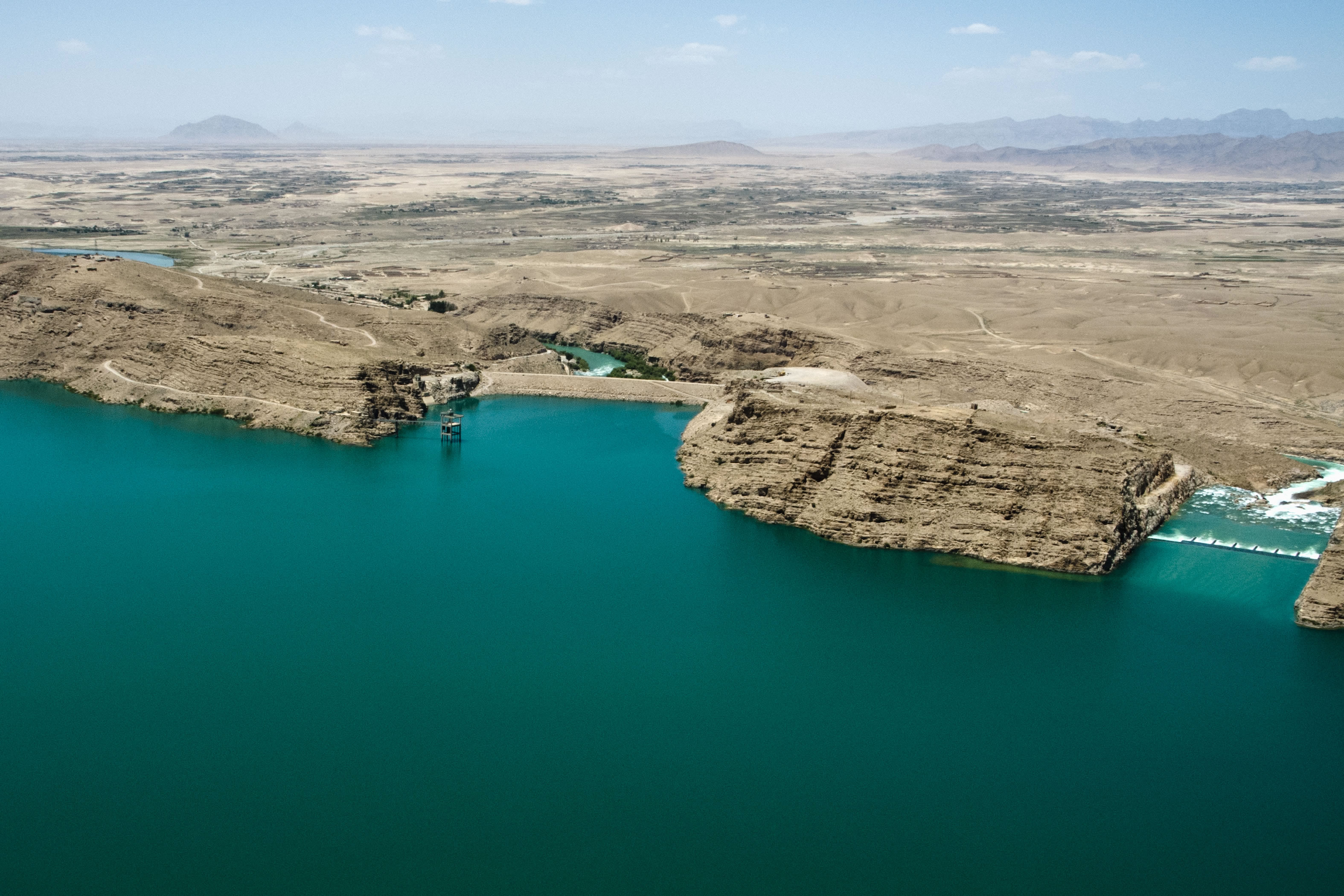
The Kajaki Dam in Helmand Province with its spillway (on the right)

Some of the major water reservoirs and dams include the following:

- Ab-i Istada in Nawa District of Ghazni Province
- Band-e Amir in Yakawlang District of Bamyan Province
- Chaqmaqtin Lake in Wakhan District of Badakhshan Province
- Dahla Dam in Shah Wali Kot District of Kandahar Province
- Darunta Dam in Nangarhar Province
- Hamun Lake in Chahar Burjak District of Nimruz Province
- Kajaki Dam in Kajaki District of Helmand Province
- Kamal Khan Dam in Chahar Burjak District of Nimruz Province
- Naghlu Dam in Surobi District of Kabul Province
- Pashdan Dam in Herat Province
- Qargha Dam in Kabul Province
- Salma Dam in Chishti Sharif District of Herat Province
- Sarda Dam in Andar District of Ghazni Province and Sharana District of Paktika Province
- Shah wa Arus Dam in Shakardara District of Kabul Province
- Sultan Dam in Jaghatu District of Ghazni Province
- Zorkul in Wakhan District of Badakhshan Province

== Pollution ==
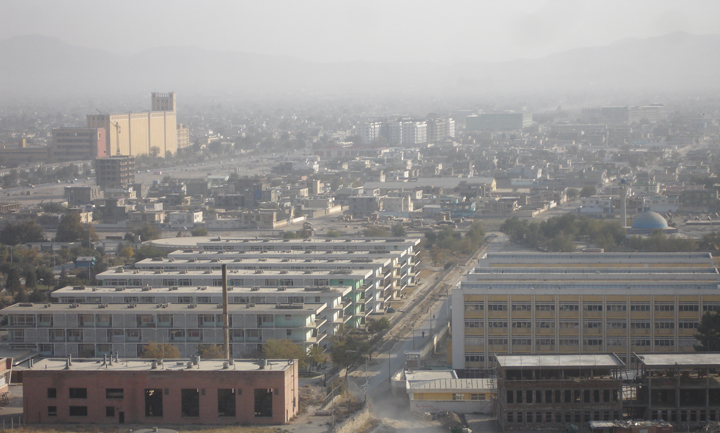
The city of Kabul has the highest air pollution in Afghanistan

Since 2021, nearly 7 million Afghan citizens that were residing in Iran, Pakistan, Turkey and other countries have returned to Afghanistan. Many of them settled in Herat, Jalalabad, Kabul, Kandahar, Khost, Mazar-i-Sharif and other Afghan cities.

=== Air pollution ===
Air pollution in Afghanistan's major cities is becoming a serious problem to public health. Residents of Kabul suffer the most from air pollution. Over 2,000 Kabul residents die from air pollution each year. One of the main reasons for this is the large number of old vehicles in the city. Nationally, an estimated 5,000 people die from air pollution. Old vehicles are also blamed for the air pollution in the other cities.

=== Domestic and industrial waste ===
Due to the decades of wars since 1978, Afghanistan was left behind in building a modern sewage system. Only some wastewater treatments have been built recently, including for farming purposes. Most of Kabul's sewage is collected by trucks from septic tanks and then dumped at nearby agricultural lands. Some homes have all their plumbing connected directly to storm drains. The water and waste from there eventually run into nearby Kabul and Paghman rivers.

=== Nuclear waste by Pakistan ===
In 2008, the Afghan government stated that it was investigating allegation that Pakistan had dumped nuclear waste in southern Afghanistan during the Taliban rule in the late 1990s.

== See also ==
- Environmental impacts of war in Afghanistan
- Geography of Afghanistan
