= List of dams and reservoirs in Afghanistan =

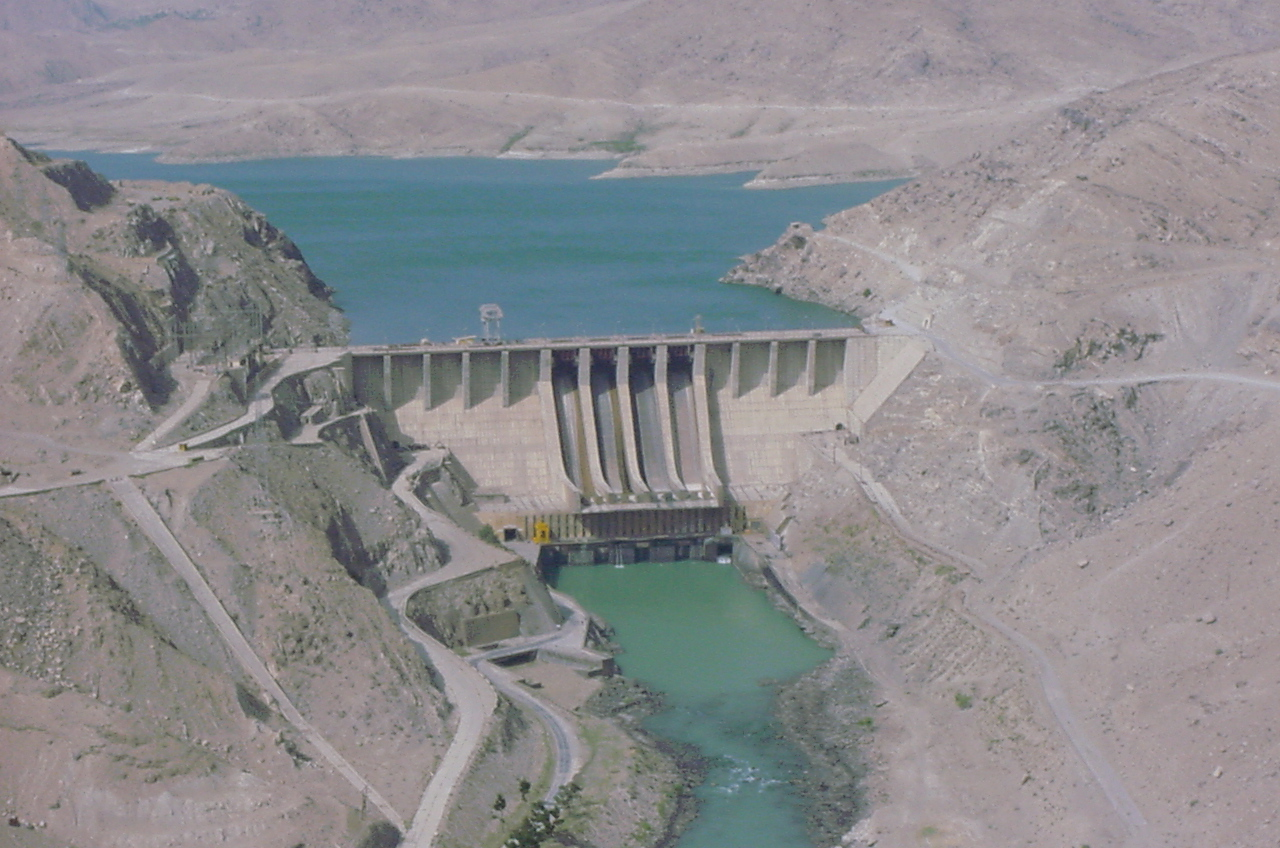
The Naghlu Dam in Kabul Province of Afghanistan

Dams and reservoirs in Afghanistan are used for irrigation, water supply, hydro-electric power generation or a combination of these. The Ministry of Energy and Water continues to build more dams.

== Location map of major dams and reservoirs in Afghanistan ==
Below is a map showing some of Afghanistan's major dams and reservoirs.

Some of the major dams and reservoirs in Afghanistan (clickable map)

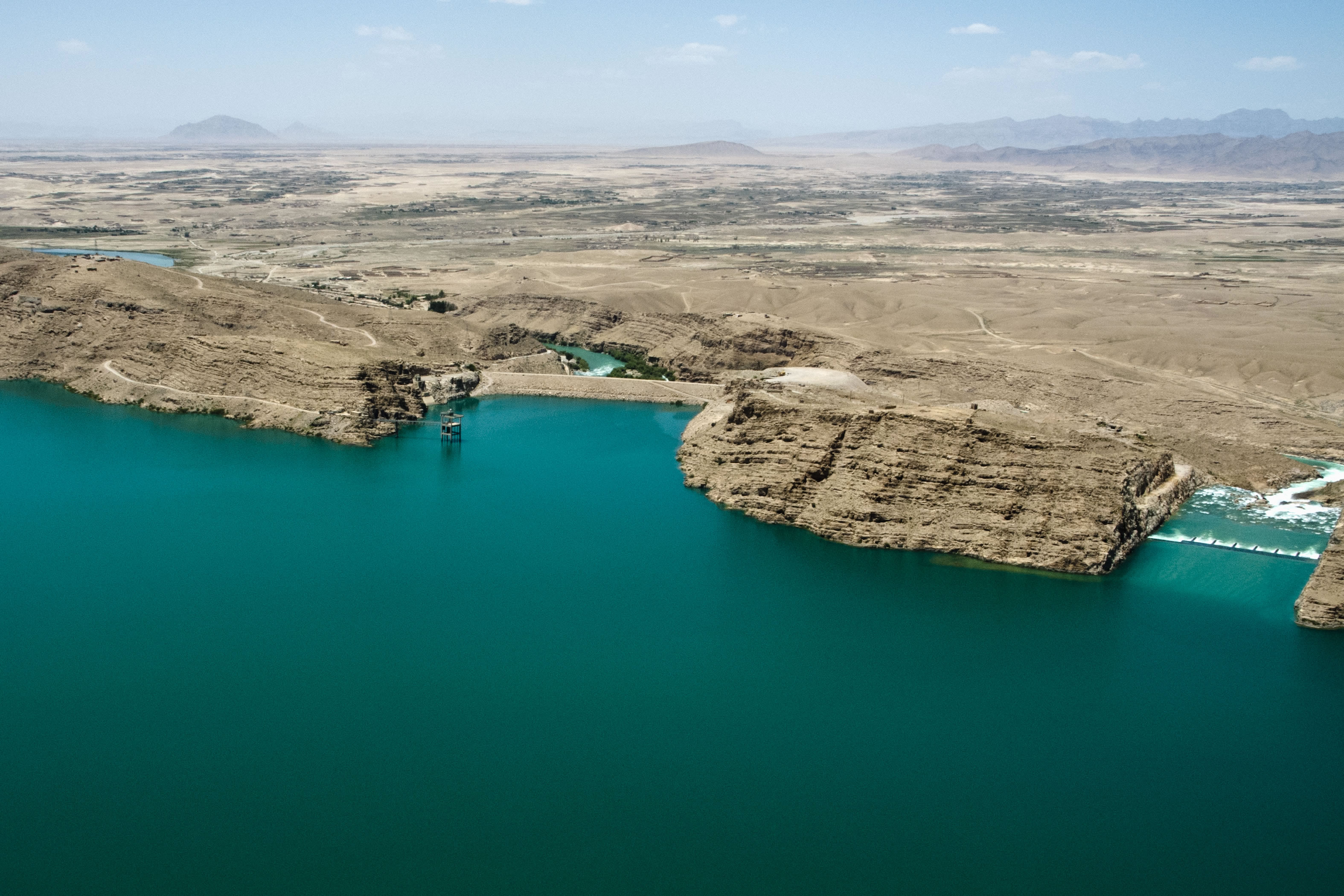
The Kajaki Dam and its spillway in Helmand Province

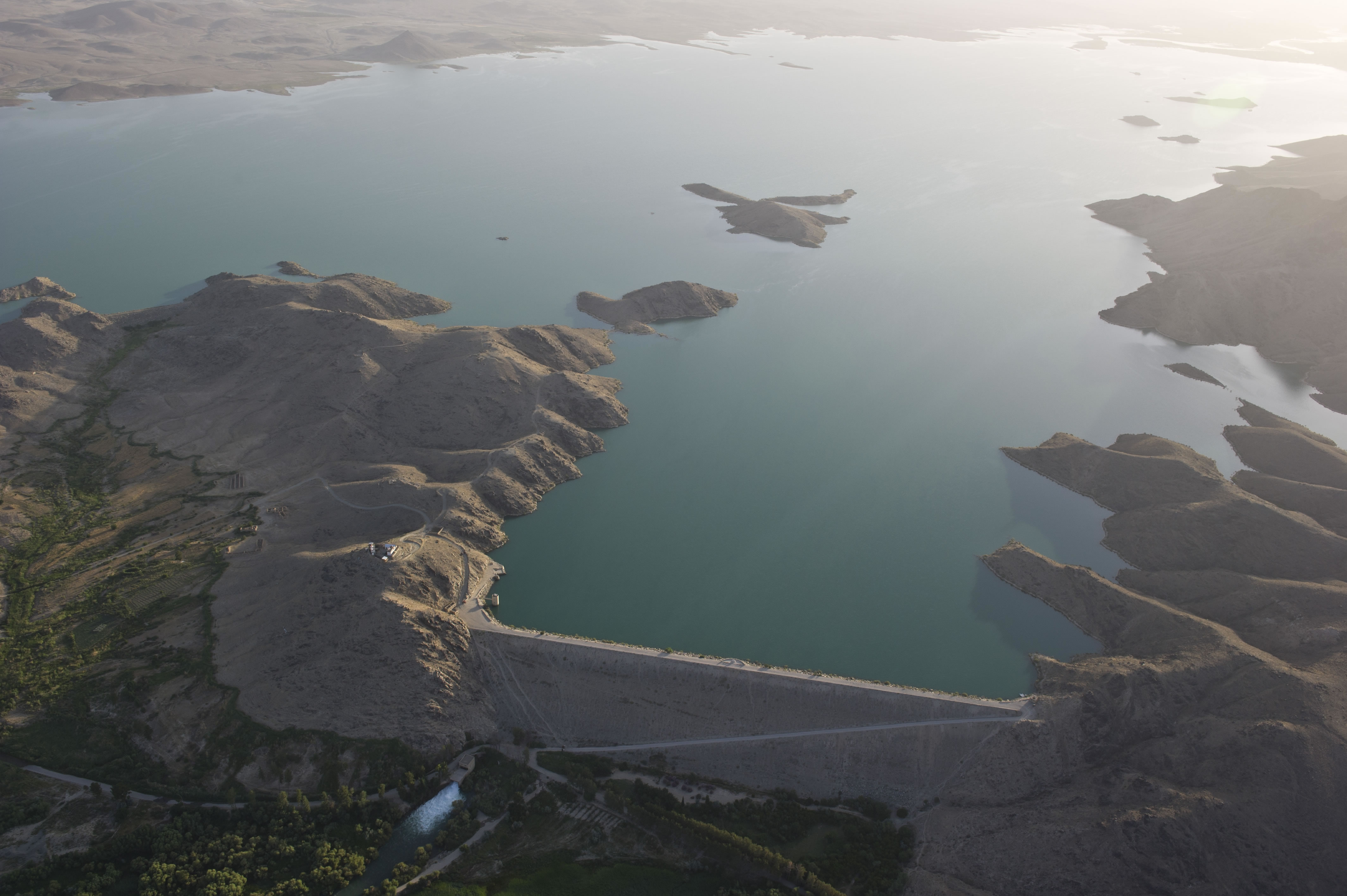
The Dahla Dam in Kandahar Province

== List of major dams and reservoirs in Afghanistan ==
Dam	Location	Impounds	Purpose	Dam type	Storage capacity	Height (m)	Length (m)	Power Gen.	Year completed	Ref.
Ayno Maina Dam	Kandahar, Kandahar Province		Irrigation	Embankment						
Band-e Amir	Bamyan Province		Irrigation	Embankment						
Bakhshabad Dam	Bala Buluk District, Farah Province	Farah River	Hydroelectricity, irrigation					27 MW	Under construction	
Chaki Wardak Dam	Chaki Wardak District, Maidan Wardak Province	Logar River	Irrigation						1938	Oldest modern dam
Dahla Dam	Shah Wali Kot District, Kandahar Province	Arghandab River	Irrigation	Embankment		55 m (180 ft)	535 m (1,755 ft)		1952	
Darunta Dam	Jalalabad, Nangarhar Province	Kabul River	Hydroelectricity, irrigation	Gravity				11.5 MW	1960	
Grishk Dam	Grishk District, Helmand Province	Helmand River	Hydroelectricity, irrigation	Embankment					1945	
Kajaki Dam	Kajaki District, Helmand Province	Helmand River	Hydroelectricity, irrigation	Embankment	1,715,000,000 m^{3} (1,390,373 acre⋅ft)	100 m (330 ft)	270 m (890 ft)	151 MW	1953	
Kamal Khan Dam	Chahar Burjak District, Nimruz Province	Helmand River	Hydroelectricity, irrigation	Embankment		16 m (52 ft)	2.274 km (1.413 mi)	9 MW	2021	
Machalgho Dam	Ahmad Aba District, Paktia Province		Hydroelectricity, irrigation					0.8 MW	Under construction	
Mahipar Dam	Kabul Province	Logar River	Hydroelectricity					66 MW	1967	
Miankoh Dam	Kandahar, Kandahar Province		Irrigation	Embankment	1,500,000 m (4,900,000 ft)	9 m (30 ft)	150 m (490 ft)		2024	
Naghlu Dam	Surobi District, Kabul Province	Kabul River	Hydroelectricity	Gravity	550,000,000 m^{3} (445,892 acre⋅ft)	110 m (360 ft)	280 m (920 ft)	100 MW	1968	
Nahr Gawkush Dam	Kunduz Province	Khanabad River	Hydroelectricity, irrigation	Gravity				10 MW		
Nawur Dam	Nawur District, Ghazni Province		Irrigation	Gravity						
Omari Dam	Qalat District, Zabul Province		Hydroelectricity, irrigation	Gravity	2,900,000 m^{3} (2,351 acre⋅ft)	25 m (82 ft)	70 m (230 ft)	0.1 MW	2024	
Paltuni Dam	Sharan District, Paktika Province	Gardez River	Hydroelectricity, irrigation	Embankment		30 m (98 ft)	260 m (850 ft)	1 MW	30% completed	
Pashdan Dam	Karukh District, Herat Province	Hari River	Hydroelectricity, irrigation	Embankment		42 m (138 ft)		2 MW	2025	
Qargha Dam	Kabul Province	Paghman River	Irrigation	Embankment	32,800,000 m^{3} (26,591 acre⋅ft)	30 m (98 ft)	450 m (1,480 ft)	N/A	1933	
Salma Dam	Chishti Sharif District, Herat Province	Hari River	Hydroelectricity, irrigation	Embankment	633,000,000 m^{3} (513,181 acre⋅ft)	107.5 m (353 ft)	551 m (1,808 ft)	42 MW	2016	
Sangjoy Solidarity Dam	Jaghori District, Ghazni Province		Hydroelectricity, irrigation	Gravity					Under construction	
Sarda Dam	Andar District, Ghazni Province	Gardez River	Irrigation	Embankment	259,000,000 m^{3} (209,975 acre⋅ft)			1967		
Shahtoot Dam	Char Asiab District, Kabul Province	Kabul River	Irrigation	Gravity					Under construction	
Shah wa Arus Dam	Shakardara District, Kabul Province	Shakardara River	Hydroelectricity, irrigation	Gravity	180,000 m^{3} (146 acre⋅ft)	75 m (246 ft)		1.2MW	2023	
Shorabak Dam	Fayzabad District, Badakhshan Province	Kokcha River	Hydroelectricity	Gravity				7.5 MW	2021	
Sukhtook Dam	Nili District, Daykundi Province	Lazier River	Hydroelectricity, irrigation	Gravity				0.7 MW	2021	
Sultan Dam	Zana Khan District, Ghazni Province	Ghazni River	Irrigation	Gravity					10th century	
Surkhab Dam	Logar Province									
Surobi Dam	Surobi District, Kabul Province	Kabul River	Hydroelectricity	Gravity				22.8MW		

== Major dams reported to be under construction in various parts of Afghanistan ==
- Agha Jan Dam in Uruzgan Province
- Baghdara Dam in Kapisa Province
- Dahan Dara Dam in Faryab Province
- Kahdanak Dam in Shindand District of Herat Province
- Kaj Samad Dam between Farah Province and Nimruz Province
- Kharwar Dam in Logar Province
- Kunar Dam in Surtak in Kunar Province
- Lawari Dam in Kandahar Province
- Manogi Power Dam in Kunar Province
- Sultan Ibrahim Dam in Sar-e Pol Province
- Two dams in Baghlan Province. One is named Pul-e-Khumri Dam.

== See also ==
- List of rivers of Afghanistan
- Water supply in Afghanistan
- Energy in Afghanistan
- International rankings of Afghanistan
- Environmental issues in Afghanistan
- List of tallest buildings and structures in Afghanistan
- List of megaprojects in Afghanistan
