= Water supply in Afghanistan =

Water supply and sanitation in Afghanistan
- The flag of Afghanistan (1931-2020)

Data
- Access to an improved water source: 82%; urban 99% (2022)
- Average urban water use (L/person/day): 90 for those with access to piped water in Kabul (2005);
- Average urban water and sanitation tariff (US$/m^{3}): 25 afghanis for metered connections; flat rate for unmetered connections (national tariff, in effect since November 2012)
- Annual investment in WSS: Unknown
- Share of tax-financing: None
- Share of external financing: Very high

Institutions
- Decentralization to municipalities: Yes
- National water and sanitation company: Ministry of Energy and Water
- Water and sanitation regulator: Holding company has regulatory functions
- Responsibility for policy setting: Ministry of Urban Development Affairs; Ministry of Rural Rehabilitation and Development
- No. of urban service providers: About 15
- No. of rural service providers: Thousands of community development councils

Water supply and sanitation in Afghanistan have greatly improved in the last two decades but more work is required to make the country's situation normal and safe. Major issues relating to water supply and sanitation are primarily resolved by the Ministry of Energy and Water and the Ministry of Rural Rehabilitation and Development, which are headquartered in Kabul, Afghanistan. All cities in the country have their own sanitation and water supply departments.

The nation's water supply is characterized by a number of achievements and challenges. Among the achievements are:

- the expansion of rural water supply infrastructure with the active participation of communities as part of the National Solidarity Program;
- the successful expansion of water supply in major cities; and
- a reform of the institutional framework for urban water supply through the decentralization of service provision from an ineffective national agency to local utilities managed on the basis of commercial principles.

Challenges include

- dilapidated infrastructure as a result of decades of war and neglect;
- a high level of non-revenue water estimated at 40% including water use from illegal connections; and
- the returning of millions of expats from Iran, Pakistan and other countries.

== Access and service quality ==
=== Overview ===
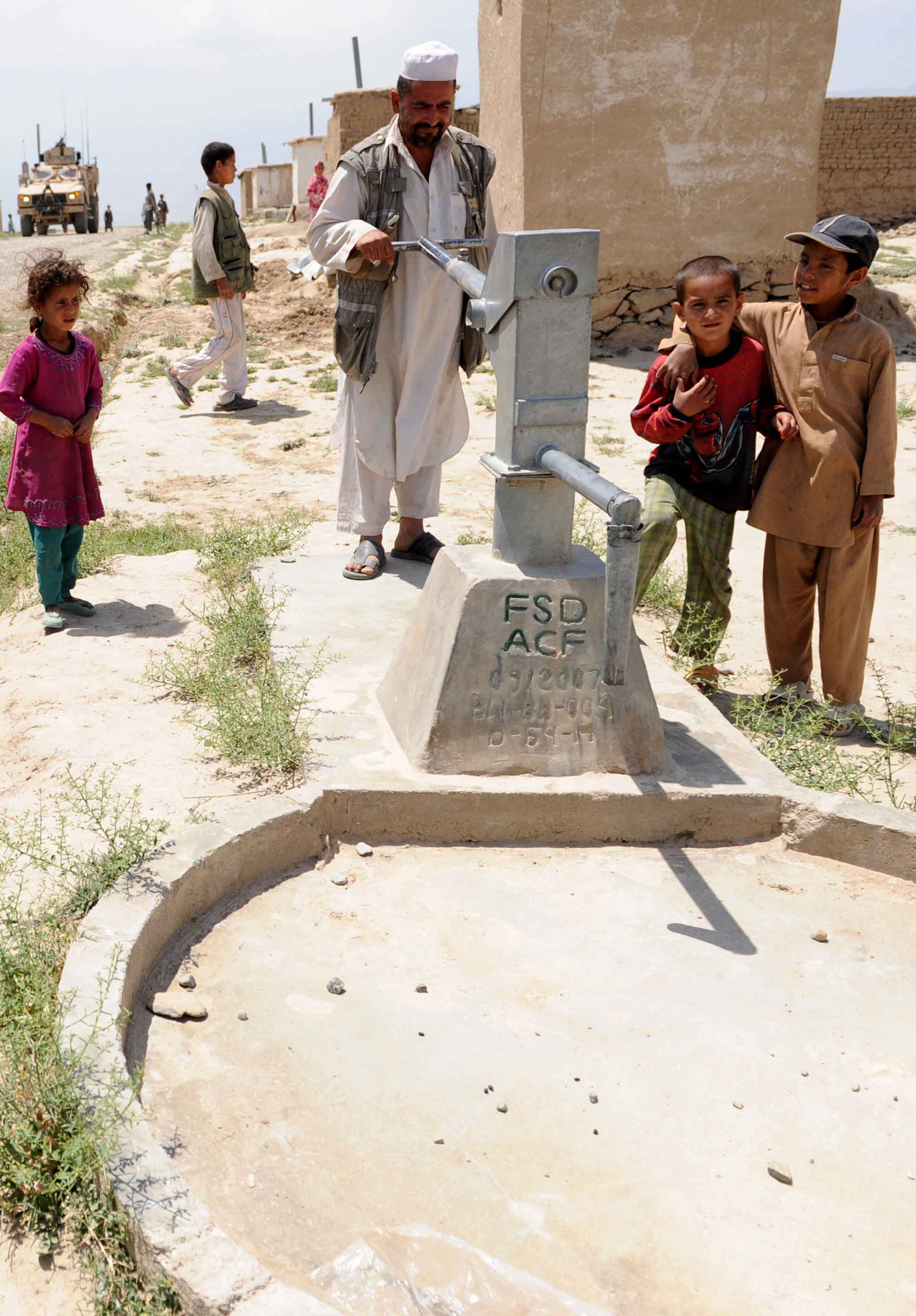
Villagers next to a hand pump in Parwan Province (2010)

Afghanistan has significant water resources. The country is able to store 75 billion cubic meters of fresh water annually. Over 82% of the country's population has access to clean drinking water, with urban dwellers at 99%. This number is expected to steadily increase in the future, especially in Kabul Province.

Major companies that provide bottled drinking water to the public include Alokozay, Aria, Cristal, Noshaq,, Pamir and others. The standard price is 10 afghanis for a 500ml (16.9 oz) bottle and 140 afghanis for a 5 gallon jug. Cristal is the most expensive followed by Alokozay and the others. Those that do not buy bottled drinking water rely on springs and mineral water from deep wells.

There have been considerable improvements in access to water supply in the last several years. A countrywide Multiple Indicator Cluster Survey carried out during the reign of the Taliban in 1997 found that an estimated 7% of the rural population and 17% of the urban population had access to an improved water source at the time. While the survey results represent estimates that have a certain margin of error, the recorded improvements in rural areas match the fact that significant investments were undertaken by non-governmental organizationss and government agencies under the National Solidarity Program initiated in 2003. The improvements in urban areas are somewhat puzzling, since no major investments in water supply systems took place during that period in Kabul and Kandahar. Possibly the 1997 figure does not include the urban population served by public wells. Furthermore, service quality is not reflected in the above figures. For example, because of poor electrical service, serious voltage fluctuations, poor installation of equipment and lack of preventive maintenance, pump failures have been frequent.

=== Badghis ===
Badghis Province has a number of water supply networks. It also has about 9 check dams. The Qadis Khordak Dam is currently under construction.

=== Baghlan ===
Baghlan Province has at least 10 recently-built water supply networks.

=== Balkh ===
Balkh Province has a number of check dams and water supply networks.

=== Daikundi ===
Daikundi Province has a number of check dams and water supply networks. It was reported in 2025 that around 50% of the population lacks access to clean drinking water. Many residents of Nili are forced to buy water at high prices. However, there are plans to fix the water shortage crises.

=== Farah ===
Farah Province has a number of check dams and water supply networks.

=== Ghazni ===
Ghazni Province has at least two major dams, the Sarda Dam in Andar District and the Sultan Dam in Jaghatu District. There are also many check dams throughout the province, such as the Sangjoy Dam and Zeerak Dam in Jaghori District. More are being built as of March 2026. A number of water supply networks exist in the province, particularly in its capital.

=== Ghor ===
Ghor Province has a number of water supply networks. There are also a number of check dams in the province. More are being built.

=== Helmand ===
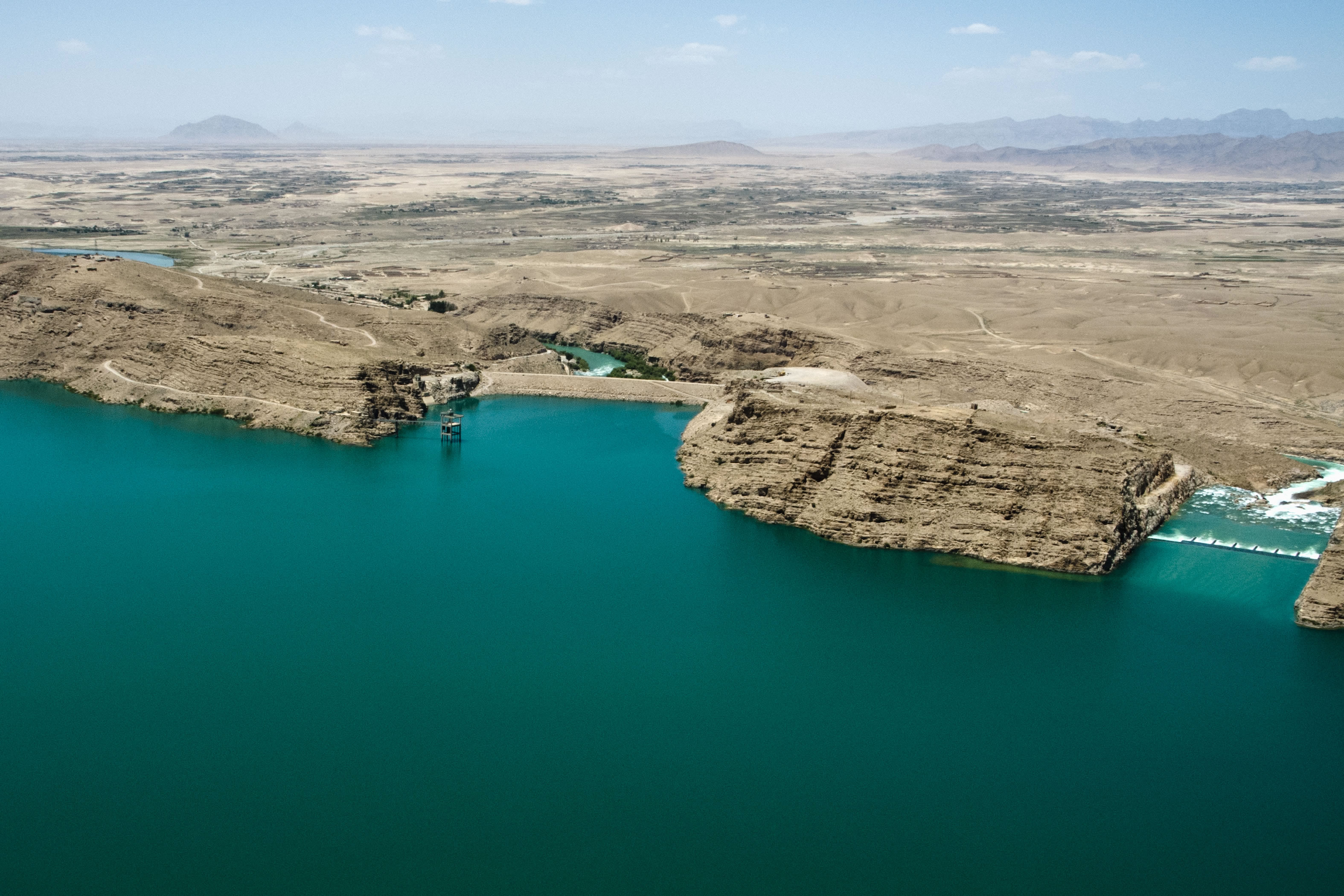
The Kajaki Dam in Helmand Province with its spillway (on the right)

Helmand Province has one major dam, the Kajaki Dam in the Kajaki District. There are also a number of check dams and water supply networks throughout the province. Most residents of Lashkargah rely on the Kajaki Dam for irrigation. It was announced in 2005 that a USAID-funded project would build six reservoirs in Lashkargah, with responsibility for the water supply then being handed over to the Helmand and Arghandab Valley Authority. The city had been without fresh water for the previous 30 years due to the contamination of the Helmand River.

=== Herat ===
Herat Province currently has two major dams, the Pashdan Dam in Karukh District and the Salma Dam in Chishti Sharif District. Its capital has more than 39,000 house connections, all of which are equipped with meters. About 45 percent of the population in the service area of the water company had access to piped water supply, including 85 percent in the city itself and around 30 percent in the surrounding areas. Since 2008, the local public water company – officially called a strategic business unit of the national water company - has been operating at a profit. The profit is reinvested in infrastructure. According to the German development agency GIZ, the service of the Herat water utility can be compared to similar set-ups in industrialized countries. With 105 employees in 2013 the water utility is not overstaffed; its ratio of 2.5 employees per 1,000 connections corresponds to international good practice. The utility receives its water from wells. About half the wells are within the city and the other half in the outskirts. Drinking water quality is not systematically monitored. According to a non-representative survey carried out in 2013, two-thirds of customers receive only intermittent water supply with interruptions of up to one and a half days, one third indicated that the amount of water received - 60 liter per capita per day on average - was insufficient, one third said that their water meters had not been read for at least the last six months, and almost all complained about insufficient water pressure. The water company collects only about 75 percent of the total amount of water billed. With German financing, a new well field, transmission line and storage facilities were completed in 2008. The additional water quantity allowed to quadruple the number of house connections between 2002 and 2012. The new well field has also improved water quality, according to residents surveyed. Households not connected to the piped network use shallow wells or water vendors.

=== Kabul ===
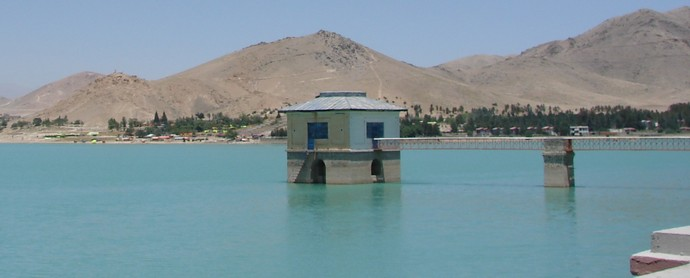
The Qargha Dam

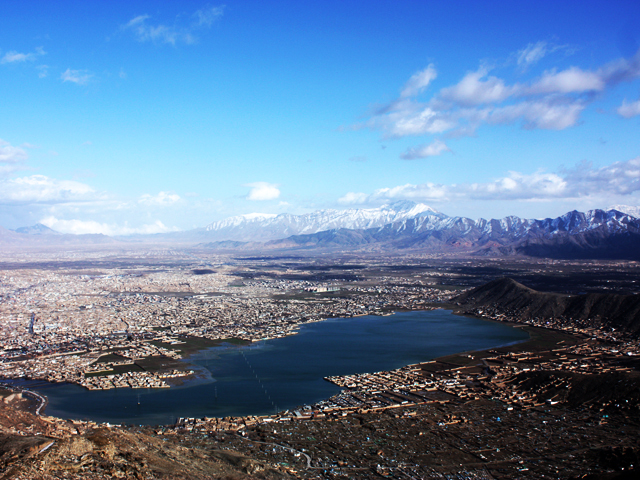
The Hashmat Khan Lake

The province of Kabul currently has a number of water supply networks that provide tap water to its residents. One such network is near the Kabul Polytechnic University, which provides tap water to thousands of Kabul homes and businesses. More water supply networks are being built.

According to a USGS study carried out from 2005 to 2007, about a quarter of shallow wells had fallen dry. The study stated that roughly 40% of the remaining wells could fall seasonally or permanently dry because of increased withdrawals, if they are not deepened. Reduced water availability because of the impacts of climate change could further exacerbate the situation.

The public tap water supply system provided about 60,000 cubic meter of water per day through separate piped networks in 2005 from three different sources:

- The Logar River aquifer southeast of the city;
- The Afshar well field drawing from the Paghman River aquifer to the west;
- The Alaudin well field drawing from the upper Kabul River aquifer to the south.

In addition, a small part of the city is connected to a distribution system served by the Qargha Dam. Water supply to those fortunate enough to be connected was about 100 liter per capita per-day, assuming 15 people per connection and one third of physical water losses in the distribution network. This per capita water use is almost as high as in Germany. However, water quality is poor, supply is intermittent and the great majority who do not have access to the piped network have to get by with much less water. The Kabul water project aimed at tripling the number of house connections to 90,000 and doubling water production from existing well fields as well as from a new well field on the lower Kabul River aquifer, providing water to more than 600,000 people.

=== Kandahar ===
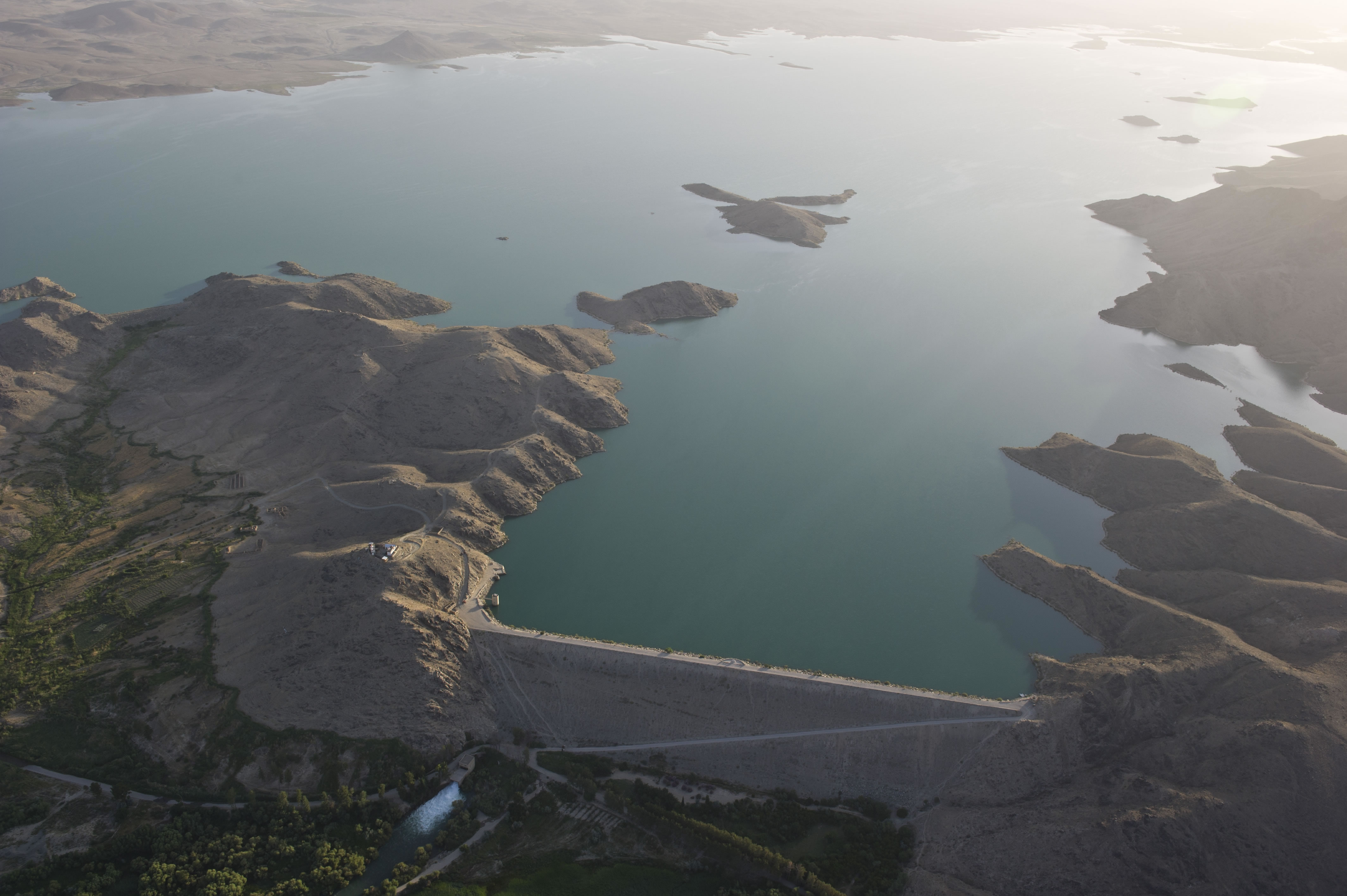
The Dahla Dam

Kandahar Province has a number of water supply networks. The province has one major dam, which is the Dahla Dam located in the Shah Wali Kot District. The province also has several check dams, such as the Ayno Maina Dam and Miankoh Dam. They are used for irrigation purposes.

In Kandahar there used to be only one network supplied by three or four deep wells. In 2002, it delivered only 2,500 cubic meter per-day to a city of nearly half a million. Most of the population depended on polluted shallow wells that were at risk of running dry. Today most homes have either a deep well or receive tap water from the Kandahar Urban Water Supply and Sewerage Department.

=== Khost ===
Khost Province has a number of check dams. There are also a number of water supply networks. More are being built as of October 2025.

=== Kunduz ===
In Kunduz Province water supply improved substantially since 2007. From April 2007 until December 2009 the number of connections increased from 370 to 2,100, providing piped water supply to about one third of the city. The network was expanded from 14 to 71 km (44 mi). A new computer-aided accounting system is being introduced to help increase the share of bills paid. In 2008, for the first time revenues covered operating costs. For irrigation purposes, residents of Kunduz rely on water from Kunduz River and Khanabad River.

=== Nimruz ===
Nimruz Province has long been affected by shortage of water. Most residents of Zaranj receive drinking water from the Kamal Khan Dam, which is located about 95 km (59 mi) to the southeast of the city in the Chahar Burjak District. Zaranj as the capital of Nimruz is gradually being replaced by Ghurghuri, which is located next to Khash River and Route 606 in the Khashrod District.

=== Zabul ===
Zabul Province has a number of check dams and water supply networks.

== Responsibility for water supply ==
=== Responsibilities within the government ===
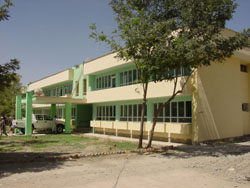
Ministry of Energy and Water in 2002

Policy setting and the channeling of resources provided by external donors for water supply investments is the responsibility of at least five Afghan Ministries.

- The Ministry of Energy and Water is responsible for water resources management.
- The Ministry of Urban Development Affairs is responsible for urban water supply.
- The Ministry of Rural Rehabilitation and Development is responsible for rural water supply.
- The Ministry of Finance has been, together with the Ministry of Rural Rehabilitation and Development, responsible for the National Solidarity Fund, which is the major program for rural water supply in the country.
- The Ministry of Public Health undertakes programs to train health professionals to educate the population about the importance of hygiene and clean water in preventing disease.

=== Service provision in urban areas ===
The government has a policy of creating decentralized local public utilities run on the basis of commercial principles. Prior to 2007 there was a Central Authority for Water Supply and Sewerage (CAWSS) with provincial water departments in the 14 Afghan towns that had piped water supply systems. The entity did not perform well and was not run on the basis of private sector principles. As part of sector reforms the agency was dissolved and replaced by the Afghan Water Supply and Sewerage Corporation (AUWSSC), a holding company for local utilities called "Strategic Business Units" that are to be run based on commercial principles.

There are few qualified technical staff due to low salaries and poor working environments. Most of the staff working on projects are funded by donors and leave once a project ends. However, there are encouraging exceptions. For example, a brother-and-sister team in the city of Ghazni increased revenue collection from water tariffs by 75%, aided by the fact that meters located within premises can only be read by a woman if no man is in the house.

=== Service provision in rural areas ===
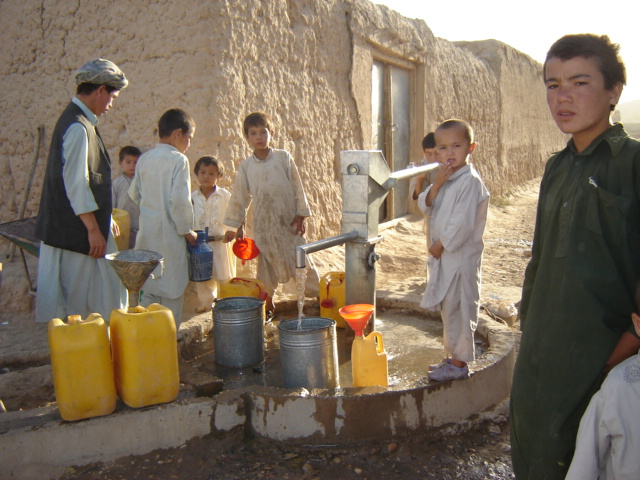
Hand pump providing water in Balkh Province in 2006

In the past non-governmental organizations played a major role in providing water supply and sanitation in rural areas of Afghanistan. In 2003, through the Ministry of Rural Rehabilitation and Development, the government began to play a role in rural water supply. It developed a "Rural Water Supply and Sanitation Policy/Strategy" for Afghanistan. The strategy emphasizes the integration of health and hygiene education with water supply and sanitation and gives local communities a key role. They are supposed to decide about the type of infrastructure to be installed, finance part of its investment costs, and to operate and maintain it. This is to be done through democratically elected Community Development Councils that have been created throughout Afghanistan since 2003 as part of the National Solidarity Programme. The councils receive so-called block grants and are themselves in charge of choosing what to do with the block grants and selecting the companies that install the infrastructure. About 22,000 councils have been created in all provinces of Afghanistan. About one quarter of the projects financed through the National Solidarity Programme were for water supply, sanitation and flood control, amounting to 11,700 projects with a value of US$157m financed between 2003 and 2010.

== External cooperation ==
The main external partners in the water sector have been Germany, the United States and the World Bank.

=== Germany ===
Germany has provided some financial cooperation through KfW development bank, as well as technical assistance through GIZ and the Federal Institute for Geosciences and Natural Resources, BGR. German cooperation in the water sector focused on urban areas, in particular on Kabul and Herat, as well as the provinces of Balkh, Kunduz, Takhar and Badakhshan. BGR supported groundwater monitoring and modeling in the Kabul basin as well as training of local partners from 2003 to 2006.

=== United States ===
Through USAID, the United States supported urban water supply through the Commercialization of Afghanistan Water and Sanitation Activity (CAWSA) project since 2008. USAID worked mainly in Mazar-e-Sharif, Gardez, Ghazni, and Jalalabad. From October 2009 until September 2012, USAID also funded the Afghan Sustainable Water Supply and Sanitation (SWSS) Project.

=== World Bank ===
The main vehicle for World Bank support to water supply in Afghanistan was the National Solidarity Programme, using funds from various countries channeled through the International Development Association or the Afghanistan Reconstruction Trust Fund. It was later to be replaced by a pilot project to support small private operators, connecting 500 customers in one area of Kabul.

== See also ==
- Drought in Afghanistan
- Health in Afghanistan
- List of dams and reservoirs in Afghanistan
- List of rivers in Afghanistan
