= Bakhshabad Dam =

Dam in Farah Province of Afghanistan

- Location within Afghanistan
- Country: Afghanistan
- Location: Bala Buluk District, Farah Province
- Coordinates: 32°52′57″N 62°49′15″E
- Purpose: Irrigation and electricity
- Construction began: 2023
- Construction cost: $430 million
- Owner: Ministry of Energy and Water

Dam and spillways
- Impounds: Farah River

The Bakhshabad Dam, referred to as Band-e Bakhshabad in Dari and Bakhshabad Band in Pashto, is located on the Farah River in the Bala Buluk District of Farah Province in western Afghanistan. The dam is currently under construction by the Ministry of Energy and Water with technical assistance of workers from Turkey and Germany.

After all work is completed, its power station will be able to produce up to 27 megawatts of electricity. The reservoir of the dam will store over 1,360 million cubic meters of water, which could irrigate up to 68,000 ha (170,000 acres) of agriculture land.

== See also ==
- List of dams and reservoirs in Afghanistan
- List of power stations in Afghanistan
