= Dara, Afghanistan =

- Location in Afghanistan
- Coordinates: 34°34′16″N 66°16′0″E
- Country: Afghanistan
- Province: Kabul Province
- District: Shakardara District
- Elevation: 7,431 ft (2,265 m)
- Time zone: UTC+4:30

Dara, Afghanistan is a village in Afghanistan, located in the mountains nearly midway between Herat and Kabul at 34° 16'N and 66°16 E Its mountainous location causes temperature variations from -20°c to 11 °C. most precipitation occurs in the Winter. The population is predominantly Hazara.

== See also ==
- Shakar Dara
- Momand Dara
- Anar Dara District
- Alim Dara
