= Omari Dam =

Dam in Zabul, Afghanistan

- Interactive map of Omari Dam
- Country: Afghanistan
- Location: Tori Village, Qalat District, Zabul Province
- Coordinates: 32°06′03″N 66°51′02″E
- Purpose: Irrigation and electricity
- Status: Operational
- Construction began: October 14, 2022
- Opening date: September 26, 2024
- Construction cost: 97 million afghanis
- Owner: Ministry of Energy and Water

Dam and spillways
- Type of dam: Gravity
- Height: 25 m (82 ft)
- Length: 70 m (230 ft)

Reservoir
- Total capacity: 2,900,000 m^{3} (100,000,000 cu ft)

Power Station
- Installed capacity: 100 kW (130 hp)

Omari Dam, originally called Tori Dam, is a gravity dam located in the Qalat District of Zabul Province in southern Afghanistan, about 6 km (3.7 mi) west of the center of Qalat.

Work on the project was prepared in May of 2021. Construction of the check dam was estimated to cost around 97 million afghanis. In August 2022 the Ministry of Energy and Water said most of the major work was done. The project was officially completed and inaugurated on September 26, 2024.

The length of the dam is 70 m (230 ft) and its width 25 m (82 ft). The reservoir can hold up to 2,900,000 m^{3} (100,000,000 cu ft) of water. It can irrigate around 600 acres of agricultural land and produce 100 kW (130 hp) of electricity.

== See also ==
- List of dams and reservoirs in Afghanistan
- Tourism in Afghanistan
