= Sanghi Takht =

- Location in Afghanistan
- Coordinates: 34°34′16″N 66°16′0″E
- Country: Afghanistan
- Province: Kabul Province
- District: Shakardara District
- Elevation: 7,431 ft (2,265 m)
- Time zone: UTC+4:30

Sanghi Takht is a village in Afghanistan, located midway between Herat and Kabul at 34° 16' 02" N and 66° 16' 30" E. Its mountainous location causes temperature variation from -20°c to 11°c. with most precipitation in Winter. The population is generally Hazari.
