= Surkhab Dam =

Dam in Logar Province of Afghanistan

Sorkhab Dam
- Location within Afghanistan
- Country: Afghanistan
- Location: Mohammad Agha District, Logar Province
- Coordinates: 34°08′28″N 69°13′12″E
- Purpose: Irrigation
- Status: Operational
- Construction began: 1930
- Owner: Ministry of Energy and Water

Dam and spillways
- Height: 40 m (130 ft)
- Length: 114 m (374 ft)
- Elevation at crest: 2,130 m (6,990 ft)

The Sorkhab Dam (Dari: Band-e Surkhab; Pashto: Surkhab Band) is located in the central part of Mohammad Agha District in Logar Province of Afghanistan. It is a gravity dam owned and maintained by the country's Ministry of Energy and Water. It has a height of 40 m (130 ft) and a length of 114 m (374 ft).

Originally built in the 1930s, the Sorkhab Dam is one of the largest sources of year-long water in Logar Province. It provides water for irrigation to around 2,000 ha (4,900 acres) of agricultural land. As of 2009, at least 3,500 farms in the province benefit from the dam.

== See also ==
- List of dams and reservoirs in Afghanistan
- Tourism in Afghanistan
