= Shakar Dara =

Shakardara
- Location in Afghanistan
- Coordinates: 34°41′0″N 68°59′0″E
- Country: Afghanistan
- Province: Kabul
- District: Shakardara
- Elevation: 7,431 ft (2,265 m)
- Time zone: UTC+04:30 (Afghanistan Time)

Shakardara is a town in the eastern part of Afghanistan, serving as the administrative center and main market area of Shakardara District of Kabul Province. It is located at 34.6833°N 68.9833°E and 2,265 m (7,431 ft) above sea level, and is connected by a road network with Kabul to the south and Charikar to the north. The main attraction in the area for tourists to see is the Shah wa Arus Dam.

== See also ==
- List of cities in Afghanistan
