= Shahtoot Dam =

Shahtoot Storage Dam
- Location within Afghanistan
- Location: Char Asiab District, Kabul Province, Afghanistan
- Coordinates: 34.43167°N 68.83417°E
- Construction cost: $236 million
- Operator: Afghanistan

Dam and spillways
- Type of dam: Gravity
- Height: 113 m (371 ft)
- Width (base): 60 m (197 ft)

Reservoir
- Total capacity: 250,000,000 m^{3} (202,678 acre⋅ft)

Shahtoot Dam is a proposed dam in the Char Asiab District of Kabul Province, in eastern Afghanistan. The establishment of the dam will provide drinking, irrigation and environmental water for the city of Kabul. The cost of this project is estimated to be about US$236 million. The feasibility study of the project cost $1.86 million, and was completed in 2012. The return on investing in the project would be about US$2 million per year. The dam will be constructed by engineers from India.

The Afghan Ministry of Energy and Water inked an agreement with the Poyab Company of Iran under which the Iranian firm would complete the design of Shahtoot dam. Speaking on the occasion, Ismail Khan said the Shahtoot dam will provide potable water to more than 2 million residents of Kabul, in addition to the irrigation of 4,000 hectares of land in Char Asiab and neighboring districts. The dam will also provide clean drinking water to the Deh Sabz District.

== Project impact ==
- Supply irrigation water for about 10,000 ha of existing agriculture land.
- Supply drinking water for around 2 million people in Kabul city.
- Provision of environmental flow in the river flowing in the Kabul city.
- Recharge of ground water for drinking purposes in Kabul ground water aquifer.
- Contribution to the national food security (production of more crops, fishery and industry) .
- Promotion of tourism industry
- Increase in the job opportunities and income.

== See also ==
- List of dams and reservoirs in Afghanistan
