= Mujeeb-ur-Rehman Omar =

Afghan Deputy Minister of Energy and Water

Mujeeb-ur-Rehman Omar مجیب الرحمن عمر

Deputy Minister of Energy and Water
- Incumbent
- Assumed office 21 September 2021 (Note: Acting: 21 September 2021 – 15 August 2025)
- Prime Minister: Mohammad Hassan Akhund
- Supreme Leader: Hibatullah Akhundzada

Personal details
- Party: Taliban
- Occupation: Politician, Taliban member

Mujeeb-ur-Rehman Omar is an Afghan Taliban politician who is serving as Deputy Minister of Energy and Water since 21-September 2021.
