= Pashdan Dam =

Dam in Herat Province of Afghanistan

- Location within Afghanistan
- Country: Afghanistan
- Location: Karukh District, Herat Province
- Coordinates: 34°24′19″N 62°25′25″E
- Purpose: Irrigation and electricity
- Status: Operational
- Construction began: 2011
- Opening date: August 14, 2025
- Construction cost: $117 million
- Owner: Ministry of Energy and Water

Dam and spillways
- Type of dam: Embankment

The Pashdan Dam, also known as Band-e Pashdan, is located about 15 km (9.3 mi) to the northeast of Herat, Afghanistan, in the Karukh District of Herat Province. It is an embankment dam with a 70 km (43 mi) canal network. Its power station became operational in 2025. The dam is capable of producing up to 2 megawatts of electricity and provide irrigation water to over 13,000 ha (32,000 acres) of agricultural land. Its reservoir can store up to 54 million cubic meters of water.

Work on the $117 million Pashdan Dam project began by Afghanistan's Ministry of Energy and Water in 2011, during the tenure of then-Minister Ismail Khan. After the project was completed, tourists from various parts of Afghanistan began visiting the area for leisure and pleasure purposes. It is the second-largest dam in Herat Province after the Salma Dam.

== See also ==
- List of dams and reservoirs in Afghanistan
- List of power stations in Afghanistan
- List of rivers of Afghanistan
- Tourism in Afghanistan
