= Karukh =

- Location in Afghanistan
- Coordinates: 34°29′32″N 62°35′32″E
- Country: Afghanistan
- Province: Herat Province
- District: Karukh District
- Elevation: 4,330 ft (1,320 m)
- Time zone: UTC+4:30

Karukh (Persian/Pashto: كرخ) is a town and the center of Karukh District, Herat Province, Afghanistan. The population is more than 18,800 people. The town is located at 1320 m altitude, 50 km northeast of Herat.
Karukh's busy bazaar is continuously mentioned in travelogues down through the centuries. The shrine of Alla Berdi, Sufi ul-Islam, stands there.

== Climate ==
With a mild and generally warm and temperate climate, Karukh features a hot-summer Mediterranean climate (Csa) under the Köppen climate classification. The average temperature in Karukh is 13.1 °C, while the annual precipitation averages 301 mm.

July is the hottest month of the year with an average temperature of 24.9 °C. The coldest month January has an average temperature of 0.7 °C.

Climate data for Karukh
Month	Jan	Feb	Mar	Apr	May	Jun	Jul	Aug	Sep	Oct	Nov	Dec	Year
Mean daily maximum °C (°F)	6.7 (44.1)	8.5 (47.3)	14.7 (58.5)	20.0 (68.0)	25.8 (78.4)	31.1 (88.0)	33.0 (91.4)	31.9 (89.4)	27.8 (82.0)	21.9 (71.4)	14.8 (58.6)	9.7 (49.5)	20.5 (68.9)
Daily mean °C (°F)	0.7 (33.3)	2.8 (37.0)	8.3 (46.9)	13.3 (55.9)	18.1 (64.6)	22.8 (73.0)	24.9 (76.8)	23.7 (74.7)	18.8 (65.8)	13.2 (55.8)	7.2 (45.0)	3.4 (38.1)	13.1 (55.6)
Mean daily minimum °C (°F)	−5.2 (22.6)	−2.8 (27.0)	1.9 (35.4)	6.6 (43.9)	10.4 (50.7)	14.5 (58.1)	16.9 (62.4)	15.5 (59.9)	9.8 (49.6)	4.5 (40.1)	−0.4 (31.3)	−2.9 (26.8)	5.7 (42.3)
Source: Climate-Data.org

== Notable people ==
- Rangin Dadfar Spanta
- Abul Fath Al-Karukhi (d.~1153) - a prominent transmitter of Sunan Tirmithi
