= Environmental impacts of war in Afghanistan =

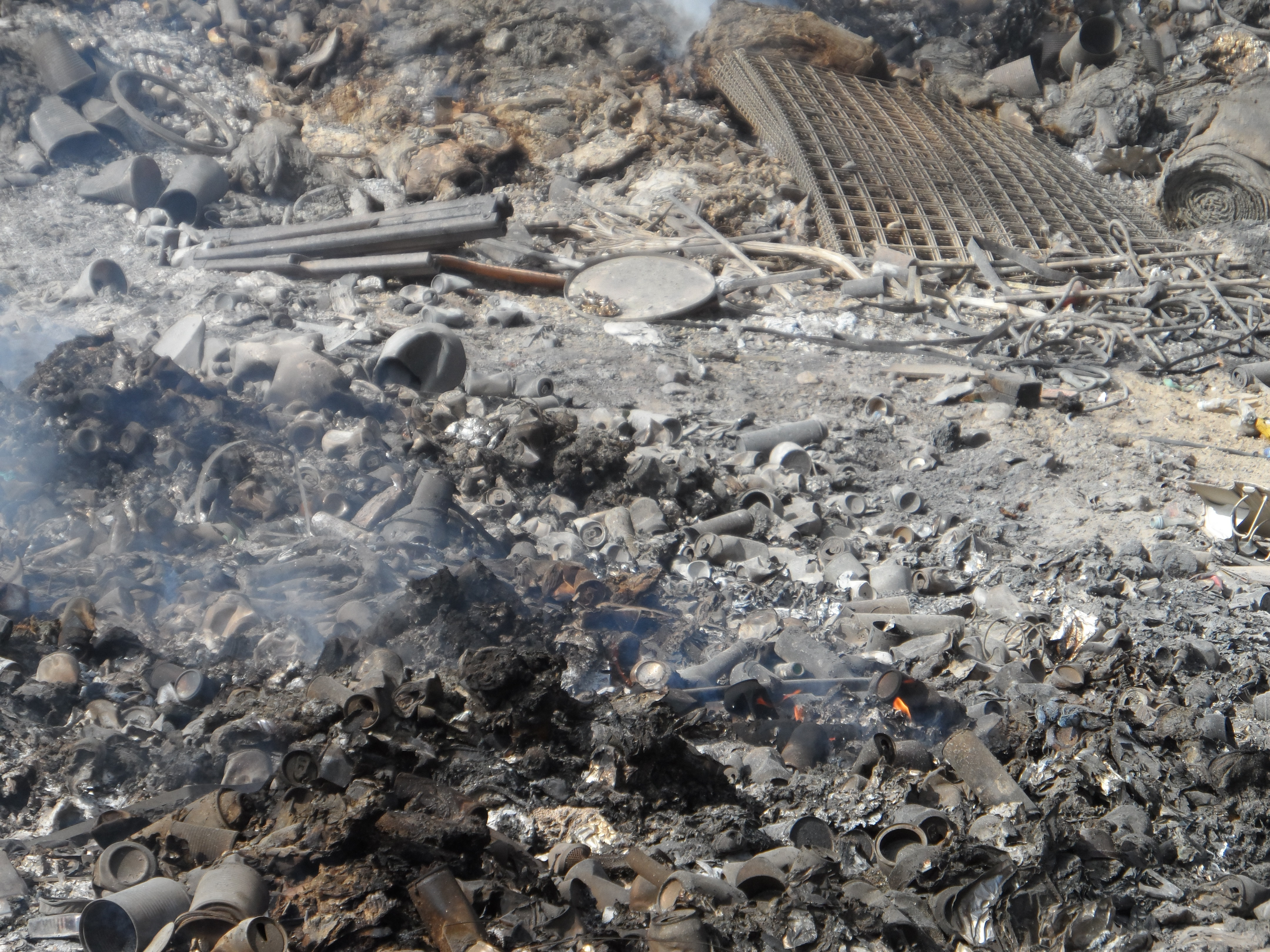
Open-air burn pit at Forward Operating Base Sharana, Paktika, Afghanistan, in 2013

The ongoing environmental impacts of war in Afghanistan, from the 1979 beginning of the Soviet-Afghan War to the 2021 United States' withdrawal from Afghanistan, adversely affect the health of Afghan civilians and American veterans, infrastructure, the labour force, and social structures. Environmental impacts involve but are not limited to the open-air burn pits of the United States Department of Defense (DoD) and the degradation of traditional irrigation systems. The burn pits produced hazardous emissions inconclusively linked to later appearances of chronic and sometimes fatal illness. Irrigation impacts—significant due to the dryness of the land—have been catalyzed by military activity and the societal effects of conflict; they have contributed to the rise of Afghan opium production.

== Open-air burn pits ==
Open-pit burning was the dominant method used by the DoD to dispose of waste from their military bases in the US War in Afghanistan until 2013. Trash was set afire on open fields using JP-8 jet fuel and diesel as propellants. The open-air burn pits were unregulated and unmonitored. Waste consisted of materials that the DoD had deemed as hazardous and prohibited, including plastics, aerosol cans, tires, metals, and batteries. In 2010, the DoD was burning approximately 12 700 kilograms of waste from Forward Operating Base Salerno daily, among 184 burn pits. Their burning, in proximity to Afghan communities and farmland, produced toxic fumes containing volatile organic compounds (VOCs), particulate matter (PM), polycyclic aromatic hydrocarbons (PAHs), dioxins, and acrolein, contaminating air, food crops, and waterways, leading to external, inhalation, or ingestion exposure. Immediate effects included skin, eye, and throat irritation or pain and difficulty breathing. Long-term exposure has been associated with lung damage, neurological disorders, cancer, respiratory, cardiovascular, and autoimmune diseases, although causal links remain inconclusive due to limited data. The severe and long-term health outcomes associated with open-pit burning for Afghan civilians and US military veterans have been likened to the effects of Agent Orange in the Vietnam War.

== Irrigation systems ==
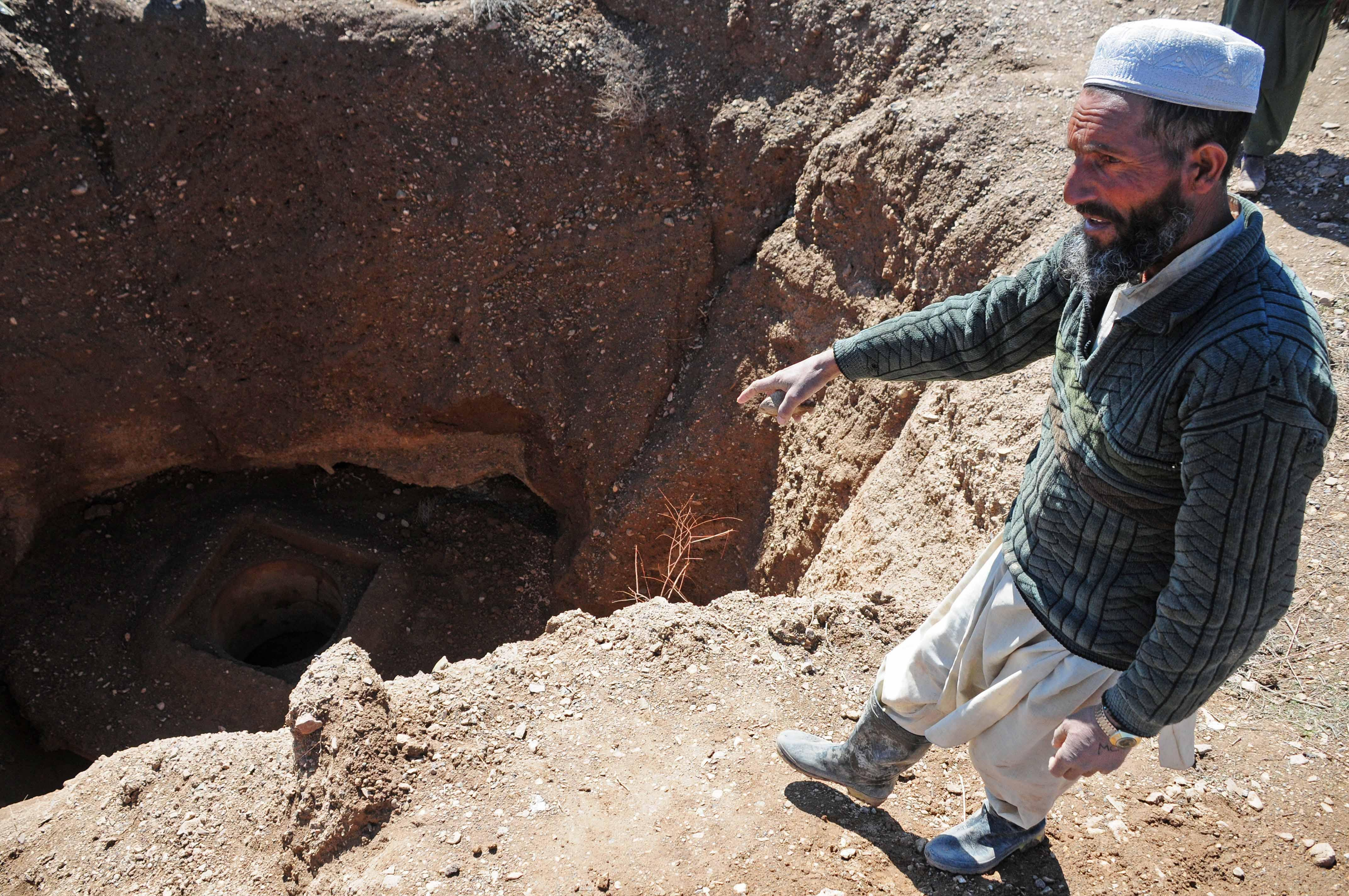
A collapsed karez on Shindand Air Base, Herat, Afghanistan, in 2010

Between 1979, the time of the Soviet invasion and 2014, the end of the International Security Assistance Force in Afghanistan, hectares of irrigated land declined by 40%. The failure of irrigation systems can be attributed to the physical destruction and social, economic, and political consequences of wars in this period. Irrigation operation and maintenance were once a part of a collective and communal system of labour, governed by the mirab, a part of traditional irrigation governance. However, erosion of social relations due to tension and distrust produced in conflict and Mujahideen followed by Taliban insurgent control have impaired the governance system. The institutional and economic collapse has been particularly disruptive given the labour and financial intensiveness of traditional irrigation systems such as the karez. This collapse, and the violence, have also driven migration away from karez systems, which are located in rural areas, diminishing the transmission of irrigation knowledge. Furthermore, karez tunnels have been damaged by blasting in the Soviet and Afghan militaries' underground warfare, US military bases constructed atop them, and Soviet destruction of the countryside—where insurgencies originated.

=== Opium cultivation ===
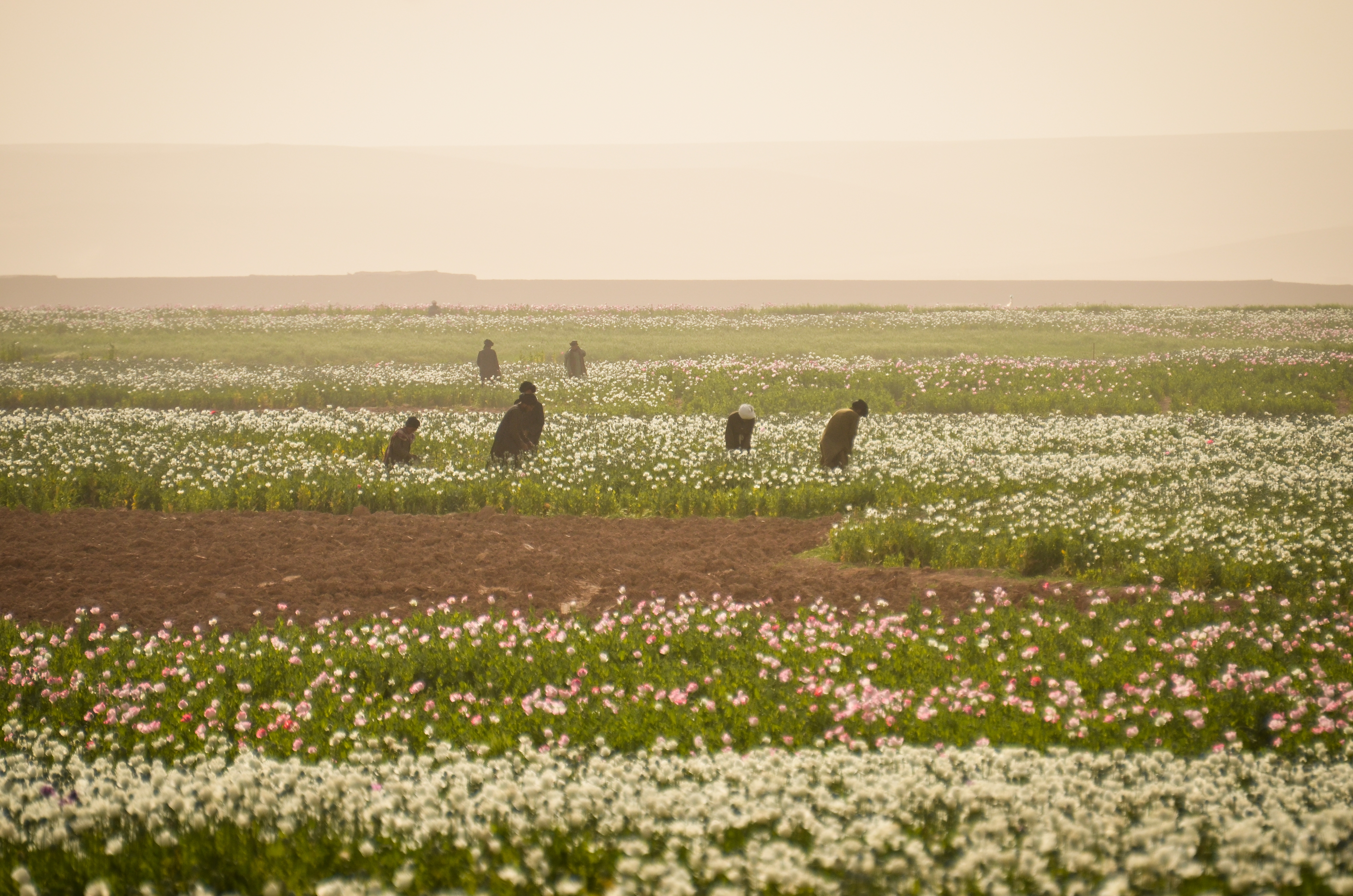
Farmers cultivating a field of poppies south of Forward Operating Base Shir Ghazi, Helmand, Afghanistan, in 2012

The dilapidated irrigation systems are a part of a constellation of environmental factors which have, in part, driven the boom of opium production in Afghanistan beginning at the time of the Soviet invasion. The lack of irrigation, in combination with the Soviet destruction of orchards and farmland, the irrigation dependency of over 70% of Afghan crops due to the aridness of the region, and increasingly severe drought have caused wheat, cereal crop, and pasture failure. These consequences have given rise to food insecurity and losses of livestock and livelihood. The resultant debt, paired with the dominance of agriculture in the Afghan economy and the inequity and economic instability imparted by war, has incentivized farmers to shift from livestock to poppy farming. Poppies are hardier, requiring approximately 80% less water than licit crops, and have an assured value on the global market. Thus, farmers accredit poppy cultivation for their ability to keep their land.

== See also ==
- Afghanistan conflict (1978–present)
- United States invasion of Afghanistan
- Environmental issues in Afghanistan
- Environmental impact of war
- Environmental impact of the Gulf wars
