= Kamal Khan Dam =

Hydroelectric and irrigation dam in Afghanistan

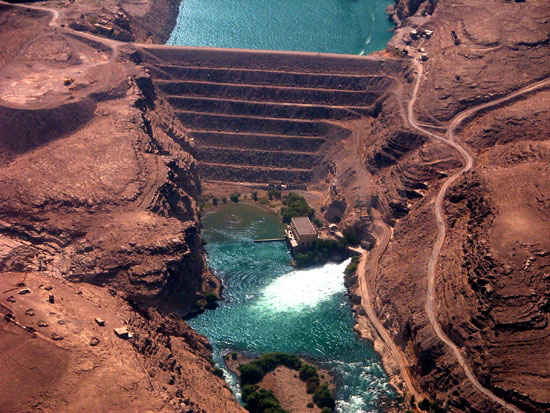

- Location within Afghanistan
- Country: Afghanistan
- Location: Chahar Burjak District, Nimruz Province
- Coordinates: 30.323984°N 61.88337730°E
- Purpose: Irrigation and hydroelectricity
- Status: Completed
- Construction began: 1974
- Opening date: 24 March 2021
- Construction cost: $78-85 million
- Owner: Ministry of Energy and Water
- Operators: Ministry of Energy and Water

Dam and spillways
- Type of dam: Gravity
- Impounds: Helmand River
- Height: 16 m (52 ft)
- Length: 2.274 km (1.413 mi) (main dam)
- Elevation at crest: 532 m (1,745 ft)
- Width (crest): 9 m (30 ft) (changing)
- Width (base): 90 m (300 ft) (changing)
- Spillway type: Ogee

Reservoir
- Total capacity: 52,000,000 m^{3} (1.8×10^{9} cu ft)

Power Station
- Annual generation: 9 GWh

Kamal Khan Dam (Dari: بند کمال خان; Pashto: کمال خان بند) is a gravity dam in the Nimruz Province of Afghanistan, which is owned and operated by the nation's Ministry of Energy and Water. It is located on the Helmand River in the Chahar Burjak District of the province, about 95 km (59 mi) southeast of Zaranj. Its power station produces up to 9 MW of hydroelectricity in addition to providing irrigation to about 175,000 ha (430,000 acres) of agricultural land. Its reservoir has the capacity to store up to 52 million cubic meters of fresh water.

== History ==
Work on the Kamal Khan Dam originally began in 1974, but after the 1978 Saur Revolution the project was abandoned. It resumed in 2017 during the Presidency of Ashraf Ghani. The first phase of the project began on 19 April 2017. The second phase in March of 2021, and its third and final phase in February of 2025.

Under the 1973 Helmand River water-sharing treaty, Afghanistan provides to neighboring Iran up to 850 million cubic meters of water annually through the Kamal Khan Dam.

== See also ==
- List of dams and reservoirs in Afghanistan
- List of rivers of Afghanistan
- Water supply in Afghanistan
