= Drought in Afghanistan =

There have been several seasons of drought in Afghanistan in recent decades. According to an analysis of climate and drought records by the Asia Development Bank, localized droughts have a periodicity of three to five years, and droughts covering large areas recur every 9-11 years. There is evidence for increased severity of droughts since the 1940s, and especially since the 1990s.

Afghanistan began experiencing unusual droughts starting in 1995, right after the Taliban emerged. It remained this way until heavy snow fell in the 2002–03 winter season, after the new Karzai administration took over. This relief did not last long as the country began to see more droughts in the coming years.

Drought and conflict have created internally displaced populations living in extremely poor conditions. Many communities depend on meager incomes from migrating outside their farmlands. Inadequate rains and snowfall during 2008 to 2010 caused significant failure of rainfed crops in six provinces: Herat, Jowzjan, Balkh, Badghis, Faryab and Sar-e Pol. The situation affected the most vulnerable populations and their access to food and water, reducing communities' health and nutrition status. In 2012, Afghanistan's long drought ended due to heavy snow.

== See ==
- Environmental issues in Afghanistan
- Water supply in Afghanistan
