= Alim Dara =

Alim Dara is a village in Afghanistan that had earlier been the first stopping point on the road from Talikhan to Faizabad, Uttar Pradesh, India. At the turn of the twentieth century, it was said to house a permanent population of about 300 families. The area also included at the time cultivation, a stream, and canals.
