= Shah wa Arus Dam =

- Location within Afghanistan
- Location: Shakardara District, Kabul Province, Afghanistan
- Coordinates: 34.688028°N 69.019386°E
- Construction began: 2014
- Opening date: December 31, 2024
- Construction cost: $53 million
- Owner: Ministry of Energy and Water
- Operator: National Water Affairs Regulation Authority

Dam and spillways
- Type of dam: Gravity
- Impounds: Shakardara River
- Height: 77 m (253 ft)
- Length: 250 m (820 ft)
- Width (base): 60 m (200 ft)

Reservoir
- Total capacity: 180,000 m^{3} (146 acre⋅ft)

Power Station
- Commission date: 2016
- Turbines: 2 x 600 KW
- Installed capacity: 1.2MW

The Shah wa Arus Dam (Dari: بند شاه عروس; Pashto: د شاه و عروس بند) is located in the Shakardara District of Kabul Province in Afghanistan, about 20 mi (32 km) northwest of the capital Kabul. It is a gravity dam with approximately 20 m (66 ft) wide spillway. The height of the dam is 77 m (253 ft) and its width is 60 m (200 ft).

The Shah wa Arus Dam provides irrigation water to 3,500 ha (8,600 acres) of land. Its power station can produce up to 1.2 megawatts (MW) of electricity. The site attracts many local and national tourists.

== History ==
Construction of Shah wa Arus Dam has long been proposed by Afghanistan's Ministry of Energy and Water. The bidding deadline for the dam construction was 24 March 2014, when an Iranian company known as Tablieh-Parhoon Tarh Joint Venture was chosen as the main contractor for the project. It was to build the Shah-wa-Arus irrigation and hydropower project, which included a rock-filled dam, intake, powerhouse, pickup weir with balancing reservoir and head regulators, and right and left side main canals. The designing of the dam was awarded to Alborz Sazeh Company.

The total cost of Shah wa Arus Dam came to around $53 million, with 77 meters height at the rocky base and about 330,000 cubic meters of concrete. The overall project was completed in December 2024, which had created jobs for around 500 Afghans.

The Shah-wa-Arus Dam project has the following major components:

- Roads, bridges and other infrastructure
- Concrete dam with power intake structure
- Power house
- Pick up weir with balancing reservoir and head regulators

== See also ==
- List of dams and reservoirs in Afghanistan
- Tourism in Afghanistan
