= International rankings of Afghanistan =

The following are international rankings of Afghanistan.

== Cities ==
- Kabul

Mercer Human Resource Consulting: Most expensive cities 2008, not ranked among top 143 cities
Population of urban area ranked 105

== Demographics ==
- Population ranked 43 out of 228 countries and territories
- CIA World Factbook 2008 estimates Life expectancy ranked 208 out of 211 countries and territories
- Total immigrant population ranked 137 out of 192 countries

== Economy ==
- IMD International: World Competitiveness Yearbook 2005, not ranked among top 60 economies
- The Heritage Foundation/The Wall Street Journal: Index of Economic Freedom 2008, ranked x out of 157 countries
- The Economist: Quality-of-Life Index 2005, not ranked among top 111 countries
- World Economic Forum: Global Competitiveness Report 2008–2009, ranked x out of 125 countries

== Environment ==
- Yale University Center for Environmental Law and Policy and Columbia University Center for International Earth Science Information Network: Environmental Sustainability Index, ranked x out of 146 countries

== Geography ==
- Total area ranked x out of 233 countries

== Globalization ==
- KOF: Index of Globalization 2007, not ranked out of 122 countries
- A.T. Kearney/Foreign Policy Magazine: Globalization Index 2006, not ranked out of 62 countries

== Military ==
- Center for Strategic and International Studies: active troops ranked 27 out of 166 countries

== Political ==
- Transparency International: Corruption Perceptions Index 2008, ranked x out of 180 countries
- Reporters without borders: Worldwide press freedom index 2008, ranked x out of 173 countries
- The Economist Democracy Index 2007, ranked x out of 167 countries

== Society ==
- United Nations: Human Development Index 2007, ranked 174 out of 180 countries
- Save the Children: State of the World's Mothers report 2007, ranked x out of 110 countries
- World Health Organization: suicide rate, ranked x out of 100 countries
- University of Leicester Satisfaction with Life Index 2006, not ranked among top 178 countries

== Technology ==
- Brown University Taubman Center for Public Policy 2006: ranked x in online government services
- Number of mobile phones in use ranked x
- Number of broadband Internet users ranked x
- Economist Intelligence Unit: E-readiness 2008, ranked x out of 45 countries
- World Economic Forum Networked Readiness Index 2007–2008, ranked x out of 127 countries
- United Nations: e-Government Readiness Index, 2008, ranked x out of 50 countries

== Tourism ==
- World Tourism Organization: World Tourism rankings 2007, ranked x

== Transportation ==
- Total rapid transit systems ranked x

== See also ==
- Lists of countries
- Lists by country
- List of international rankings
