= Salma Dam =

Dam in Chishti Sharif District, Herat Province, Afghanistan

- Location within Afghanistan
- Official name: Afghan-India Friendship Dam
- Country: Afghanistan
- Location: Chishti Sharif District, Herat Province
- Coordinates: 34°19′51″N 63°49′31″E
- Purpose: Irrigation and electricity
- Status: Completed
- Construction began: 1976
- Opening date: 4 June 2016
- Construction cost: US$ 290 million
- Owner: Government of Afghanistan
- Operator: Ministry of Energy and Water

Dam and spillways
- Type of dam: Embankment
- Impounds: Hari River
- Height: 107.5 m (353 ft)
- Length: 551 m (1,808 ft)

Reservoir
- Active capacity: 560×10^{6} m^{3} (453,999 acre⋅ft)
- Inactive capacity: 633×10^{6} m^{3} (513,181 acre⋅ft)
- Catchment area: 11,700 km^{2} (4,500 sq mi)

Power Station
- Turbines: 3 × 14 MW
- Installed capacity: 42 MW
- Annual generation: 86.6 GWh

The Salma Dam, officially named Afghan-India Friendship Dam, is an embankment dam located on the Hari River in Chishti Sharif District of Herat Province in western Afghanistan. It has a hydroelectric power station that produces 42 MW of electricity in addition to providing irrigation for 750 km^{2} (290 sq mi) of farmland.

The Salma Dam was opened on 4 June 2016 by former Afghan President Ashraf Ghani along with Indian prime minister Narendra Modi.

== History ==
Feasibility reports for the construction of a dam in Chesti-e-Sharif district were prepared in 1957. In 1976, an Afghan firm was tasked with construction of the dam. The firm appointed Water and Power Consultancy Services (India) Ltd (WAPCOS), a company owned by the Indian Ministry of Water Resources, to construct the dam. The Soviet invasion of Afghanistan in 1979 halted work on the project.

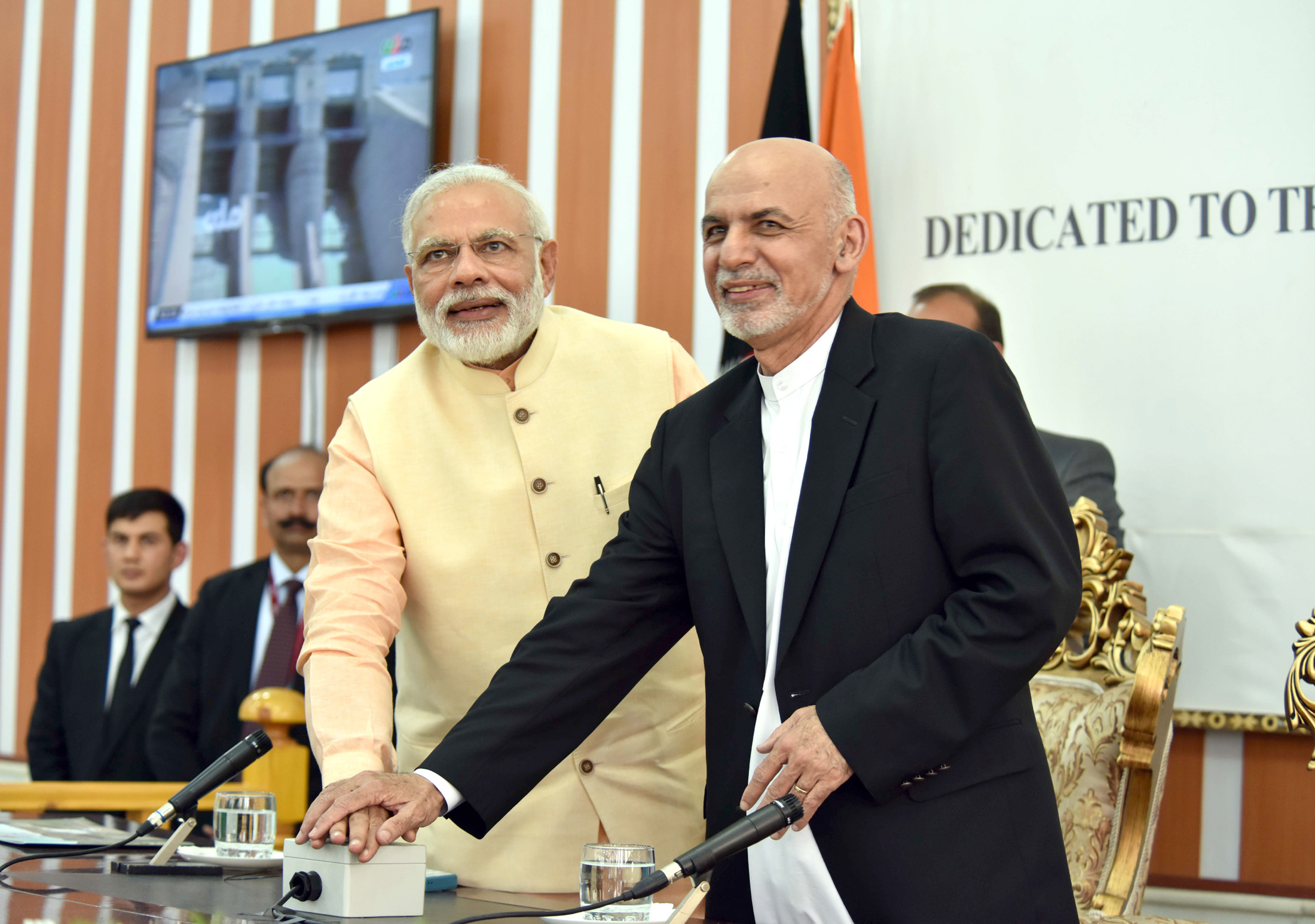
Indian Prime Minister Narendra Modi and Afghan President Ashraf Ghani inaugurating the dam.

WAPCOS attempted to continue construction on the dam in 1988, but the project was left incomplete again due to the ongoing instability. In 2006, India committed to funding the completion of the Salma Dam at an estimated cost of US$ 275 million.

In January 2013, the Indian cabinet approved revised cost of ₹ 1,457 crores (US$ 273.3 million) for the completion of the project and declared it would be completed in December 2014, or two years behind the previous schedule. On 26 July 2015, the dam began to impound its reservoir.

The dam was inaugurated on 4 June 2016 by Indian Prime Minister Narendra Modi along with former Afghan President Mohammad Ashraf Ghani.

Indian public sector power equipment manufacturer BHEL played an instrumental role in the execution of the project by successfully commissioning two 14 MW units for the dam.

== Incidents ==
During the construction of the dam, some Afghans alleged that politicians in Iran were attempting to stop work on the dam project, which would reduce the flow of river water into neighbouring Iran. According to the local Afghan National Police of the area, the Iranian government is funding local Taliban members to oppose construction of the dam. In 2009, a parliamentarian from Kabul Province, Najibullah Kabuli accused Iran of interfering in the construction of the Salma Dam.

When the governor of Chishti Sharif District, Abdulqudus Qayam, was killed along with five security officials in mid-January 2010, the Afghan media called it an insurgent attack. The Taliban accepted responsibility, but many in Herat saw it as part of a wider problem the province is having with Iran. Qayam had been instrumental in pushing the construction of the dam.

In March 2013, the then-National Directorate of Security (NDS) claimed that Taliban's Quetta Shura attempted to blow up the Salma Dam with 1,300 kg (2,900 lb) of explosives. According to NDS spokesman Shafiqullah Tahiri, "Mullah Abdul Ghani, a member of the Quetta Shura who plans suicide attacks, was behind the conspiracy". The explosives were discovered in a deserted area of the Pashtun Zarghun District of Herat Province, which were smuggled into the area from Balochistan, Pakistan. One person by the name of Sayed Gul was arrested. Several other unsuccessful attacks have been reported in the following years.

== See also ==
- List of dams and reservoirs in Afghanistan
