= Sultan Dam =

Dam in Jaghatu, Ghazni, Afghanistan

Coordinates: 33.7600°N 68.3800°E

Sultan Mahmud Dam
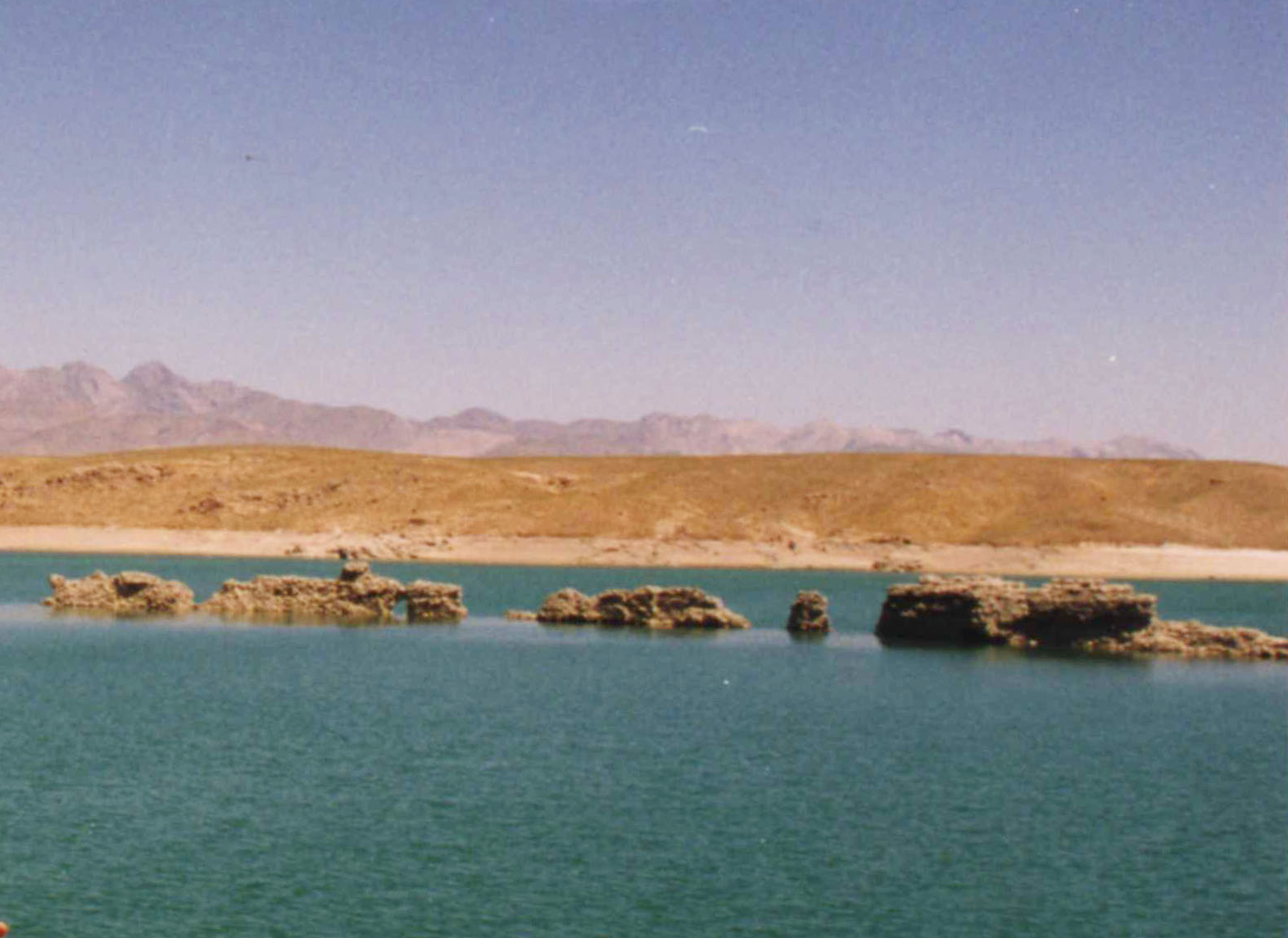
- The reservoir of Sultan Dam

- Location within Afghanistan
- Country: Afghanistan
- Location: Jaghatu District, Maidan Wardak Province
- Purpose: Irrigation
- Status: Operational
- Construction began: 10th century
- Owner: Ministry of Energy and Water

Dam and spillways
- Type of dam: Embankment
- Impounds: Ghazni River

The Sultan Mahmud Dam, locally called Band-e Sultan (Dari: بند سلطان), is an embankment dam located on the Ghazni River in the Jaghatu District of Maidan Wardak Province in eastern Afghanistan. It has importance for residents of both Maidan Wardak and neighboring Ghazni Province. Its reservoir has the capacity to irrigate around 10,000 ha (25,000 acres) of agricultural land.

The Sultan Dam was built during the Ghaznavids era in the 10th century, in memory of Sultan Mahmud of Ghazni. It has the potential to meet electricity needs of 50,000 families.

The barrage collapsed in March 2005, leading to catastrophic flooding of the city of Ghazni, which is located about 30 km (19 mi) to the south. The Sultan Dam attracts many tourists, particularly locals and residents of nearby provinces.

== See also ==
- List of dams and reservoirs in Afghanistan
- Tourism in Afghanistan
