= Bala Buluk District =

Bala Buluk بالا بلوک
- District
- Location within Afghanistan
- Coordinates: 32°41′56″N 62°43′48″E
- Country: Afghanistan
- Province: Farah
- Occupation: Taliban

Population (2004)
  - Total: 100,429

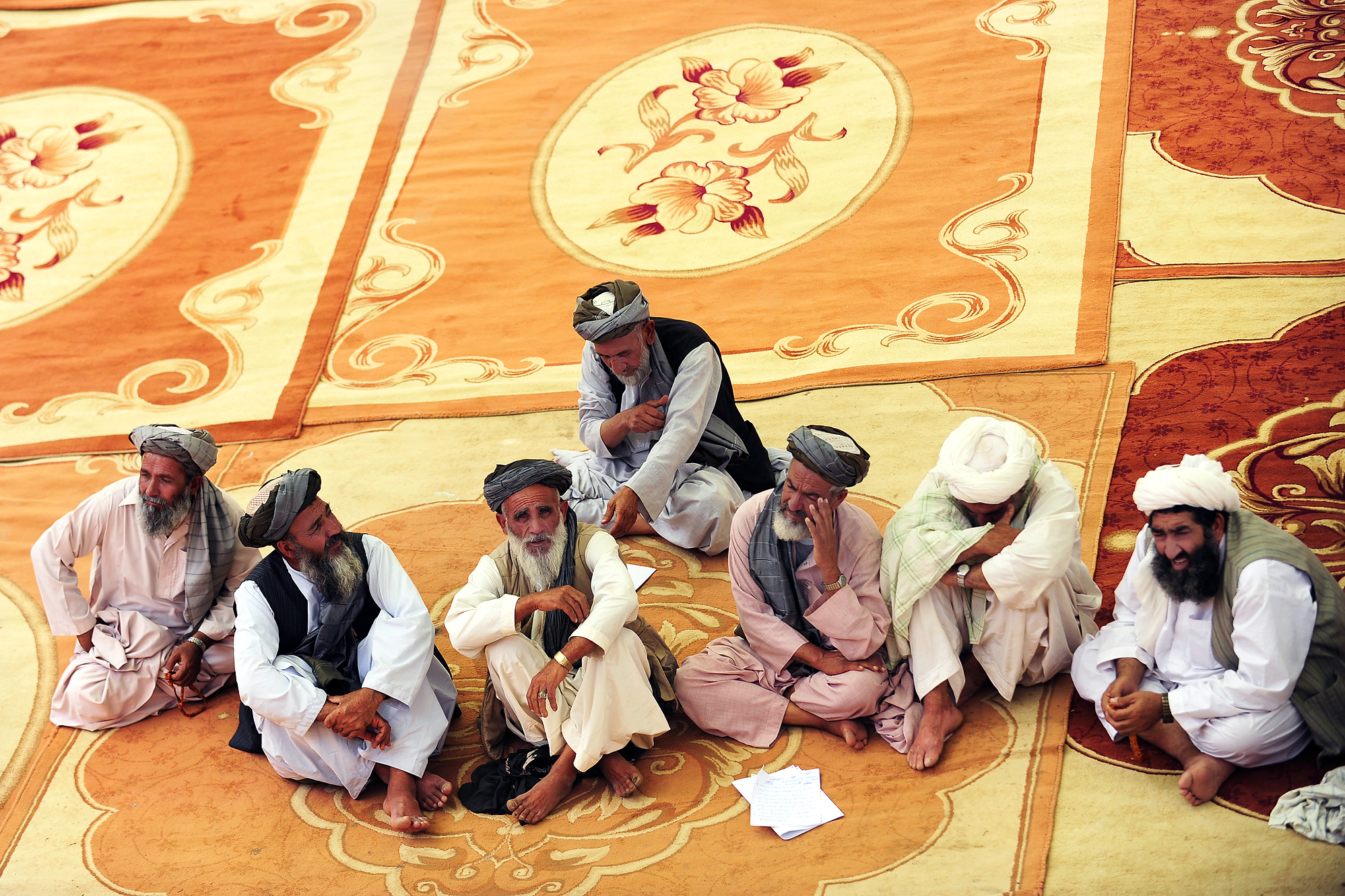
Village elders attend the graduation ceremony for the first Afghan local police unit in the Bala Baluk district of Farah Province, Afghanistan.

Bala Buluk (Pashto: بالا بلوک) is a district in Farah province, Afghanistan. Its population, which is approximately 95% Pashtun and 5% Tajik, was estimated at 100,429 in December 2004.

== 2009 US airstrike ==
In May 2009, an American airstrike in the village of Granai in Bala Buluk District occurred that killed many civilians. American authorities investigated the incident. According to The New York Times, the villagers say that 147 were killed, an independent Afghan human rights group says 117 were killed, but the American authorities are skeptical that even 100 were killed. As with all American airstrikes in Afghanistan at the time, it was intended against the Taliban. However, in this instance villagers say that the Taliban had left by the time the airstrike occurred.

== See also ==
- Granai airstrike
