= Qalat District =

Qalat قلات
- District
- Location within Afghanistan
- Coordinates: 32.2°N 66.9833°E
- Country: Afghanistan
- Province: Zabul
- Center: Qalat

Qalat District (Pashto: د قلات ولسوالۍ) is a district of Zabul Province in southern Afghanistan. Its district seat is Qalat, the capital of the province.

== Demographics ==
It has a population of about 34,300 as of 2013. The district is mostly populated by the Hotak tribe of Ghilji Pashtuns.

== See also ==
- Districts of Afghanistan
