= Shakardara District =

- District
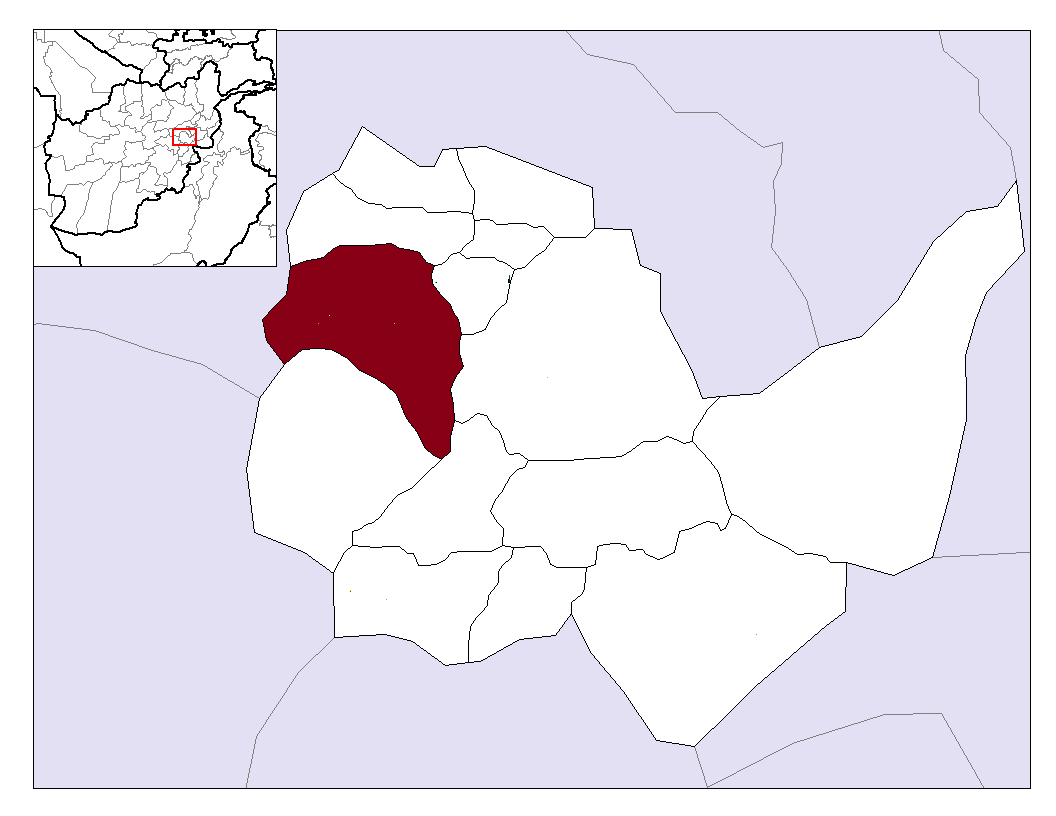
- Location in Kabul Province
- Country: Afghanistan
- Province: Kabul Province
- Capital: Shakar Dara

Population (2025)
  - Total: 101,357
- Time zone: UTC+04:30 (Afghanistan Time)

Shakardara District is one of the districts of Kabul Province in Afghanistan. It is located in the central part of the province and has an estimated population of 101,357 people. Most of them are involved in agriculture, trade, and transport. Some go to work in Kabul or in other Afghan cities.

Shakardara District borders Guldara District in the north, Mir Bacha Kot, Deh Sabz and Kabul districts in the east, Paghman District in the southwest, and Parwan Province in the west. Its administrative center is the village of Shakar Dara, which is located in the central part of the district.

== History ==
In December 2009, the district was declared close to being poppy-free by the Ministry of Counter Narcotics. As a reward the ministry built a 9 km (5.6 mi) asphalted road, which made it easier for local farmers to transport their products to a market in a remote area of the district.

On 17 May 2010 Pamir Airways Flight 112 crashed on a mountainside in the district, killing all 44 people on board.

In 2014 construction on the Shah wa Arus Dam began, which was completed in 2024. It is the biggest dam in the district.
