= Karukh District =

Karukh کرخ
- District
- Location within Afghanistan
- Coordinates: 34°30′41″N 62°37′39″E
- Country: Afghanistan
- Province: Herat
- Center: Karukh

Area
  - Total: 2,010 km^{2} (780 sq mi)

Population
  - Estimate (2025): 79,333
- Time zone: UTC+04:30 (Afghanistan Time)

Karukh District (Dari: ولسوالی کرخ; Pashto: د کرخ ولسوالی) is one of the districts of Herat Province in northwestern Afghanistan, which has an estimated population of 79,333 people. Karukh serves as the administrative center of the district. The Afghanistan Ring Road passes in the district. There are also a number of smaller roads connecting different towns and villages.

One of the main attractions in the district of Karukh is the Pashdan Dam, which provides irrigation water to many farmlands in the area. A number of people visit its reservoir for leisure and pleasure purposes. The reservoir is located about 15 km (9.3 mi) from the city of Herat. A new power substation is also being built in the district.

Karukh District borders Kushk District to the northwest, Kushki Kuhna District to the north and Badghis Province to the northeast. To the east is Obe District. To the south is Pashtun Zarghun District and Injil District is situated to the west.

== See also ==
- Districts of Afghanistan

== Notable people ==
- Rangin Dadfar Spanta
