= Chahar Burjak District =

District of Nimruz Province, Afghanistan

Chahar Burjak Dari: ولسوالی چهاربرجک Pashto: د چاربرجک ولسوالی Balochi: چتاربرجک دمگ
- District
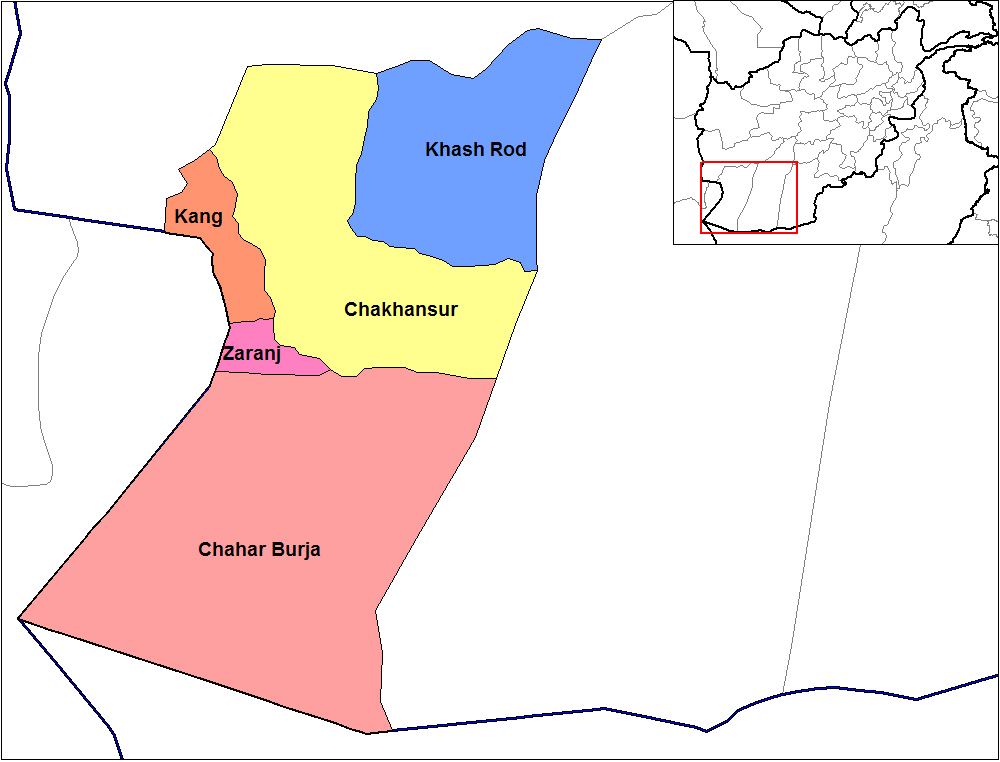
- Chahar Burjak District (shown in pink)
- Interactive map of Chahar Burjak
- Country: Afghanistan
- Province: Nimruz

Area
  - Total: 22,000 km^{2} (8,500 sq mi)

Population
  - Estimate (2025): 32,579
- Time zone: UTC+04:30 (Afghanistan Time)

Chahar Burjak District (Dari: ولسوالی چهاربرجک, Pashto: د چاربرجک ولسوالی, Balochi: چتاربرجک دمگ) is one of six districts of Nimruz Province in southwestern Afghanistan. It has an estimated population of approximately 32,579 people. They have been and reported in 2004 as 88% Baloch people, 10% Brahuis, 1% Pashtuns and 1% Tajiks. Most are involved in agriculture, trade and transport. Some go to work in other cities of Afghanistan.

At just under 22,000 km^{2} (8,500 sq mi) in area, it is the largest district in Afghanistan. The Godzareh Depression, Hamun Lake and Kamal Khan Dam are located in this district.

== Notable people ==
- Abdul Karim Brahui, Governor of Nimroz Province from 2010 to 2012

== See also ==
- Districts of Afghanistan
