= Farah River =

Coordinates: 31.4946°N 61.3800°E

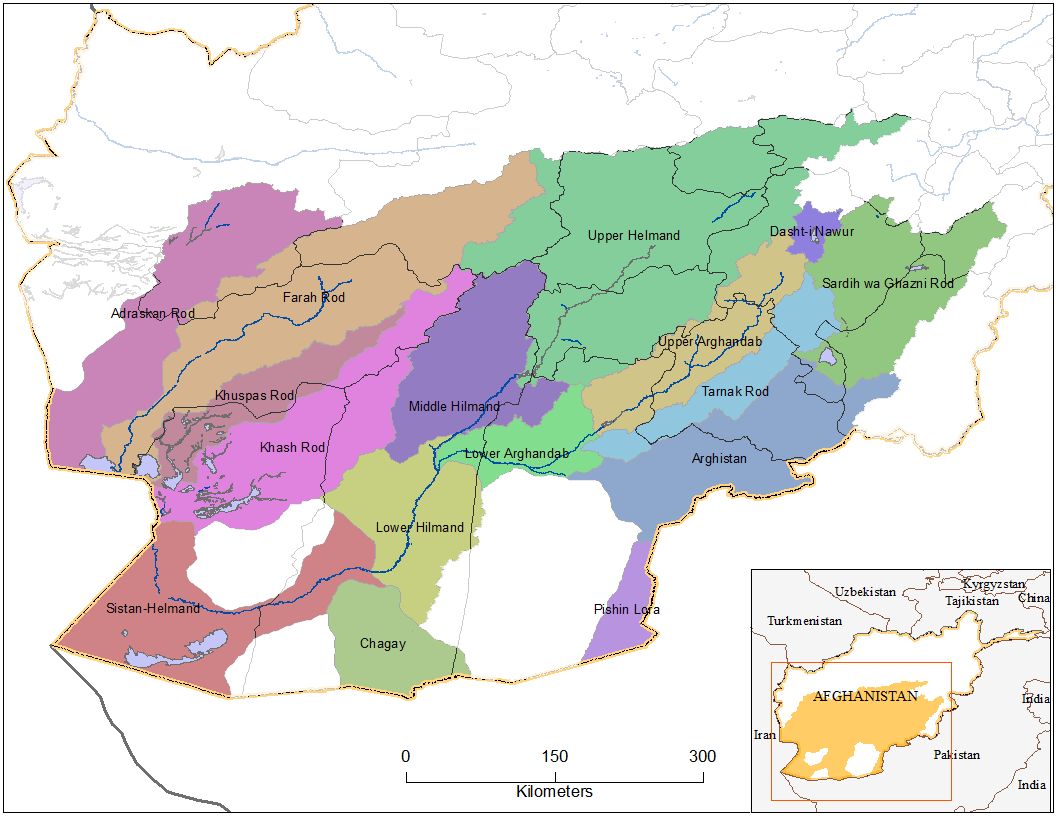
- Native name: فراه رود (Persian)

Location
- Country: Afghanistan

Physical characteristics
- Source
  - location: Band-i-Bayan mountains
- Mouth
  - location: Hamun Lake
- Length: 560 km (350 mi)
- Basin size: Sistan Basin

Basin features
- Tributaries
  - left: Helmand River
  - right: Harut River

The Farah River (Pashto: د فراه سیند; Persian: فراه رود) is a river in western Afghanistan. The river originates in the Band-e Bayan Range in the eastern part of Ghor Province, and flows for 560 kilometres (350 mi) to the Helmand swamps on the Afghanistan-Iran border. The city of Farah is located on the river, where in the dry season, it has a width of around 140 metres (460 ft) and a depth of around 60 cm (24 in). The river fluctuates greatly with the seasons, sometimes flooding in the spring and becoming impassable.

The lower valley of the Farah is fertile and well cultivated.
