= Chishti Sharif District =

Chishti Sharif چشت شریف
- District
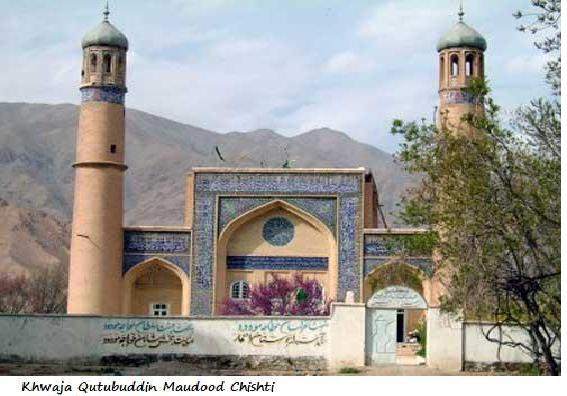
- Mosque of Chishti Sharif

- Location within Afghanistan
- Coordinates: 34°21′12″N 63°44′28″E
- Country: Afghanistan
- Province: Herat Province

Population (2012)
  - Total: 23,100

Chishti Sharif District (Dari: ولسوالی چشت شریف), also known as Chisht District (Dari: ولسوالی چشت), is the most easterly district in Herat Province, Afghanistan, situated along the Hari River and one of its northern tributaries. It borders with Obe District to the west, Badghis Province to the north and Ghor Province to the east and south. The population was estimated at 23,100 in 2012. The district administrative center is the village of Chishti Sharif.

== Infrastructure ==
The district contains 170 km (110 mi) of gravel roads.

== See also ==
- Districts of Afghanistan
