= List of cities in Afghanistan =

Map of major cities as identified by governmental organizations

The only city in Afghanistan with over 1 million settled residents is the nation's capital, Kabul. According to Afghanistan's National Statistics and Information Authority (NSIA), an estimated 36,435,197 citizens are physically residing in Afghanistan as of September 2025. Over 4 million natives of Afghanistan are temporarily residing in Iran and approximately 2 million in Pakistan, and there are at least a million more among the Afghan diaspora around the world. This makes Afghanistan's population over 40 million people. (Note: The last census was conducted in 1979. Sources disagree about the current population: Afghanistan's National Statistics and Information Authority provides that; The Encyclopædia Britannica gives an estimate of 36,432,000 for 2025.; The BBC gives a figure of 38.3 million for 2023.; The CIA gives an estimate of 40,121,552 for 2024.; The UN gives an estimate of 42,045,000 for 2024.; The US Census Bureau provides an estimate of 49,552,566 for 2025.; All figures are mid-year.)

== List ==
The chart below shows 26 cities of Afghanistan with an estimated population of over 100,000 people, by order of population. The estimates are from September 2025, provided by NSIA.

Capitals of provinces are shown in bold face.

No.	City	Province	Population	Citation
1	**Kabul** (nation's capital)	Kabul	5,333,284	
2	**Kandahar**	Kandahar	732,629	
3	**Herat**	Herat	673,273	
4	**Mazar-e-Sharif**	Balkh	568,013	
5	**Kunduz**	Kunduz	413,996	
6	**Jalalabad**	Nangarhar	318,733	
7	**Taloqan**	Takhar	284,990	
8	**Pul-e-Khumri**	Baghlan	230,112	
9	**Charikar**	Parwan	222,751	
10	Baghlan	Baghlan	219,073	
11	**Sheberghan**	Jowzjan	213,411	
12	**Ghazni**	Ghazni	205,965	
13	**Lashkargah**	Helmand	191,458	
14	**Khost**	Khost	170,615	
15	**Mihtarlam**	Laghman	160,123	
16	**Balkh**	Balkh	148,972	
17	**Farah**	Farah	141,091	
18	**Sar-e-Pol**	Sar-e-Pul	134,809	
19	**Pul-i-Alam**	Logar	130,793	
20	**Aybak**	Samangan	130,409	
21	**Firozkoh**	Ghor	129,521	
22	**Tarinkot**	Uruzgan	127,095	
23	Spin Boldak	Kandahar	123,945	
24	**Maimana**	Faryab	108,049	
25	**Gardez**	Paktia	105,278	
26	**Bamyan**	Bamyan	103,909	

== Ancient names ==
Ancient names of places or cities in Afghanistan:

Current city and region	Ancient name
Kabul	Kophene, Gaofū, Kābūrā
Ghazni	Ghaznīn, Ghazna
Balkh	Bakhlo, Bactra, Bokhdī
Bamyan	Bamikan
Herat	Haraiva, Harī, Aria
Laghman	Lampaka
Jalalabad	Adinapur
Kandahar	Arachosia
Lashkargah	Bost, Bust
Zaranj	Zranka, Zarangia, Drangiana
Kunduz	Drapsaka, Walwalij

== See also ==
- Demographics of Afghanistan
- Provinces of Afghanistan
- Districts of Afghanistan
- List of places in Afghanistan
