= Ministry of Energy and Water =

Government ministry of Afghanistan

Afghan Ministry of Energy and Water
- (Dari: وزارت انرژی و آب افغانستان; Pashto: د افغانستان د انرژۍ او اوبو وزارت)
- Ministry flag

- Ministry emblem

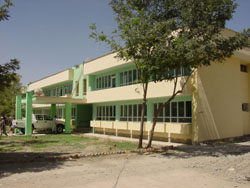
- Ministry of Energy and Water

Agency overview
- Jurisdiction: Government of Afghanistan
- Headquarters: Darul Aman Road Kabul Afghanistan
- Minister responsible: Abdul Latif Mansoor
- Deputy Ministers responsible: Engr. Mujeeb-ur-Rehman Omar; Arifullah Arif
- Website: http://mew.gov.af/en

The Afghan Ministry of Energy and Water (Dari: وزارت انرژی و آب افغانستان, Pashto: د افغانستان د انرژۍ او اوبو وزارت) is a ministry of the government of Afghanistan. Following the U.S. invasion of Afghanistan the ministry had the task of co-ordinating an effort to reintroduce power to areas of Afghanistan that had been cut off. Areas particularly badly affected were southern regions. Pakistan, Iran, and India all agreed to supply power. On 17 June 2003 the Asian Development Bank agreed to give a loan of $50 million (USD) to the Afghan Ministry of Energy and Water. The loan would be spent over the next three years on projects for the production, distribution and transmission of electricity in Afghanistan.

== Ministers ==
=== Minister of Energy and Water ===
Previous Ismail Khan served as Minister from 2004 – October 2013, being succeeded by Mohammad Arif Noorzai from 28 October 2013 – November 2014. On 7 September 2021 Abdul Latif Mansoor was appointed acting minister for the Islamic Emirate of Afghanistan.

- Mohammad Ismael Khan (2004-2009), nominated Minister of Water and Energy 20120215
- Ismael Khan Minister of Water and Energy stepped down because Presidential Election 2014 (20120305 - 20131000)
- Mohammad Arif Noorzai (20131028-20140930)
- Mohammad Arif Noorzai acting Minister of Water and Energy (20141001)
- acting Minister of Water and Power Ghulam Faruq Qarizadeh (20141209)
- Eng Ali Ahmad Osmani (20150418 - 20180609)
- acting Minister of Water and Energy MeW Mohammad Gul Khulmi, was appointed as acting minister (20180609-20190524)
- Tahir Sharan acting (20190529)
- Khan Mohammad Takal acting (20200109)
- Abdul Latif Masoor (20211005) acting

=== Deputy Minister of Energy and Water ===
- Kamaluddin Nizami (20070408)
- Shujauddin Ziayee (20111022)
- Eng. Amanullah Ghaleb Amanullah Ghalib (20160524, 20170203)
- Abdul Baseer Azimi Abdul Basir Azimi (20170215, 20170904) Abdul Basir Azemi, deputy head of the administration and finance department (20180128 suspended)
- Mohammad Gul Khulmi, deputy minister of energy and water for energy, was appointed as acting minister (20180609) resigned (20200109)
- Khan Mohammad Takal (20181012) was appointed as acting Minister (20200109)
- Eng Mujeeb-ur-Rehman Omar, Mujibur Rahman Omar Akhundzada, Mujib-ur-Rahman Omarzada (20210921, 20230403)

=== Head of ESRA ===
- Khan Mohammad Takal

=== Head of NWARA ===
- Ahmad Wais Basiri (20210321)

== See also ==
- Water supply in Afghanistan
