= Nagara (ancient city) =

City in Ancient India

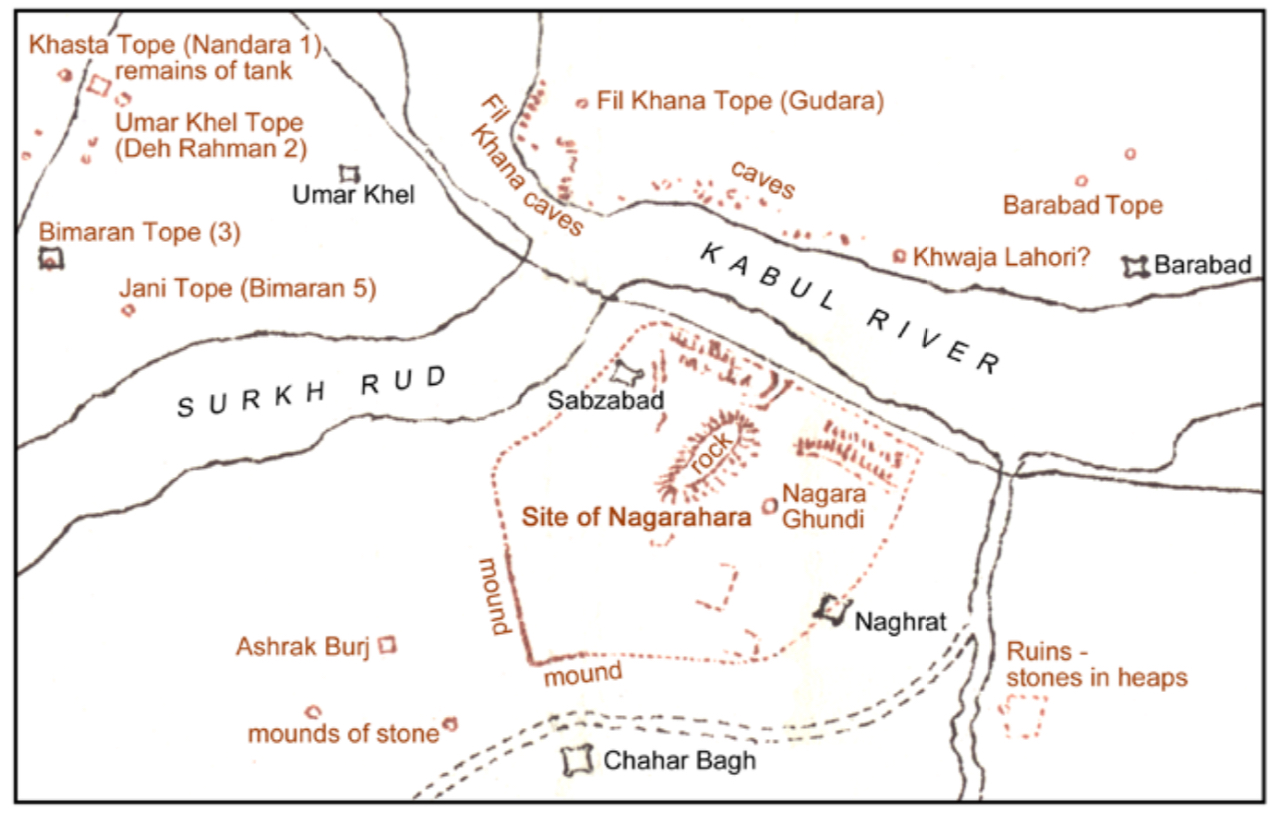
Map marking the extent of ancient Nagarahara according to the work of William Simpson

Nagara (Ancient Greek: Νάγαρα), also known as Dionysopolis (Διονυσόπολις), was an ancient city in the northwest part of India intra Gangem (Note: In Greco-Roman geography, the Ganges river divided the known area of the Indian subcontinent and Southeast Asia into India intra Gangem and India extra Gangem, each roughly corresponding to the peninsular region of South Asia and mainland Southeast Asia respectively.) ("India within the Ganges"), distinguished in Ptolemy by the title ἡ καὶ Διονυσόπολις 'also Dionysopolis'. It also appears in sources as Nagarahara, and was situated between the Kabul River and the Indus, in present-day Afghanistan. The site of Nagara is usually associated with a large stupa called Nagara Ghundi, about 4 kilometres (2.5 mi) west of Jalalabad near Tepe Khwaja Lahori, south of the junction of the Surkhäb and Kabul rivers, where ancient ruins have been found.

== Dionysopolis and Nysa ==
From the second name which Ptolemy has preserved, Dionysopolis, we are led to believe that this is the same place as Nysa (Νύσα) or Nyssa (Νύσσα), which, according to ancient historians, was spared from plunder and destruction by Alexander the Great because the inhabitants asserted that it had been founded by Dionysus, when he conquered the area and he named the city Nysa and the land Nysaea (Νυσαία) after his nurse and also he named the mountain near the city, Meron (Μηρὸν) (i.e. thigh), because he grew in the thigh of Zeus.

When Alexander arrived at the city, together with his Companion cavalry went to the mountain and they made ivy garlands and crowned themselves with them, as they were, singing hymns in honor of Dionysus. Alexander also offered sacrifices to Dionysus, and feasted in company with his companions. On the other hand, according to Philostratus although Alexander wanted to go up the mountain he decided not to do it because he was afraid that when his men will see the vines which were on the mountain they would feel home sick or they will recover their taste for wine after they had become accustomed to water only, so he decided to make his vow and sacrifice to Dionysus at the foot of the mountain.

In Arrian's account, the inhabitants of Nysa claimed that their city has been founded by Dionysus, and Alexander The Great accepted the tradition and performed sacrifices to Dionysus.The Identification of Nagarahara(Nagara) with Alexander's Nysa is longstanding but remains a subject of scholarly discussion.

The region also presevered evidence of the interaction with different Indian religious traditions.While Nagarahara was an important Buddhist center, the wider northwestern subcontinent was also home to Bramhanical And Saiva Traditions. Comparisons have sometimes been drawn between the Dionysian characteristics associated with Nysa and the aspects of the Rudra or Pashupati tradition, particularly associations with mountains, wilderness and animals. The broader archaeological background is significant because the Indus Valley Civilization extended into northern Afghanistan, with the site of Shortugai representing one of its most northernmost settlements. Among the most discussed relegious artifacts is the Pashupati seal From Mohenjodaro depicting a centrally seated, possible yogic figure surrounded by animals. Sir John Marshall interpreted it as proto-siva or Pashupati, although it's exact identity remains debated. The Seal had nevertheless compared with Pashupati-Rudra-Shiva traditions, particularly through its animal associations, seated posture suggesting a possible, though a unproven line of continuity. Classical sources also associate this region with Nysa, visited By Alexander The Great, whose inhabitants connected this city with Dionysus.

Some scholars have compared it's dionysian characteristics with Pashupati or Rudra traditions, but no ancient sources identity the deity as Shiva. The Etymology of Nagarahara is likewise disputed. One Scholarly Proposal derives the name from Nagaravihara suggesting phonetic contraction of -vihara to -hara. consequently, the hara element should not be presented as Hara, an epithet of Shiva without further linguistic evidence

== Greco-Bactrian settlement ==
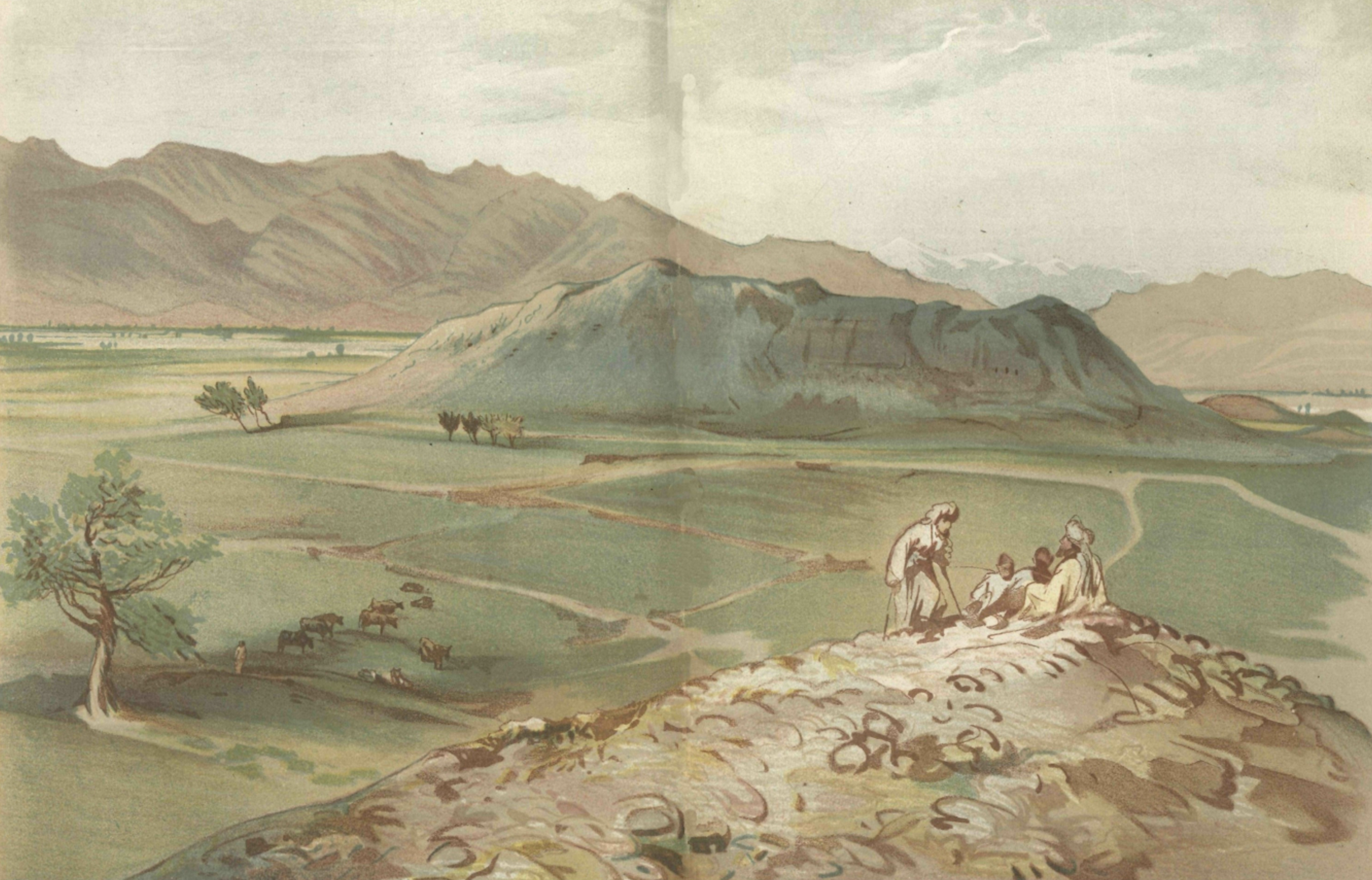
Nagahara, the ancient Capital of the Jellalabad Dionysus

Archaeologist Zemaryalai Tarzi has suggested that, following the fall of the Greco-Bactrian cities of Ai-Khanoum and Takht-i Sangin, Greek populations were established in the plains of Jalalabad, which included Hadda, around the Hellenistic city of Dionysopolis, and that they were responsible for the Greco-Buddhist creations of Tapa Shotor in the 2nd century CE.

== See also ==
- Charles Masson – British East India Company soldier, explorer and amateur archaeologist
- Nagarahara (kingdom)
- Nangarhar Province – Province of Afghanistan
- Xuanzang – Chinese Buddhist monk and scholar (602–664)
