= Tepe Maranjan =

Hill in Kabul, Afghanistan

Maranjan Hill
- تپه مرنجان د مرانجان غونډۍ
- Tapa-e Maranjan
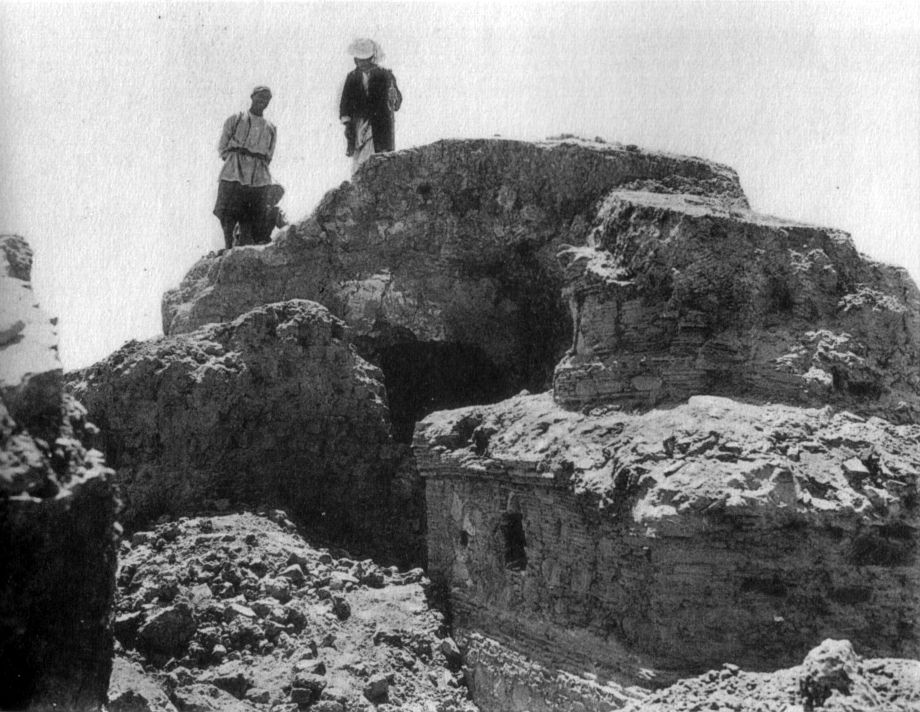
- The Stupa at Maranjan Hill in 1933

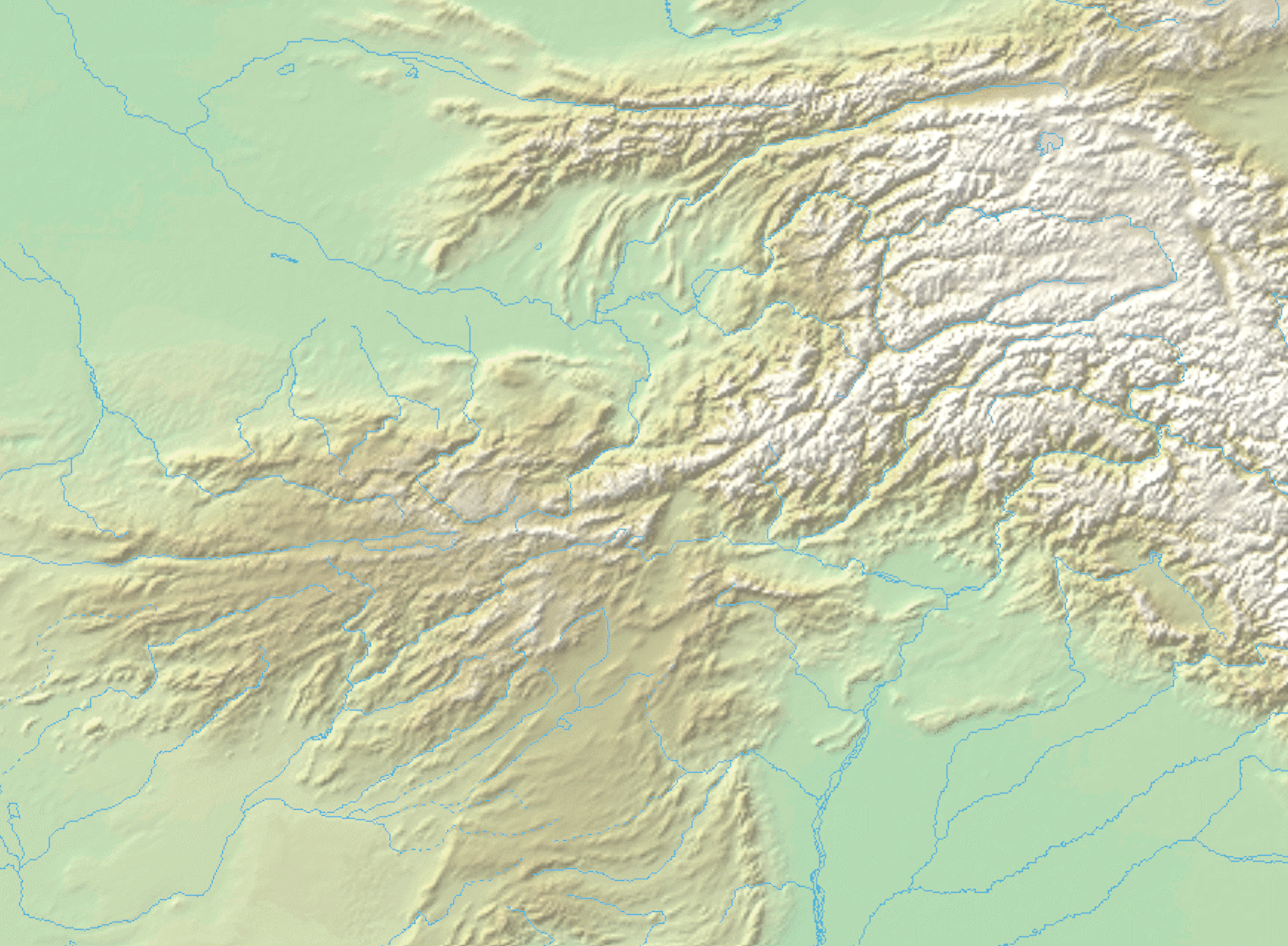
- Location within Afghanistan Location within Hindu-Kush Location within South Asia Location within West and Central Asia
- 34.517801°N 69.208328°E
- Type: Monastery

Maranjan Hill (Pashto: د مرانجان غونډۍ), also known as Nadir Khan Hill, Tapa-e Maranjan (Dari: تپه مرنجان), and Siyah Sang (Dari: سياه سنگ, "Blackstone"), is a historic site on a hill in the Kārte Naw area of Kabul, Afghanistan. It is near Chaman-e-Hozori and the Afghanistan Football Federation Stadium. As the resting place of former Afghan kings Nadir Shah and Zahir Shah, including a number of their family members, Maranjan Hill became one of the city's many tourist attractions. The Sirajuddin Haqqani Mosque was recently built on the northern end of the hill, along with a park.

== Buddhist monastery ==
Tepe Maranjan was the site of a Buddhist monastery that appears to have been founded in the 4th century, the 6–7th century of Buddhism in Afghanistan. It lies east of the tomb of Nadir Shah and north of the Kabul–Jalalabad Road.

The site was excavated by the French Archaeological Delegation in Afghanistan under Jean Carl in 1933, again by Gérard Fussman in 1976, and again by Zemaryalai Tarzi of the Afghan Institute of Archaeology more recently. Many Buddhist sculptures were discovered on the site. They are made of clay and represent a style intermediate between the sculptures of Hadda and those of the Fondukistan monastery. Tepe Maranjan can be considered as generally representative of the art of Gandhara of the 5th or 6th century.

A large hoard of Sasanian coins was also discovered at Tepe Maranjan: 367 Sassanian silver drachms from the reigns of kings Shapur II (r. 309–79) and Ardashir II (r. 379–83), which, owing to their uniformity, are thought to have been minted in the vicinity of Kabul. The hoard also contained 12 scyphate gold dinars of the Kidarites, which might have circulated at the same time as the Sassanian coins, or may have been added later.

== Mausoleums and graves ==
The following is a list of people buried on Maranjan Hill.

- Mohammad Nadir Khan
- Mohammad Zahir Shah
- Sultan Mohammad Khan
- Humaira Begum
- Mohammad Hashim Khan
- Sardar Shah Mahmud Khan
- Shah Wali Khan
- Abdullah Laghmani
- Sulaiman Layeq
- Abdul Ahad Momand
- Shapoor Zadran

== Gallery ==
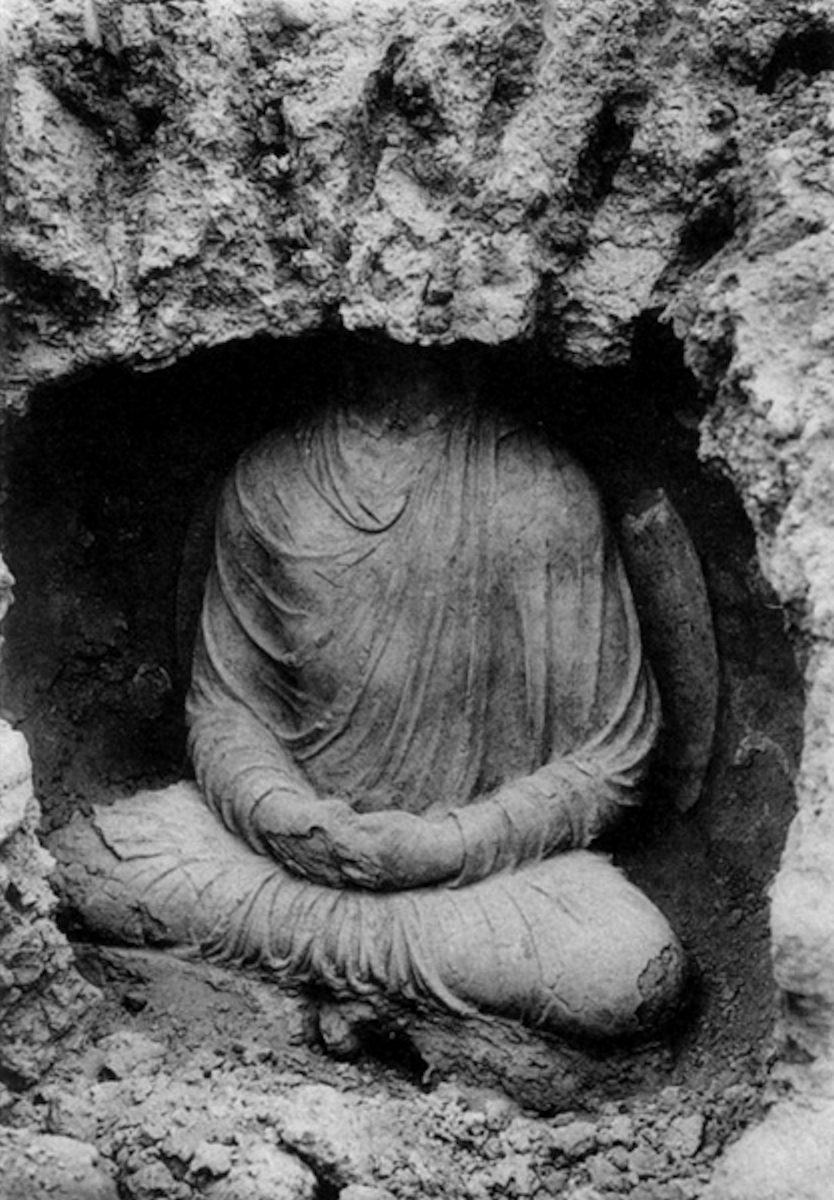
Seated Buddha at Tepe Maranjan

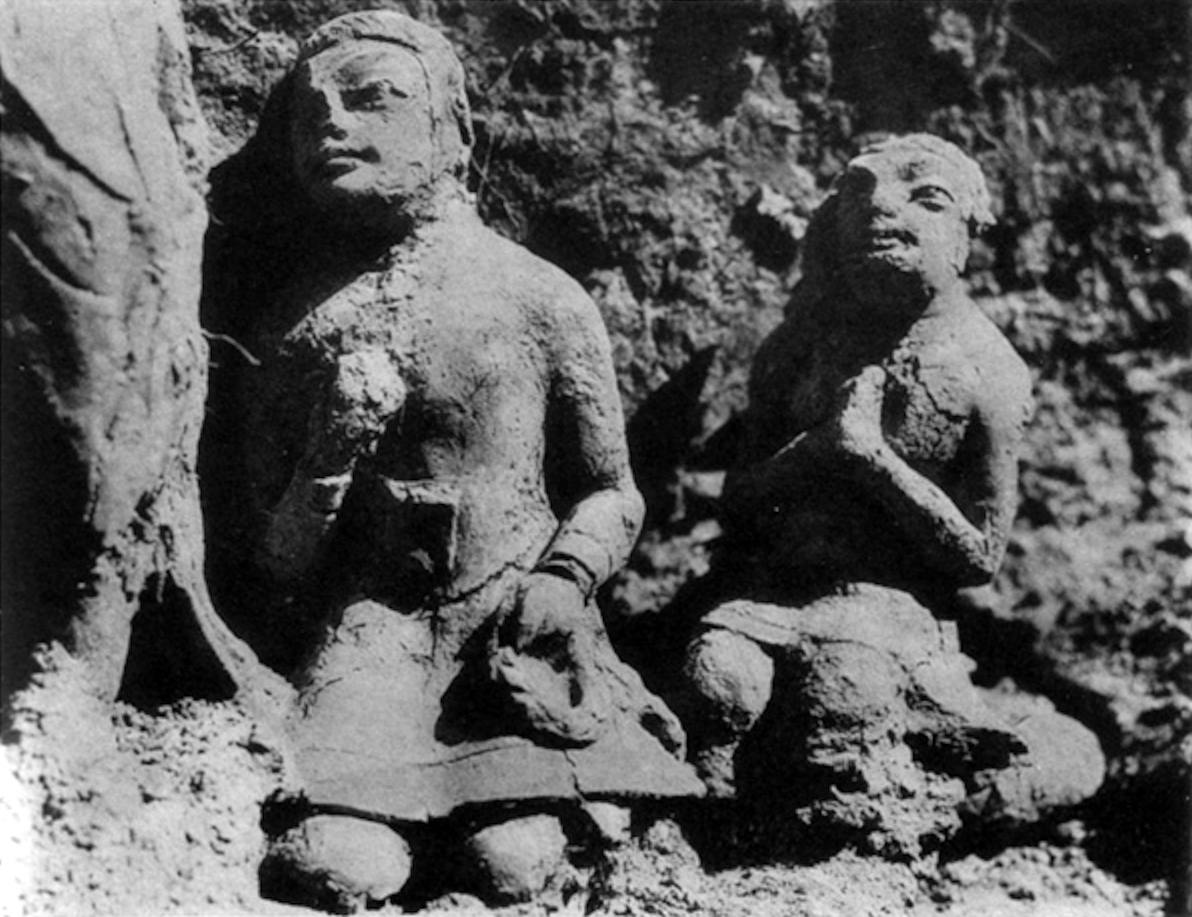
Kneeling Buddhist donors at Tepe Maranjan

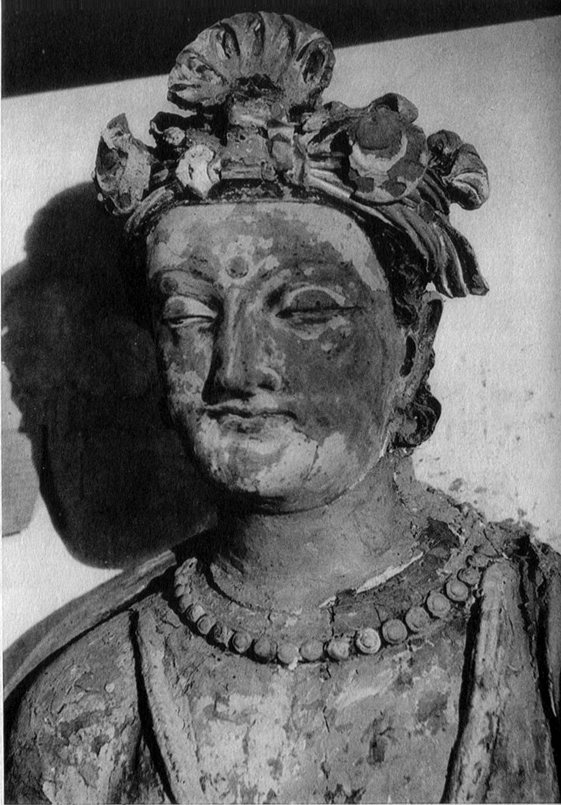
Tepe Maranjan Bodhisattva head

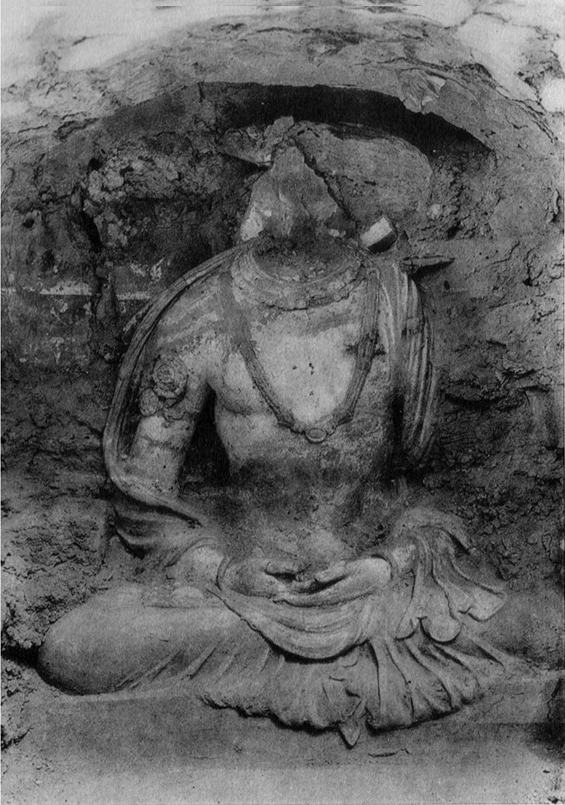
Tepe Maranjan seated Bodhisattva
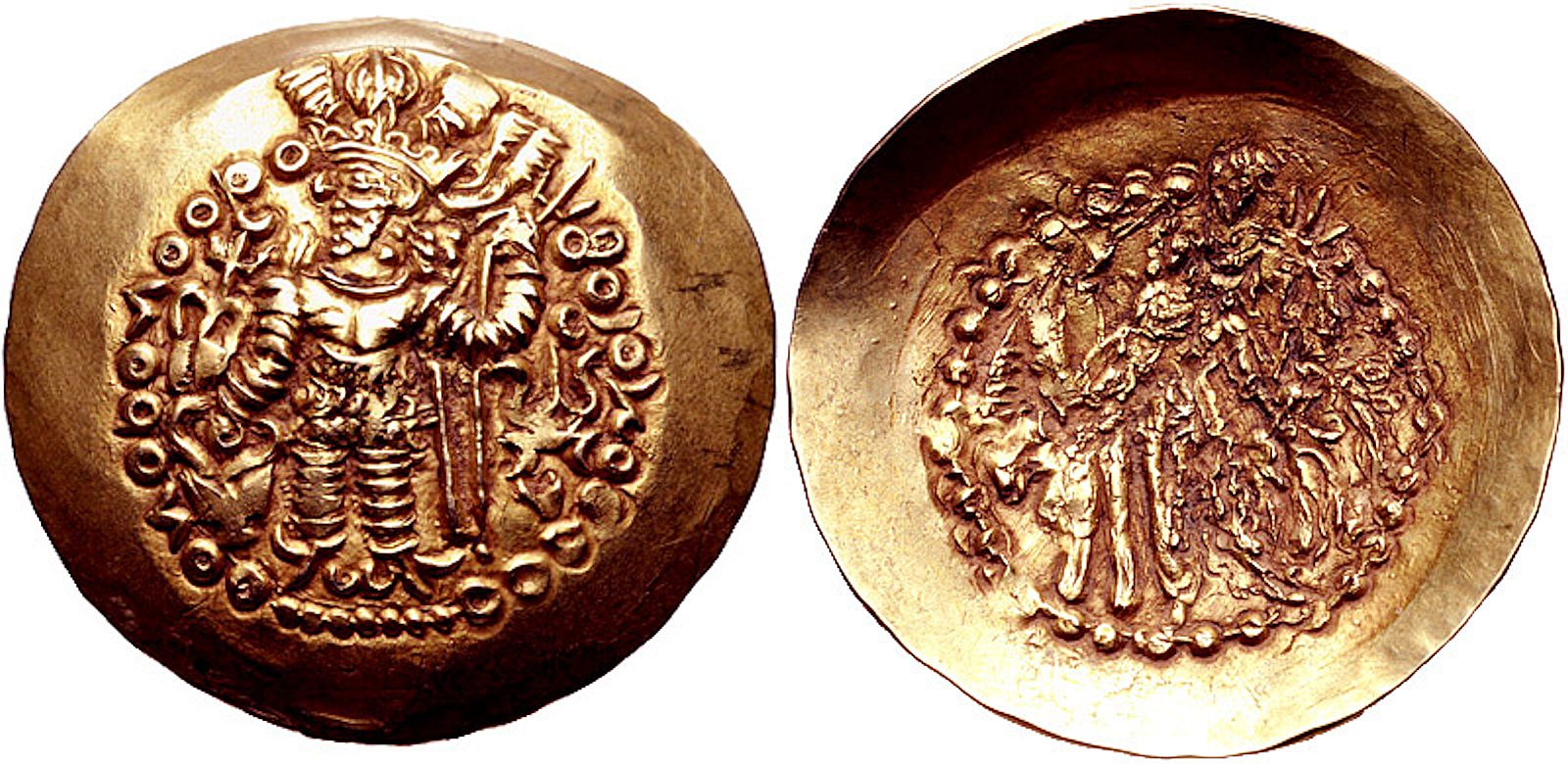
Coin in the name of Kidara I, with legend "βαγο Κιδαρο οοζορκο κοþανοþαο" "Kidara, the great Kushanshah", of the type found in Tepe Maranjan (Type 6A-D), dated to before 388 CE.

== See also ==
- Tourism in Afghanistan
- Wazir Akbar Khan Hill
- Destruction of art in Afghanistan
- Kabul hoard
