= Shamsa Pur =

Village in Nangarhar Province, Afghanistan

Shamsa Pur (Pashto: شمسہ پور) is a village in Surkh-Rod District, Nangarhar Province, Afghanistan, located about 5 km downstream from Zargaran. On the south it is bordered by the Qara Khushkak wash and the Surkh Rod River to the north.

The community owns land adjacent to the PRT bridge across the wash. Prior to the bridge's construction, the communities on the left bank had to wade across the Surkh Rod to the north and were often cut off during the flooding period of the wash and the Surkh Rod River.

== Water ==
Irrigation in the village is from the Surkh Rod and is delivered on-farm through the Shamsha Pur secondary canal which has its bifurcation at Qara Bagh. The community's shallow well, dug by an NGO, is almost dry and the pumping mechanism in disrepair; instead the community uses water from the Surkh Rod. The kuchi women use the water from the wash for their laundry. Ritual ablutions are performed by the men in the canal. There is no karez.

=== Canal system and maintenance ===
The tertiary canal which serves this community is 6–7 km long. Cleaning is carried out by the land owners’ sharecroppers on an as-needs basis, as the canal does not suffer from heavy silting. Those who do not own land or work on the irrigated land do not participate in any of the cleaning activities. Cleaning is usually done from the head of the canal to the tail, but the system is flexible. The labourers work as a gang and divide the cleaning allocation between them. Work is allocated proportionally to the amount of land and water rights of each landlord or sharecropper at the rate of one person per day for those with less than 20 jerib (4 ha) of land, and two people per day for those with over 20 jerib. Only one or two individuals own more than 50 jerib. A landlord with 30 jerib of land, or his sharecroppers, is Social Water Management 17 expected to clean more meterage of the canal than a land owner with 10 jerib, since under the traditional hashar system the former landlord is required to provide more labourers than those with less land. Under normal circumstances it will take the community 6–7 days to clean the canal from head to tail. In the last two years’ cleaning cycle, the hashar system has been modified because of external interventions implemented by an international organisation (a Food-for-Work programme in the first year and a Cash-for-Work programme in the second). In the former, labourers (not just sharecroppers or land owners) were paid at the rate of 7 kg of wheat per working day, in the latter, payment was at the rate of US$2.50 per day.

== See also ==
- Nangarhar Province
