= Bela Baramad Khel =

Coordinates: 34°10′N 71°33′E

Bela Baramad Khel is located on the Kabul River in Peshawar District, Pakistan. It is largely inhabited by Pashtuns. Around the 17th or 18th century residents of this area, they came from the Afghan province of Nangarhar. Bela Baramad Khel falls under the jurisdiction of the patwar halqa of Mamoon, the village has three primary schools.
