= Destruction of art in Afghanistan =

Afghanistan is uniquely situated as a throughway of cultures throughout its history due to its geographic placement in South Asia. Afghanistan's location lends porous borders to trade routes between the East and West, while the Silk Road providing a vector for Buddhism and Hellenistic culture and even Egyptian influences from the west, renders an amalgamation of culture and art. Perpetual invasion and conflict along with Islamic iconoclasm has rendered a cyclic continuum of renaissance and destruction of art and culture in Afghanistan especially related to non-Islamic cultures.

== Historicity of Afghanistan's art ==
How wonderful that people show interest in our past, it means there is hope for the future.

— an Afghan refugee in Peshwar, 1994

Much of Afghanistan's art can be traced back through the invasions, occupations and dynasties that so frequently have ravaged the country. Afghanistan has been a crossroads of cultures that make up the colorfully robust and dynamic foundation of Afghan art. These civilizations include, but are not limited to the empires and kingdoms that comprise Afghanistan's political origins as a modern state. The more renowned, larger regional empires include the Achaemenid Empire, the Macedonian Empire, the Indian Maurya Empire, the Islamic Empire and the Sassanid Empire. Like the empires, Afghanistan's transient and nomadic kingdoms and dynasties that rose to power (see Greco-Bactrians, Kushans, Hephthalites, Turk Shahis, Saffarids, Samanids, Ghaznavids, Ghurids, Kartids, Timurids, Mughals, Hotaki dynasty and Durrani dynasty), helped shape the development of Afghan art as well as its preservation and destruction.

== Soviet invasion/occupation ==
The Soviet Union invaded Afghanistan in 1979 and exacted a staunch interpretation of art that stifled creativity in the 1980s during the Soviet backed regime in Afghanistan from 1979-1989. Throughout this time thousands of pieces of art were pillaged, looted or mysteriously disappeared during the ten year occupation. During the Soviet era, from 1979 through 1992, and the initial rise of the Taliban, only one archeological excavation was carried out in Kabul at Tepe Maranjan.

=== Destruction of ancient archeological sites ===
==== Hadda and the Stupa-monastery complex of Tepe Shortor ====
In the first years of the Soviet occupation several ancient sites, previously explored by French and Afghan archeologists, were ransacked by the pro-Russian government and destitute villagers. The ancient sites included in the ransack and pillaging, which ultimately would continue through and even after the Taliban regime, were the stupa-monastery complex of Tepe Shortor, Hadda, Ai Khanoum, Bactres and Tepe Marandjan.

Famous for its intricate Graeco-Buddhist sculptures and reliefs, the archeological site Hadda is in Gandhara an ancient state in what is now north-eastern Afghanistan, 10 kilometers from the present day city of Jalalabad (adjacent the Khyber Pass). This site was excavated in the 1930s and 1970s where approximately 23,000 clay and plaster sculptures were found. These findings exemplified elements of Buddhism and Hellenism in a near perfect traditional Hellenistic style comparable to the sculptures found at the Temple of Apollo in Bassae, Greece. It is said that Hadda sustained significant damage in the Afghan Civil war and was destroyed in its entirety in 1980.

Tepe Shortor is a Buddhist monastery and stupa complex located at Hadda that was excavated between 1974 and 1979 by Afghan, and later French, archeologists. It is positioned midpoint on the main road from Kabul to Kandahar. The site consisted of an entire ancient town, numerous Buddhist stupas and caves decorated with elaborate stucco figures dated to the second century AD. Looters and pillagers have systematically destroyed the site in addition to some illegal, clandestine excavations. Those statues that were too large to remove were smashed, and the small statues were taken to Pakistani bazaars to be sold. Remains above the plateau, where the site is situated, are Buddhist temple sites including Tapa-Kalan, Tapa-i-Kafariha, Bagh-gai, Chakhil-i-Gundi, deh-Ghundi and Gar-Nao.

==== Ai Khanoum ====
The ancient site of Ai Khanoum is thought to be the historical Alexandria on the Oxus, founded in the fourth century BC as a result of the conquests of Alexander the Great. The Graeco-Bactrian site stood on the left bank of the Oxus river at its meeting point with the Kokcha tributary, rendering it a strategically placed military outpost to control the eastern territories of Alexander the Great's ancient Bactria. The topographic prowess of city complex provided a natural acropolis spanning 60 meters higher than the surrounding areas while two rivers form the west and south provided protection. And for the past 20 years, the world-renowned site in northern Afghanistan has been the target of systematic illicit digs.

Some of the most significant contributions toward the understanding of Greek presence in Bactria were provided by the discoveries made at Ai Khanoum, and as some claim, demonstrated how the Greek artists of Ai Khanoum not only had an affinity for the Greek traditions but also perpetuated a classical style. The slow devastation of Ai Khanoum began with treasure profiteers who had metal detectors brought into the country, originally designed to seek out landmines, but were used instead to hunt the ancient soils. Corinthian and Doric capitals unearthed by French archeologists were taken away and recycled as bases for the columns in tcha-khan while hundreds of ivory pieces, jewelry, intaglios, plaster medallions, bronze items, precious coins and statuettes have found their way to Pakistani bazaars and private collections. Historian and numismatist Osmund Bopearachchi describes the gravity of loss: "The objects that I have seen personally in Pakistani bazaars do not represent one-tenth of the artifacts that have been dispersed in international art markets."

To date, some of the looted or otherwise removed pieces from Ai Khanoum have been found and restored. However, the architectural infrastructure of the lower city is destroyed in its entirety. Craters now occupy the space where Ai Khanoum's lower city once existed.

==== Mir Zakah Treasure ====
A rare find in Mir Zakah, located in Pakhtia province on the Pakistan border, is loosely related to the numismatic knowledge of the Greco-Bactrian era, for which Ai Khanoum provided significant insight. Between 1992 and 1995 one of the largest deposit of coins known in the history of currencies was discovered at the bottom of a well. The circumstances surrounding the treasure's discovery remain unknown to this day. The coin deposit is calculated to contain more than four tons of minted metal, near 550,000 coins of mostly silver and bronze and 350 kilograms of gold. The numismatic travesty of this profound discovery is, according to reliable sources, two and a half tons of the coins had been taken to Switzerland for sale.

=== The National Kabul Museum ===
Beginning during the Soviet occupation that carried through the Taliban insurgence, it is said the Kabul Museum was arguably one of the greatest casualties Afghanistan suffered. As a result of the Soviet and Taliban occupation, more than two thirds of the museums treasures and artifacts were lost or destroyed. During this period of political complication, the museum agonized greatly from its location in the suburbs of Kabul as it was on the frontline of much of the Soviet combat. Until 1992, more than one hundred thousand objects belonging to periods from prehistory to twentieth century were conserved and partially displayed in the museum. From 1992 onward, more than 70 percent of objects in the National Museums collection and 100 percent of the objects deposited in the Archeological Institute, located nearby, were plundered and exported to bordering countries for sale. Meanwhile, clandestine excavations took place throughout the country where the artifacts were illicitly trafficked into international black markets.

In February 2001, a motorcade of vehicles stopped in front of the museum where the minister of finance, the minister of culture and his adjunct, and the infamous Mollah Khari Faiz ur-Rahamn who slapped the Bodhisattva in the summer of 2001, ordered that the storeroom of the museum be opened. According to a staff member who witnessed the scene, "As they entered the storeroom, they snarled in excitement and started to smash everything while chanting 'Allahu Akbar'"

In May 1993, The National Museum was destroyed by several rockets that penetrated the roof, top floor and most of the building doors and windows. Shortly thereafter it was looted where more than four thousand objects deposited in the storerooms of the museum for safe keeping were stolen. Nearby, the Institute of Archaeology was also severely damaged. Philippe Flandrin describes the looting process in which the storerooms of the museum were systematically emptied:

Three quarters of the collections that have been found were removed without any iconoclastic intent. The pillaging of the museum follows the same surgical rules as the looting of castles. It is carried out with method and order, under the guidance of professional thieves who take care to salvage, along with the valuable, the corresponding catalogs and inventories that identify the stolen items.

== Taliban insurgence/occupation ==
Upon the emergence of Taliban rule from 1996-2001 the ban on most forms of art and cultural expression was immediately implemented. The Taliban's war on art was inspired by the Koran. The Koran forbids the portrayal of living things, whereby drawing or sculpting living things is recognized as a direct affront to the Almighty. Among the initial acts of removal were dragging paintings out of homes, book burnings containing art work, public execution to TV sets and the discontinuation of music. In 1996, at the very beginning of the Taliban's rise to power, the entire card catalog archiving the art at the Afghan National Museum was burned in order to keep the rebels warm. The systematic destruction of museums and their collections, to include film archives were purged to cleanse them of the "unIslamic" depiction of the living and human form. In addition to the bans on tangible and visual art mediums, social and cultural expressions such as kite flying and owning pet birds were similarly forbidden. For women, an edict was issued banning make-up and high heels in the Afghan capital where the Department of Promotion of Virtue and the Prevention of Vice was installed to ensure strict compliance. The Ministry administrators regularly beat women who disobeyed these dress-code laws. Even a decade after the end of the Taliban's official regime ended, beauty parlors in Afghanistan's capital, Kabul, do their best to hide go unnoticed by Taliban sympathizers.

=== Destruction of texts and artifacts ===
Through 1992, attacks and looting of the National Museum of Afghanistan resulted in a loss of 70% of the 100,000 artifacts of Afghan culture and history.

On 11 August 1998, the Taliban destroyed the Puli Khumri Public Library. The library contained over 55,000 books and old manuscripts and was considered by Afghans as one of the most valuable and beautiful collections of their nation and their culture.

In October 2001, Taliban was reported to have destroyed at least 2,750 ancient works of art at the National Museum of Afghanistan during the year.

=== The Giant Buddhas of Bamiyan ===
The obliteration of the giant Buddhas of Bamiyan also known as the "Bamiyan Massacre" is arguably the most devastating act by the Taliban against the history of Afghanistan. In March 2001, supreme Taliban leader Mullah Mohammed Omar issued an edict against un-Islamic graven images, including but not limited to, all idolatrous images of humans and animals. The well-coordinated and media sensationalized dynamiting of the giant Buddhas was the Taliban's outwardly dramatic expression of their quest to exterminate all "idolatrous" and unIslamic images from Afghanistan's pre-Islamic past. The destruction ancient art, like the peaceful giants, was seen by Taliban radicals as the fulfillment of Koranic law.

Dated to the seventh century BC, the Colossi were cut at what is conceived to be an immeasurable cost into the towering, sandstone cliffs surrounding Bamiyan. Located at the center of a long valley, separating the mountain ranges of Hindu Kush and Koh-i-Baba, the taller of the two statues (approximately 53 meters/175 feet) is thought to represent Vairocana while the shorter one (approximately 36 meters/120 feet) most likely represents Buddha Sakyamuni, although the local Hazara people believe it embodies a woman. In the height of their existence, the two colossi rendered an awesome sight situated in a cliff with innumerable caves on either side of them while visible for miles with giant copper plated accents and brightly painted garments, as the statues were naturally illuminated both day and night. The Buddhas were seen as transcendental images and key symbols in the rise of Mahayana Buddhist teachings, the antithesis of Taliban belief construct and rule of law.

In 1998, a Taliban commander fired grenades at the smaller statue, severing its upper half. The Taliban bombed the mountain above the statues frequently, cracking the enclaves that held the statues and damaging the colossi further. By winter 2001, pleas were raining down on the Taliban from around the world to spare the statues.

Mullah Mohammad Omar, leader of the Taliban Islamic militia in Afghanistan, dismissed the international pleas of the art and historical preservation world community with regard to saving the world-renowned Buddhas from imminent destruction. Despite international condemnation, Mullah Omar ordered the ancient Buddhas to be destroyed per the judgment of the clergymen and the ruling of the supreme court of the Islamic Emirate (Taliban).

On February 26, 2001, the Taliban's supreme leader, Mullah Mohammad Omar, declared, "these idols have been gods of the infidels" and ordered them destroyed.

Based on the verdict of the clergymen and the decision of the supreme court of the Islamic Emirate (Taliban) all the statues around Afghanistan must be destroyed.

According to Islam, I don't worry about anything. My job is the implementation of Islamic order. The breaking of statues is an Islamic order and I have given this decision in the light of a fatwa of the ulema (clerics) and the supreme court of Afghanistan. Islamic law is the only law acceptable to me.

Only Allah, the Almighty, deserves to be worshipped, not anyone or anything else.

— Mullah Mohammad Omar

Explosives, tanks, and anti-aircraft weapons blew apart two colossal images of the Buddha in Bamiyan Province, 230 kilometers (150 miles) from the capital of Kabul. Broken pieces of the statues and fragments of the beautiful paintings that decorated the niches were subsequently offered for sale in the Peshawar bazaar. By early March 2001, the colossi were rubble.

==== Response and resurrection for the Bamiyan Buddhas ====
After the demise of the two colossi in 2001, Dr. Zemaryalai Tarzi, an Afghan archeologist that fled to France upon the Soviet invasion, made the decision to return to Afghanistan and search out an elusive piece of Afghanistan's history, the Sleeping Buddha of Bamiyan. The last time the Sleeping Buddha was seen was approximately 630 AD when it was recorded in the journal of Xuanzang, a Chinese pilgrim who traveled to central Afghanistan in the seventh century AD.

Prior to the Soviet invasion in 1979, Professor Tarzi had already spent three decades of study and completed extensive restoration on the standing Buddhas of Bamiyan. Devastated by the Taliban's indiscriminate destruction of the two standing Buddhas, Dr. Tarzi used the ancient texts from the journal of Xuanzang to locate the suspected area of the ancient Buddhist monastery, housing the sleeping Buddha. Professor Tarzi sought to offer up the discovery and resurrection of the mythological sleeping Buddha of Bamiyan to the Taliban as a response to the terror exacted on the other colossi, affectionately known as the sleeping Buddha's "Brothers".

Due to the intricate detail and accuracy of Xuanzang's immaculately preserved 1,400-year-old journal of the Bamiyan Buddhas, Professor Tarzi mapped out the locations for test sites in search for Xuanzang's descriptions of a giant reclining Buddha nearby. (3)(4) After three years of test sites, in the summer of 2008, Professor Tarzi discovered the remains of the 19-meter-long reclining Buddha statue within the foundations of an ancient Buddhist temple less than two kilometers from the niches where Bamiyan's two giant Buddha statues once stood.

Although saved from the ravages of war and conflict, the sleeping colossus did not escape significant injury. Due to the fact that very little is known about the sleeping Buddha, it is difficult for archeologists to ascertain the exact causes of the damages. However, Professor Tarzi assessed the majority of the impairment as simple deterioration from time and the elements.

Most of the parts are damaged. But we discovered a piece from the upper right arm down to the elbow. We discovered its neck and its shoulders. But the head is broken because of water damage beneath the ground. Still, the pillow he is sleeping on is in perfect condition. Tarzi

== Future of Afghanistan's art, cultural heritage and identity ==
Little is certain on the survival and preservation of Afghanistan's cultural heritage through the mediums of art and architecture. However, much is being done to reinstitute art studios, traditional clay sculpting schools and archeological foundations in order to reopen the doors and expand upon Afghanistan's lost, forgotten or otherwise suppressed traditional teachings and cultural heritage. In 2002, UNESCO was charged with the task of rehabilitating Afghanistan's scarred cultural heritage that underwent incredible loss and irreversible damage during two continuous decades of war and civil unrest. Despite ongoing operations to thwart Taliban resurgence attempts, UNESCO is entrusted by the existing Afghan government to coordinate all international efforts to aiming to safeguard and enhance Afghanistan's cultural heritage. UNESCO's strategy includes assisting in the re-establishment of links between the populations in order to develop a sense of common ownership of monuments, artifacts and historical sites that represent the cultural heritage of different segments of Afghan society. To date, the expenditures of UNESCO's funding and alternative forms of assistance well exceed the 7 million committed at the Kabul Seminar in May 2002.

It may be argued that in the face of millions of displaced Afghans, large scale impoverishment, homelessness, unemployment and injustice, not to mention the almost total destruction of basic national infrastructure and the continued instability, factionalism and international division, cultural heritage is the least of Afghanistan's priorities. Why bother about the ancient Buddha statues when ordinary Afghans are starving here and now? But a nation's cultural identity cannot be so easily dismissed: the past, the monuments, the history, the art treasures are as essential in establishing national unity and self-confidence as basic infrastructure is…This not only applies to new nations: the importance of Firdausi and Persepolis to Iran's identity, or Homer and the Parthenon to Greece's or the Great Wall to China's, need hardly emphasizing. The glories and achievements of the Kushan or the Ghaznavid civilizations are far more a part of Afghanistan's identity than the Taliban, the factionalism or the fighting are… If the last decades of Afghanistan's history have demonstrated nothing else, it is the need for a strong, unified cultural identity and cohesiveness. The role of its cultural heritage is essential in this.

Excavators at the Buddhist site of Mes Aynak have been denounced as "promoting Buddhism" and threatened by the Taliban and many of the Afghan excavators who are working for purely financial reasons don't feel any connection to the Buddhist artifacts.

After the Taliban's return to power on 15 August 2021, there is growing concern of the repeated destruction and epistemicide of the national artistic and cultural heritages in Afghanistan, especially since the de facto Taliban government enacts the Law of Propagation of Virtue and Prevention of Vice that banned images of living creatures and banned music in the country.

== See also ==
- Soviet invasion of Afghanistan
- Archaeology of Afghanistan
- National Museum of Afghanistan

== Bibliography ==
- Mojumadar, Aunohita (September 14, 2008). "Beyond the Frame". The Hindu. Archived from the original on September 16, 2008.
- Comiteau, Lauren. "Saving Afghanistan's Art". Time January 8, 2008. Web. October 25, 2011. Archived from the original on January 12, 2008.
- World Archaeological Congress and Agnew, Neville, and Bridgland, Janet. Of the past, for the future: integrating archaeology and conservation: proceedings of the conservation theme at the 5th World Archaeological Congress, Washington, D.C., 22–26 June 2003 / edited by Neville Agnew and Janet Bridgland. Getty Conservation Institute, Los Angeles, Calif.: 2006
- Van Krieken-Pieters, Juliette, ed. Art and Archeology of Afghanistan: its fall and survival: a multi-disciplinary approach. Leiden, The Netherlands: Koninklijke Brill NV, 2006
- Lost Treasures of Afghanistan. Dir. James Barrat. Ed. Geoff Luck. 2006. DVD. National Geographic Television and Films
- Routray, Bibhu Prasad. "Bibhu Prasad Routray: Why ban just the bra in Somalia? Ban Everything. Ban food. Ban life". Al Arabiya. July 29, 2011, retrieved November 1, 2011.<http://www.alarabiya.net/views/2011/07/29/159848.html >
- Afghan Archivist of Culture, Robin Clewley, November 6, 2011 <https://www.wired.com/2001/11/afghan-archivist-of-culture/>
- Flandrin, P. 2001. Le Tresor perdu des rois d'Afghanistan. Paris: Editions du Rocher. (cited translations by Osmund Bopearachchi)
- Bopearachchi, Osmund. "Vandalized Afghanistan". The Hindu March 16–29, 2002. (vol.19, issue 6)
- Synovitz, Ron. "Archaeologists Find Giant 'Sleeping' Buddha In Afghanistan". Radio Free Europe Radio Liberty. September 9, 2008 <https://www.rferl.org/a/Archeologists_Find_Giant_Sleeping_Buddha_In_Afghanistan_/1197572.html>
- Afghan Taliban leader orders destruction of ancient statues - http://www.rawa.org/statues.htm
- The History of Afghanistan - by Jayaram V - http://www.hinduwebsite.com/history/afghan.asp#A
