= Qala-e-Haji Sahib =

Village in Afghanistan

Qala-e-Haji Sahib is a village in Surkh-Rōd District, Nangarhar Province, Afghanistan. It is located in the capital of Surkh-Rod district, Sultanpur. It is bordered by Surkh-Rod river to the north. This village is named after the great-grandfathers who did hajj: Haji Shahbaz, Haji Muhammadbaz and Haji Shireen Stanikzai sahibaan. Most of the people from this village are from the tribe of Stanikzai and the sub tribe of khutubkhail.

Cuisine varyies among them. Haji sahibaan are also known for their large varieties of dried fruit and yogurt based dishes. Yogurt called maste is usually made by themselves in their own homes. Chai (tea) plays a big role in Pashtun gatherings and is served with dried fruits and kulcha (biscuit). Desserts such as firni (custard) are also very popular.

== Agriculture ==
There are cows, sheep, goats, and chickens. The milk and eggs are sold. The plants that are grown are wheat, sugarcane, tomatoes, okra, eggplant, onion, lime, green chili and loquat.
