= Zargaran, Nangarhar =

Village in Nangarhar, Afghanistan

Zargaran (Pashto: زرګران) is a village in Surkh-Rod District, Nangarhar Province, Afghanistan.

== Demographics ==
The Zargaranis are an extended clan of the Muhammadzai clan of Durani Pashtuns. The clan was given the land in Zargaran by one of the Amirs of Afghanistan, but the exact period is not known. Despite Nangarhar being overwhelmingly Pashtun in culture and language, many of the Zargarani Muhammadzais only speak Dari. A number of kuchi maldar (nomadic pastoralists) of the Salozai clan camp around the village during the winter months and migrate up the Kabul River in spring. At least two families of kuchi have settled in the village, bought small parcels of land and built houses. The male members of these kuchi families sharecrop, but also keep a number of animals.

== Water ==
As of May 2006, the Zargaran village has water rights to the Kushkak canal and Sayedan canal canals, which draw from the Surkh Rod River. The mirab of the Kushkak canal has served in the role for the past five years. For domestic water the community has a single well (dug in 2001 by an NGO) which is poorly sited at the highest point in the village. It is almost dry and the hand pumping mechanism broke a year ago and has not been repaired. Water for domestic use is now brought from the wash on the south of the Surkh Rod, which marks the village boundaries to the north.

== See also ==
- Nangarhar Province
