= Fatima Gailani =

Afghan political leader and women's rights activist

- فاطمه گیلانی
- Born: 1954 (age 71–72); Kabul, Afghanistan
- Occupations: Political leader, women's rights activist
- Known for: Presidency of the Afghan Red Crescent Society; women's rights advocacy
- Awards: BBC 100 Women (2021)

Fatima Gailani (Pashto: فاطمه گیلانی; born in Kabul in 1954) is an Afghan political leader and women's rights activist, who previously served as president of the Afghan Red Crescent Society. She was recognized as one of the BBC's 100 women of 2021.

== Early life and education ==
Gailani is the daughter of Ahmed Gailani, the founder of the National Islamic Front of Afghanistan (NIFA) who fought against the Soviets in the Soviet–Afghan War. She graduated secondary school from the Centre d'Enseignement Français en Afghanistan. She then earned a master's degree in Persian literature from the National University of Iran (1978) and a degree in Islamic studies from the Muslim College in London (1994).

== Career ==
While in exile in London during the 1980s, Gailani served as spokesperson for the NIFA in the West.

After the Taliban took control of Afghanistan in 1996, Gailani convinced Muhammad Sayyid Tantawy, the Grand Imam of al-Azhar, to issue a fatwa condemning the Taliban's ban on girls' education. After the Taliban regime fell in 2001, she returned to Afghanistan as a delegate in the 2002 loya jirga and then to participate in drafting a new constitution.

From 2005 to 2016, Gailani served as president of the Afghan Red Crescent Society. In 2017, she served as chair of the Red Cross Conference.

During the Afghan peace process after 2018, she served as a member of the Afghan government's negotiating team. While recovering from cancer, she was one of only four women to have participated in talks with the Taliban in Doha, Qatar in 2020.

After the Fall of Kabul in August 2021, she stated that the negotiating team had been close to a peace deal "and then oops, the President has disappeared. For God's sake."

== Other activities ==
- International Crisis Group (ICG), Board of Trustees (since 2024)

== Recognition ==
Gailani was recognized as one of the BBC's 100 women of 2021.
