= Tapa Shotor =

Buddhist monastery near Hadda, Afghanistan

Tapa Shotor (Hadda)
- Tapa Shotor seated Buddha, with Classical figures of Herakles (left, as Vajrapani) and Tyche (right, as Hariti), in Niche V2, 2nd century CE. Photographed in 1981 by Louis Dupree, before its destructions by the Taliban in 1992.

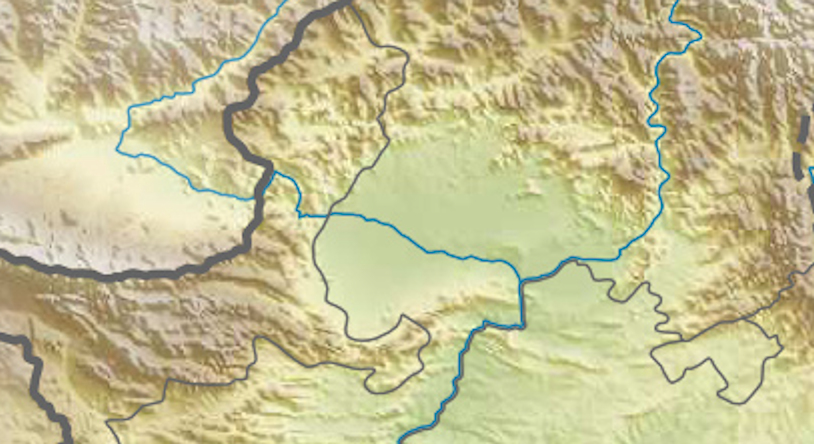
- Location within Afghanistan Location within Gandhara Location within South Asia
- 34.366041°N 70.468981°E
- Type: Buddhist monastery

History
- Built: 1st century BCE
- Abandoned: 9th century CE

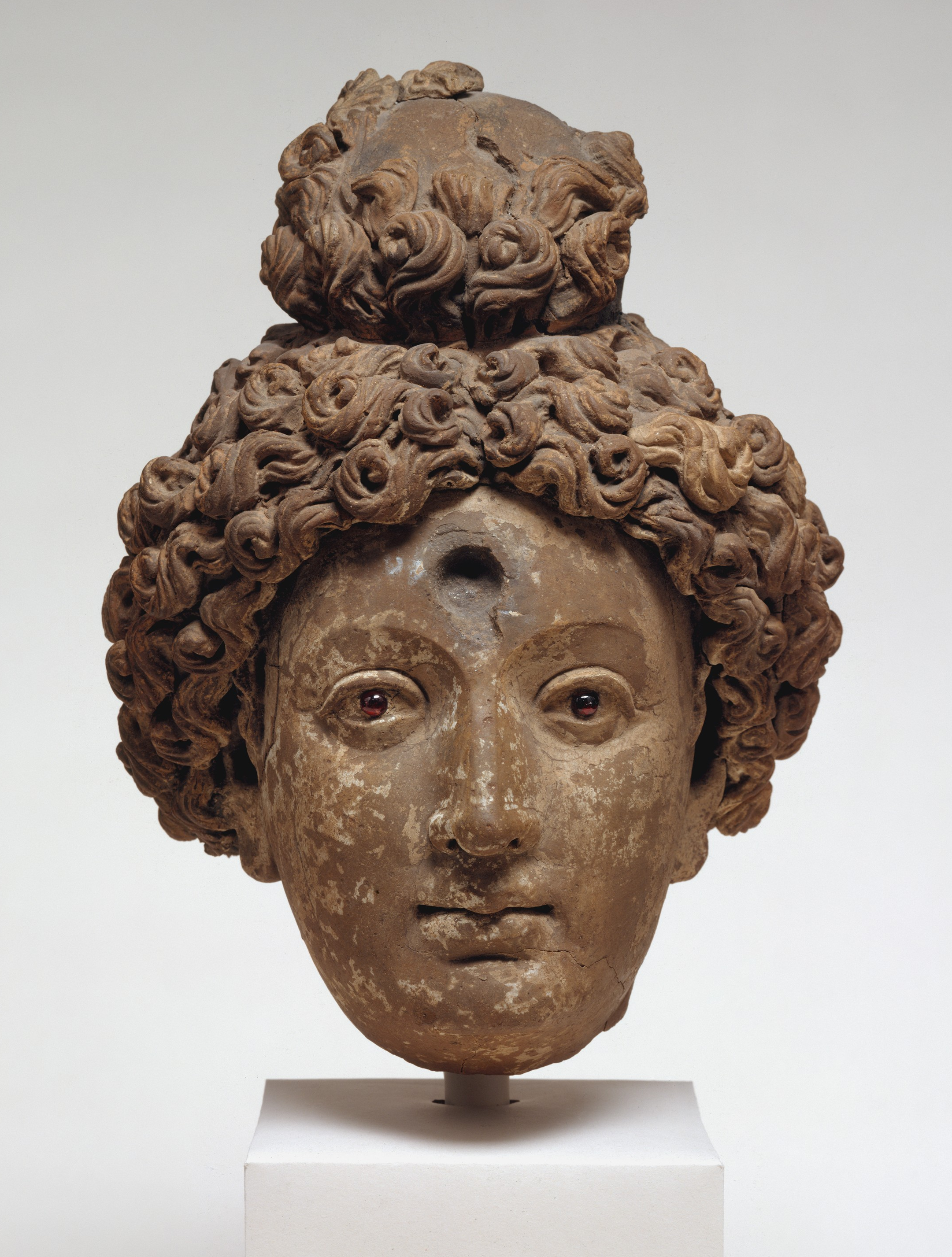
Head of a Buddha or Bodhisattva, facing (4th-5th century), probably Hadda, Tapa Shotor.

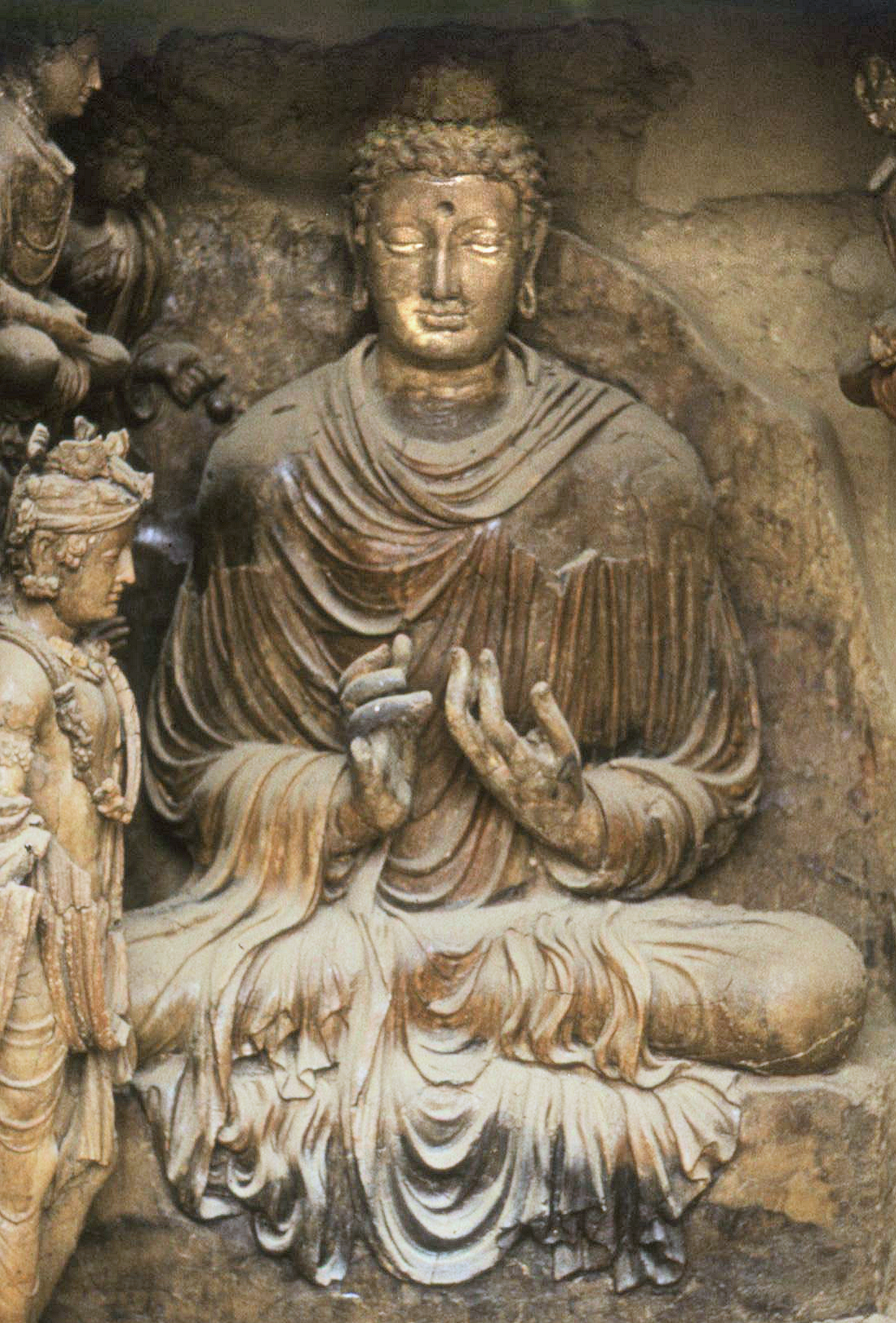
Seated Buddha, Tapa Shotor (Niche V1).

Tapa Shotor, also Tape Shotor or Tapa-e-shotor ("Camel Hill"), was a large Sarvastivadin monastery near Hadda, Afghanistan, and is now an archaeological site. According to archaeologist Raymond Allchin, the site of Tapa Shotor suggests that the Greco-Buddhist art of Gandhara descended directly from the art of Hellenistic Bactria, as seen in Ai-Khanoum.

In 1992, the Taliban looted and then set Tapa Shotor on fire.

== Stylistic analysis ==
In view of the style of the objects found at Tapa Shotor, particularly the clay figures, Allchin suggests that either Bactrian artists came and worked for Buddhist monasteries, or that local artists had become "fully conversant" in Hellenistic art. This opinion was confirmed by the archaeologist who excavated the site Tarzi: "in the light of the latest discoveries there is no longer any doubt about the prolongation of the Graeco-Bactrian artistic past". According to Tarzi, Tapa Shotor, with clay sculptures dated to the 2nd century CE, represents the "missing link" between the Hellenistic art of Bactria, and the later stucco sculptures found at Hadda, usually dated to the 3rd-4th century CE. The sculptures of Tapa Shortor are also contemporary with many of the early Buddhist sculptures found in Gandhara.

Traditionally, the influx of artists conversant in Hellenistic art has been attributed to the migration of the Greek populations from the Greco-Bactrian cities of Ai-Khanoum and Takht-i Sangin. Tarzi further suggested that Greek populations were established in the plains of Jalalabad, which included Hadda, around the Hellenistic city of Dionysopolis, and that they were responsible for the Buddhist creations of Tapa Shotor in the 2nd century CE.

== Chronology ==
According to archaeologist Zemaryalai Tarzi, the first, pre-monastic, period of Tapa Shotor, corresponds to the reign of the Indo-Scythian king Azes II (35-12 BCE). The first Buddhist period dates to the reign of Kushan king Huvishka (155-187 CE). This period correspond to the creation of vihara, and niches 1, 2 and 3 in particular. The period after Vasudeva I to the last Kushans (225-350 CE) saw the creation of niche XIII. After the Kushans, a period of the site corresponds to the Kidarites (4th-5th century CE). The site remained inactive for about 250 years, from around 500 to 750 CE. A last period of activity followed, only marked by restorations, before the destruction of the site by fire in the 9th century CE. The period have been structured as follows:

- Tapa Shotor I: Indo-Scythian king Azes II (35-12 BCE)
- Tapa Shotor II: Kushan king Huvishka (155-187 CE). Vihara, and niches V1, V2 and V3
- Tapa Shotor III: (187-191 CE)
- Tapa Shotor IV: Vasudeva I (191-225 CE)
- Tapa Shotor V: Last Kushans (225-350 CE)
- Tapa Shotor VI: Kidarites (350-450 CE)
- Tapa Shotor VII: 5th century
- Tapa Shotor VIII: 6th century. Corresponds to the 1st period of Tape Tope Kalan.
- hiatus (6th-8th century)
- Tapa Shotor IX: mid 8th century-9th century. Destruction by fire

== Excavation ==
The monastery was excavated by an all-Afghan archaeological team. It yielded numerous sculptures in an archaeologically intact environment, providing great insights on the art of the region. A stupa was excavated in the main courtyard.

A coin of the Indo-Greek king Menander was found in the ruins, but the abundance of finds of Kushan coinage suggest a main 4th century CE date for the site.

Tapa Shortor had some beautiful statuary in Hellenistic style, particularly one seated Buddha attended by Herakles-Vajrapani and a Tyche-like woman holding a cornucopia, now destroyed (Niche V2). Another has an attendant reminding the portrait of Alexander the Great. Boardman suggested that the sculpture in the area might be an "incipient Buddhist sculpture in Indo-Greek style".

Figures of Herakles-Vajrapani with thunderbolt and Tyche-Hariti with cornucopia flanking a Buddha at Tapa Shotor, 2nd century. This is unique photograph as the sculpture was destroyed in 1992 by the Taliban.

Many of the statues are three-dimensional representations in-the-round, a rare instance in the area of Hadda, which related the style of Tapa Shotor to the Hellenistic art of Bactria, and to the Buddhist caves of Xinjiang such as the Mogao Caves, probably directly inspired by these.

Various niches display scenes of the Buddha surrounded by attendants (especially niches V1, V2, V3). Niche XIII, or "aquatic niche", also demonstrates sculpture in the round, and depicts Naga Kalika predicting the success of the Bodhisattva towards attaining enlightenment. The niche is dated to the period 250-350 CE, and is probably synchronous with the clay sculptures of Temple II in Penjikent. These sculptures are made of clay. Later sculptures molded in stucco can also be seen at the site.

Alexander and Herakles sitting next to the Buddha as Vajrapani in sculptural art at Tapa-Shotor is developed in a broader context by Lucas Christopoulos.

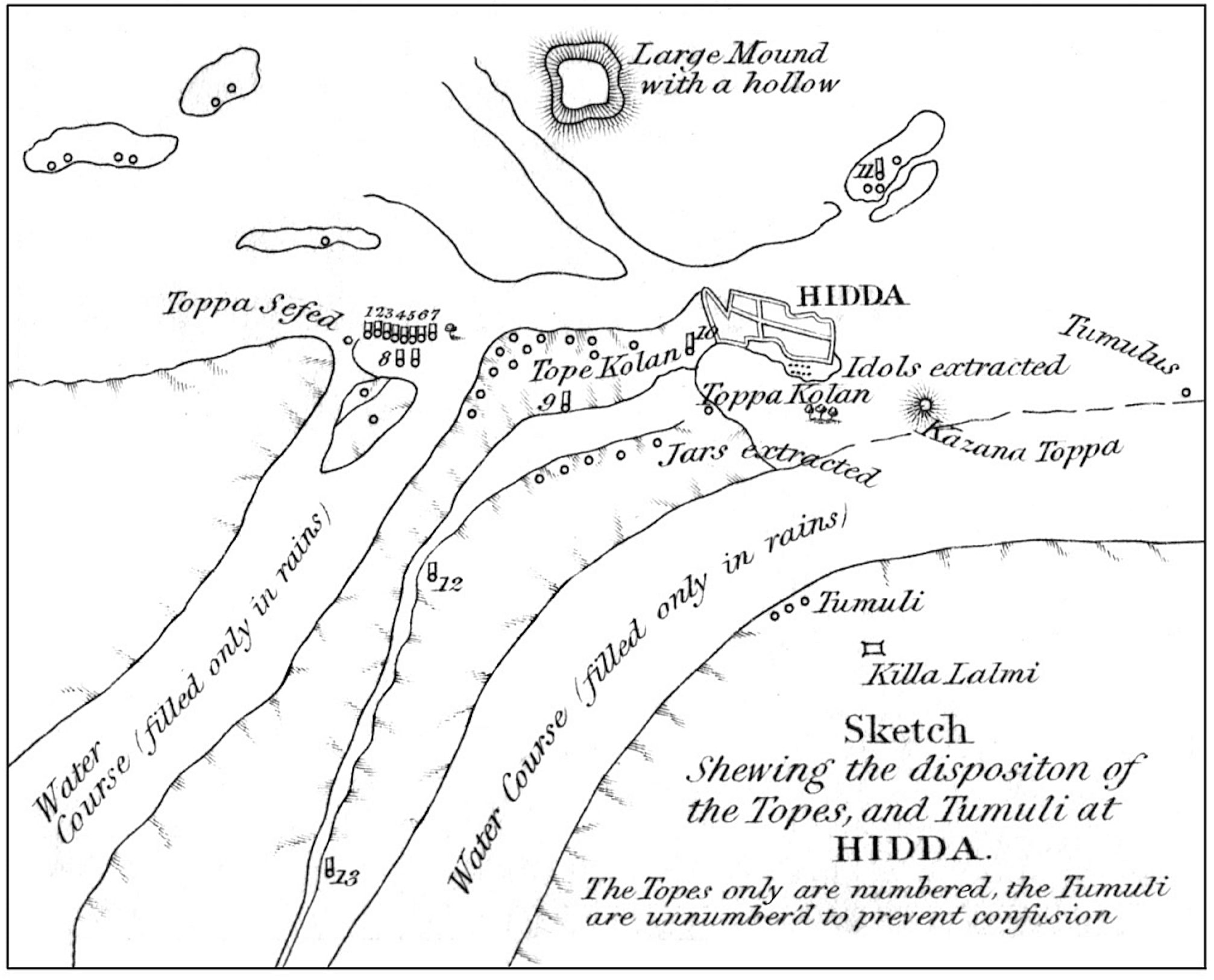
Map of Hadda, by Charles Masson in 1841. Tapa Shotor was the "Large Mound with a hollow".

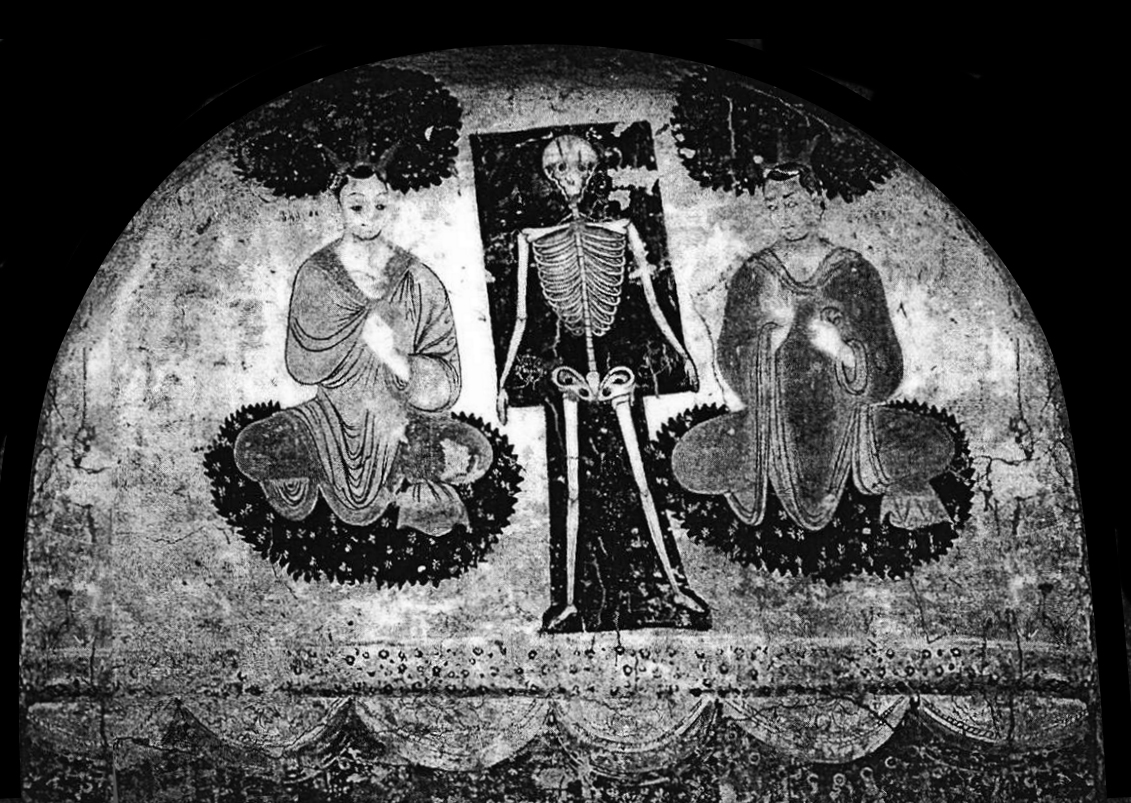
Painting of an underground meditation chamber lunette. Tapa Shotor, period VI (350-450 CE).

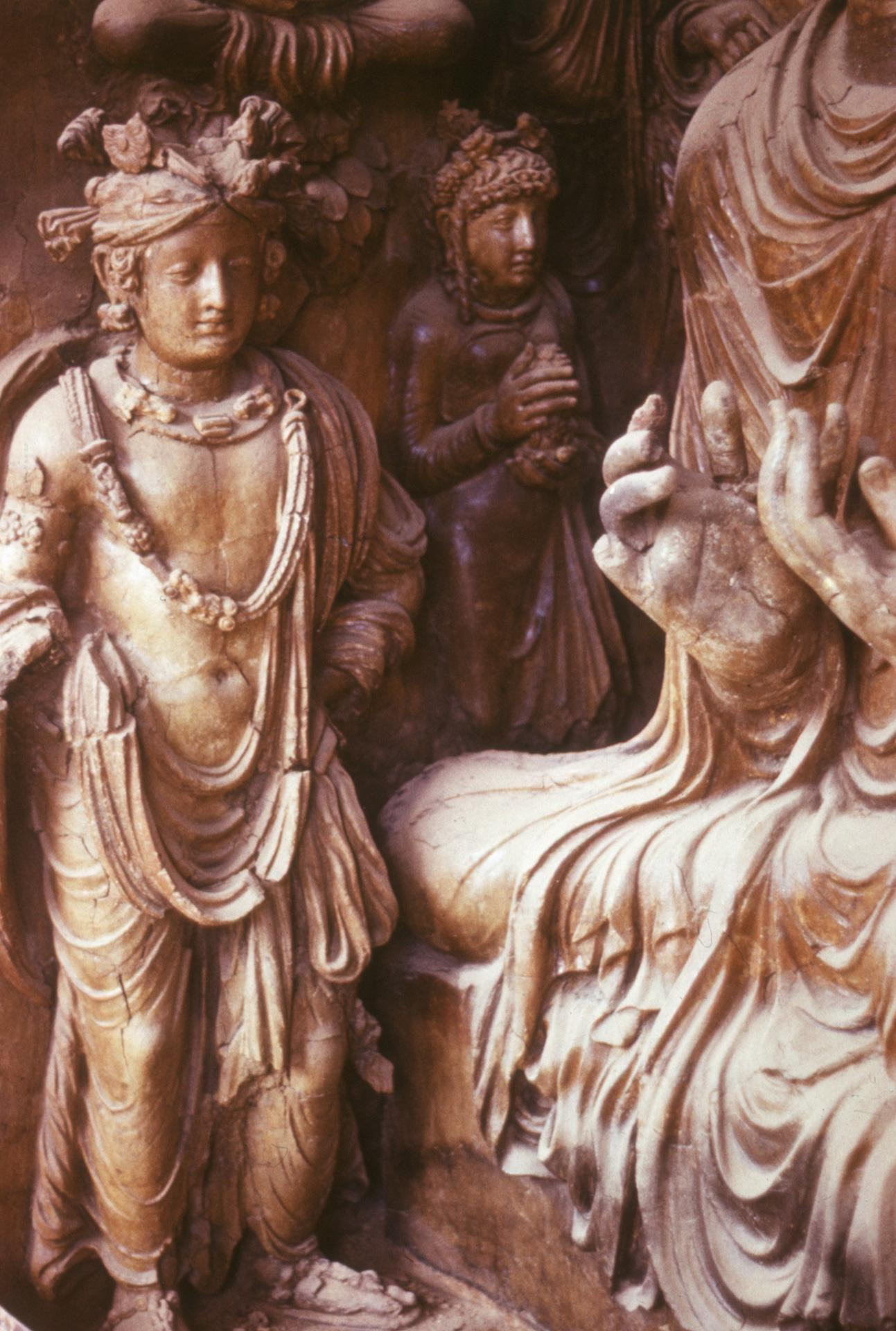
Attendants to the Buddha, Tapa Shotor (Niche V1)

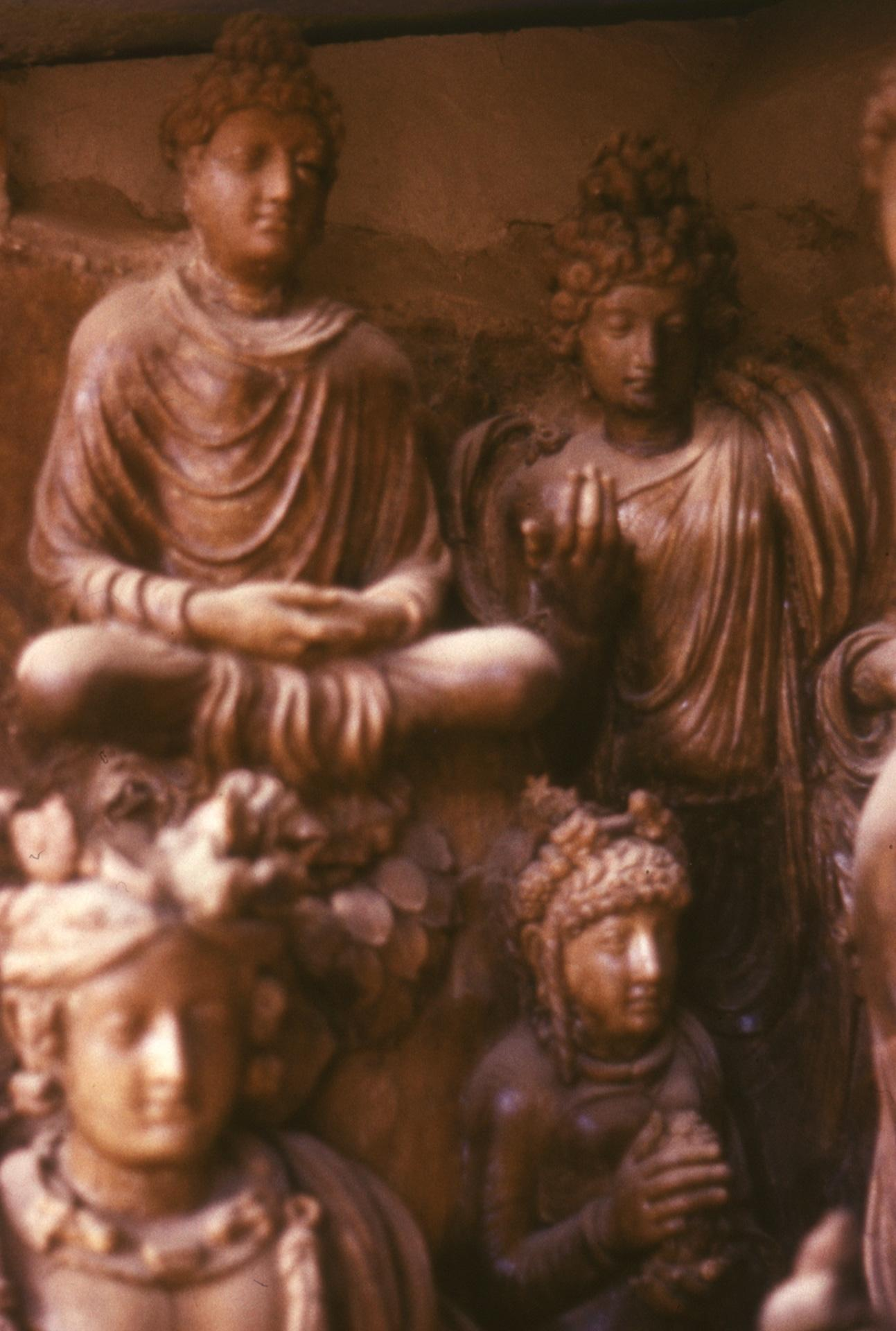
Buddha attendants, Tapa Shotor (Niche V1)

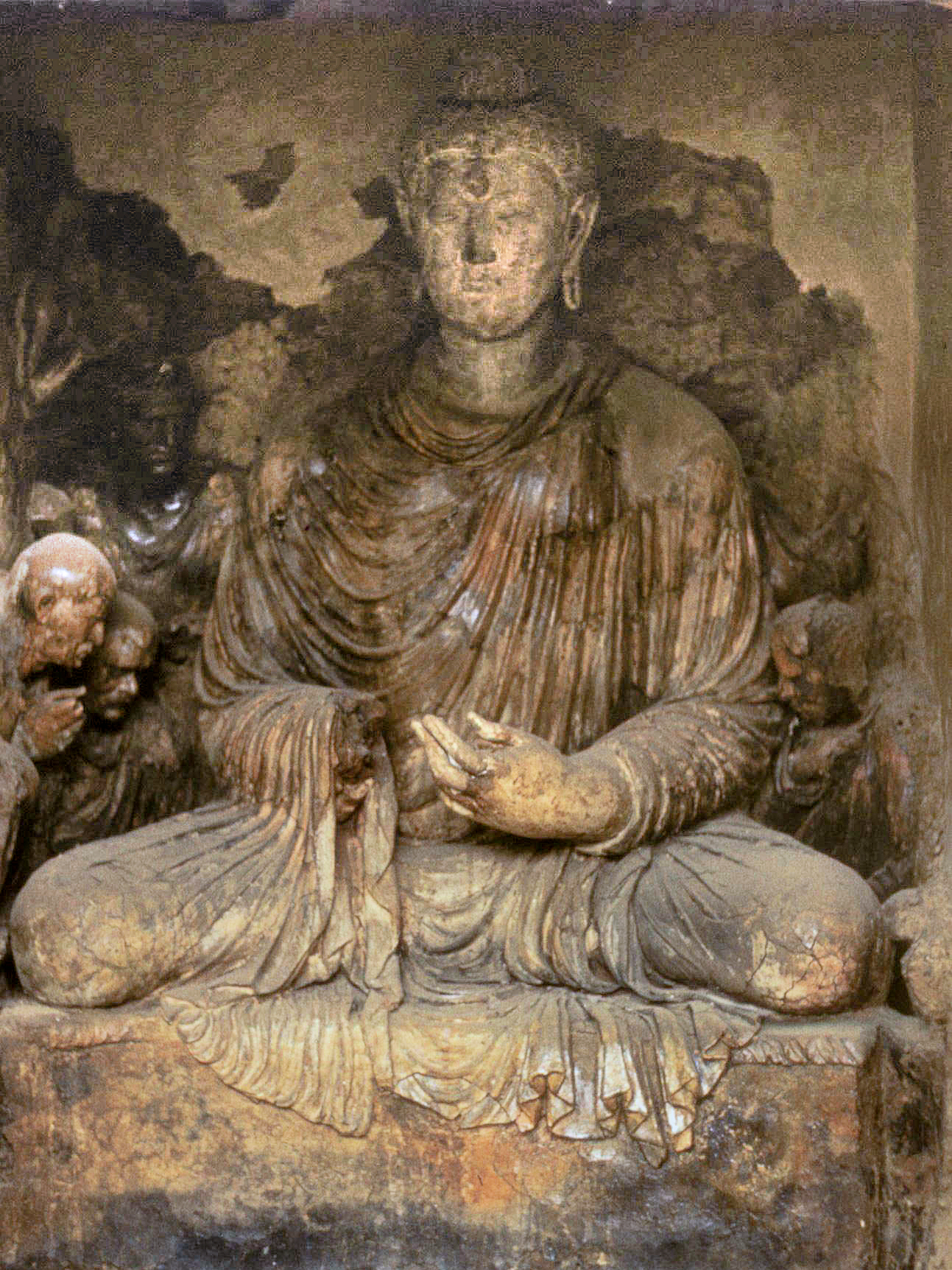
Seated Buddha with Vajrapani-Alexander attendant. Tapa Shotor (Niche V3).

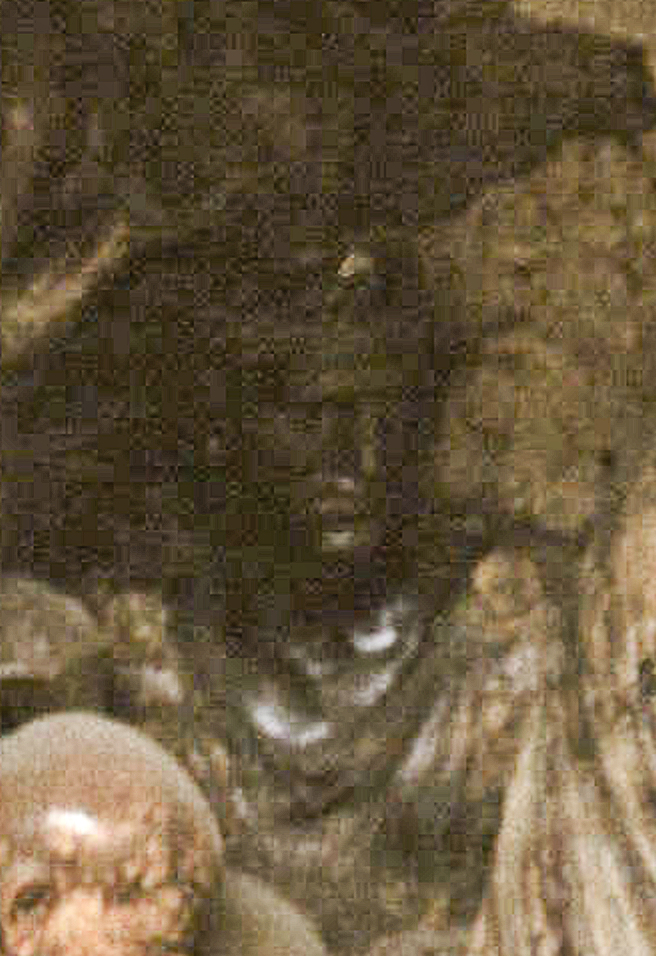
Head of "Vajrapani-Alexander", Tapa (Niche V3).

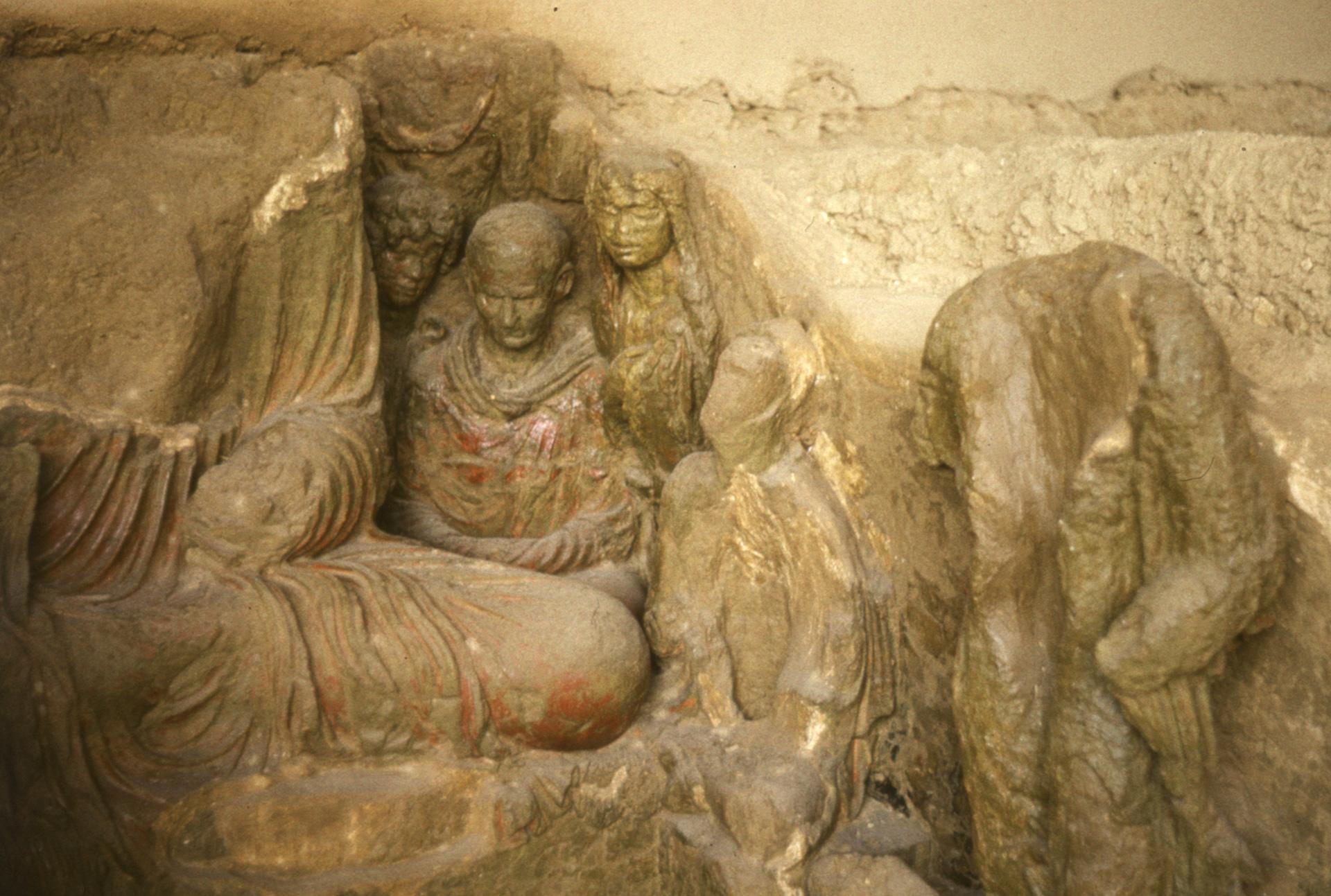
Buddha attendants, Tapa Shotor

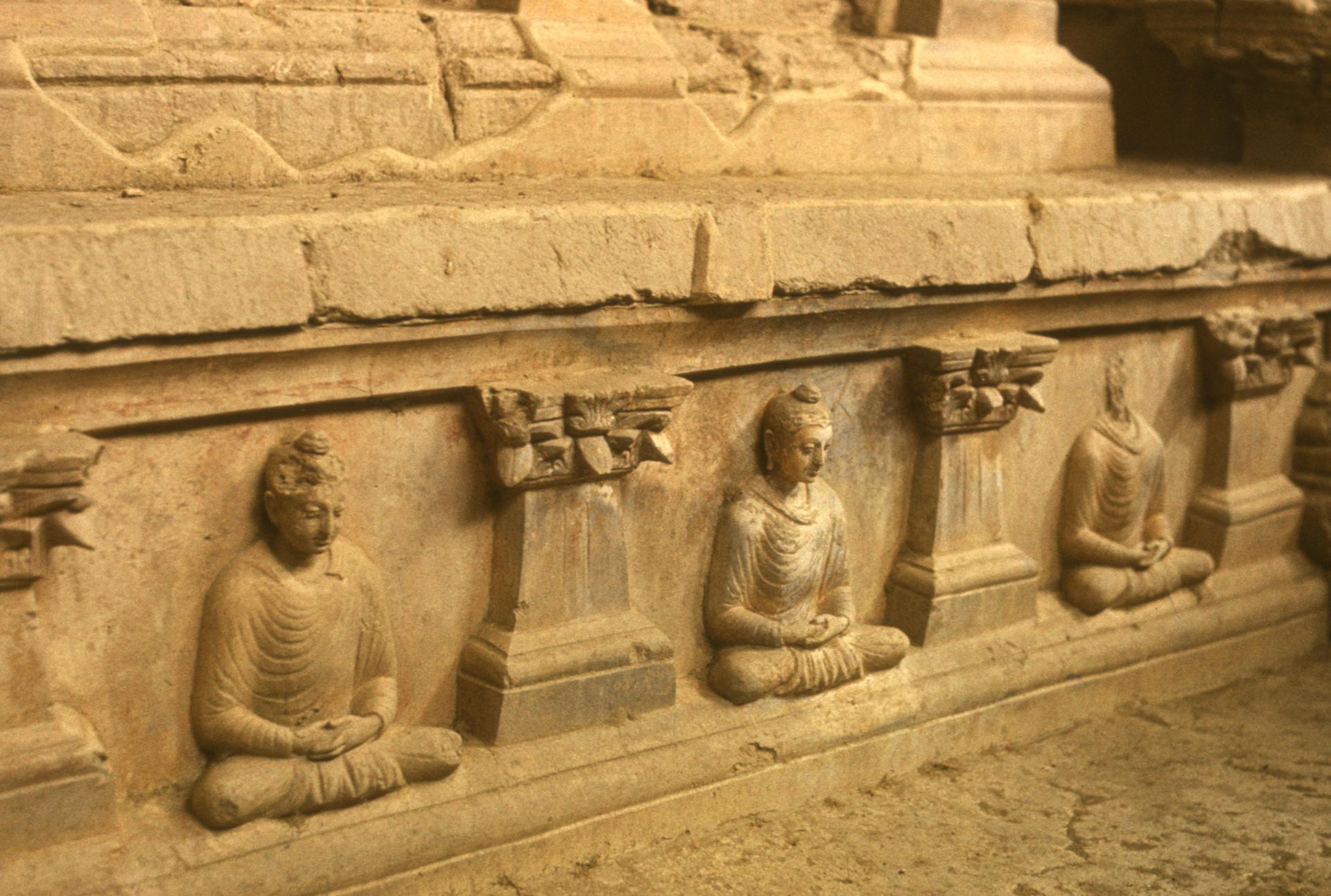
Small decorated stupas in Tapa Shotor.

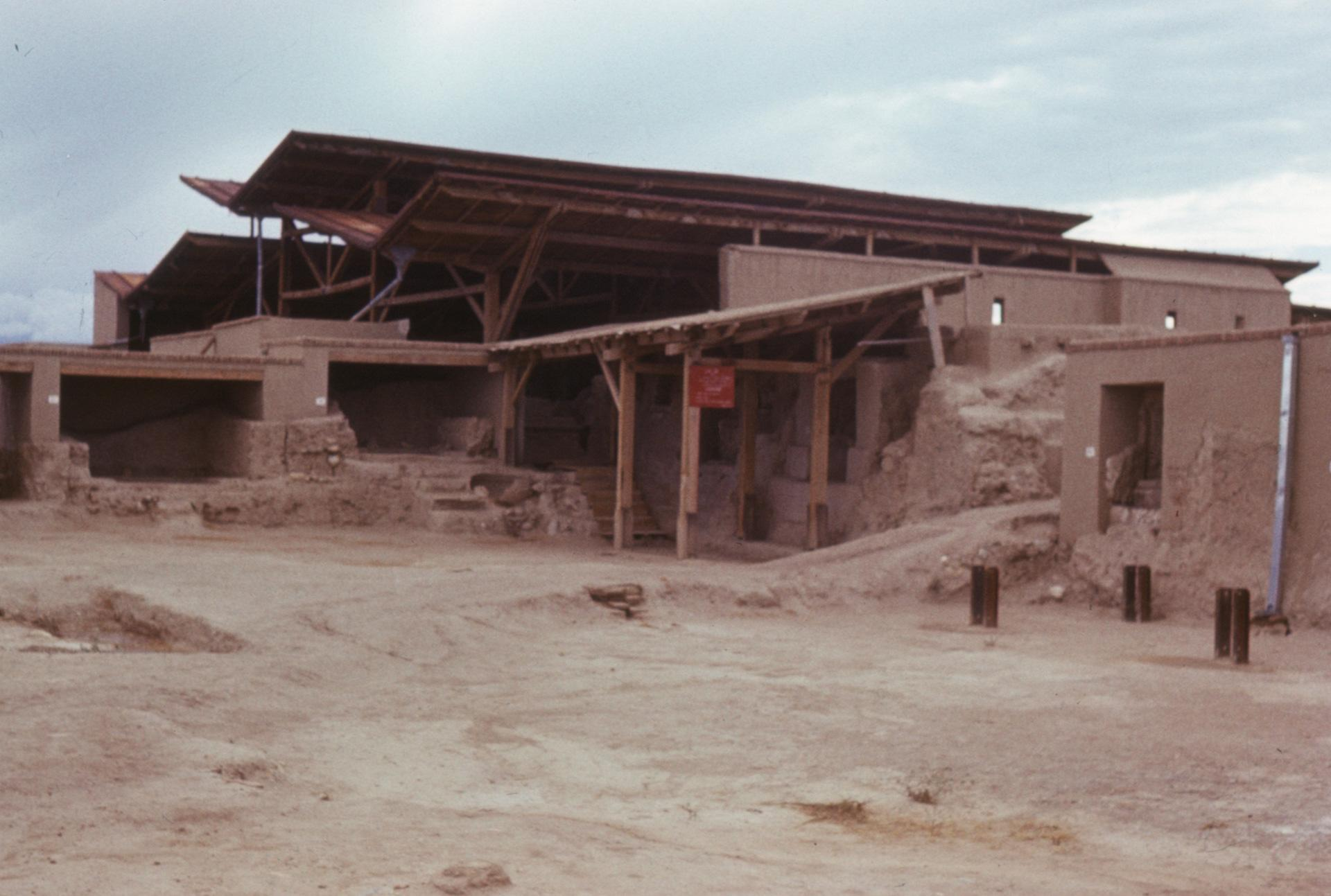
Site of Tapa Shotor, with a protective roof.
