= Champtala =

Refugee camp in Nangarhar Province, Afghanistan

Champtala (Pashto: چمپټالا) is a refugee camp in Surkh Rod District, Nangarhar Province, Afghanistan.

The camp holds (as of December 2008) over 1,250 refugees who have returned to Afghanistan from Pakistan. Some of the refugees travel 30 km to the city of Jalalabad to work as laborers.

The camp receives some water and facilities from UNHCR and UNICEF. Health assistance is provided by CWS, HNI, and the Afghan Ministry of Public Health.

== See also ==
- Nangarhar Province

== Sources ==
- ACT International. Drought & Food Insecurity. Geneva, 4 December 2008.
