= Ahmed Gailani =

Afghan religious and political leader (1932–2017)

Pir Sayyid Ahmed Gailani
- پیر سید احمد گیلانی
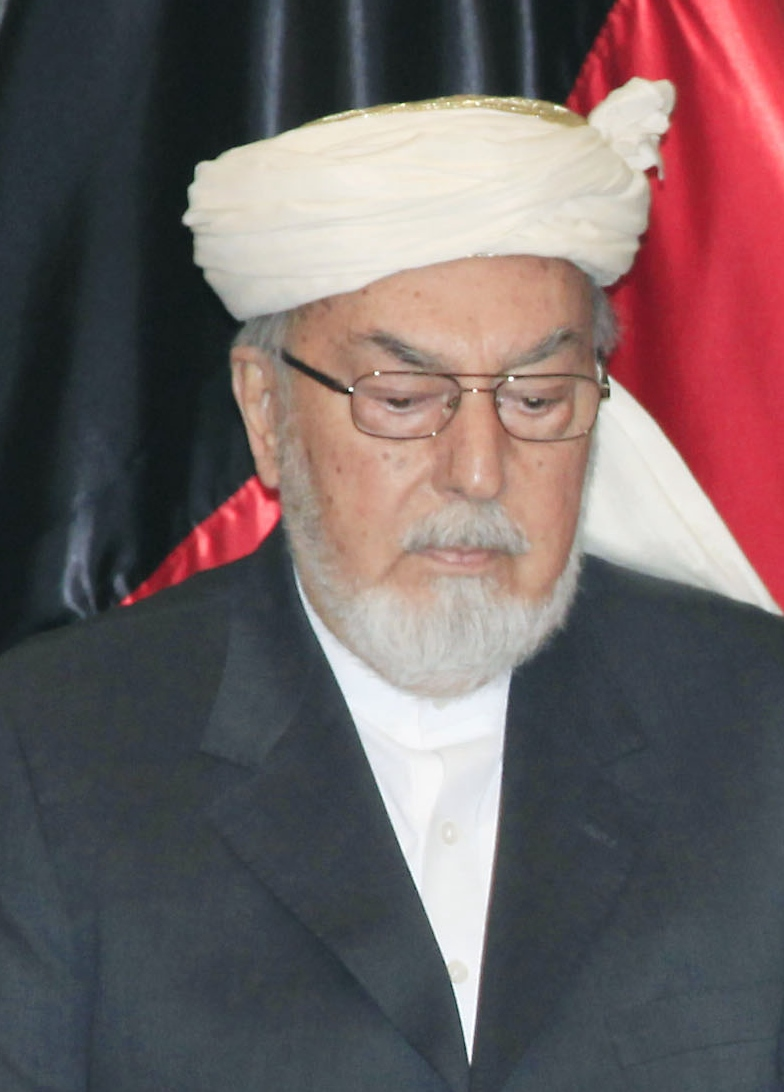
- Gailani in September 2014

Personal life
- Born: 1932 Surkh-Rōd District, Nangarhar Province, Kingdom of Afghanistan
- Died: 21 January 2017 (aged 84–85) Kabul, Afghanistan
- Home town: Surkh-Rōd
- Children: 5
- Parent: Sayyid Hasan Gailani (father)
- Education: Kabul University

Religious life
- Religion: Islam
- Order: Qadiriyya Sufi
- Lineage: Abdul-Qadir Gilani

Pir Sayyid Ahmed Gailani (Persian: پیر سید احمد گیلانی; 1932 – 21 January 2017) was the leader (Pir) of the Qadiriyyah Sufi order in Afghanistan, and the founder of the National Islamic Front of Afghanistan (Mahaz-i-Milli Islami ye Afghanistan), a party that was associated with the Mujahideen who led the war against the Soviet Union in the 1980s.

== Life and work ==
Sayyid Ahmed Gailani was born in 1932 in Surkh-Rōd District, Nangarhar Province. His family are descended from Abdul-Qadir Gilani, the founder of the Qadiriyyah Sufi order. His father, Sayyid Hasan Gailani, was born in Baghdad before moving to Afghanistan in 1905 in order to establish the Qadiriyyah order in that country. Amir Habibullah Khan gave him land in Kabul and the eastern Nangarhar Province.

Ahmed Gailani was born in the Surkh-Rōd District of Nangarhar Province of Afghanistan, where he remains a significant figure. He studied at Abu Hanifa College in Kabul, before graduating at the Faculty of Theology of Kabul University in 1960. In 1952, he reinforced his family's close ties to the Afghan royal family by marrying Adela, a granddaughter of Amir Habibullah.

Prior to the war, Gailani invested more time in his business career than in the leadership of his Sufi tariqah, often travelling to France and England. Through his connection with the monarchy, he was able to obtain the Peugeot dealership in Kabul.

In 1979, after the communist PDPA had come to power, Pir Gailani fled to Pakistan where he created the National Islamic Front of Afghanistan, a moderate royalist faction. This party was one of the seven used by the Pakistani ISI for distributing CIA-funded weapons to the mujahideen fighting the Soviet occupation. NIFA had the most liberal stance of all the Peshawar parties, and it supported the return of King Zahir Shah from exile. Representing the interests of the pre-war Pashtun establishment, it rejected both communism and Islamism, in favour of "nationalism and democracy."

Gailani was distinct from the six other mujahideen leaders in favoring Western dress and being fluent in English. He was however criticized for weak leadership and ineffectiveness.

Gailani's constituency was drawn from the following of the Qadiryyah, and his group functioned like a Sufi order, greatly hampering its efficiency as a political and military organisation. The followers of the pir always expected to interact with him personally, which meant that the party functioned like a court, centered on Gailani and his children, rather than like a modern party. No decision was ever delegated. The quantity of weapons a NIFA mujahideen commander could expect to receive depended mostly on his personal relation with the pir. Also the pir's tradition of generosity led to many abuses, with many party officials receiving essentially fictitious posts through personal contacts.

Despite this, NIFA remained the most popular party among the Afghan refugees living in Pakistan. A poll carried out in 1987 revealed that 456 refugees out of a sample of 2,000 supported NIFA, which was the highest score of any of the mujahideen parties. By contrast, the Pakistanis, judging the group inefficient allocated NIFA only 10-11 percent of the weapons procured by the CIA, with a much larger share going to Islamist groups, in particular Hekmatyar's Hezb-e-Islami Gulbuddin. However, the sample of this survey has been noted as suspect, since it mostly included "educated" refugees and thereby ignored the many refugees that were illiterate or poor. The educated class was more favourable towards Zahir and thereby NIFA. (Citation, Gilles Dorronsoro, Revolution Unending, 2005).

Outside of the ISI, Gailani had few links with foreign patrons (unlike the Islamists who had ties in the Arab world), but he did receive some support from American conservative lobbying groups such as the Committee for a Free Afghanistan, an emanation of the Heritage Foundation, and Freedom House. He was also associated with Lord Bethell of the London-based Radio Free Kabul.

In October 2001, Pir Ahmed Gailani headed a group of Afghan leaders, the Assembly for Peace and National Unity of Afghanistan, which attempted to win over moderate elements in the Taliban.

== Death ==
Peer Sayed Ahmad Gilani died in the evening of January 21, 2017 at a hospital in Kabul after a short illness.

== Children ==
- Fatima Gailani, Former President of the Afghan Red Crescent Society.
- Sayed Hamed Gailani, Former First Deputy Speaker of Afghanistan's Senate, Now Leader of the National Islamic Front of Afghanistan.
- Maryam Gailani, Founder of Shamsa Children's Village and Adela Foundation.
- Sayed Mohammed Gailani, Former Afghan Ambassador to the Hashemite Kingdom of Jordan.
- Zahra Gailani, Creator of Zdsuzani.
