= Sanglakh Range =

Mountain range in Afghanistan

The Sanglakh Range (Pashto: د سنګلاخ لړۍ) is an offshoot of the Hindu Kush, just west of Kabul in Maidan Wardak Province, Afghanistan. Its main peak is the Unai; both the Helmand and Kabul rivers rise in the Sanglakh Range, separated by the Unai Pass.
