= Surkhab River =

River in Afghanistan

The Surkhab (Pashto: سرخاب) is a river in Afghanistan, which flows in the provinces of Paktia and Nangarhar. It is a tributary of the Kabul River, which in turn is a tributary of Pakistan's Indus River.

== Course ==
The river rises in the district of Azra in the far north of Paktia Province, but for most of its course flows in the province of Nangarhar. It gives its name to the district of Surkh Rod. The river flows north-east, then east, to the north of the western part of the Safed Koh mountains, from which it receives meltwater from glaciers. It joins the Kabul River some 10 km west of Jalalabad.

== Tributaries ==
The Surkhab receives many tributaries, especially on its right bank from the snows of the Spin Ghar range. The main right tributaries of the Surkhab are the Anderab and Khanabad rivers.
