= Kabul River =

River in Afghanistan and Pakistan

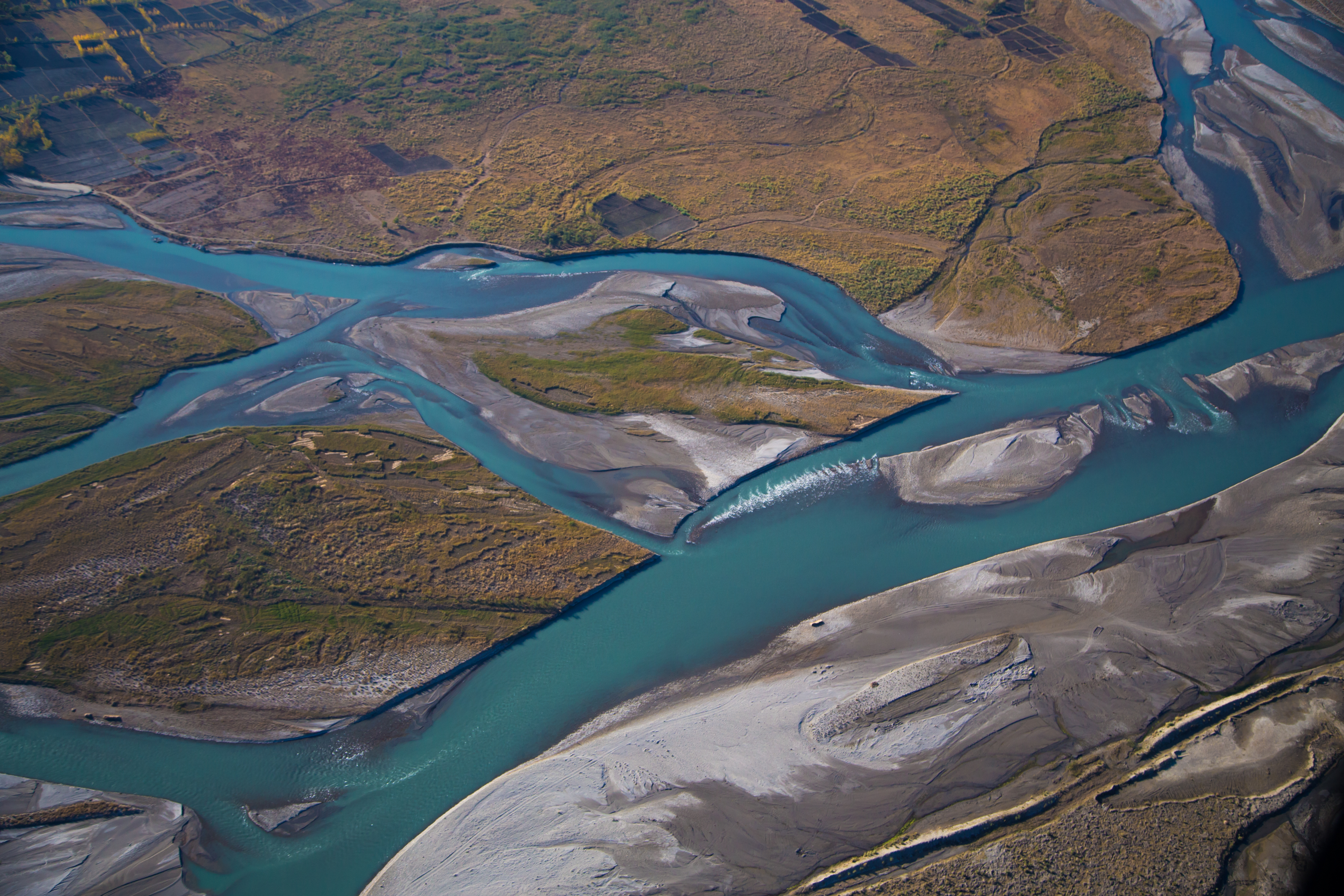
- Aerial photo of Kabul River flood-plain east of Kabul, Afghanistan

Location
- Countries: Afghanistan and Pakistan
- Cities: Kabul, Surobi, Jalalabad (Afghanistan); Peshawar, Charsadda, Nowshera (Pakistan)

Physical characteristics
- Source: Hindu Kush Mountains
  - location: Near Maidan Shar, Maidan Wardak, Afghanistan
  - coordinates: 34.357°N 68.8392°E
  - elevation: 2,400 m (7,900 ft)
- Mouth: Indus River
  - location: Near Kund Park, Attock, Punjab, Pakistan
  - coordinates: 33°55′0″N 72°13′56″E
- Length: 700 km (430 mi)
- Basin size: 70,500 km^{2} (27,200 sq mi)
- Discharge
  - location: Nowshehra
  - average: 800 m^{3}/s (28,000 cu ft/s)

Basin features
- Progression: Indus→ Arabian Sea
- Tributaries
  - left: Panjshir River, Alingar River, Chitral River, Swat River
  - right: Logar River, Surkhab River, Bara River

The Kabul River (Note: Pashto: د کابل سیند, romanized: Də Kābəl Sind; Dari: دریای کابل, romanized: Daryā-yi Kābul) is a 700-kilometre-long (430 mi) river that emerges in the Sanglakh Range of the Hindu Kush mountains in the northeastern part of Maidan Wardak Province, Afghanistan. It is separated from the watershed of the Helmand River by the Unai Pass. The Kabul River empties into the Indus River near Attock, Pakistan. It is the major river in eastern Afghanistan and the Khyber Pakhtunkhwa province of Pakistan.

== Names ==
Kabul River was known as the Kubha (Sanskrit: कुभा, romanized: Kubhā) and Cophen (Ancient Greek: Κωφήν, romanized: Kōphḗn; /ˈkoʊfeɪn/) in ancient times.

The word Kubhā which is the ancient name of the river is both a Sanskrit and Avestan word. The word later changed to Kābul.

Al-Biruni, a Persian polymath, also called it "the River of Ghorwand".

The Kabul River later gave its name to the region and to the settlement of Kabul.

== Course ==
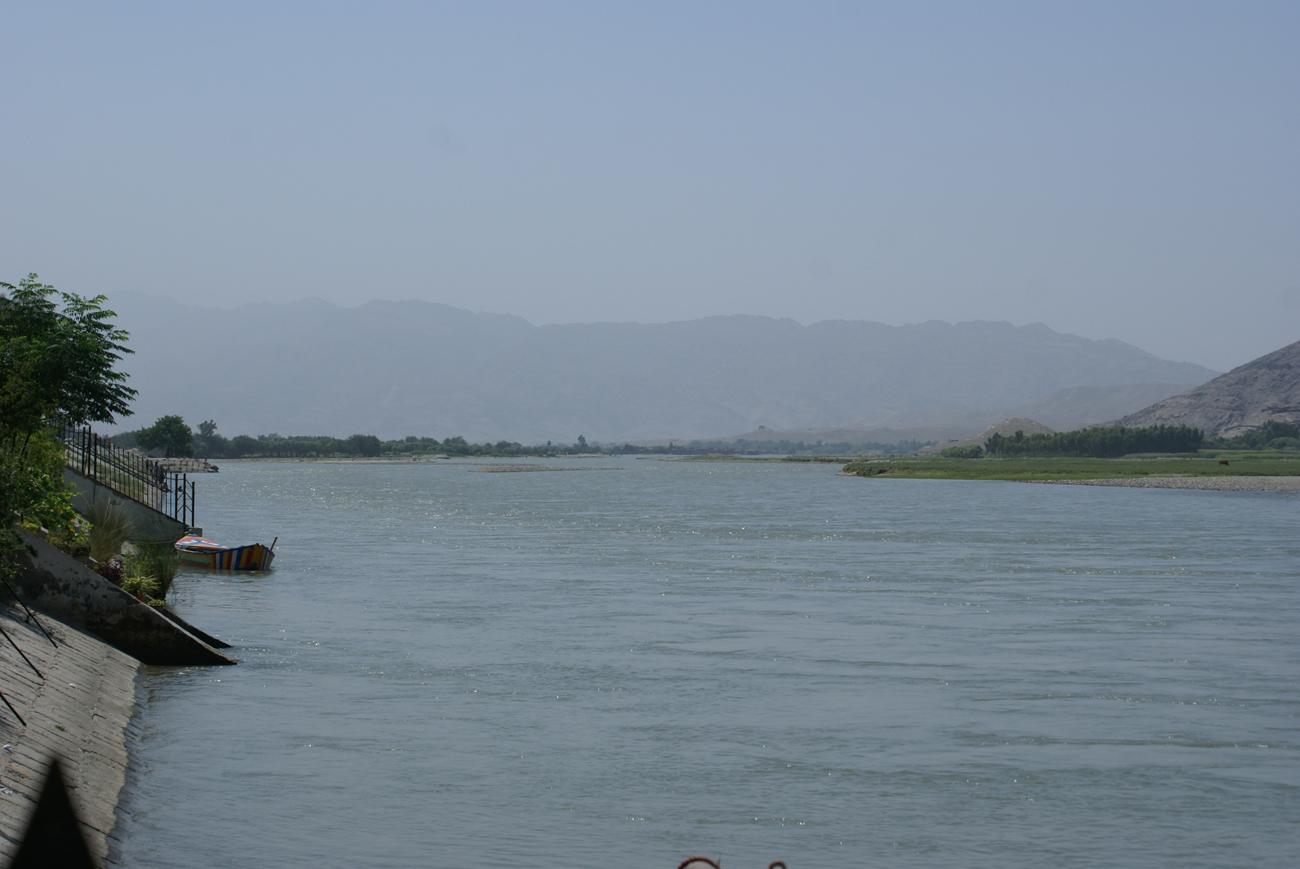
Kabul River near Behsood Bridge, Jalalabad, 2009

The Kabul River, which measures 700 kilometres or 435 miles long, rises in the Sanglākh Range at Sar Čašma, located at an elevation of 14,000 feet above sea level in the Kōh-e Bābā mountains northwest of Kabul. It passes through the cities of Kabul and Jalalabad in Afghanistan. Its large drainage basin covers the eastern provinces of Nangarhār, Kunar, Laghmān, Lōgar, Kabul, Kāpisā, Parwān, Panjshēr, and Bāmyān before it flows into Khyber Pakhtunkhwa in Pakistan some 25 kilometres (16 mi) north of the Durand Line border crossing at Torkham.

In Khyber Pakhtunkhwa, the river passes through the cities of Peshawar, Charsadda, and Nowshera. The major tributaries of the Kabul River are the Logar, Panjshir, Alingar, Surkhab, Chitral, Bara, and Swat rivers.

== Hydrology ==
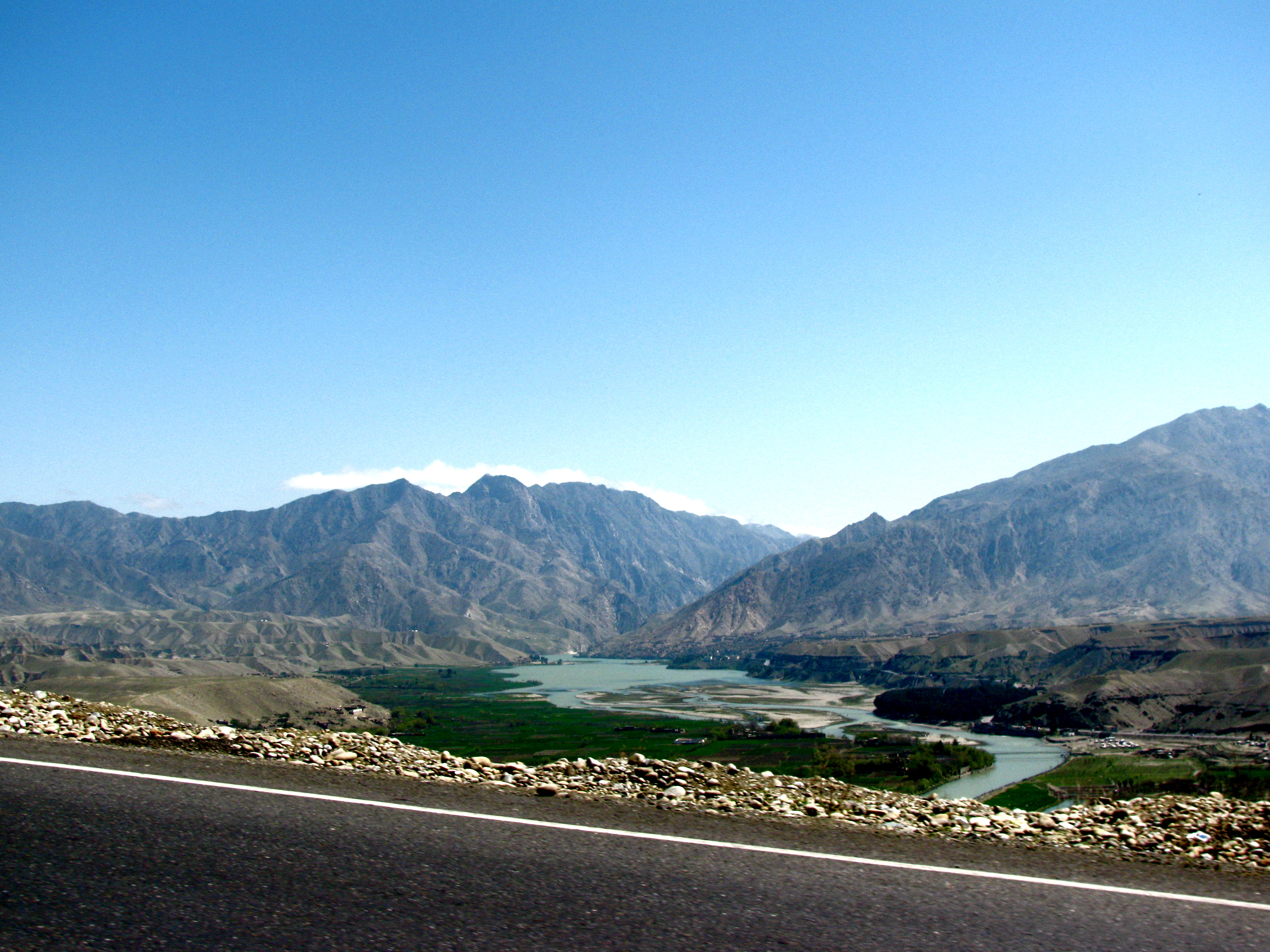
The Kabul River Valley

The Kabul River is little more than a trickle for most of the year, but swells in summer due to melting snows in the Hindu Kush Range. Its largest tributary is the Chitral River, which starts out as the Mastuj River, flowing from the Chiantar Glacier in Brughil Valley in Chitral, Pakistan and after flowing south into Afghanistan it is met by the Bashgal River flowing from Nurestan. The Chitral meets the Kabul near Jalalabad. In spite of the Chitral carrying more water than the Kabul, the river continues as the Kabul River after this confluence, mainly for the political and historical significance of the name. The annual mean discharge near Nowshehra just before it falls into Indus is 800 m^{3}/s (28,000 cu ft/s); out of which Chitral River contributes over 288 m^{3}/s (10,200 cu ft/s), while Swat River which joins it near Charsadda contributes over 280 m^{3}/s (9,900 cu ft/s).

=== Dams ===
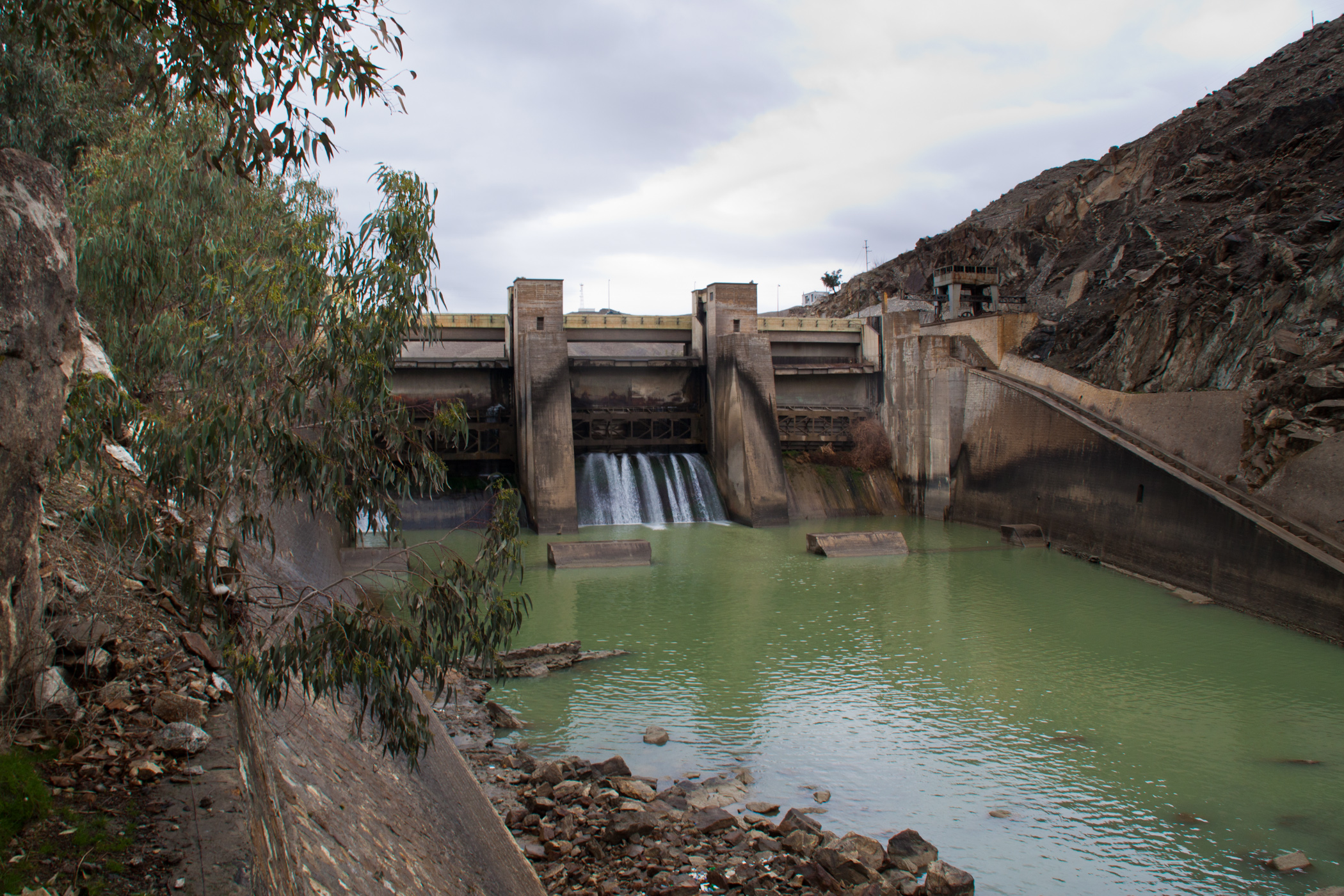
A dam on Kabul River

The Kabul River is impounded by several dams that were constructed in the 20th century. Three dams are located in the Kabul and Nangarhar provinces of Afghanistan, including the Surobi dam, a hydroelectric source for Kabul constructed 1957 with assistance by Germany, the Naghlu and the Darunta dams which were built by Soviet scientists in the 1960s. The Warsak Dam is also in the Peshawar Valley in Pakistan, approximately 20 km northwest of the city of Peshawar.

== History ==
=== Expedition of Alexander the Great into Asia ===
In Arrian's The Campaigns of Alexander, the River Kabul is referred to as Κωφήν Kōphēn (Latin spelling Cophen). In the Second Book of the Life of Apollonius of Tyana by Philostratus, Apollonius fords the Cophen on his way from crossing the Caucasus to the Indus Valley.

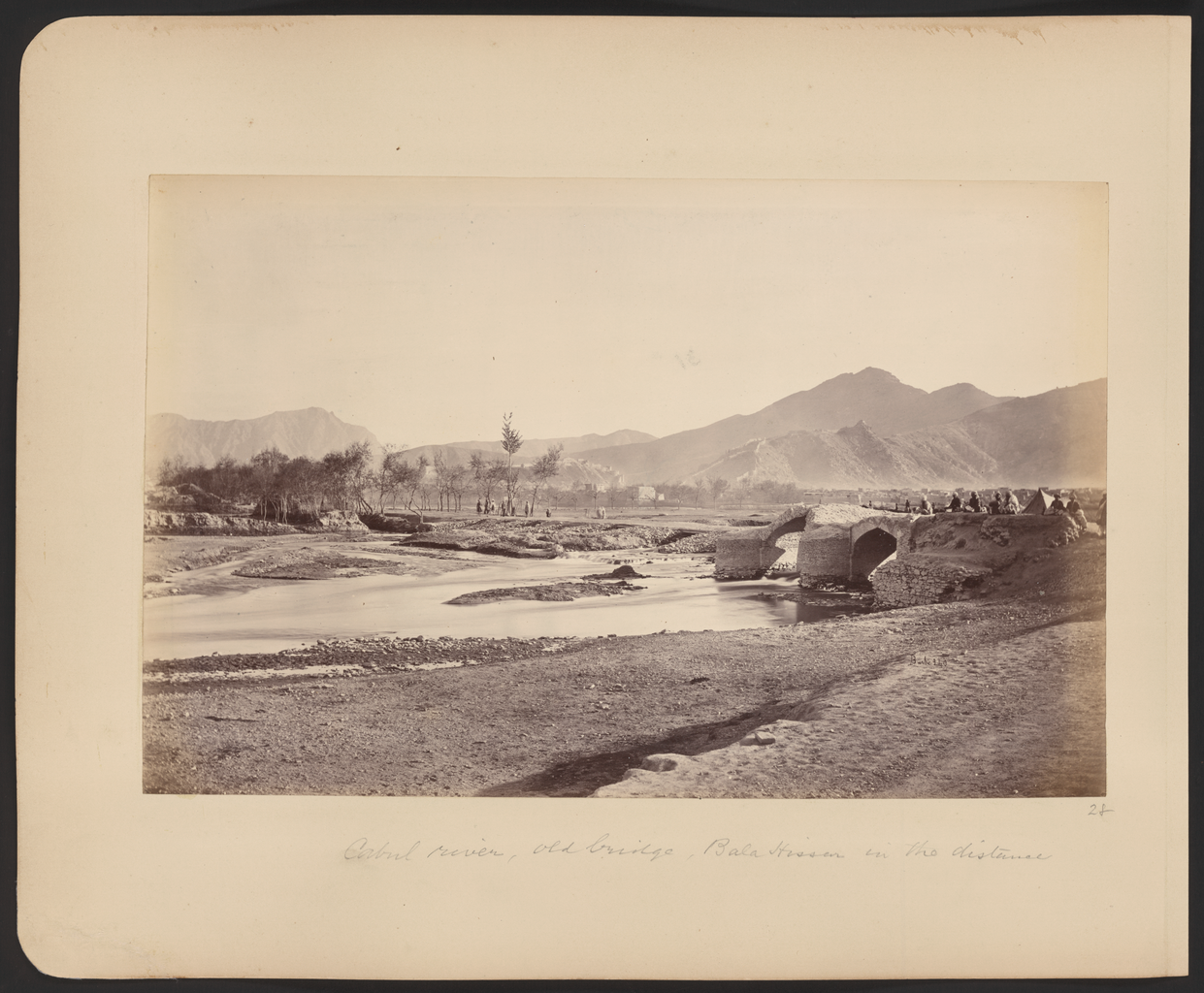
One of five bridges over Kabul River, pictured during the Second Anglo-Afghan War (1878–1880). Bala Hissar (High Fort) is in the background just visible through the heat haze and trees.

=== Modern era ===
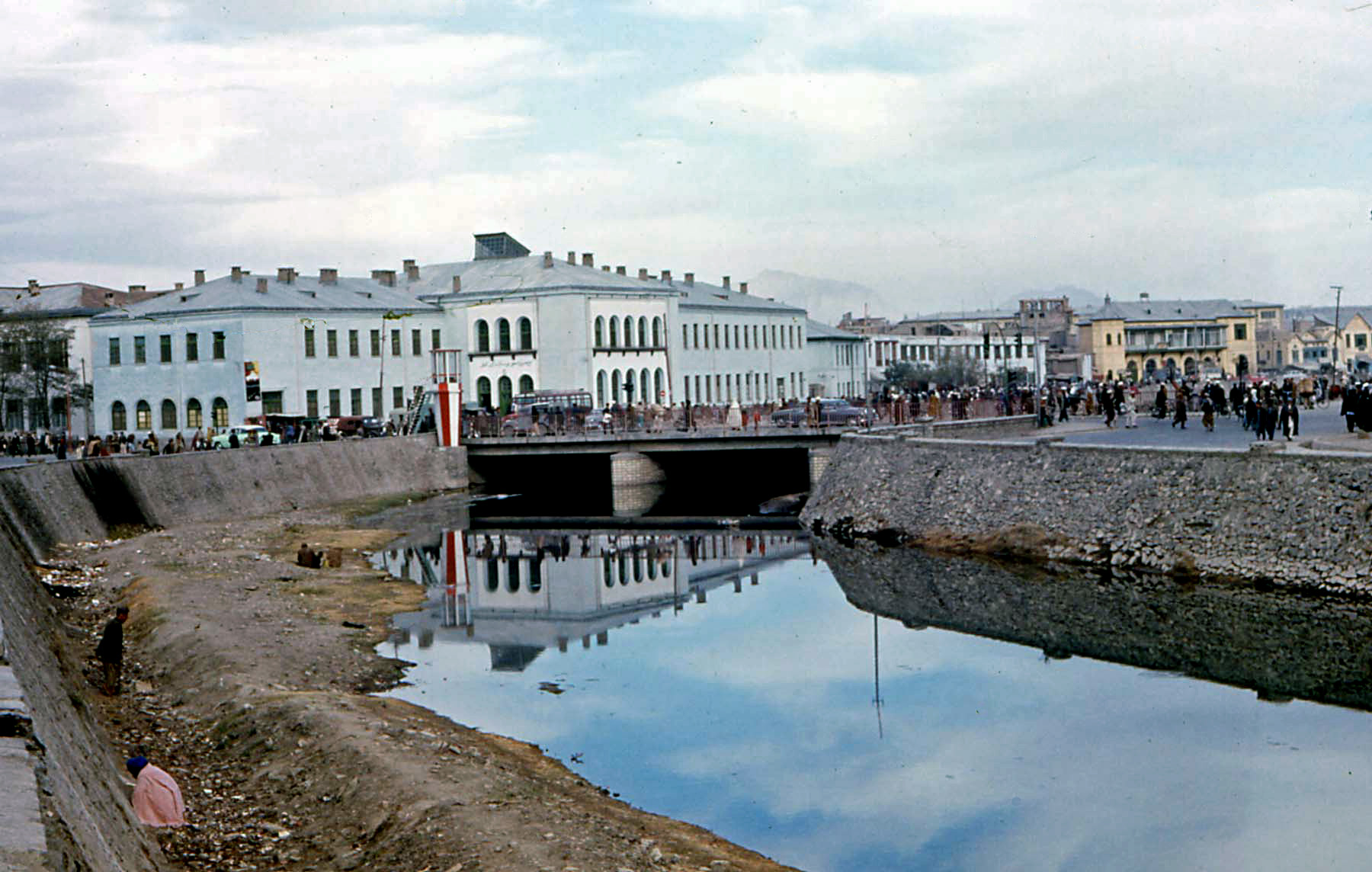
The Kabul River flowing through Kabul City, 1966

Since the 1990s, the river has experienced substantial droughts in summer. In approximately March 2019, ten of thousands of gallons of untreated sewage from the Makroyan Waste Water Treatment Plant has been dumped into the Kabul River each month, reportedly causing gastrointestinal issues among the 3,000 families that live along the river.

== See also ==
- List of rivers of Afghanistan
- List of rivers of Pakistan
