= Surkh-Rōd District =

District of Nangarhar, Afghanistan

Coordinates: 34°24′N 70°22′E

Surkh-Rōd (Pashto: سرخ سړک) also spelled as Surkh-Rūd or Sorkh-Rūd, also called Sra-rod or Sra- road, is a district in the northern part of Nangarhar Province, Afghanistan. The district centre is the town of Sultanpur. It has abundance of fertile land; however, it is currently facing a lack of water.

The district takes its name from the Surkh Rod river, also known as the Surkhab, which flows through the district. The district is also called Sra Rod or Sra Road, sra in Pashto and surkh in Persian means red. Rod mean river or canal. In time of Taliban the district's official name was Sra Rod.

== Governance ==
=== District Leadership ===
- As of 12 February 2009, the district governor of Surkh Rod district is Said Ali Akbar.

== Education ==
The Hope of Mother School educates more than 400 students in the rural Shamsha Pur village in Surkh Rod District, Afghanistan.

== Demographics ==
The district's population, which is least 99% Pashtun (40% are Dari speaking originally Pashtuns who live in Shamsa Pur, Sultan Pur and Bakhtaan villages) and 1% other eastern-Iranian groups (mostly sub-groups of the Tajiks), was estimated at 124,161 in 2002. The district previously had a small Hindu minority, which fled during the conflict period of the late 20th century, and as of 2002 had not returned.

== Infrastructure ==
On June 16, 2009, the PRT in Nangarhar with the construction of the qali pacha footbridge. The PRT visited the district to inspect construction sites and provide updates to locals regarding PRT projects. The bridge, funded by the Nangarhar Provincial Reconstruction Team, will allow villagers to easily cross a river to get to services such as schools and clinics. The footbridge will also provide a safe passageway over a river for the villagers in the area.

== Commerce ==
The Surkh Rod Packing Facility, which is run entirely by women and sanitation-certified, processed a total of 61,525 kg of various high value fruits and vegetables for Kabul and other markets in this quarter between July and September 2008. Preparations are underway to privatize the facility. In the last quarter, the facility received acceptable rating and has been approved and listed in the Directory of Sanitary Approved Food Establishment for Armed Forces Procurement for storage and distribution of fresh fruit and vegetables. During the reporting period, the facility processed 61,524 kg of various high value vegetables for traders from Jalalabad Fruit and Vegetable Wholesalers Association. Another major source of income for the women of Surkh Rod is a thriving bead industry, where the women refashion the local Sarahns tree seeds into decorative bead jewelry. ADP/E also conducted outreach to new potential clients, and continued conducting hygiene education classes for the packhouse staff.

== Agriculture ==
The irrigation system in Surkh Rod is fed from ten intakes on the Surkh Rod River. The system is designed to irrigate 180 hectares of land serving the farms of three main villages in Surkh Rod District. The main crops grown in this system are wheat and seasonal vegetables. The old irrigation system consisted of temporary intakes without gates on the river and a network of secondary canals. The designed works allowed construction of 10 masonry intake structures with diversion gates and distributor structures with new steel gates. One concrete canal culvert was also built.

=== Opium ===
A survey conducted by United Nations Office on Drugs and Crime noted a large decrease in poppy cultivation in Surkh Rod district, from 1,440 ha in 2002, to 118 ha in 2003 (-92%).

== Natural Disasters ==
Flash floods caused by torrential rains struck Surkh Rod district in the Nangarhar province (Jalalabad region) of eastern Afghanistan on 10 November 2006. In Ziarak village (Surkh rod district), located 35 kilometres west of Jalalabad city. The floods affected 18 families, injured one person, killed more than 100 livestock and destroyed about 247 acres (1.00 km^{2}) of agricultural land.

== Human Rights ==
=== Refugees ===
As of 2008, in Surkh Rod district alone, over 1,250 returnee families were living in the Champtala camps, without having access to even basic facilities such as shelter, potable water and sanitation. All of these families are residing in tents provided by aid agencies. UNICEF and UNHCR occasionally provide clean water, but most of the time residents have to rely on local water sources that are located at considerable distances from the camp. Some of the returnee residents go as far as Jalalabad, 30 km away from the camp, in search of employment as laborers. However, most of them do not even have the resources to travel these distances. Limited health assistance is being provided to these returnees by CWS, HealthNet International (HNI) and the Ministry of Public Health of Afghanistan (MoPH).

== Security ==
On July 30, 2007, the Mine Action Programme for Afghanistan (MAPA) completed 31 minefield and battlefield tasks in July alone, benefiting more than 100 communities across the country including Surkh Rod district. In support of International Day of Peace on September 21, 2007, the MAPA handed over the cleared land, including villages, roads and pastures, to community members. The land could be used for farming and housing, contributing to peace and development in Afghanistan. During the clearance, the MAPA destroyed anti-personnel mines, anti-tank mines and pieces of unexploded ordnance (UXO).

== Notable residents ==
- Hamidullah Qalandarzai, governor of Khost Province.
- Fazlullah Wahidi, governor of Kunar Province.
- Ghazi Bismillah khan
- Ahmad Gailani
