= Zemaryalai Tarzi =

Afghan archaeologist

Zemaryalai Tarzi (Pashto: زمریالی طرزی; 1939 – 19 July 2024) was an Afghan-born French archaeologist. He was related to Ghulam Muhammad Tarzi of Afghanistan.

Born in Kabul in 1939, Professor Tarzi completed his studies under the supervision of Professor Daniel Schlumberger, in the process obtaining the first of three Ph.D.s. From 1973 to 1979, he was Director General of Archaeology and Preservation of Historical Monuments of Afghanistan as well as the Director of the Archaeology Institute of Afghanistan. During those years he directed the excavations in Bamiyan and Hadda on the sites of Tape Shotor and Tape Tope Kalan.

Tarzi was exiled to France in 1979, where he assumed the post of Professor of Eastern Archaeology at the University of Strasbourg. He was Director for the French Archaeological Missions for the Surveys and Excavations of Bamiyan from 2003 - 2013. Dr. Tarzi starred in Christian Frei's documentary The Giant Buddhas about the Taliban's destruction of the Buddhas of Bamyan in March 2001.

Professor Tarzi was the author of over hundred articles and books, and served as president of the Association for the Protection of Afghan Archaeology (APAA), funded by his daughter Nadia Tarzi in 2002 and based in San Rafael, California.

== See also ==
- Archaeology of Afghanistan
