= Energy in Afghanistan =

The majority of electricity in Afghanistan is imported.

Energy in Afghanistan is provided by hydropower followed by fossil fuel and solar power. Currently, over 85% of Afghanistan's population has access to electricity. This covers the major cities in the country. Many rural areas do not have access to adequate electricity but this should change after more power stations are built and the major CASA-1000 project is completed.

Afghanistan generates around 600 megawatts (MW) of electricity from its several hydroelectric plants as well as by using fossil fuel and solar panels. Up to 800 MW more is imported from neighboring Iran, Tajikistan, Turkmenistan and Uzbekistan.

Due to the large influx of Afghan expats from Iran, Pakistan, Turkey and other countries, Afghanistan may require as much as 10,000 MW of electricity in the near future. The Afghan National Development Strategy has identified alternative energy, such as wind and solar energy, as a high value power source to develop. As a result, a number of solar and wind farms have been established, with more currently under development.

== Hydroelectricity ==
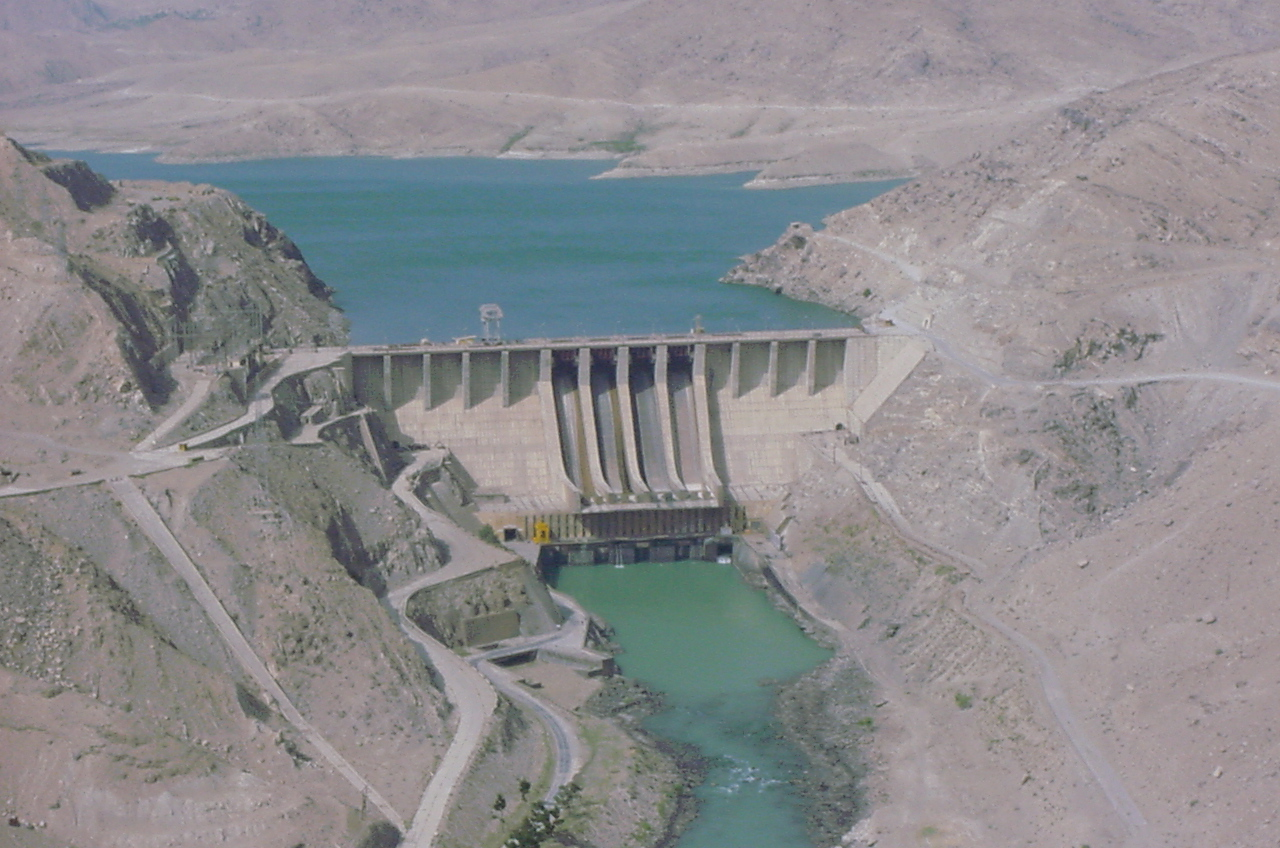
The Naghlu Dam is one of the largest dams in Afghanistan, which provides some electricity to Kabul Province, Nangarhar Province and Kapisa Province.

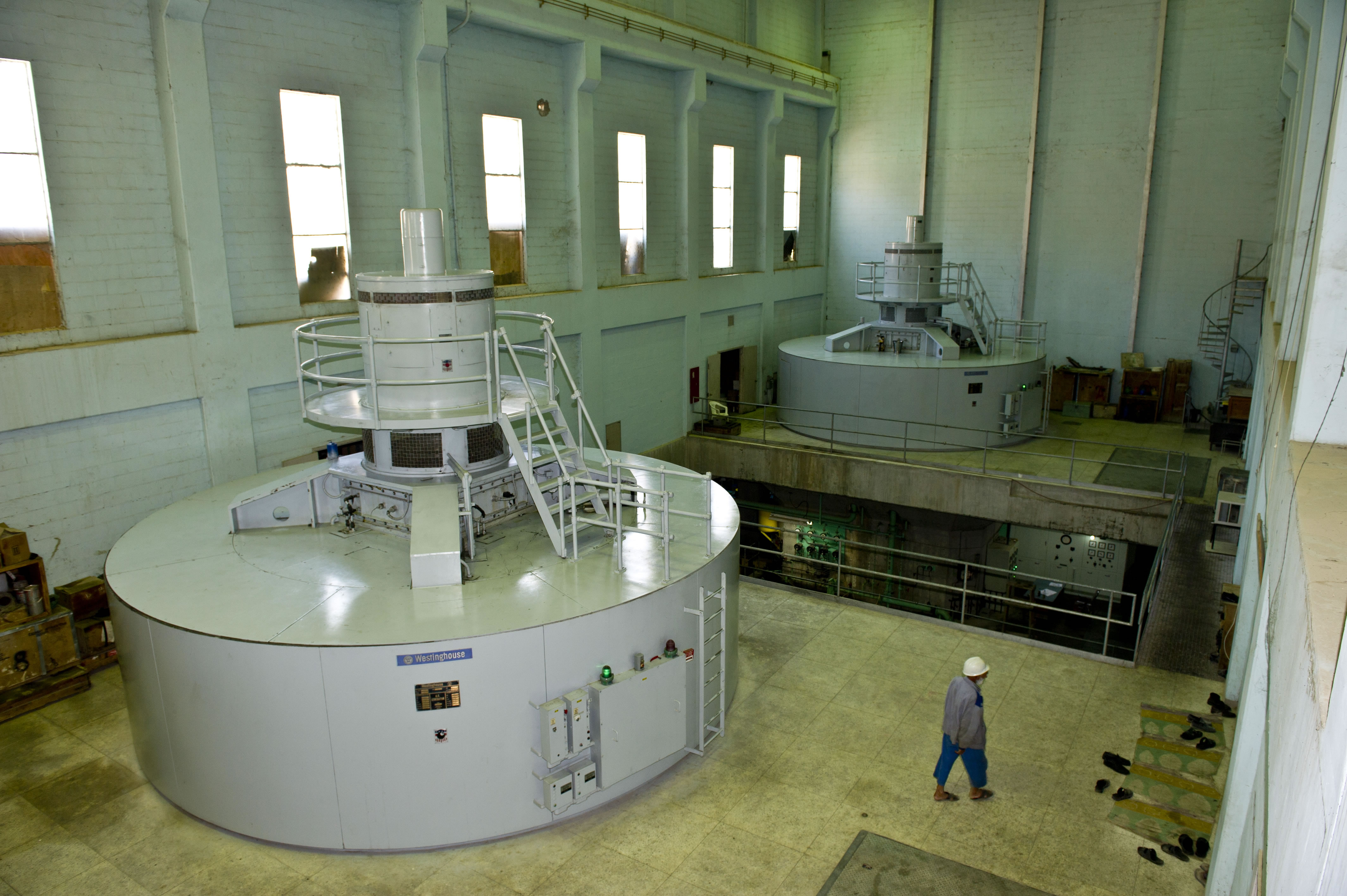
Inside the hydroelectric power station at the Kajaki Dam in the southern Helmand Province of Afghanistan

Afghanistan has the potential to produce over 23,000 MW of hydroelectricity. The government continues to seek technical assistance from neighboring and regional countries to build more dams. A number of dams with hydroelectric power stations were built between the 1950s and the mid-1970s, which included the Kajaki in the Kajaki District of Helmand Province and the Naghlu in the Sarobi District of Kabul Province. The Kajaki provides up to 151 MW of electricity to both Helmand and Kandahar provinces. The power station at the Kamal Khan Dam provides electricity to residents of Nimruz Province.

Residents of Kabul, Kapisa and Nangarhar provinces receive electricity from the Naghlu plant. Kunduz residents receive it from the local Nahr Gawkush power station. Residents of Badakhshan Province are connected to the Shorabak power plant in the Fayzabad District.

The power plant at the Salma Dam provides up to 42 MW of electricity to residents of Herat Province. A number of other water dams are being built in different parts of the country so that more residents have access to basic electricity.

Residents of small cities or towns in the central provinces continue to build small dams for water storage and production of electricity. Recently some Chinese firms found interest in assisting Afghans with these projects.

== Imported electricity ==
Afghanistan currently imports about 800 MW of electricity from neighboring Iran, Tajikistan, Turkmenistan and Uzbekistan. This costs the country between $250 and $280 million annually.

=== Iran ===
Afghanistan's western provinces have long purchased electricity from eastern Iran.

=== Tajikistan ===
Afghanistan purchases as much as 150 MW of electricity from Tajikistan. After completion, the CASA-1000 mega project will provide an additional 300 MW of electricity to Afghanistan, with the remaining 1,000 MW going to Pakistan.

=== Turkmenistan ===
Afghanistan continues to purchase electricity from Turkmenistan. The electricity is supplied to as far as Herat province in the west, and Kabul province in the east.

=== Uzbekistan ===
Afghanistan purchases as much as 450 MW of electricity from Uzbekistan. This is expected to be increased up to 1,000 MW in the near future. Discussions on electricity supplies began in 2006, and then the construction of a 442 km (275 mi) high voltage transmission line from Uzbekistan to Afghanistan was completed in 2008. It runs from Kabul through five Afghan provinces towards the country's border with Uzbekistan, and connects to the Uzbek electricity transmission system. By 2009 residents of Kabul were enjoying 24-hour electricity.

== Crude oil, natural gas, and coal ==
Afghanistan imports petroleum products and natural gas from neighboring Iran, Turkmenistan and Uzbekistan. It also receive them from Kazakhstan, Kyrgyzstan, and Russia. Azerbaijan may soon re-join this exporter list. Meanwhile, work on the Turkmenistan–Afghanistan–Pakistan–India Pipeline of natural gas is ongoing.

Afghanistan has its own oil fields in the northern provinces of Sar-e Pol, Jowzjan and Faryab. These fields contain an estimated 1.9 billion barrels of crude oil and approximately 15 billion cubic feet of natural gas. Some of the oil and gas is used to produce electricity locally.

Bayat Power, which was established in 2016, has played a crucial role in enhancing Afghanistan's electricity production using domestic natural gas. Its facility in Sheberghan, Jowzjan Province—operational since November 2019—is the first modern natural gas power plant in the country in over four decades. The plant, powered by an advanced SGT-A45 gas turbine developed with Siemens Energy, produces reliable electricity for hundreds thousands of customers. By 2024, Bayat Power had generated over 1 billion kWh of electricity, contributing to energy security and reducing reliance on imports.

Although China has agreed to provide technical assistance for coal-powered plants, there are no solid commitments due to a lack of infrastructure and the global shift away from coal as a legacy power source. This observation was reported by Ariana News. Many buildings in Afghanistan, especially in Kabul province, use coal-powered central heating systems similar to that used in Uzbekistan. They keep the buildings very comfortable and warm during the winter but are much more expensive than electric-powered heating systems.

=== 2026 Saudi energy deal ===
In September 2026, Afghanistan's Ministry of Mines and Petroleum signed a deal with Saudi Arabia's Delta International Energy for the exploration and extraction of hydrocarbons from the Kushk-Tirpul basin in the western part of the country and the construction of a gas pipeline network from the Guzara district in Herat to Spin Boldak in Kandahar. The pipeline was planned to be 700-km long, with the whole project valued by the ministry at $200 million. The exploration phase was set to last eight years, while the contract was signed for a period of 25 years.

== Solar and wind farms ==
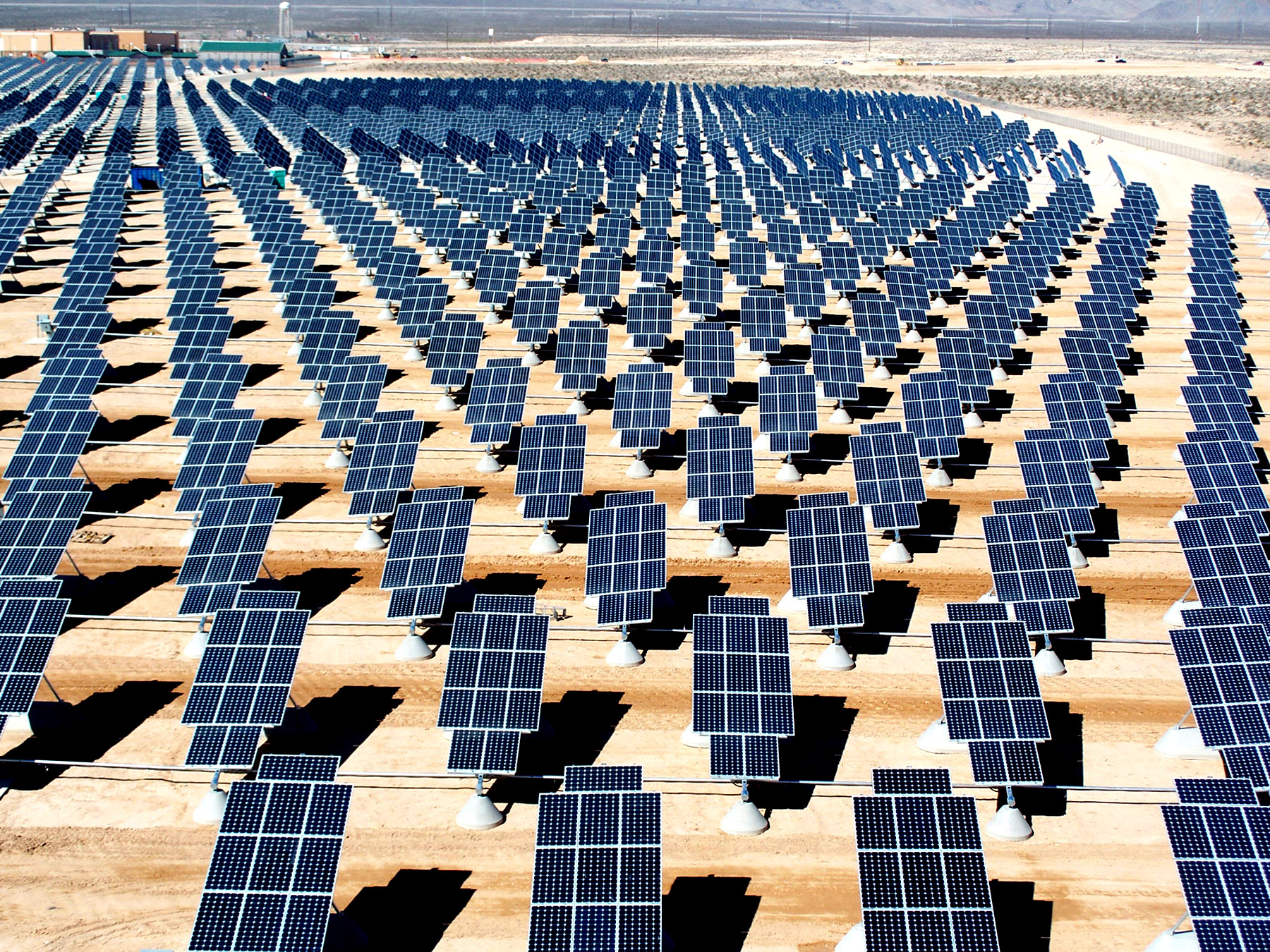
So far, Afghanistan's New Energy Administration has commissioned 72 solar projects worth $345 million.

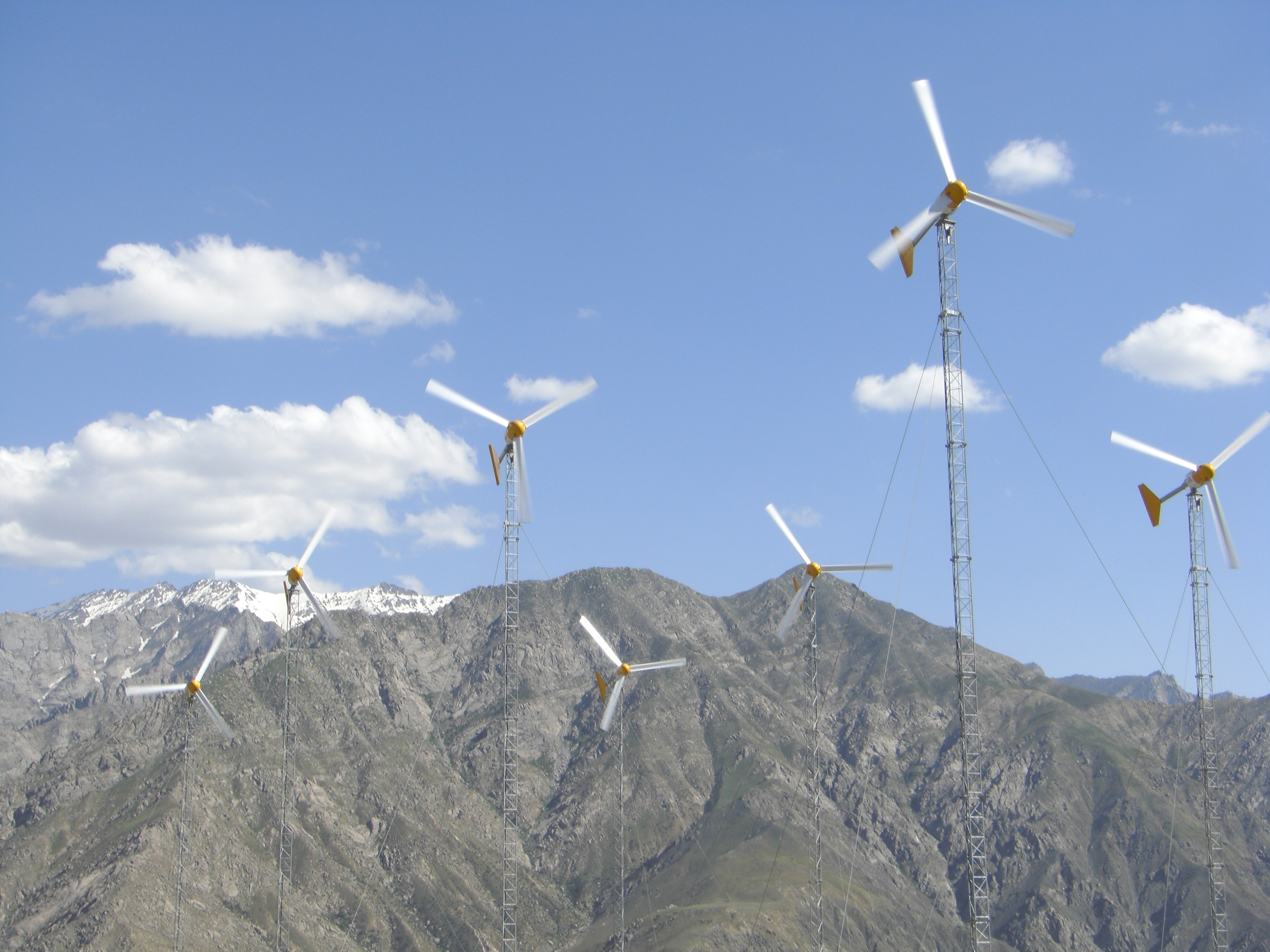
Afghanistan's first wind farm in the Panjshir Province

Afghanistan has the potential to produce over 222,000 MW of electricity by using solar panels. The use of solar power has become popular in the last decade, with solar farms being established in a number of cities. Solar-powered street lights are seen in all Afghan cities and towns. Many villagers in rural parts of the country are also buying solar panels and using them.

The country also has the potential to produce over 66,000 MW of electricity by installing and using wind turbines. The first wind farm was successfully completed in Panjshir Province in 2008. More began to be built in Herat province. The United States Agency for International Development (USAID) had teamed up with the National Renewable Energy Laboratory to develop a wind map of Herat province. They have identified approximately 158,000 MW of potential wind power. Installing wind turbine farms in Herat could provide electricity to most of western Afghanistan. Smaller projects are wind pumps that already have been attached to water wells in several Herat villages, along with reservoirs for storing up to 15 cubic meters of water. The first 300 KW wind farm in Herat was inaugurated in September 2017.

== Biomass and biogas ==
Besides wind and sun, potential alternative energy sources for Afghanistan include biomass, biogas, and geothermal energy. Biogas plants are fueled by animal dung, and produce a clean, odourless and smokeless fuel. The digestion process also creates a high-quality fertilizer which can benefit the family farm.

Family-sized biogas plants require 50 kilograms of manure per day to support the average family. Four to six cows are required to produce this amount of manure, or eight to nine camels, or 50 sheep/goats. Theoretically, Afghanistan has the potential to produce about 1,400 million cubic meters of biogas annually. A quarter of this amount could meet half of Afghanistan's energy needs, according to a January 2011 report from the United States National Renewable Energy Laboratory.

== Lithium and uranium ==
Afghanistan has large amounts of lithium and uranium reserves.

== Geothermal ==
An area of vast untapped potential lies in the heat energy locked inside the earth in the form of magma or dry, hot rocks. Geothermal energy for electricity generation has been used worldwide for nearly 100 years. The technology currently exists to provide low-cost electricity from Afghanistan's geothermal resources, which are located in the main axis areas of the Hindu Kush. These run along the Herat fault system, all the way from Herat to the Wakhan District of Badakhshan Province in Afghanistan.

With efficient use of the natural resources already abundantly available in Afghanistan, alternative energy sources could be directed into industrial use, supply the energy needs of the nation and build economic self-sufficiency.

== See also ==
- List of power stations in Afghanistan
- Renewable energy in Afghanistan
