= Afrij =

Village in Badakhshan Province, Afghanistan

Coordinates: 37°01′15″N 71°01′40″E

Afrij (also spelled Yafrij or یافریح) is a village located in the Shuhada District of Badakhshan Province, Afghanistan. Previously, it was part of the Baharak District before administrative boundaries were redefined. The village is situated in the northeastern part of the country, characterized by its mountainous terrain and rich cultural heritage.

The economy of Afrij, like many villages in Badakhshan, is primarily based on agriculture and livestock rearing. The villagers engage in farming, cultivating crops suited to the mountainous terrain, and raising animals, which are integral to their livelihood. The community maintains a traditional lifestyle, with cultural practices and social structures reflecting the heritage of the region.

Access to Afrij is influenced by the province's rugged landscape. While Fayzabad, the provincial capital, is connected by air through Fayzabad Airport, reaching Afrij requires traversing mountainous roads that can be challenging, especially during adverse weather conditions. Efforts have been made to improve infrastructure, but accessibility remains a significant aspect of daily life in the village.

The village of Afrij contributes to the rich cultural mosaic of Badakhshan Province of northeastern Afghanistan.

Afrij is also short for Arid Forest Research Institute
