= Bayat Power =

Independent power producer in Afghanistan

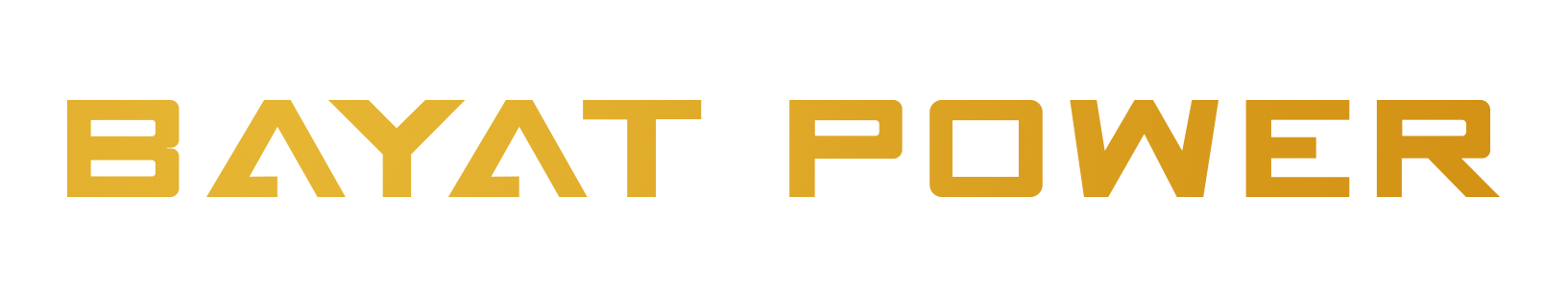
- Company type: Electricity services distributor
- Industry: Energy
- Founded: 2016
- Founder: Ehsan Bayat
- Headquarters: Kabul, Afghanistan
- Website: www.bayatpower.com

Bayat Power is an independent power producer in Afghanistan. Established in 2016 as part of the Bayat Group, the company developed and operates a natural gas-based power plant to address Afghanistan’s energy needs.

== Overview ==
Bayat Power is a subsidiary of the Bayat Group, founded by Dr. Ehsanollah Bayat in 2002. The group operates in multiple sectors in Afghanistan, including telecommunications (Afghan Wireless), media (Ariana Radio & Television Network), energy, internet service Provider (Ariana Network Services) and non-profit initiatives (Bayat Foundation). Bayat Power’s operations are based in Sheberghan, a region known for its natural gas reserves. The company works to reduce Afghanistan's reliance on imported electricity and supports local energy production.

=== Bayat Power-1 ===
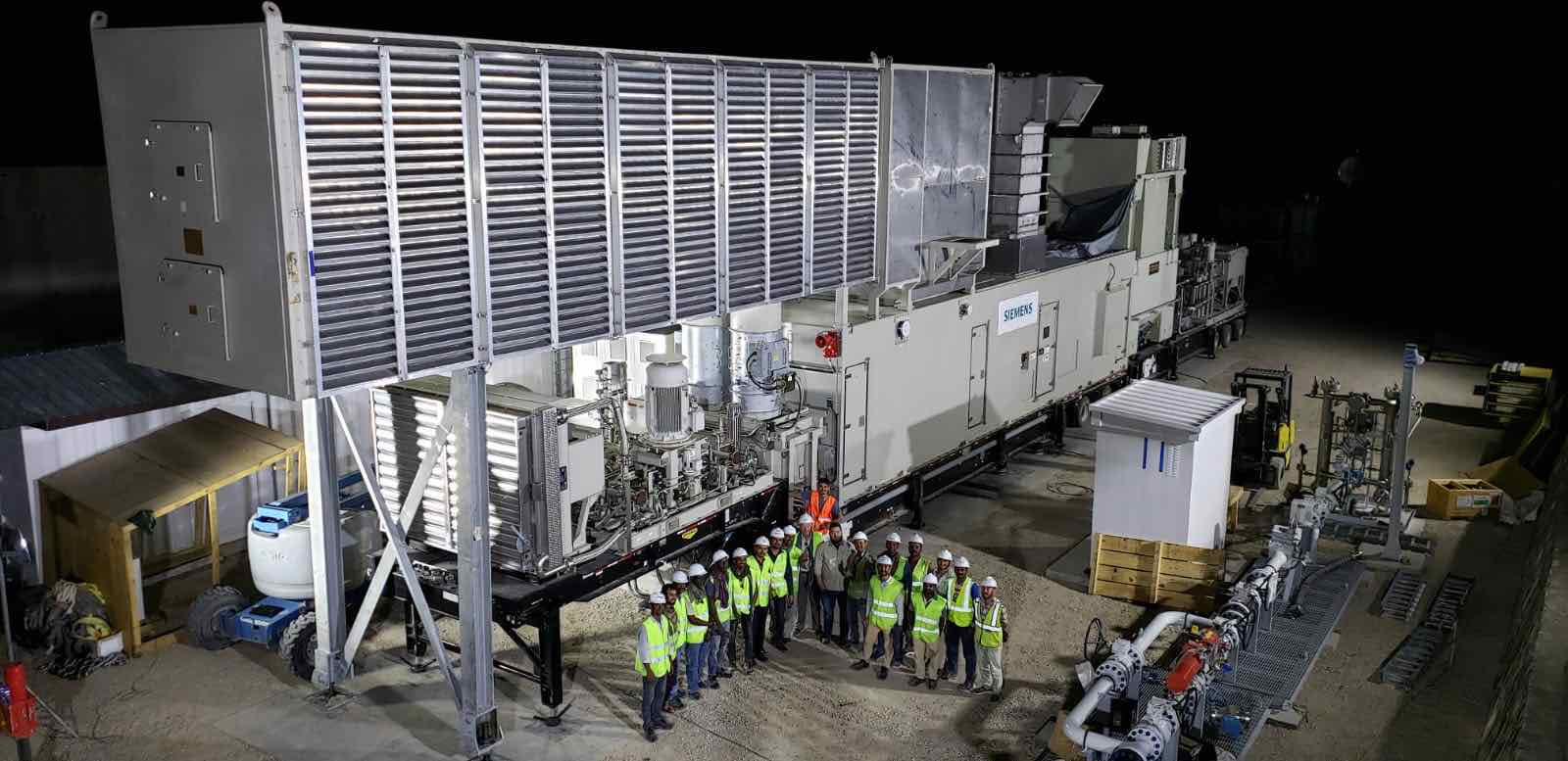
Bayat Power facility in Sheberghan, Jowzjan Province

Bayat Power-1, the company’s first gas-fired power plant, began operations in November 2019. It is the first modern gas-to-electricity generation facility in Afghanistan in over four decades. The plant produces up to 44 MW of electricity, supplying power to thousands of Afghan households. The plant employs a Siemens SGT-A45 turbine for rapid deployment and operational efficiency. It generates approximately 300 million kWh annually. It operates in collaboration with Da Afghanistan Breshna Sherkat (DABS) and the Ministry of Mines and Petroleum.

== Achievements ==
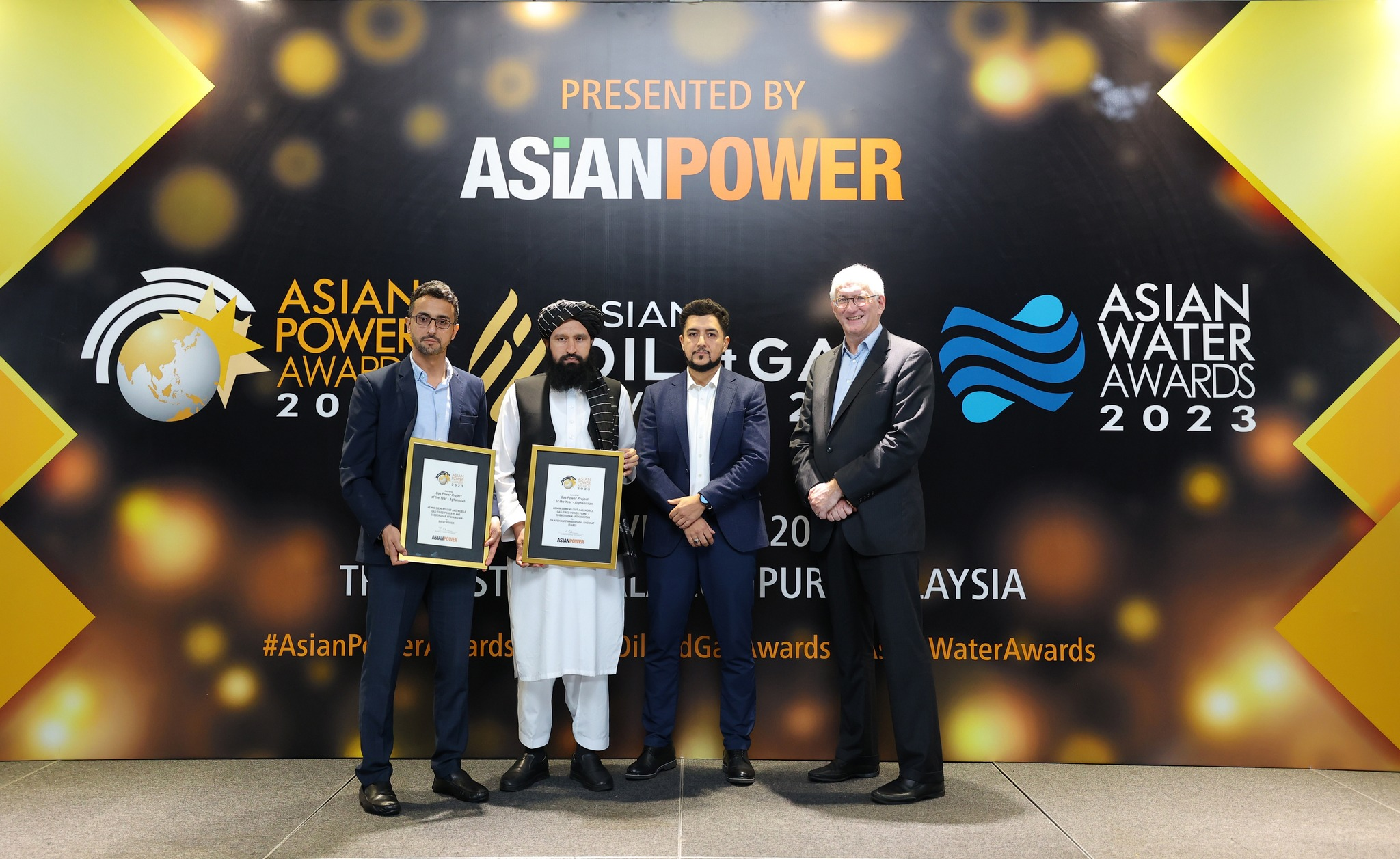
Bayat Power receiving the Asian Power Award 2023

Bayat Power has produced more than 1 billion kWh of electricity since its launch. In 2023, the company was recognized by the Asian Power Awards.

== Partnerships ==
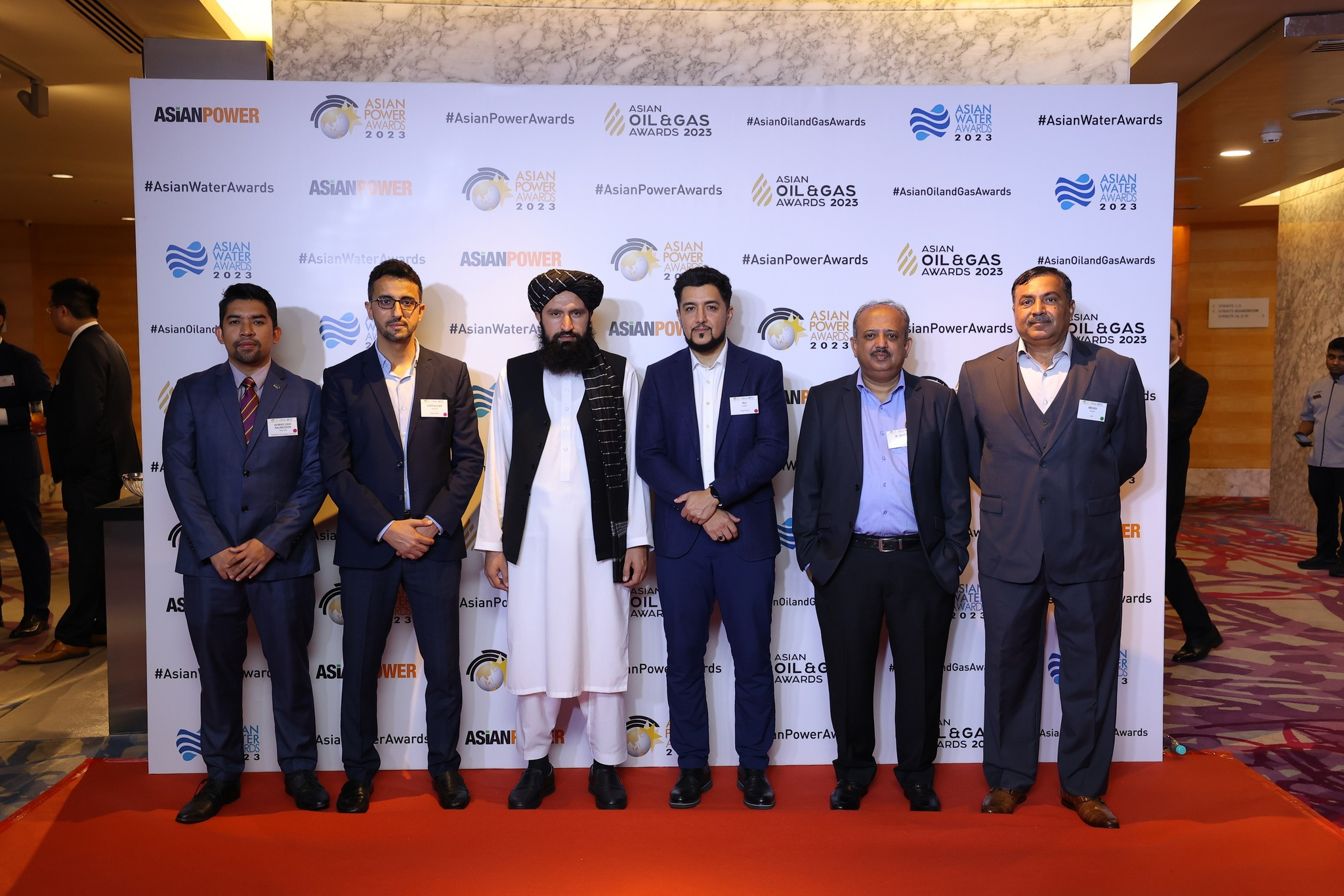
Bayat Power receiving the Asian Power Award 2023

Bayat Power collaborates with international companies including Siemens Energy, Relevant Power Solutions and Afghan government entities. It is a member of the Afghanistan Chamber of Commerce and Investment (ACCI) and the Afghanistan Renewable Energy Union (AREU).

== Social and economic impact ==
The company's operations have supported job creation and skills/workforce development in Afghanistan's energy sector, providing training for Afghan engineers and technical specialists.

== Future plans ==
Bayat Power plans to expand its generating capacity to reach a target of 200 MW of electricity. It is also exploring renewable energy solutions and off-grid technologies.

== See also ==
- Energy in Afghanistan
- Renewable energy in Afghanistan
