= List of power stations in Afghanistan =

This article lists power stations in Afghanistan.

== Hydroelectric ==
Station	Province	Coordinates	Capacity (MW)	Commissioned	Refs
Asadabad	Kunar		0.7	1983	
Chak	Maidan Wardak		3.3	1938	
Darunta	Nangarhar		11.2	1964	
Grishk	Helmand		2.4	1945	
Istalif	Kabul		0.2	2006	
Kajaki	Helmand		151	1975	
Kamal Khan	Nimruz		6	2021	
Mahipar	Kabul		66	1967	
Naghlu	Kabul		100	1967	
Paranda	Panjshir		4	2025	
Pashdan	Herat		2	2025	
Puli Khumri	Baghlan		4.8	1960	
Salma	Herat		42	2016	
Shah wa Arus	Kabul		1.2	2024	
Shorabak	Badakhshan		7.5	2021	
Sokhtak	Daikundi		0.7	2021	
Surobi	Kabul		22	1957	

== Gas ==
Station	Province	Coordinates	Capacity (MW)	Commissioned	Ref
Mazar-i-Sharif	Balkh		50	Planned, 2016	
Northwest Kabul	Kabul		42	1983	
Bayat Power	Jowzjan		200	2019	

== Oil ==
Station	Province	Coordinates	Capacity (MW)	Commissioned	Ref
Tarakhil Power Plant	Kabul		105	2010	

== Solar ==
Station	Province	Coordinates	Capacity (MW)	Commissioned	Ref
Bamyan	Bamyan		1	2012	
Daman	Kandahar		10	2019	
Daman	Kandahar		30	2020	
Dur Baba	Nangarhar		200	2019	
Kabul	Kabul		0.03	2018	
Kabul	Kabul		20	2021	
Herat	Herat		1.7	2017	
Khost	Khost		10	2019	
Surobi	Kabul		10	2024	
Surobi	Kabul		22.75	2025	

== Wind ==
Station	Province	Coordinates	Capacity (KW)	Commissioned	Ref
Herat	Herat		300	2017	
Panjshir Valley	Panjshir		75	2008	

== See also ==
- Energy in Afghanistan
- List of dams and reservoirs in Afghanistan
- Lists of power stations
- List of largest power stations
