= Badakhshan (disambiguation) =

Badakhshan is a historic region comprising parts of what is now northeastern Afghanistan, eastern Tajikistan, and the Tashkurgan county in China.

Badakhshan may also refer to:

- Badakhshan Province, Afghanistan
  - Badakhshan University
- Gorno-Badakhshan Autonomous Region, Tajikistan

== See also ==
- Badakhshani (disambiguation)
