= Faiza Darkhani =

Afghan environmentalist and women's rights activist

- Born: c. 1992; Afghanistan
- Education: Badakhshan University, University of Putra Malaysia
- Occupations: Environmentalist, women's rights activist, educator
- Awards: 100 Women (BBC) (2021)

Standing out from the crowd is a courageous decision. You must follow your dreams and turn them into realities, and my dream is having a clean and safe environment, free of war and all types of pollution.

— Faiza Darkhani

Faiza Darkhani (born c. 1992) is an Afghan environmentalist, women's rights advocate, and educator. In 2021, she was part of the 100 Women BBC list, which includes the most inspiring and influential women in the world. Darkhani is one of the few scholars of climate change within Afghanistan. She was formerly the director of the National Environmental Protection Agency in Badakhshan province.

She attended the Badakhshan University, followed by study at University of Putra Malaysia (also known as Universiti Putra Malaysia) where she graduated with a master of science degree in landscape architecture. Her research focuses on the sustainable management of urban landscapes and the relationship between urban agriculture and food security.

From 2022 to 2024, she was an Alexander von Humboldt Foundation scholarship holder and worked at the Leibniz Centre for Agricultural Landscape Research (ZALF) e.V. in Germany. She conducted and published research on the role of women in alternative food networks. Her work was also cited in the fourth German Gender Equality Report, published in 2025 by the Federal Ministry for Education, Family Affairs, Senior Citizens, Women and Youth.

In 2024, Darkhani moved to Vancouver, Canada and started working as a doctoral student at the University of British Columbia Faculty of Forestry & Environmental Stewardship. Her advisor is Sarah E. Gergel.

== See also ==
- List of women climate scientists and activists
