= Telephone Systems International =

US international telecommunications company

- Industry: Telecommunications
- Founded: 1998; 27 years ago
- Founder: Ehsan Bayat

Telephone Systems International is a U.S.-based provider of international telecommunications services founded by Afghan-American entrepreneur Ehsan Bayat. TSI operates the Afghan Wireless Communication Company in a joint venture with the Afghan Ministry of Communications.

== History ==
In 1998, Telephone Systems International (TSI) was formed with the goal of building a commercial telephone network in Afghanistan.
