= Shorabak Dam =

Dam in Badakhshan Province of Afghanistan

- Location within Afghanistan
- Country: Afghanistan
- Location: Fayzabad District, Badakhshan Province
- Coordinates: 37°03′55″N 70°35′57″E
- Purpose: Irrigation and electricity
- Status: Operational
- Construction began: 2014
- Opening date: June 25, 2021
- Construction cost: $48 million USD
- Owner: Ministry of Energy and Water

Dam and spillways
- Type of dam: Gravity
- Impounds: Kokcha River
- Elevation at crest: 1,227 m (4,026 ft)

The Shorabak Dam, also known as Shorabak hydroelectric power plant, and referred to as Band-e Shorabak in Dari, is located on the Kokcha River about 10 km (6.2 mi) southeast of Fayzabad, Afghanistan, in the Fayzabad District of Badakhshan Province. It is a gravity dam with a power station that produces up to 7.5 megawatts of electricity.

== See also ==
- List of dams and reservoirs in Afghanistan
- List of power stations in Afghanistan
