= Tagab District, Badakhshan =

Coordinates: 36°28′20″N 70°19′54″E

Tagab تگاب
- District
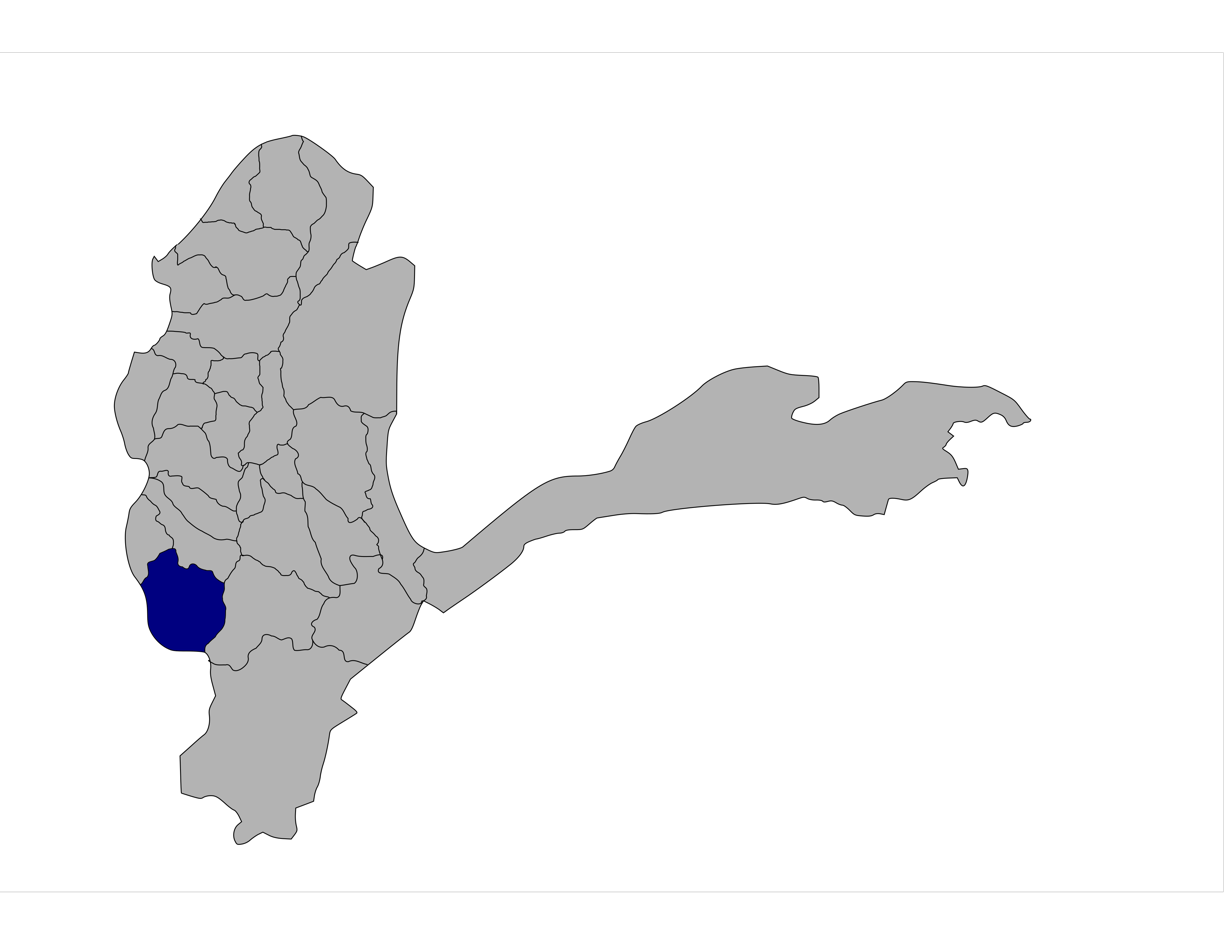
- Tagab District was formed within Fayzabad District
- Country: Afghanistan
- Province: Badakhshan

Government
  - Type: District council

Population
  - Estimate (2019): 31,753

Tagab (Dari: تگاب) is one of the 29 districts of Badakhshan province in Afghanistan. It was created in 2005 from part of Fayzabad District and has a population of approximately 31,753 [2020] residents. The Karaste Canal is located in Tagab District.

== See also ==
- Fayzabad district
