= Renewable energy in Afghanistan =

Electricity supply in Afghanistan by source

Renewable energy in Afghanistan includes biomass, geothermal, hydropower, solar, and wind power. Afghanistan is a landlocked country surrounded by five other countries. With a population of less than 35 million people, it is one of the lowest energy consuming countries in relation to a global standing. It holds a spot as one of the countries with a smaller ecological footprint. Hydropower is currently the main source of renewable energy due to Afghanistan's geographical location. Its large mountainous environment facilitates the siting of hydroelectric dams (see also list of dams and reservoirs in Afghanistan) and other facets of hydro energy.

The renewable energy resource potential of Afghanistan is estimated at over 300,000 MW according to the state's Ministry of Energy and Water. The country currently spends around $280 million on importing 670 MW of electricity from neighboring Iran, Uzbekistan, Tajikistan and Turkmenistan.

Another form of renewable energy in Afghanistan is biogas. With the start of biogas, communities have begun to feel the benefits beyond that of the environment through capacity building as well.

== Biomass energy ==
Afghanistan has the potential to produce about 4,000 MW of power through biomass. Traditional biomass energy has supplied up to 90% of energy demand, such as from firewood and dung.

=== Biogas ===
Biogas can be used in many different countries with the same function and uses. The renewable energy sector in Afghanistan is growing today through biogas. The "use of biogas produced from anaerobic decomposition of organic material. This biogas typically contains equal amounts of CH_{4} and CO_{2.}" When biogas is converted in the right way, that is when the renewable energy and resource is possible deriving the hydrogen from the waste. Biogas "decompose municipal solid wastes anaerobically and landfill gas to energy projects that directly combust the landfill gas are being implemented." The strength of biogas is incredible, it has been proven that the "biogas energy corridor can work as a good substitute for nearly 70% of the country's population residing in rural areas. Installation of plants to bottle the biogas can be additional opportunity. The need of a national policy is imperative to bring this technology at farmer's doorstep." The renewable energy that this brings is very strong through reducing the carbon footprint of each community immeasurably. The system of biogas also creates immense potential for capacity building through the community connectedness that goes into the process. The teamwork is inevitable that comes from this initiative which begins with an exchange of knowledge, both shared and new. Then capacity building can begin to form contributing to resources and market development growing rapidly. Advocacy for all parties is the only way for effective participatory renewable energy to be made. The United Nations Environment Program (UNEP) spoke on the topic when the Country Program Manager of Afghanistan said,

UNEP is pleased to endorse the vision and mission of the Biogas Consortium Afghanistan. The majority of the population of Afghanistan uses firewood and coal for their cooking and heating needs; more sustainable energy options are required. […] UNEP has committed to providing higher-level guidance, helping the consortium align its activities towards national policies and strategies. UNEP shall also advocate the benefits and studies that arise from the consortiums work in biogas in Afghanistan.

== Geothermal ==
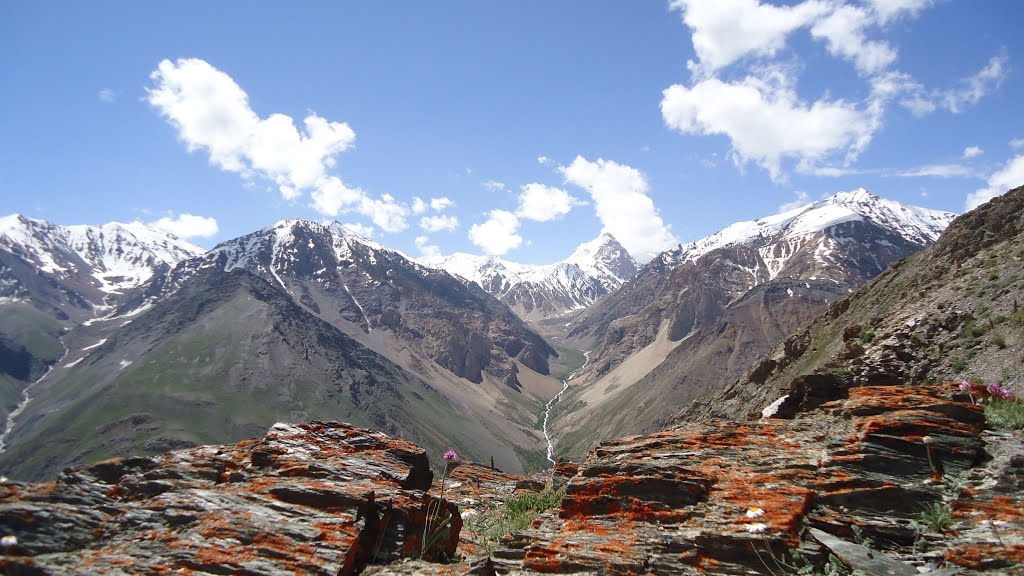
The Wakhan District of Badakhshan Province in the far northeast of the country

An area of vast untapped potential lies in the heat energy locked inside the earth in the form of magma or dry, hot rocks. Geothermal energy for electricity generation has been used worldwide for nearly 100 years. The technology currently exists to provide low-cost electricity from Afghanistan's geothermal resources, which are located in the main axis areas of the Hindu Kush. These run along the Herat fault system, all the way from Herat in the west to the Wakhan District of Badakhshan Province in the far northeast.

With efficient use of the natural resources already abundantly available in Afghanistan, alternative energy sources could be directed into industrial use, supply the energy needs of the nation and build economic self-sufficiency.

== Hydropower ==
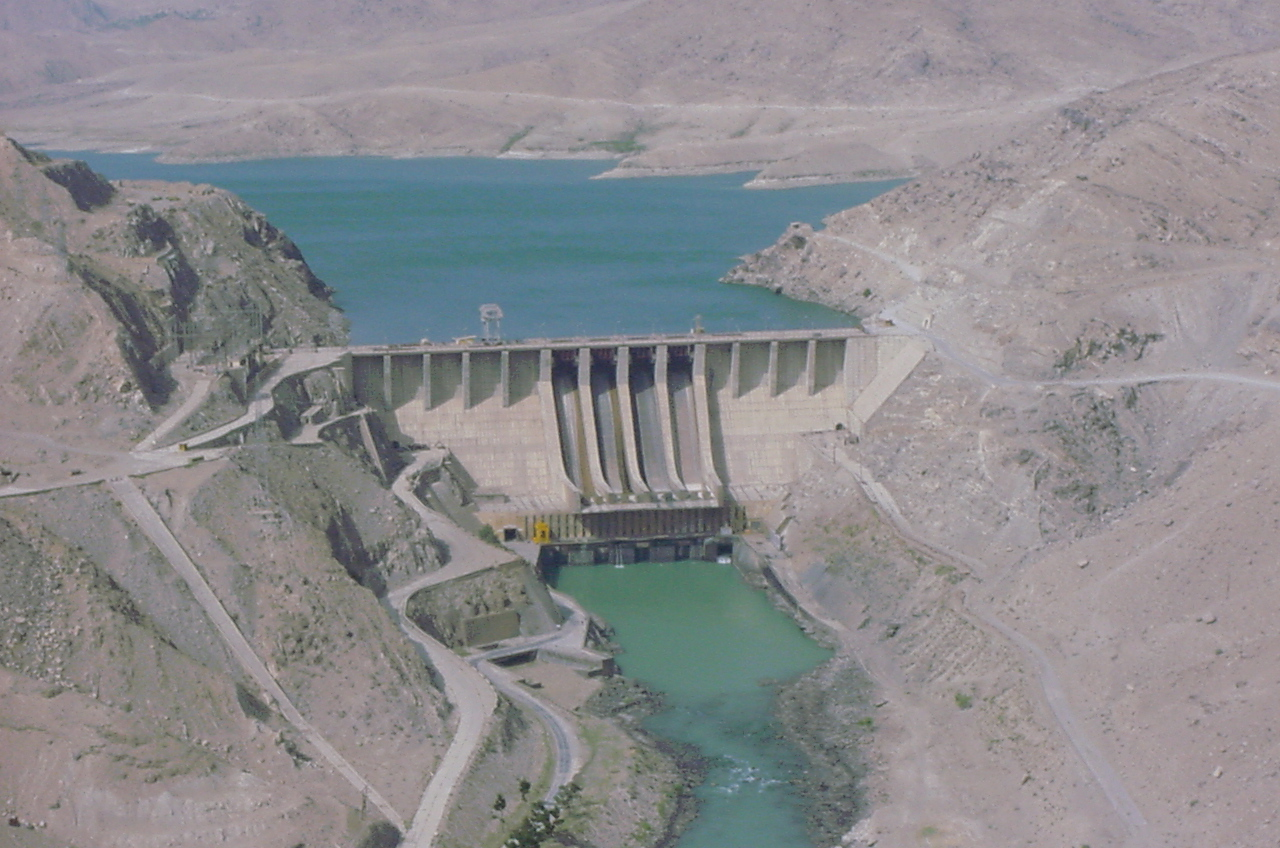
The Naghlu Dam in Kabul Province, which is the largest dam in Afghanistan, has the capacity to produce 100 megawatts (MW) of electricity.

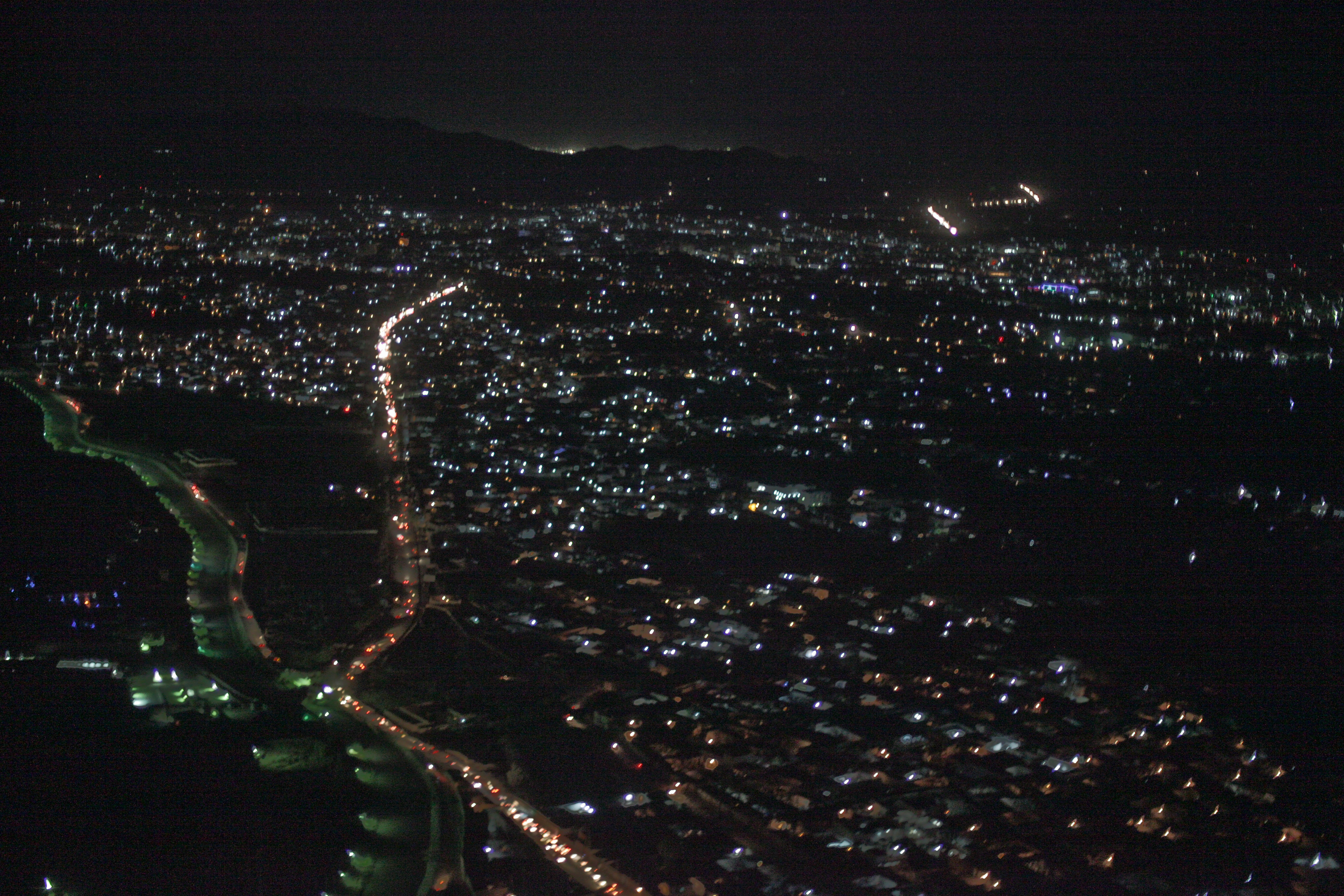
Aerial photography of Kandahar at night in 2011. Its electricity is provided mainly by two sources, the Kajaki hydroelectric power station in neighboring Helmand Province and solar farms on the outskirts of the city.

Hydropower and hydro-energy are some of the best energy options in the country. The geographical location of Afghanistan is extremely mountainous which makes the implementation of hydropower an easier choice.

The current system in place though it works well, is not without its flaws. As Yasah et al. contend, "the common strategy is currently to build micro-hydropower facilities to power single bulbs and maybe a water boiler for the whole community. Such constructions will not deliver sufficient power for electric ovens etc., grid electricity will not stretch out to the rural areas of Afghanistan in the near decades."

Acknowledging how low Afghanistan's ecological footprint is in terms of its energy consumption, it is not a current possibility to have enough energy. In fact, "the country has 75 billion cubic meters of potentially available renewable water resources are also the main source of recharge for groundwater as precipitation is low in Afghanistan." Water has become such a precious commodity across the globe that makes having an abundance of it, as a natural resource is a fortunate reality for Afghanistan. That being said it is also contended that even though these ideas and proposals for hydro energy would work and have positive effects, the necessary work that is a project such as hydro energy.

=== Hydropower resources ===
Afghanistan has the potential to produce over 23,000 MW of hydroelectricity.

The country has significant hydro resources with the river catchment area of 677,900 km^{2}, annual average rainfall of 300 mm and widespread hilly topography.

== Solar power ==
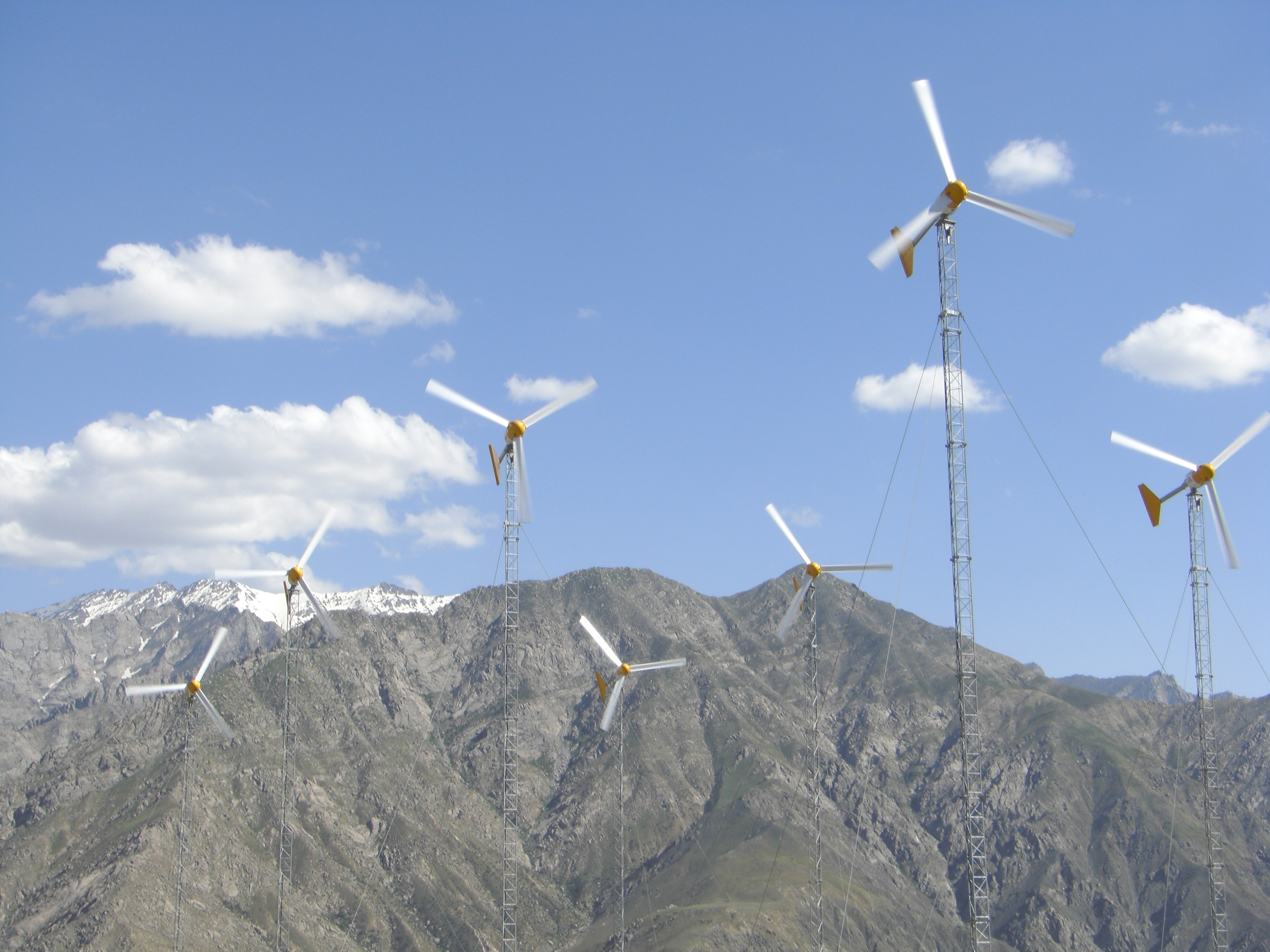
A wind farm in Panjshir Province

Afghanistan has the potential to produce over 222,000 MW of electricity by using solar panels. The use of solar power is steadily increasing throughout country. Annual average solar insolation varies from 4 to 6.5 kWh/m^{2}/day, with over 300 days of sunshine per year.

== Wind power ==
The report also stated that Afghanistan has the potential to produce around 68,000 MW of electricity by installing and using wind turbines. Wind power is not the commonly used method in Afghanistan for renewable energy though there are vast opportunities. It is believed that the areas which would produce the most wind energy and would benefit the most are in western Afghanistan, and some areas in the north as well.

== See also ==
- Energy in Afghanistan
- Renewable energy by country
- Renewable energy in Asia
- Bayat Power
