= Grishk Dam =

Coordinates: 31°49′35″N 64°35′29″E

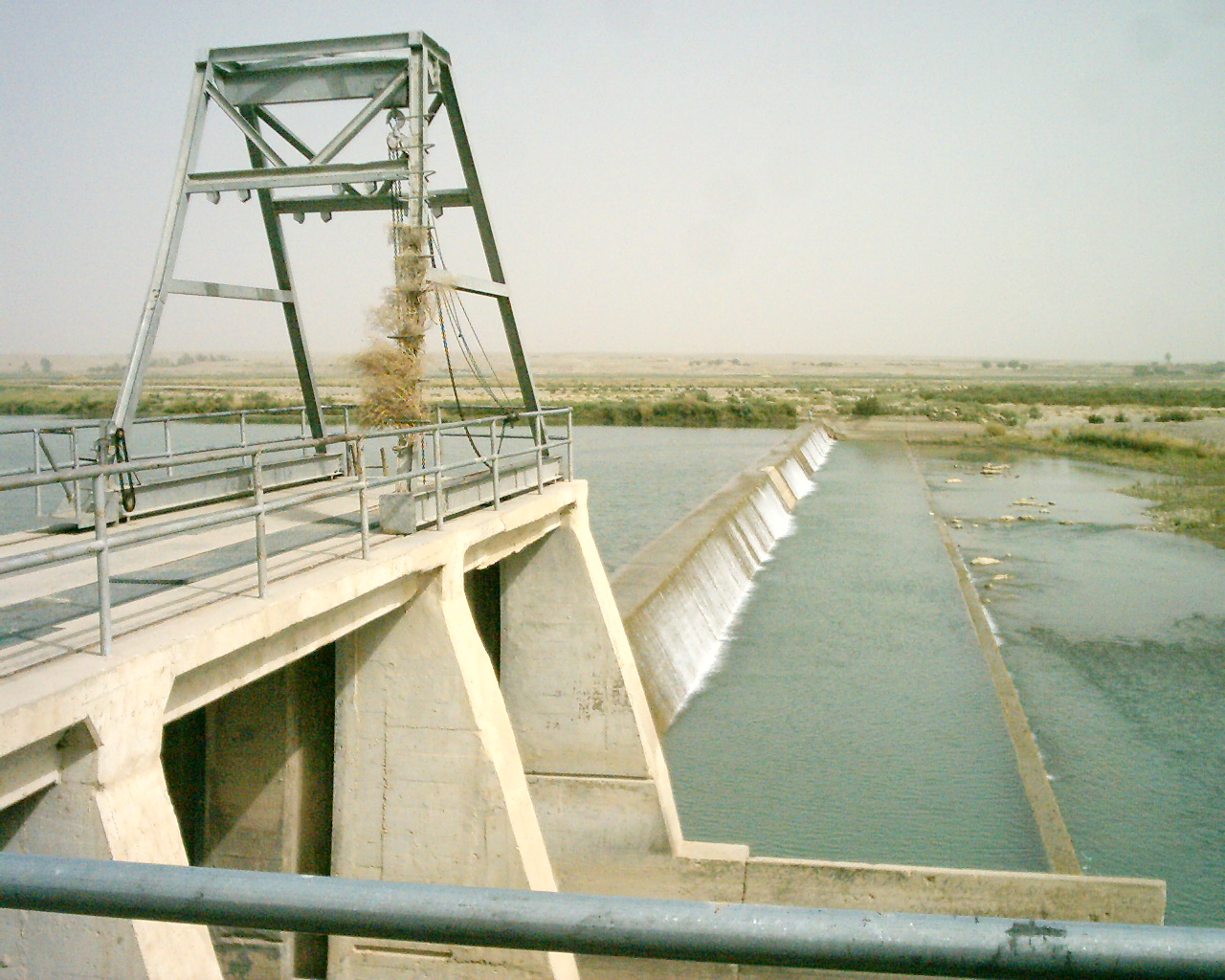
- View of the Canal Intake Structure in 2003, which is about 2.7 mi (4.3 km) northeast of Grishk Dam on the Helmand River

- Location within Afghanistan
- Location: Grishk, Helmand Province, Afghanistan
- Opening date: 1945

Dam and spillways
- Impounds: Helmand River
- Length: 67 m (220 ft)
- Width (base): 60 m (200 ft)

The Grishk Dam is located on a canal next to the city of Grishk in the Helmand Province of Afghanistan. It is a gravity dam with a hydroelectric power plant. About 2.7 mi (4.3 km) to the northeast is the Canal Intake Structure, which provides water from the Helmand River to Grishk Dam.

A 2003 technical journal noted, that the Grishk power plant was commissioned on an irrigation canal in 1945, and had two damaged and obsolete 1.2 megawatt units which would cost US$3 million to repair.

== See also ==
- List of dams and reservoirs in Afghanistan
- Tourism in Afghanistan
