= Badakhshani =

Badakhshani or Badakhshi may refer to:

- Badakhshan, the historic region situated in northeastern Afghanistan and eastern Tajikistan
- Badakhshan Province, a province in Afghanistan
- Gorno-Badakhshan Autonomous Province, an autonomous region in Tajikistan
- Lali Badakhshan, a political party in Tajikistan
- Music of Badakhshan
- Mullah Shah Badakhshi, a Sufi spiritual leader
- Pamiri people, a population from Gorno-Badakhshan, Tajikistan also called Badakhshanis

== See also ==
- Badakhshan (disambiguation)
