= Sokhtak Dam =

Dam in Daykundi Province of Afghanistan

- Location within Afghanistan
- Country: Afghanistan
- Location: Nili District, Daykundi Province
- Coordinates: 33°45′03″N 66°11′58″E
- Purpose: Irrigation and electricity
- Status: Operational
- Construction began: 2014
- Opening date: 2020
- Construction cost: $4.9 million
- Owner: Ministry of Energy and Water

Dam and spillways
- Type of dam: Gravity
- Length: 107 m (351 ft)

The Sokhtak Dam, sometimes written as Sokhtook Dam or Sukhtook Dam, is located east of Nili, which is the capital city of Daykundi Province in central Afghanistan. It is a gravity dam, approximately 107 m (351 ft) long with two spillways and a hydroelectric power station. The dam was built by the Ministry of Energy and Water at a cost of nearly five million US dollars.

== See also ==
- List of dams and reservoirs in Afghanistan
- List of power stations in Afghanistan
- List of rivers of Afghanistan
- Tourism in Afghanistan
