= Fayzabad, Badakhshan =

Fayzabad فيض آباد
- Provincial capital
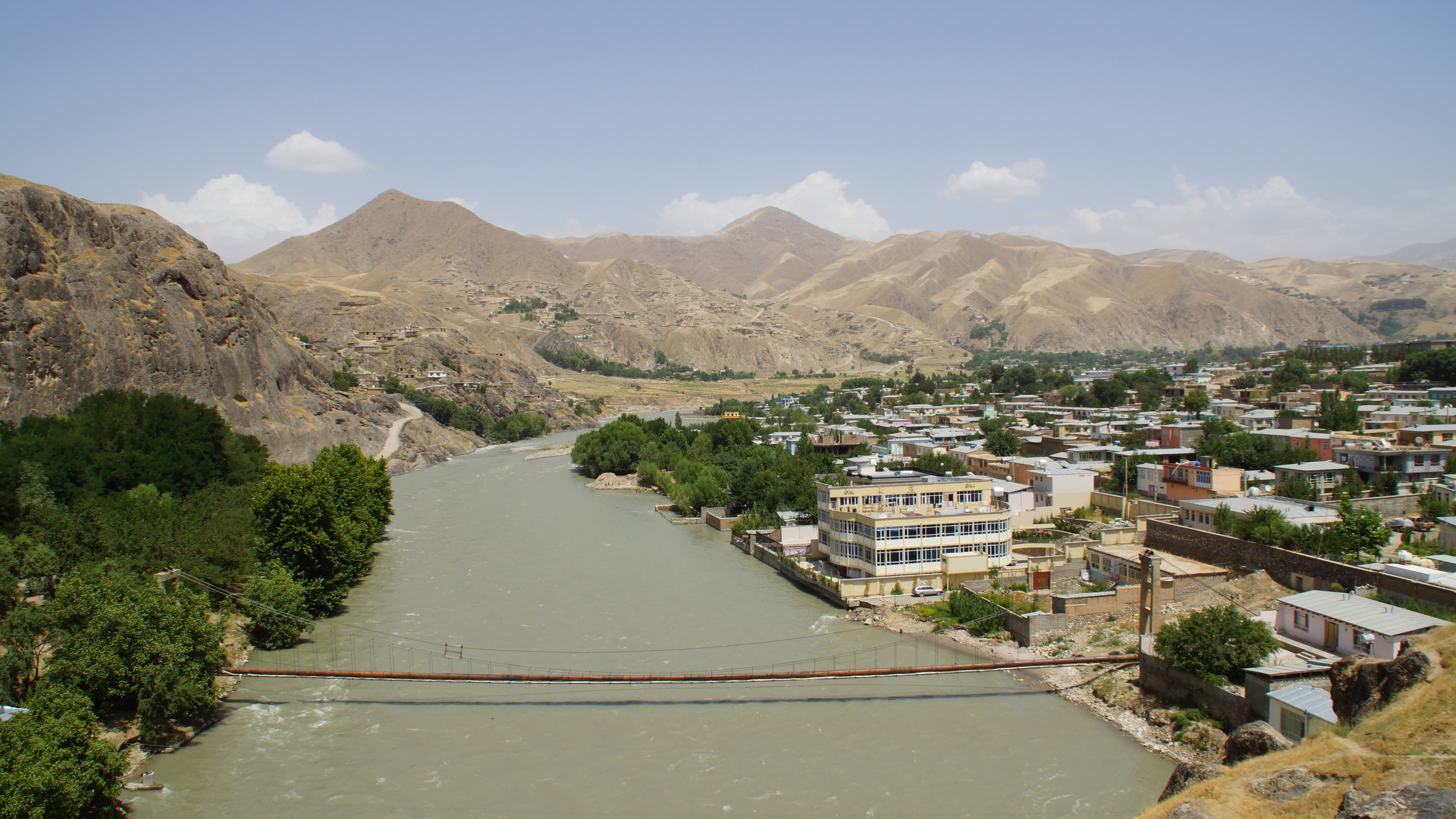
- The Kokcha River in Fayzabad

- Location in Afghanistan
- Coordinates: 37°7′03″N 70°34′47″E
- Country: Afghanistan
- Province: Badakhshan
- District: Fayzabad

Government
  - Type: Municipality

Area
  - Land: 159 km^{2} (61 sq mi)
- Elevation: 1,254 m (4,114 ft)

Population (2025)
  - Provincial capital: 85,477
  - Density: 538/km^{2} (1,390/sq mi)
  - Urban: 43,486
  - Rural: 41,991
- Time zone: UTC+04:30 (Afghanistan Time)
- ISO 3166 code: AF-FBD

Fayzabad or Faizabad (Pashto; (Note: Pashto pronunciation: [paɪ.zɑ.bɑd̪, faɪ.zɑ.bɑd̪]) Dari: (Note: Dari pronunciation: [fäj.zɑː.bɑ́ːd̪]) فیض آباد) is a city in northeastern Afghanistan that serves as the capital of Badakhshan Province. It is within the jurisdiction of Fayzabad District and has an estimated population of 85,477 people.

Fayzabad is home to Badakhshan University, which is located in the northwestern part of the city. The Fayzabad Airport is also around there, which provides limited domestic flight services. The city has a number of bazaars, business centers, public parks, banks, hotels, restaurants, mosques, hospitals, universities, and places to play sports or just relax. The city also has shrines of historical importance.

Fayzabad is at an altitude of 1,254 m (4,114 ft) above sea level and covers a land area of 159 km^{2} (61 sq mi). In 2015 there were about 10,605 dwelling units in it. The city is connected by a road network with Ishkashim to the southeast and Taloqan to the southwest. Fayzabad serves as the main commercial and administrative center of the Pamir region. The Kokcha River runs alongside the city.

== History ==
The city was called Jauz Gun until 1680 because of the many walnut ("jauz") farms in the area. The name was changed to Faizabad, which can be roughly translated as "abode of divine bounty, blessing, and charity", when the robe of Prophet Muhammed was delivered to the city. Tradition states that it was brought here by Muhammad Shaykh Ziya and Shaykh Niyaz after Wais Qaran brought it to Balkh.

At that time the city replaced Munjan as the capital of Badakhshan. Later, in 1768, Ahmad Shah Durrani took the robe to Kandahar, and established the Kirka Sharif there. The Sáhibzádas of Samarkand had removed the relic of the prophet from the capital in 1734 (A.D.). His clothing which came from the Turkish Campaign was taken by Timur to Samarkand. While the relic was being conveyed to Hindustan it was captured by Mir Yar Beg who kept it at Fayzabad.

In 1821 the city was destroyed by Mohammad Murad Beg, and the inhabitants removed to Kunduz. But after it was annexed by Emir Abdur Rahman Khan in 1888, the town recovered its former importance and became a considerable place of trade.

Many visitors used to come to a shrine erected in the city. The Khoja community of Badakhshan were made attendants at the shrine. There are seven historical forts in and around the city, several of which are in ruins. These forts were built to help defend the city and the road leading in and out.

In 1979 the town became a hotbed of Afghan mujahideen who sought to repel the Soviet invasion. Fayzabad was taken by Soviet forces in 1980 and became one of their bases in Afghanistan.

Many non-governmental organizations who worked in Badakhshan had made offices and places of residence in the new part of the city. Near the city, Germany was leading the Provincial Reconstruction Team (PRT). Danish and Czech teams had been a part of the PRT but the Czechs left in 2007 and the Danes in 2008. Their camps were based at Fayzabad Airport.

On 11 August 2021, the city was captured by the Taliban amid a rapid advance in the north after a massive offensive.

== Geography ==
Fayzabad is a strategic city that has historically connected Kabul with Kashgar in Xinjiang, China. The city is located on the right bank of the Kokcha River near where the river exits from a gorge and before it reaches a large open plain.

=== Climate ===
Fayzabad has a dry-summer continental climate (Köppen climate classification Dsa), closely bordering on a mediterranean climate (Köppen Csa). It has hot summers and cold, moderately wet and snowy winters. Precipitation mostly falls in spring and winter.

Climate data for Faiz abad (normals and extremes 1964-1983)
Month	Jan	Feb	Mar	Apr	May	Jun	Jul	Aug	Sep	Oct	Nov	Dec	Year
Record high °C (°F)	19.6 (67.3)	20.5 (68.9)	28.0 (82.4)	33.2 (91.8)	37.5 (99.5)	41.4 (106.5)	42.6 (108.7)	41.2 (106.2)	36.8 (98.2)	34.2 (93.6)	29.0 (84.2)	21.4 (70.5)	42.6 (108.7)
Mean daily maximum °C (°F)	6.0 (42.8)	8.2 (46.8)	14.3 (57.7)	21.3 (70.3)	25.1 (77.2)	31.6 (88.9)	35.7 (96.3)	34.9 (94.8)	29.9 (85.8)	23.1 (73.6)	15.9 (60.6)	9.7 (49.5)	21.3 (70.4)
Daily mean °C (°F)	−0.1 (31.8)	2.0 (35.6)	7.7 (45.9)	14.1 (57.4)	17.6 (63.7)	23.7 (74.7)	27.1 (80.8)	25.7 (78.3)	20.3 (68.5)	14.2 (57.6)	7.5 (45.5)	2.7 (36.9)	13.5 (56.4)
Mean daily minimum °C (°F)	−4.3 (24.3)	−1.2 (29.8)	2.4 (36.3)	8.0 (46.4)	10.6 (51.1)	13.9 (57.0)	16.8 (62.2)	15.5 (59.9)	10.3 (50.5)	6.3 (43.3)	1.5 (34.7)	−1.9 (28.6)	6.5 (43.7)
Record low °C (°F)	−23.5 (−10.3)	−24.5 (−12.1)	−10.5 (13.1)	−4.0 (24.8)	1.1 (34.0)	6.6 (43.9)	9.0 (48.2)	8.0 (46.4)	2.0 (35.6)	−2.9 (26.8)	−8.8 (16.2)	−17.2 (1.0)	−24.5 (−12.1)
Average precipitation mm (inches)	49.4 (1.94)	65.0 (2.56)	91.9 (3.62)	97.9 (3.85)	77.0 (3.03)	8.2 (0.32)	5.8 (0.23)	1.0 (0.04)	1.5 (0.06)	23.4 (0.92)	29.7 (1.17)	34.1 (1.34)	484.9 (19.08)
Average rainy days	3	6	11	14	12	4	2	0	1	4	4	4	65
Average snowy days	9	7	3	0	0	0	0	0	0	0	1	4	24
Average relative humidity (%)	79	76	71	67	61	43	30	28	33	46	64	72	56
Mean monthly sunshine hours	117.3	116.2	149.2	186.2	256.9	313.6	324.5	305.2	279.1	224.2	176.4	127.3	2,576.1
Source: NCEI(precipitation and humidity 1961-1983)

== Economy ==
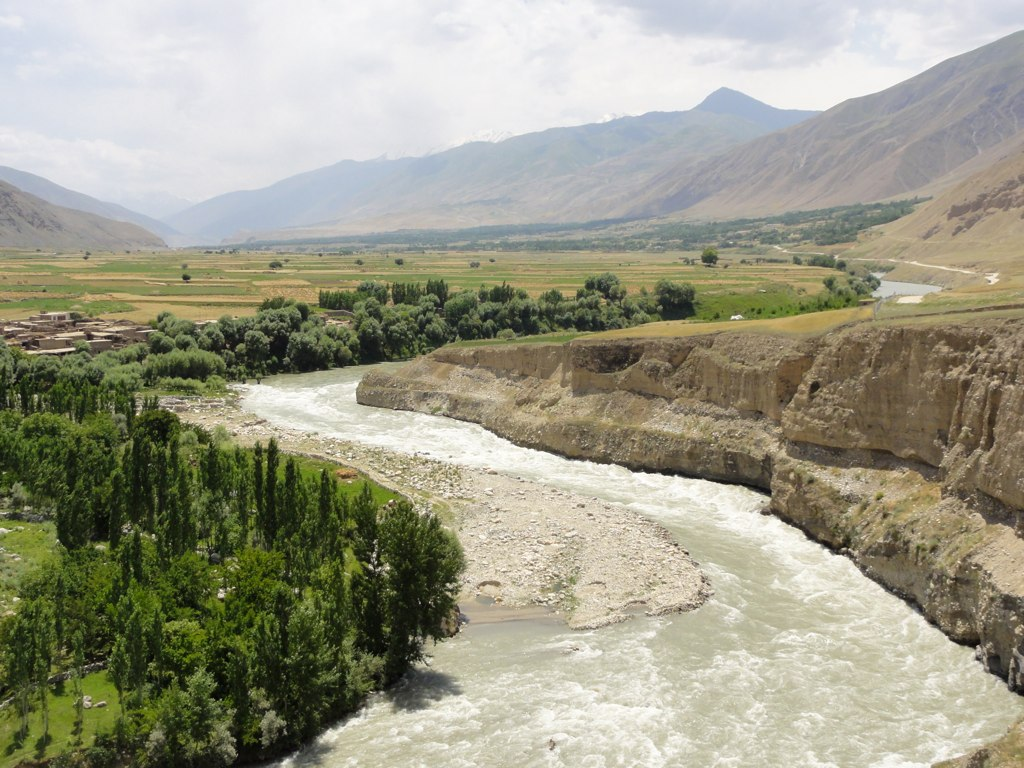
The Kokcha River plays an important part in the economy of Fayzabad

Before the 21st century, Fayzabad has been relatively isolated from other parts of Afghanistan because of the lack of paved roads. There are active bazaars in the city where items as diverse as cotton, cotton cloth and goods, salt, sugar, tea, indigo, and cutlery are traded. It has been several years since a branch of the asphalted Afghanistan Ring Road reached Fayzabad.

Several varieties of cash crops are grown in the vicinity including barley, wheat, and rice and there are a number of gardens and orchards. There has been some success in panning for gold in the vicinity, beryl can be found and there is a salt mine located nearby. The city also has a handicraft industry producing woolen goods and there are flour and rice mills. The Shorabak Dam, which is located several miles to the southeast of Fayzabad, provides 7.5 megawatts (MW) of electricity to the city.

In recent years a growing number of tourists visit Fayzabad because it serves as the gateway to the Wakhan National Park in Wakhan District. There are several guest houses in the city, Qasre Kokcha Hotel is the best among them which has security, central heating system, electricity and internet. There is also a guest house called Lapis Lazuli for expatriates. There are also plans for establishing direct road trade with China at the Wakhjir Pass in Wakhan District, which could further improve the economy of Fayzabad.

== Demographics ==
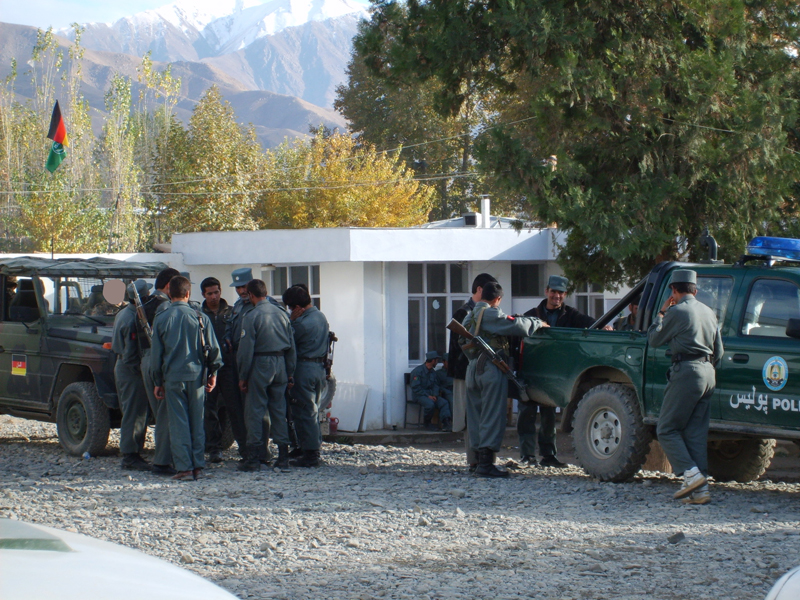
German soldiers of the ISAF with Afghan National Police in 2006.

Fayzabad has an estimated population of 85,477 people. The majority of them are ethnic Tajiks, while there are also minority communities of ethnic Pashtuns, Pamiris, Uzbeks, Hazaras and Turkmens.

Eleven languages are spoken in the city, including Dari, Pashto, Wakhi, Munji, Ishkashimi, Yazgulyam, Sarikoli, Shughni, Rushani, Uzbek and Turkmen. Multilingualism has become more common in Afghanistan in the last two decades.

== Education ==
There are a number of public and private schools in Fayzabad. A number of public and private universities are also found there. The Badakhshan University is a public university located in the northwestern part of the city.

== Healthcare ==
There is at least one government-run hospital. Other hospitals and clinics may also be found.

== See also ==
- List of cities in Afghanistan
- 2002 Hindu Kush earthquakes
