= Karaste Canal =

Irrigation canal in Afghanistan

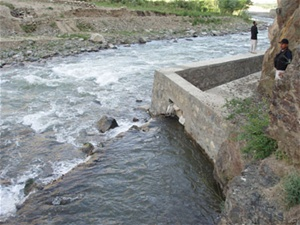
Karaste Canal, Tagab District.

The Karaste Canal is an irrigation canal in Tagab District of Badakhshan Province, Afghanistan. The canal draws water from the Tagab River.

The canal was initially constructed in the 1970s, but had functioned for only a single season. Reconstruction of the canal began in 2005, with USAID assistance, and was completed in 2007.
