= Mahipar Dam =

Dam in Kabul Province of Afghanistan

- Location within Afghanistan
- Country: Afghanistan
- Location: Surobi District, Kabul Province
- Coordinates: 34°33′21″N 69°28′45″E
- Purpose: Electricity
- Status: Operational
- Construction began: 1952
- Opening date: 1966
- Owner: Ministry of Energy and Water

Dam and spillways
- Type of dam: Gravity
- Impounds: Kabul River
- Height: 10 m (33 ft)
- Length: 67 m (220 ft)
- Elevation at crest: 1,645 m (5,397 ft)

Power Station
- Operator: Da Afghanistan Breshna Sherkat
- Annual generation: 40 MW

The Mahipar Dam is located on the Kabul River next to the Kabul–Jalalabad Road in the western part of the Surobi District in Kabul Province of Afghanistan. It is about 30 km (19 mi) away from the center of Kabul. It is a gravity dam owned and maintained by the country's Ministry of Energy and Water.

The Mahipar Dam was built in 1952 with the cooperation of Germany. It has a power station with 3 turbines that produce up to 40 megawatts of electricity. The power station is operated by Da Afghanistan Breshna Sherkat.

== See also ==
- List of dams and reservoirs in Afghanistan
- List of power stations in Afghanistan
