= Naghlu Dam =

Dam in Kabul, Afghanistan

Naghlu Dam نغلو برېښناکوټ
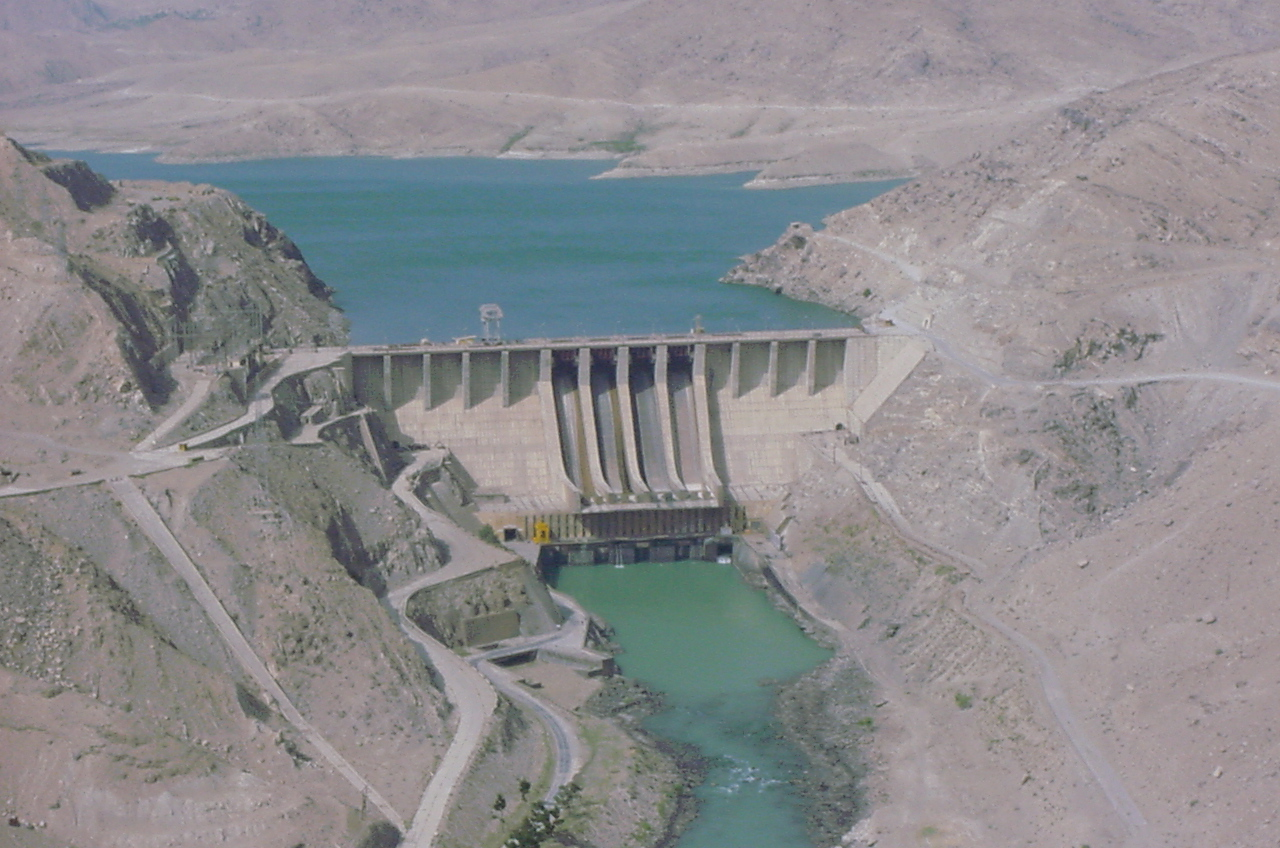
- Aerial view of Naghlu Dam in 2003

- Location within Afghanistan
- Country: Afghanistan
- Location: Surobi District, Kabul Province
- Coordinates: 34°38′28″N 69°43′01″E
- Status: Operational
- Construction began: 1960
- Opening date: 1968
- Owner: Ministry of Energy and Water

Dam and spillways
- Type of dam: Gravity
- Impounds: Kabul River
- Height: 110 m (361 ft)
- Length: 280 m (919 ft)

Reservoir
- Total capacity: 550,000,000 m^{3} (445,892 acre⋅ft)
- Active capacity: 375,000,000 m^{3} (304,017 acre⋅ft)
- Normal elevation: 1,190 m (3,904 ft)

Power Station
- Operator: Da Afghanistan Breshna Sherkat
- Commission date: 1967
- Hydraulic head: 61 m (200 ft) (nominal)
- Turbines: 4 × 25 MW Francis-type
- Installed capacity: 100 MW

The Naghlu Dam (Pashto: نغلو برېښناکوټ) is a gravity dam on the Kabul River in Surobi District of Kabul Province in Afghanistan. It is located 40 km (25 mi) east of the nation's capital Kabul. The primary purpose of the dam is hydroelectricity production. The dam supports a power station with a design capacity of 100 MW of electricity. It is connected to the national grid, and is one of the largest power plants in the country. It provides electricity to about 100,000 households in the Kabul region.

The Naghlu Dam is 110 m (361 ft) tall, 280 m (919 ft) long and its reservoir has a storage capacity of 550,000,000 m^{3} (445,892 acre⋅ft). The dam and its reservoir are managed by the Ministry of Energy and Water. Its power station is operated by Da Afghanistan Breshna Sherkat (DABS).

Construction of Naghlu Dam was financed and supervised by the Soviet Union between January 1960 and 1968. The first generator was commissioned in 1967. After the 1992 collapse of the Soviet-backed Democratic Republic of Afghanistan, the power station was used by supporters of Gulbuddin Hekmatyar as a way to deprive Kabul of electricity. The power station fell into disrepair during the late 1990s, which provided very little electricity. After the 2001 U.S.-led invasion only two generators were operational.

In August 2006, the Afghan Ministry of Energy and Water awarded the Russian company Technopromexport a $32.5 million contract to rehabilitate the two inoperable generators and replace the transformers. The first of the two became operational in September 2010 and the transformers were replaced by early 2012. The rehabilitation was funded by the World Bank. The second unit became operational by April 2018. In January 2016, the World Bank granted Afghanistan $83 million in aid to completely rebuild the Naghlu Dam. As of April 2019, all four generators of the Naghlu power station are operating.

== See also ==
- List of dams and reservoirs in Afghanistan
- List of power stations in Afghanistan
- Energy in Afghanistan
- Renewable energy in Afghanistan
