= Afghan Wireless =

Telecommunication company in Afghanistan

- Industry: Telecommunications
- Founded: 1998; 28 years ago
- Founders: Ehsan Bayat; Stuart Bentham; Lord Michael Cecil
- Headquarters: Kabul, Afghanistan
- Key people: Ehsan Bayat (chairman)
- Number of employees: 8,000 (2017)
- Parent: Telephone Systems International (TSI)
- Website: afghan-wireless.com

Afghan Wireless Communication Company, also known as Afghan Wireless and AWCC, is Afghanistan's first Wireless communications company. Founded in 1998, it is based in Kabul, Afghanistan with various regional offices. Headquartered in Kabul, Afghan Wireless provides 4G LTE and other services, such as internet and mobile payments to about five million subscribers across Afghanistan's 34 provinces. The company has partnerships with 425 carrier networks in 125 countries. Founded in 2002 by Ehsan Bayat, Afghan Wireless is a joint venture of Telephone Systems International and the Afghan Ministry of Communications.

== History ==
=== Founding and licensing ===
In 1998, Afghan-American telecommunications entrepreneur Ehsan Bayat won an exclusive license from Afghanistan's Taliban government to create a joint venture with the country's Ministry of Communications, which was given 20% ownership. The deal had been negotiated by investors from the United States, Britain, and Sweden. Afghan Wireless Communications Company, or AWCC, was established as a subsidiary of Telephone Systems International, and financial backing was provided by the British entrepreneurs Stuart Bentham and Lord Michael Cecil. In June 1999 the Taliban granted Afghan Wireless a 15-year monopoly on cell phone traffic in Afghanistan, and within the year Afghan Wireless had re-enabled Afghanistan's international country calling code. In 1999 and 2000 the company set up digital telephone exchanges in the cities of Kabul and Kandahar, replacing the outdated manual telephone switchboards that the country's telecommunications had long relied upon.

Although the Taliban were overthrown by an American invasion in 2001, Afghan Wireless was nevertheless the first company licensed to provide GSM wireless service in Afghanistan. With the lifting of the trade embargo, Afghan Wireless brought in technology from American vendors including WorldCom, TECORE Wireless Systems, and AirNet Communications Corporation. Afghan interim leader Hamid Karzai publicly made the first phone call on April 6, 2002, calling and speaking with the Afghan ambassador to the United Nations in New York City. As the network went public using a pre-paid platform, phone booths were set up for those unable to afford cellphones. In June 2002, Argent Networks in New Zealand was contracted to help Afghan Wireless develop its GSM mobile network. The following year Argent also developed a billing system for the network, and competing companies such as Roshan started to appear.

=== Growth and owner lawsuits ===
In 2002 Bayat allegedly attempted to buy out Cecil and Bentham, but the offers were disregarded as "derisory". Bayat and Afghan Wireless subsequently sued Cecil and Bentham for allegedly misappropriating money from the company. Cecil, Bentham, and two other founding investors counter-sued, claiming they had not received over £250 million in due shares and alleging "fraud, deceit, breach of contract and conspiracy". The case was dismissed from American courts and ultimately hidden from public records and dismissed in Bayat's favor in British courts in August 2011.

Starting around 2006, Afghan Wireless was one of five companies with towers damaged and destroyed by the Taliban, with the Taliban demanding that telecommunications companies in the country limit service. The attacks were reported stopped by 2009, with The Globe and Mail explaining that "public discontent with service disruptions overwhelmed religious or tribal affiliations." By June 2008, Afghan Wireless reported to have 2 million subscribers across all 34 of Afghanistan's provinces. The company had around 5 million users by 2009. In 2011 Afghan Wireless remained partially owned by the Afghan Ministry of Communications, which maintains a 10-20% stake.

=== Allegations of American intelligence links ===
In a 2011 report by Vanity Fair contributing editor David Rose, it was alleged that Afghan Wireless was linked to an American intelligence project called Operation Foxden, a Federal Bureau of Investigation and National Security Agency endeavor to wiretap Afghan Wireless' infrastructure for intelligence gathering on the Taliban regime. Although allegedly authorized to proceed on September 8, 2001, Operation Foxden was rendered moot by the September 11 attacks and invasion of Afghanistan. Rose claimed that in the operation's planning stages, the FBI and NSA helped transfer ownership of Afghan Wireless to a shell company, Netmobile, in Liechtenstein, to circumnavigate the 1999 Executive Order 13129 ban on American citizens doing business with the Taliban. In response to the article, Bayat denied that American intelligence agencies were behind the change in ownership, and that "to the contrary, my application for an exemption from U.S. sanctions was denied by the U.S. government." Bayat also denied that he or his companies had acted unlawfully, installed wiretaps, or acted as "an agent, informant or spy".

== 2010’s ==
Afghan Wireless launched a mobile-money feature in 2012 involving biometrics. In 2017, the Afghanistan Ministry of Finance gave Afghan Wireless a "Best Large Taxpayer" award.

Afghan Wireless announced that it had launched the first 4G LTE service in Afghanistan in May 2017, claiming position as the country's largest private employer, with 8,000 employees. That year, the company also partnered with 425 wireless networks spread throughout 125 countries, with five million clients and coverage in all of Afghanistan's 34 provinces.

In February 2018, Afghan Wireless announced that its mobile payment service could be used on electricity bills. The following month, the company signed a new license agreement with the Afghanistan Telecommunications Regulatory Authority (ATRA) for installation and operation of a fiber optic network. By April 2018, Afghan Wireless remained the only mobile communications company in the country providing 4G LTE HD and, that month, increased pay assistance to its employees attending Kardan University and Rana University.

In August 2018, AWCC launched Khazana, an SMS-based news and media subscription service.

In October 2018, Afghan Wireless launched 4.75G+ service in Kandahar City, upgrading subscribers from 4G to its higher-speed service.

As of December 2018, the AWCC My Money app was noted as the largest mobile payment service in Afghanistan.

In January 2019, in cooperation with World Bank Group member, the International Finance Corporation (IFC)'s Lighting Afghanistan program; AWCC launched its pay-as-you-go (PAYG) electrical service, reported to be Afghanistan's first off-grid solar powered electrical service.

=== FIFA sponsorship ===
AWCC was a sponsor of the 2018 FIFA World Cup held in Russia, which was then broadcast in Afghanistan for the first time by the Ariana Television Network.

== See also ==
- List of companies of Afghanistan
- Communications in Afghanistan
- List of telephone operating companies
