= Fayzabad Airport =

Airport in Fayzabad serving Badakhshan, Afghanistan

Fayzabad Airport Pashto: د فیض اباد هوائی ډګر
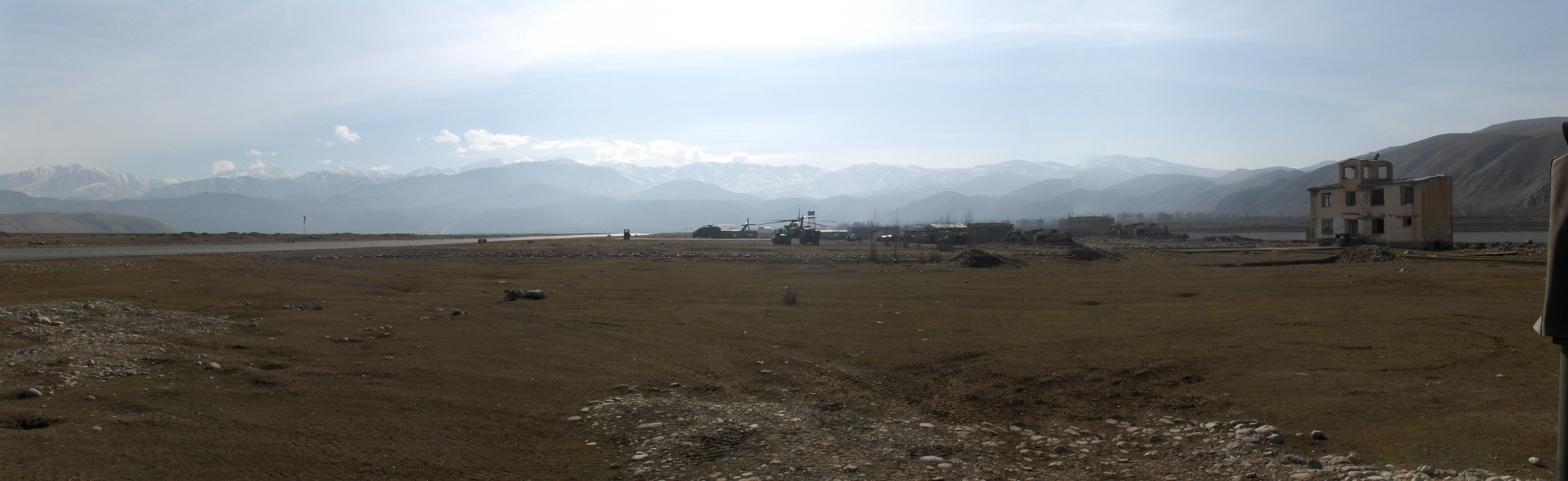
- Fayzabad Airport (2008)
- IATA: FBD; ICAO: OAFZ

Summary
- Airport type: Public
- Owner: Afghanistan
- Operator: Ministry of Transport and Civil Aviation
- Serves: Badakhshan Province
- Location: Fayzabad, Afghanistan
- Elevation AMSL: 3,842 ft / 1,171 m
- Coordinates: 37°07′10″N 70°31′06″E

Map
- Location of airport in Afghanistan

Runways
| Direction | Length | | Surface |
| Direction | m | ft | Surface |
|---|---|---|---|
| 18/36 | 1,844 | 6,049 | PSP |
- Sources: SkyVector.com, Ministry of Transport and Civil Aviation of Afghanistan, AIP Afghanistan

Fayzabad Airport (IATA: FBD, ICAO: OAFZ) is a domestic airport located about 3.5 mi (5.6 km) northwest of Fayzabad, which is the capital of Badakhshan Province in northeastern Afghanistan. It is under the country's Ministry of Transport and Civil Aviation, and serves the population of Badakhshan Province.

Built during the Soviet–Afghan War, Fayzabad Airport is notable for the runway being constructed of pierced steel planking (PSP or Marsden Matting) along its full width and length. Construction of a new asphalt runway was completed during the summer of 2012, funded by USAID and Asian Development Bank. It runs parallel to the metal runway which has been blocked off by large rocks.

In August 2023, members of the Afghanistan Freedom Front claimed killing a Taliban militant and injuring three others at the entrance of Fayzabad Airport.

== See also ==
- List of airports in Afghanistan
