= Badakhshan University =

University in Badakhshan, Afghanistan

Coordinates: 37.1009°N 70.5562°E

- دانشگاه‌ بدخشان / د بدخشان پوهنتون
- Established: 1996
- President: Qasim Aria
- Principal: 136
- Administrative staff: 155
- Students: 6,000
- Location: Fayzabad, Badakhshan province, Afghanistan
- Website: badakhshan.edu.af/en

Badakhshan University (Note: Pashto: د بدخشان پوهنتون Dari: دانشگاه بدخشان) (built in 1996) is located in Badakhshan province, northeastern Afghanistan. Established in 1988, Badakhshan University is a non-profit public higher education institution located in the large town of Faizabad (population range of 50,000-249,999 inhabitants).

Notable alumni of Badakhshan University include Faiza Darkhani.

== See also ==
- List of universities in Afghanistan
