= Sarah E. Gergel =

American ecologist

- Education: University of Wisconsin (PhD)
- Known for: Landscape ecology
- Scientific career
- Fields: Ecology
- Thesis: Human-altered disturbance regimes: effects of flood control along the Wisconsin River. (2001)
- Doctoral advisor: Monica G. Turner
- Website: sarahgergel.net/lel/

Sarah E. Gergel is an American ecologist and professor in the Department of Forest and Conservation Sciences at the University of British Columbia (UBC), Canada. She is a landscape ecologist, known for her research linking landscapes and rivers, and her role in enhancing training in the practice of landscape ecology.

== Education and career ==
Sarah Gergel studied wildlife ecology an undergraduate student at the University of Florida. There she was introduced to landscape ecology as she worked as a research assistant to the landscape ecologist Larry Harris. She then moved to University of Wisconsin-Madison to work with the landscape ecologist Monica Turner to obtain her master's degree in 1996, on "Dissolved organic carbon as an indicator of the scale of watershed influence on north temperate lakes and rivers” and PhD in 2001 on “Human-altered disturbance regimes: effects of flood control along the Wisconsin River". Following her PhD, she was awarded a postdoctoral fellowship to the National Center for Ecological Analysis and Synthesis at University of California, Santa Barbara, where she developed models of how the abundance and configuration of how the abundance and configuration of wetlands influences flows of nutrients from agricultural land into freshwater. She was then hired by the University of British Columbia in 2003 as an assistant professor in the Department of Forest and Conservation Sciences in UBC's Faculty of Forestry. She is now a professor in the same department and is also Associate Dean, Diversity and Inclusion, for the faculty.

== Research ==
At UBC, Gergel has expanded her landscape ecology work to develop novel methods to examine changes in ecosystem services over time and connect quantitative landscape ecology methods to local knowledge, through work with first nations and collaborations with CIFOR

Gergel led the development of a key book for the field of landscape ecology, Learning Landscape Ecology, that brought together a diverse set of landscape ecology researchers to write chapters describing a wide variety of techniques used in landscape ecology. The first edition was published in 2002. It has been widely used around the world and has been translated into Korean. In 2017, a fully revised and updated second edition was published which was more international and included a new section on social-ecological systems approaches and newer methods and techniques. The new edition of this book was recognised as being an essential contribution to the study and teaching of landscape ecology.

== Awards and honours ==
In 2018, Gergel was elected a Fellow of the American Association for the Advancement of Science in its section of Geology and Geography.

== Books ==
- Learning Landscape Ecology: A Practical Guide to Concepts and Techniques (co-authored Turner, M.) 1st edition 2002, 2nd edition 2017
