= Ariana Television Network =

Private Afghan television network

Ariana Radio & Television Network شبکه رادیو تلویزیون آریانا
- Country: Afghanistan
- Broadcast area: Worldwide
- Headquarters: Kabul, Afghanistan

Programming
- Languages: Dari, Pashto
- Picture format: HDTV 1080i

Ownership
- Owner: Ehsan Bayat
- Sister channels: Ariana News, Ariana FM 93.5

History
- Launched: August 17, 2005; 20 years ago

Links
- Website: www.arianatelevision.com www.ariananews.af www.ariana.fm

Availability

Terrestrial
- Normal antenna: 2 VHF, 46 UHF (Kabul); 49 UHF (Kandahar); 55 UHF (Herat); 51 UHF (Mazar-i-Sharif); 52 UHF (Kunduz); 47 UHF (Jalalabad); 45 UHF (Taloqan); 53 UHF (Puli Khumri); 49 UHF (Ghazni); 55 UHF (Khost)

Streaming media
- Service(s): TV, Radio, Digital

Ariana Television Network (ATN) (Dari/Pashto: شبکه رادیو تلویزیون آریانا) is a private television and radio broadcaster based in Kabul, Afghanistan. The network was launched on 17 August 2005 by Afghan-American entrepreneur Ehsan Bayat, founder of Afghan Wireless Communication Company. ATN broadcasts in the Dari and Pashto languages, with coverage across all 34 provinces of Afghanistan as well as international broadcasts via satellite and digital platforms.

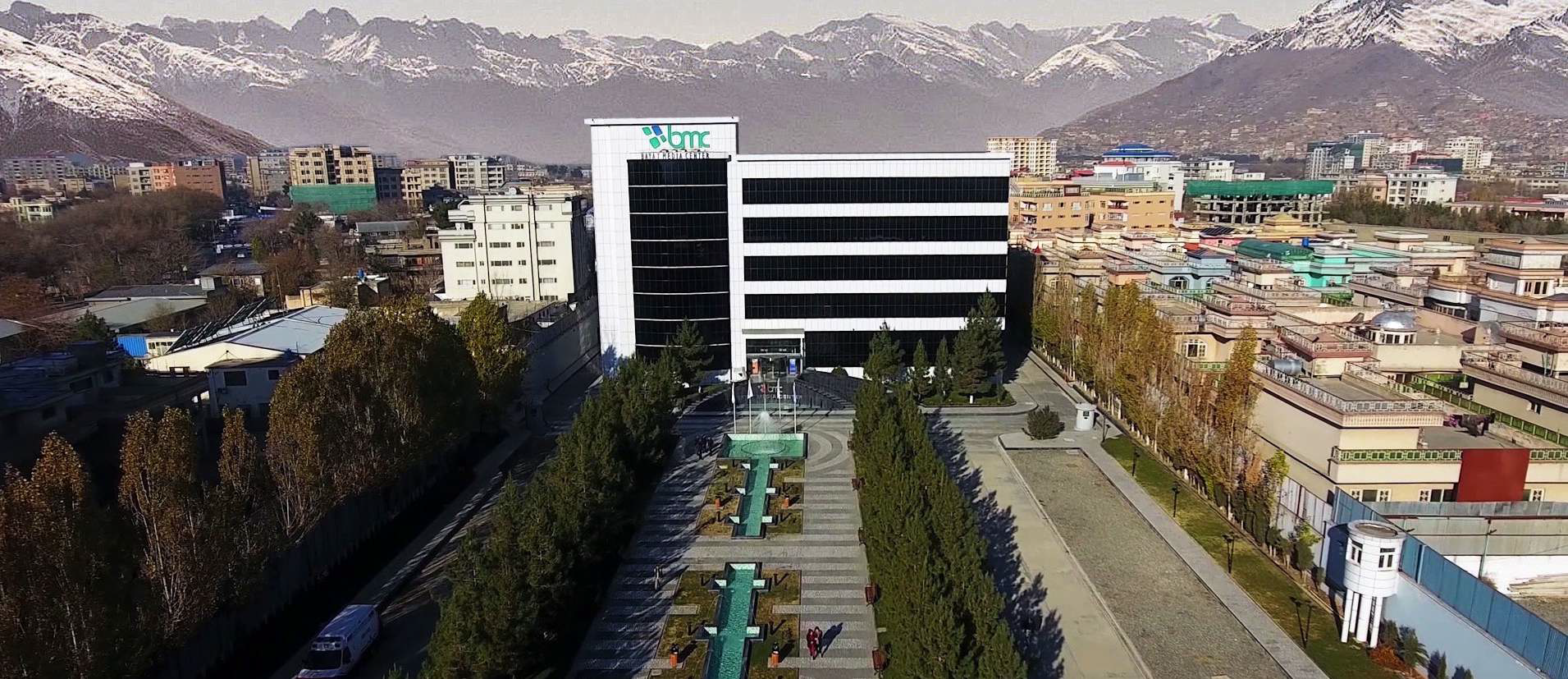
Bayat Media Centre located in Kabul, Afghanistan

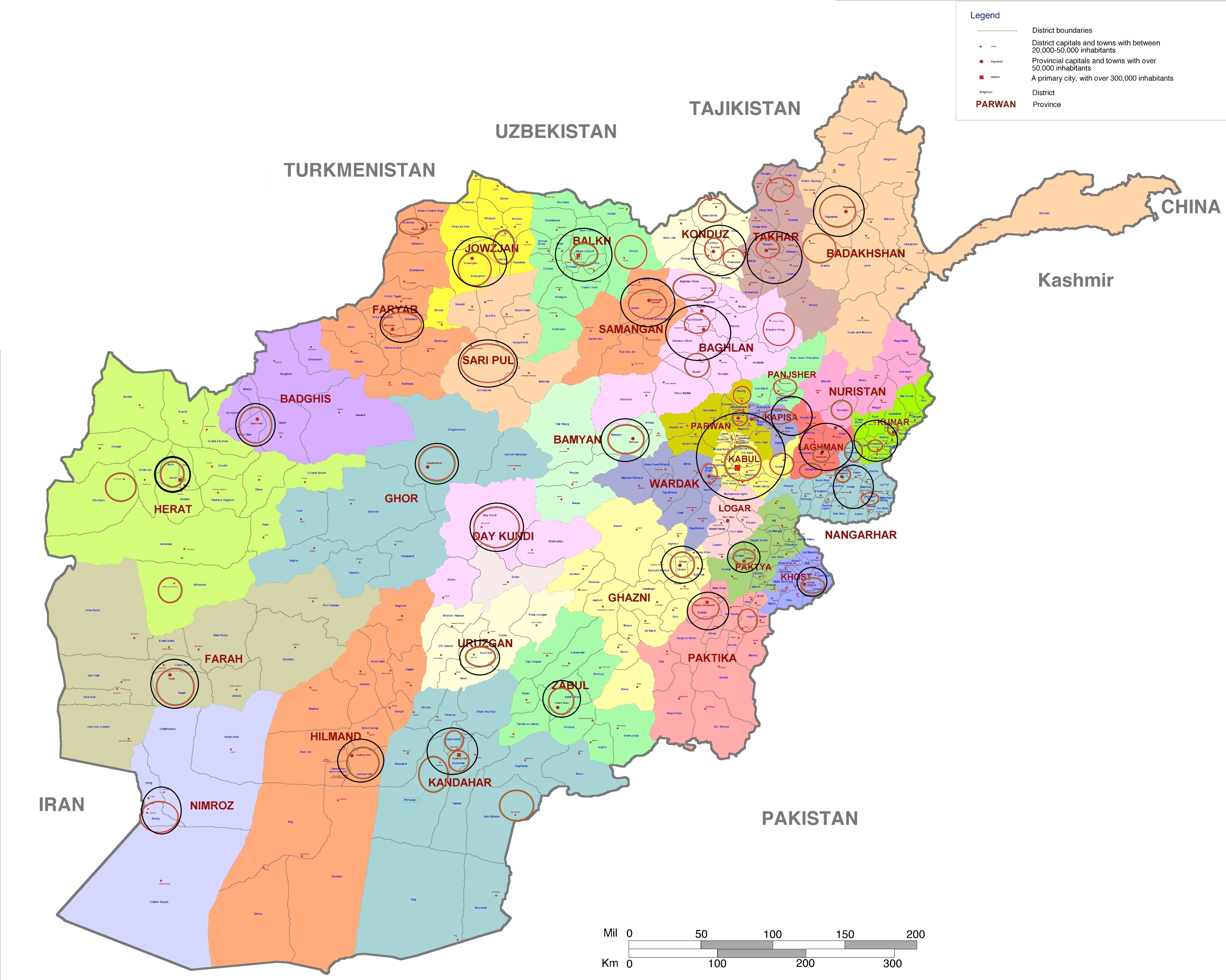
Ariana Television and Ariana FM Coverage Map across the country

== History ==
ATN was launched on 17 August 2005 as a private television and radio network based in Kabul. Ariana FM 93.5, the network's radio station, broadcasts in the Dari and Pashto languages and operates 24 hours a day. Ariana FM also offers a livestream option, which allows audiences to listen to programs on the radio, online, and through mobile applications.

In 2006, the network began broadcasting internationally. In 2014, ATN underwent rebranding and expanded its operations with the launch of its sister channel, Ariana News.

After the Taliban captured Kabul in August 2021, the network reportedly struggled due to the implementation of new media policies under Taliban authority. While many women employed by the network resigned soon after the capture, others at ATN were asked to resign under Taliban pressure. Some female employees of Ariana News were able to continue broadcasting on-air until later that year, but Taliban intelligence officers directed executives to impose strict dress codes for female employees and to segregate male and female employees. Female employees were eventually barred from presenting, and subsequent administrative decrees restricted women's mobility and access to public spaces.

Taliban authorities continued to impose restrictions on the network, with reports of violence against journalists emerging frequently.

In 2022, the Taliban captured two Kabul-based ATN journalists, Waris Hasrat and Aslam Ejab, detaining them for unknown reasons. Following international protest, they were released two days later.

== Frequency ==
Ariana Television Network (ATN) © LyngSat https://www.lyngsat.com/tvchannels/af/Ariana-TV-Network.html
Position	Satellite	Beam EIRP (dBW)	Frequency	System	SR FEC	Video	Lang.	Source
52.5°E	Al Yah 1	East 51–52	11938 H	DVB-S2 8PSK	27500 3/4	MPEG-4 HD 1080	Persian & Pashto	N Stanislav 240131
52.5°E	Al Yah 1	East 51–52	12015 H	DVB-S2 8PSK	27500 3/4	MPEG-4 HD 1080	Persian & Pashto	N Stanislav 210623
52.5°E	Al Yah 1	MENA 0	12054 H	DVB-S2 8PSK	27500 3/4	MPEG-4 HD 1080	Persian & Pashto	N Stanislav 250210

== Social responsibility and recognition ==
The network has run several public service campaigns relating to Afghan social issues, covering topics such as diabetes, environmental conservation, gender equality, anti-smoking/anti-drug initiatives, ending modern slavery (including forced labour, child slavery, forced and/or early marriage, debt slavery, and human trafficking), childhood brain development, and COVID-19 awareness.

ATN has received several Asia-Pacific Broadcasting Union (ABU) Asiavision awards for its reporting, including 2024 coverage of Afghan refugees returning from Pakistan.

== Network infrastructure ==
ATN maintains broadcast infrastructure that allows for access to its content across Afghanistan. The network's terrestrial and satellite coverage provides nationwide access and extends to parts of Asia, Europe, and North America. The Bayat Media Center, ATN's headquarters in Kabul, houses facilities for content production and broadcasting.

== See also ==
- Television in Afghanistan
- Communications in Afghanistan
- Internet in Afghanistan
