= Ehsan Bayat =

Afghan American business entrepreneur

- Born: July 15, 1963 (age 63); Ghazni Province, Kingdom of Afghanistan
- Citizenship: American
- Education: New Jersey Institute of Technology
- Occupation: CEO of Bayat Group
- Website: Official website

Ehsanollah "Ehsan" Bayat (Pashto/Dari: احسان الله بیات, born July 15, 1963) is an Afghan American business entrepreneur who is the founder and chairman of Bayat Group, Afghanistan's largest private company.

== Early life and education ==
Bayat was born in Kabul; his family belongs to the Qizilbash community of Afghanistan. He grew up in Kabul's Kārte Seh district and attended Isteqlal Primary and High School.

During the 1979 Soviet invasion of Afghanistan, Bayat and his immediate family immigrated to Flushing, New York. From 1982 to 1986, Bayat attended the New Jersey Institute of Technology (NJIT), where he earned a Bachelor's degree in Engineering. After graduating from NJIT, he embarked upon an entrepreneurial career, founding successful import/export and wholesale food distribution companies.

After graduating college, Bayat maintained strong ties with family and friends living in Afghanistan, and among the Afghan diaspora living in Pakistan, the United States, and throughout the world. Committed to rebuilding Afghanistan, he returned in early 2002, shortly after the fall of Afghanistan's Taliban government in November 2001.

== Career ==
He is the founder and chairman of Bayat Group, Afghanistan's largest employer and diversified services company.

=== Bayat Group companies ===
According to an investigation by Vanity Fair, Bayat brokered a deal with the Taliban government to establish Afghan Wireless Communication Company (AWCC). The project was funded by the FBI and CIA as part of Project Foxhole and Bayat maintained close ties to senior Taliban officials while serving as an intelligence asset.

AWCC was Afghanistan's first wireless company and operates in each of Afghanistan's 34 provinces, providing over 5,000,000 Afghan businesses and consumers with a world-class high-speed global network.

In 2005, Bayat founded Ariana Television Network (ATN), Afghanistan's largest privately owned media network, reaching a national audience of approximately 25,000,000 Afghans across 34 provinces.

AWCC and Ariana Television are the two largest divisions of the Bayat Group. Bayat Energy, is an oil and gas exploration, development and production company founded by Bayat. In October 2016, Bayat Power, a division of Bayat Energy, signed an agreement with the Government of Afghanistan to build Bayat-1, a gas-fired power plant in Sheberghan, Jawzjan Province. When all three phases of Bayat-1 are completed, the power plant will be capable of generating 200 Megawatts of electricity, sufficient power for approximately 200,000 homes and businesses. In 2018, Bayat Power also signed a power purchase agreement (PPA) to sell 40MW of energy generated from the new plant to the Government of Afghanistan. In April 2019, Bayat Power acquired, and will be the first power company in the world to operate, a Siemens SGT-A45 Mobile Turbine.

Bayat Group owns companies operating within the construction, security, logistics and consumer goods sectors, as well as:

- Ariana Network Services
- Ariana Network Services
- Bayat Energy
- Best Jobs
- Fine Media Consulting Group
- Fine Mineral Water

Bayat Group has championed building the capabilities its workforce and supported Afghan economic development by dedicating significant resources to developing the educational, entrepreneurial and administrative capabilities of its executive, managerial and front line staffs. Bayat Group also provides scholarship assistance to employees attending Afghan Universities, and its internal professional development program offers more than 50 professional development courses.

== Bayat Foundation ==
In 2005, Ehsan Bayat and his wife, Fatema Bayat, established Bayat Foundation to aid at-risk Afghans and Afghan refugees. The Bayat Foundation has sponsored more than 500 projects dedicated to improving the health and welfare of Afghans, including the construction of 13 maternity hospitals which have treated more than 21,000,000 Afghan women and children.

== Awards and honors ==
Ehsan Bayat has received the following awards and honors, in recognition of his achievements as a Business Leader and Philanthropist:

- 2019: On March 8, Bayat was inducted into the New Jersey Institute of Technology Alumni Hall of Fame
- 2018: Afghan-American Chamber of Commerce (AACC )Leadership Award, also delivered the keynote address for its business conference in April
- 2016: New Jersey Institute of Technology Alumni Achievement Award
- 2014: Radio Azadi's Nowruz Man of the Year in recognition of exceptional individual contributions to Peace, Democracy and Culture in Afghanistan
- 2012: Honorary Degree of Doctor of Humane Letters from American University of Afghanistan for his works
- 2011: Excellence for his commitment to Afghanistan presented by 4,000 AWCC employees
- 2010: Mahatma Gandhi Humanitarian Award from the Friends of the South Asian American Communities
- 2008: Man of the Year Award from Afghan-Americans in California
- 2008: Corporate Social Responsibility Award from the Canada-Afghanistan Business Council
- 2007: Man of the Year Award from Sitara magazine
- 2007: Humanitarian of the Year award from Zeba Magazine
- 2007: First recipient of Businessman of the Year Award by the Afghan-American Chamber of Commerce in Washington, D.C.
- 2006: National Human Rights Award from the Afghanistan Human Rights Association by President Hamid Karzai

== Personal life ==
Bayat resides in Ponte Vedra Beach, Florida, United States, with his wife, Fatema.
