= Surobi District, Kabul =

Coordinates: 34.63°N 69.73°E

Surobi District
- District
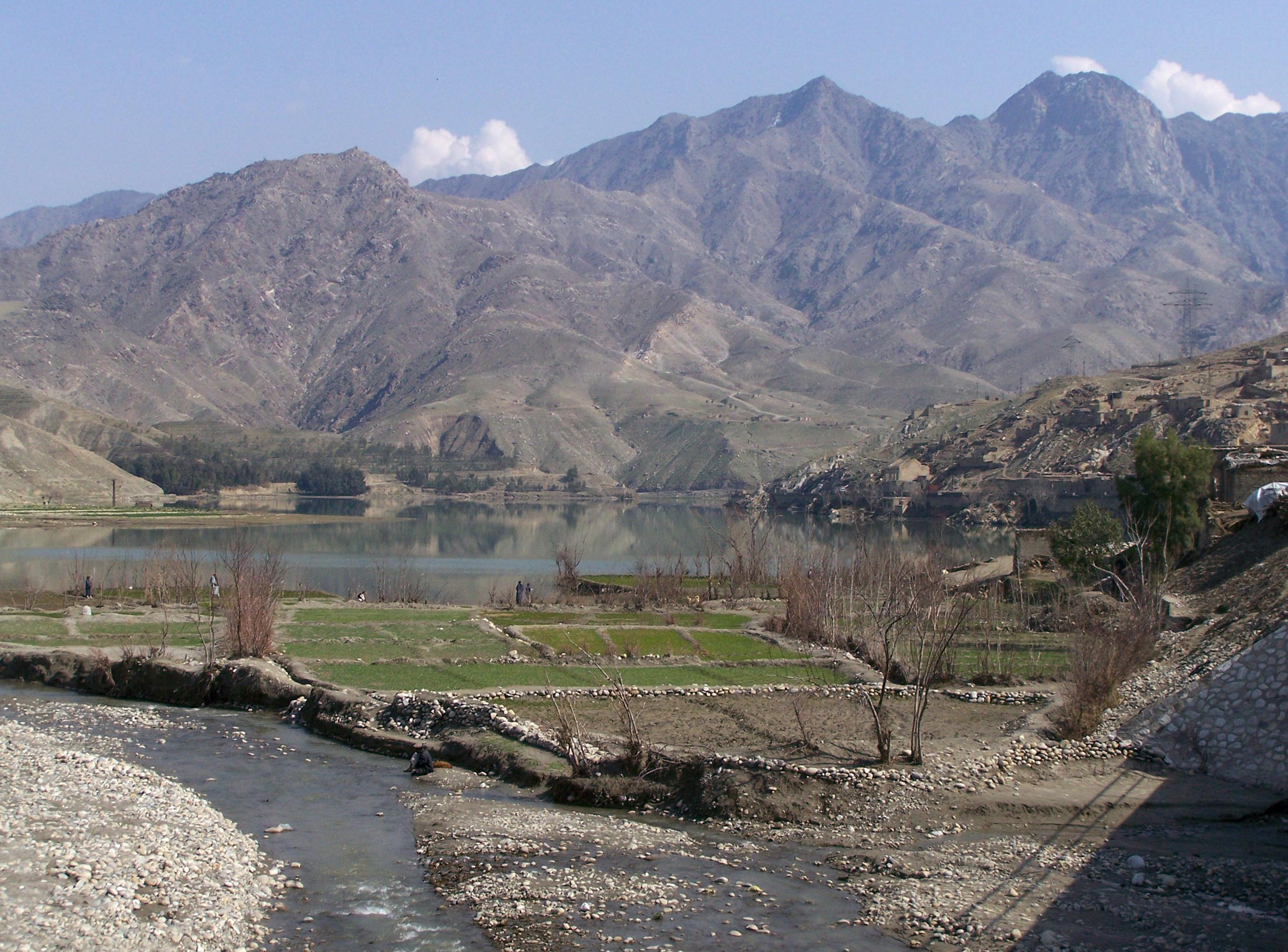

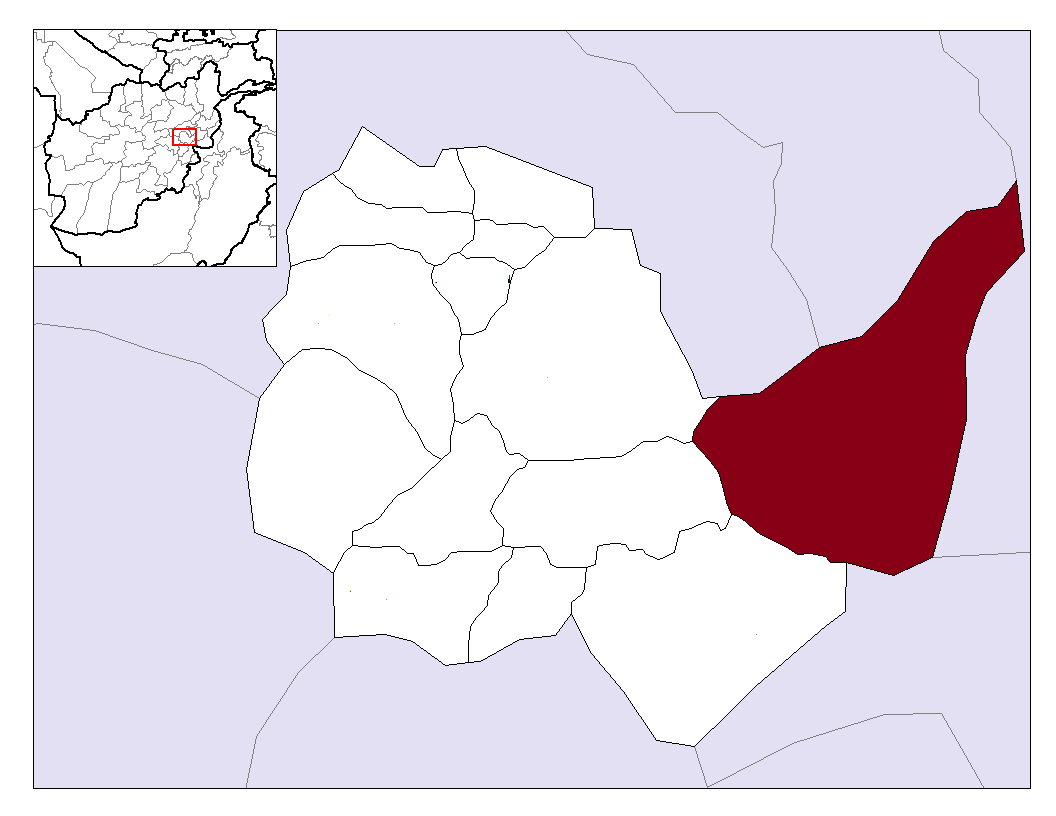
- Location in Kabul Province
- Country: Afghanistan
- Province: Kabul Province
- Capital: Surobi

Population (2015)
  - Total: 56,642
- Time zone: UTC+04:30 (AST)

Surobi, (Pashto: د سروبي ولسوالۍ; Dari: ولسوالی سروبی), Sarobi, or Sarubi District, is a district of Kabul Province, Afghanistan. Its capital, Surobi, lies about 60 kilometres east of Kabul along the A01 highway, although much of the district lies northeast of Kabul. Surobi was the birthplace of Faisal Babakarkhail, a Jihadi commander famous for his courage against Soviet troops during the Soviet–Afghan War. Its principal river is the Kabul River.

== History ==
In the 1990s, the Khalid Bin Whalid training camp was situated in the district. In 1998, the camp was leveled by U.S. cruise missiles in retaliation for the 1998 United States embassy bombings.

On July 23, 2007, an improvised explosive device detonated near a US vehicle in the district, killing four soldiers: 1st Sgt. Michael S. Curry Jr., Sgt. Travon T. Johnson, Pfc. Adam J. Davis and Pfc. Jessy S. Rogers.

"One of the last reports of Uzbek IMU (Islamic Movement of Uzbekistan) fighters active inside Afghanistan" came from Surobi District in October 2007.

Surobi was the site of a major action by the French Foreign Legion in December 2009.

== Demographics ==
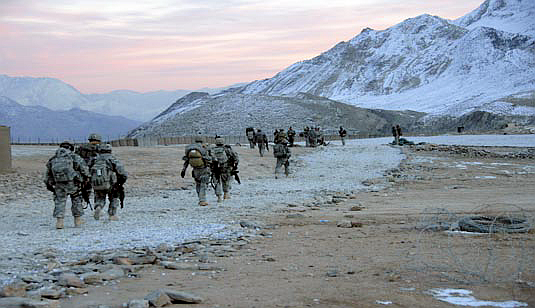
US Army GIs return to their landing zone, to return to their base in Surobi District, Kabul Province, Afghanistan.

The Afghan Ministry of Rural Rehabilitation and Development (MRRD) along with UNHCR and Central Statistics Office (CSO) of Afghanistan estimates the population of the district to be around 44,871. According to AIMS and UNHCR, Pashtuns make up over 90% of the total population, while ethnic Pashais make up the remaining 10% of the population.

== Geography ==
Surobi District borders Bagrami and Deh Sabz districts to the west, Parvan and Kapisa provinces to the north, Laghman Province to the east, and Nangarhar Province and Khaki Jabbar District to the south.

There are 130 villages in Surobi District. The Kabul River travels through the centre of the district and keeps the two sides of the district quite green. Three dams are in the district — Naghlu Dam, Mahipar Dam and Barqi-Surobi Dam — which generate electricity for Kabul and the district itself. However, due to lack of water, Mahipar Dam is out of order for now. Each village has its own governor or leader.

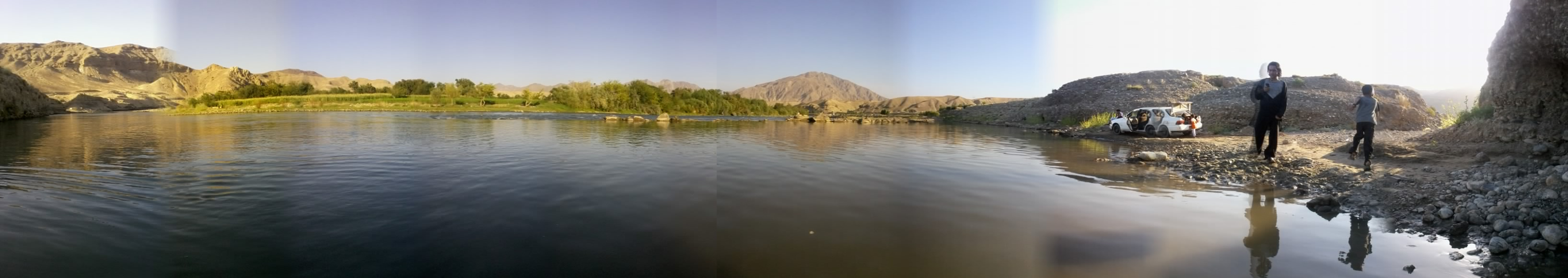
Surobi Panorama - Kabul Jalalabad Road
