= Fayzabad District, Badakhshan =

Fayzabad فیض‌آباد
- District
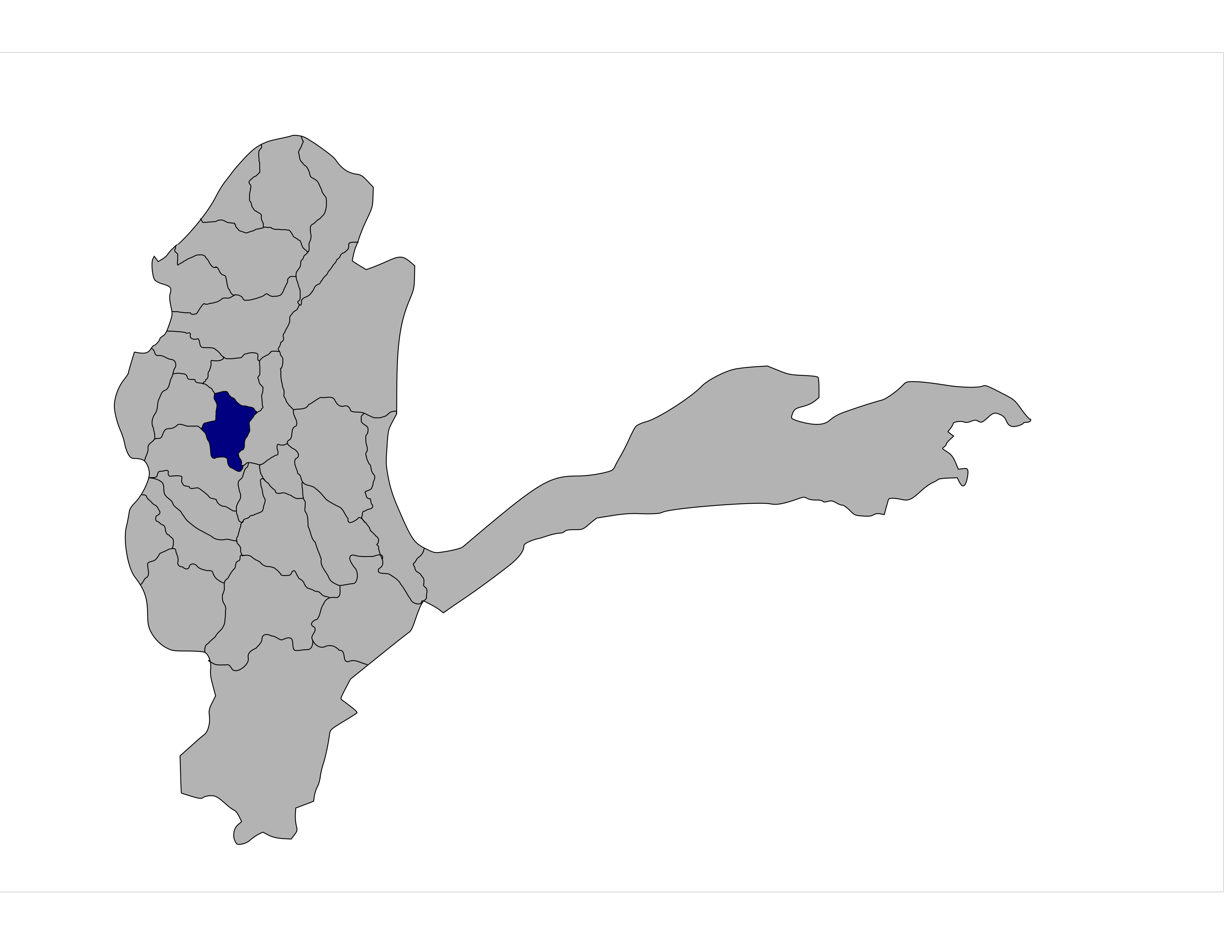

- Location in Afghanistan
- Coordinates: 37.0508°N 70.5797°E
- Country: Afghanistan
- Province: Badakhshan
- Capital: Fayzabad

Population
  - Total: 78,757
- Time zone: UTC+4:30

Fayzabad District (Dari: فیض‌آباد) is one of 30 districts that comprise Badakhshan province, in northeastern Afghanistan. The city of Fayzabad serves as its capital. In 2005, several portions of the district were sub-divided to create several new districts within the province. The remaining portion is home to approximately 75,577 residents, who are mostly peasants.

== See also ==
- Districts of Afghanistan
