= COVID-19 pandemic in Afghanistan =

- Disease: COVID-19
- Pathogen: SARS-CoV-2
- Location: Afghanistan
- First outbreak: Wuhan, Hubei, China
- Index case: Herat
- Arrival date: 24 February 2020 (6 years, 8 months and 5 days)
- Confirmed cases: 235,214
- Recovered: 201,269
- Deaths: 7,998

Government website
- moph.gov.af/en/covid-19-pandemic

The COVID-19 pandemic in Afghanistan was part of the worldwide pandemic of COVID-19, caused by severe acute respiratory syndrome coronavirus 2 (SARS-CoV-2). The virus was confirmed to have spread to Afghanistan when its index case, in Herat, was confirmed on 24 February 2020.

As of 18 September 2026, there have been 235,214 confirmed positive cases and 7,998 deaths. As of 13 September 2021, there have been 118,180 recoveries. Kabul Province has had the highest number of COVID-19 cases in Afghanistan, at 18,896, followed by Herat with 9,343 cases, and Balkh with 3,431. However, on 5 August 2020, an official survey from the Ministry of Public Health reported that approximately a third of the country's population, or roughly 10 million people had contracted COVID-19.

== Background ==
=== Origins ===
On 12 January 2020, the World Health Organization (WHO) confirmed that a novel coronavirus was the cause of a respiratory illness in a cluster of people in Wuhan, Hubei, China, which was reported to the WHO on 31 December 2019. The case fatality ratio for COVID-19 has been much lower than SARS of 2003, but the transmission has been significantly greater, with a significant total death toll. Model-based simulations for Afghanistan indicate that the 95% confidence interval for the time-varying reproduction number R_{t} was below 1.0 and falling from November 2020 to February 2021.

=== Mass returnees from Iran and Pakistan ===
In March 2020, at least 150,000 Afghans returned from Iran, due to the outbreak across the country, at the Islam Qala border in Herat Province. As many as over 1.000 people a day crossed the border during the month. Between March and April 2020, the number of cases surged in Herat Province to over 200. At the Chaman and Torkham borders, over 60,000 Afghans returned from Pakistan in three days.

== Timeline ==
=== February 2020 ===
On 23 February, at least three citizens of Herat who had recently returned from Qom, Iran were suspected of COVID-19 infection. Blood samples were sent to Kabul for further testing. On 24 February, Afghanistan confirmed the first COVID-19 case involving one of the three people from Herat, a 35-year-old man.

=== March 2020 ===
==== 1 to 14 March – Early spread ====
On 7 March, three new cases were confirmed in Herat Province, raising the total number of positive cases in Afghanistan to four.

On 10 March, the first case was reported outside of Herat province, in Samangan Province, meaning that there was a total of five cases in Afghanistan. This count later rose to seven in the evening.

On 14 March, the tenth positive case was confirmed. The Ministry of Public Health announced that Balkh Province and Kapisa Province had their first cases. Samangan also had their third positive case of coronavirus infection. The eleventh case was also announced that day. The patient from Balkh Province had fled after testing positive.

On 14 March, the first recovery from the coronavirus in Afghanistan was recorded as a patient in Herat, who was also the first positive case.

==== 15 to 24 March – First death ====
Five new cases were reported on 15 March, including the first case in Daykundi Province.

On 16 March, five new positive cases were identified, meaning that the total number of cases rose to 21. 38 patients, including one positive patient, escaped from quarantine in Herat Province, but were quarantined upon return. Also on that day, the Taliban announced that they had arrested the runaway patient from Balkh Province and had handed him back to health authorities.

On 17 March, there were 22 total cases confirmed. Also on that day, seven patients that escaped from Herat Hospital returned. By 19 March, two new positive cases were confirmed for the first time in Badghis and Logar provinces.

On 22 March, 10 new cases were reported out of 97 tests, resulting in a total of 34 positive cases. New cases were reported in Ghazni, Kandahar and Zabul provinces. The two new cases in Kabul Province were both foreign diplomats. The first possible fatality of COVID-19 in Afghanistan was also announced on 22 March, a man who had visited a hospital in Herat because he had heart disease, but who had also shown signs of COVID-19.

On 22 March, Khalilullah Hekmati, head of Balkh's public health directorate, announced the first official death of an Afghan due to COVID-19, a man who died in Chimtal District, in Balkh Province. By the end of the day, the number of cases increased to 40, after six new cases were reported. These included the first two cases in Farah Province and the first case in Ghor Province. Three new cases were also reported in Herat. 18 new cases in one day marked the biggest increase of positive cases in a single day at the time. On 23 March, two new cases were reported in the provinces of Logar and Samangan. On 24 March, 32 new cases were reported, making the total number of cases 74. All of the new cases were reported in Herat.

==== 25 to 31 March – Outbreak ====
On 25 March, five new positive cases were reported, as well as the second death in the country. The total climbed up to 79. The figure later rose to 84 positive cases. The first case was also announced in Nimruz Province. The second recovery was also reported.

On 26 March, two deaths were announced. The total death toll increased to four. Ten new positive cases were also reported; eight were in Herat Province and two were in Nimruz Province.

On 27 March, 16 new cases were announced by the Ministry of Health. This included 11 new cases in Herat Province, three in Farah Province and one in Ghor Province. The total number of cases reached 110. The third recovery in the country was also reported. By 29 March, there was a total of 120 positive cases. On 30 March, 25 new cases were announced, meaning that the total number of cases increased to 145. The first cases were recorded in Badakhshan, Nangarhar, Paktia and Sar-e Pol provinces. Two new recoveries were also reported. On 31 March, the Ministry of Health reported four new cases from 60 tests. Two of the cases were reported in Kandahar, while one new case each was recorded in Daykundi and Nimruz provinces. 22 other positive cases were later announced as positive with twelve in Herat, six in Kabul, and one new case each in Baghlan (the first in the province), Ghazni and Paktia provinces. By the end of March, the number of positive cases had reached 196.

=== April 2020 ===
==== 1 to 9 April ====
On 1 April, 43 new cases were announced. The total number of coronavirus cases rose to 239. Health officials reported that over 100 staff members at hospitals in Herat Province are suspected cases.

On the morning of 2 April, six new cases were reported: 5 in Kabul Province and one in Daykundi Province. The total number of cases reached 245. In the evening, the figure reached 273, after 15 new cases were confirmed in Herat Province, as well as another death. The 13 other new cases were located in Baghlan, Kabul, Kandahar and Paktia provinces.

On 3 April, the number of confirmed cases reached 281. 20 new cases were from Herat, 14 in Kabul, and one new case each in the provinces of Ghor, Nangarhar, and Nimroz. In the evening, the Ministry of Public Health announced 299 total cases. Herat Province had 206 cases, whilst Kabul Province had the second-highest number of cases (43). The cases in Herat Province entail 144 men and 60 women, as well as four fatalities and five recoveries. New cases were also reported in Balkh, Ghazni, Logar, and Samangan provinces. The first cases were recorded in Faryab and Kunduz provinces.

On 4 April, the Ministry of Public Health announced that the total had reached 337. The seventh fatality in the country was also reported, whilst two more patients recovered. The 38 new cases were located in 9 provinces. Herat and Kabul had ten new cases each. Kandahar had eight, Paktia had three, Balkh and Samangan had two, whilst Kapisa and Zabul provinces had one new case each. Takhar Province reported their first case. The cases in Herat Province rose to 216, while in Kabul Province it rose to 53 cases.

On 5 April, the Ministry of Public Health confirmed 30 new cases, which brought the total number of cases to 367. Herat had 16 new cases, Kabul had six, Nimruz had three, Faryab and Kunduz both had two, and Daykundi only had one new case. 5 new recoveries were reported, meaning that the total number of recoveries in Afghanistan reached 17.

On 6 April, the death toll increased to 11, as a doctor from a private hospital in Kabul was reported as the eleventh fatality in the country. The Health Ministry also reported the eighteenth recovery. Out of 2737 suspected cases, only 367 had tested positive. However, in the evening it was reported that 27 new cases in Herat Province were recorded from 140 tests. 21 were men, while 6 were women. Overall, 56 new cases were confirmed positive. Kabul had 12 new cases, Kandahar had 10, Balkh had 5, and Nangarhar had 2 new cases confirmed. The total increased to 423.

On 7 April, two new cases were reported in Kandahar Province. On 8 April, the 14th death and 20th recovery were announced. A doctor had died at a clinic in Kabul, which was later closed. The first cases were reported in Helmand and Wardak provinces. On 9 April, 40 new cases were reported, as well as the 15th fatality, and 32 recoveries. 14 new cases were recorded in Nimruz, ten in Kabul, seven in Kandahar, four in Paktia, two each in Balkh and Bamyan (the first cases in the province), and a single new case in Logar Province. With 257 cases, four of the 15 Afghan fatalities had been reported in Herat Province. Despite this, no new cases in Herat Province were recorded on 9 April, due to a lack of testing kits. The Ministry revealed that the deaths recorded up until 9 April entailed four in Balkh and Herat, three in Kabul, two in Nangarhar, and one each in Daykundi and Takhar provinces.

==== 10 to 19 April ====
On 10 April, 37 new cases were tested positive, including the first case in Parwan Province. 16 new cases were recorded in Kabul, Herat had eight, whilst Daykundi, Kandahar, Logar, Takhar all had two new cases. The Ministry of Public Health also announced that Bamiyan had a single new case. By 10 April, at least 20 employees at the Arg (Presidential Palace) had contracted COVID-19 in Kabul.

Another 34 cases were announced by the Ministry of Public Health in the evening. Herat and Kabul both had eight new cases, Kandahar had five, Nimruz and Wardak had four, Balkh had two, whilst Badghis, Baghlan, and Ghor all had a single new case each. The total number of cases reached 555, after an increase of 71 new cases, which was the highest number of cases reported in a single day in Afghanistan. Three new fatalities were also reported, including two men in Kabul.

On 11 April, 52 new cases were recorded, meaning that the total number of cases reached 607. Kabul had 28 new cases, Kandahar had eight, Herat had seven, Balkh had four, Bamyan had two, whilst Helmand, Nangarhar, and Paktia all had a single new case each. On 12 April, three new fatalities were announced by the health ministry, as the number of recoveries reached 38. 58 new cases were recorded across six provinces. Kandahar had 28 new cases, Kabul had 13, Helmand had seven, Nimruz had six, Takhar had three, and Kunduz reported a single case. Herat announced no new case in the province for the second time that week, due to a lack of testing kits. The number of cases in Herat Province reached 280, whilst in Kabul the number of cases had risen to 146. The number of cases in Kandahar had rapidly increased to 75.

On 13 April, 49 new cases were recorded by the health ministry across six provinces. Kabul had 18 new cases, followed by Kandahar with 15, Balkh had six, Ghazni and Herat both had four, and Nangarhar reported two new positive cases. As the number of cases increased to 714, the 40th recovery was also announced, as well as two further deaths, meaning that the death toll had reached 23.

It was reported on 14 April that Surobi District, in Kabul Province, had 31 of Kabul's cases, which included doctors and police officers. On 14 April, 70 new cases were tested positive across 11 provinces. Kabul had 31 new cases, Herat had 22, Ghazni and Kandahar both had three new cases, Nangarhar, Nimruz and Wardak had two cases, whilst Baghlan and Faryab had one new case each. The first two cases were recorded in Kunar Province, as well as the first case in Urozgan Province. In Herat, the number of cases had increased to 306. The number of cases in Kabul had reached 209, with 11 recoveries and six fatalities. The total number of cases in the country reached 784, with 43 recoveries and 25 deaths. On 15 April, 56 new cases were recorded, meaning that the number of cases increased to 840. 37 new cases were reported in Kabul. 11 new recoveries and 5 fatalities were announced by the health ministry.

On 16 April, the Ministry of Public Health announced 66 new cases from 465 tests, as well as 45 new recoveries. The total number of cases reached 906, whilst the number of recoveries increased to 99. Kabul had 26 new cases, Kandahar had 15, Balkh had six, Herat and Kunduz both had five, Helmand had four, and Kunar and Nangarhar both had one case each. The first three cases were recorded in Laghman Province. Herat had 43 of the new recoveries, whilst Ghor and Kandahar had one new recovery each.

On 17 April, the health ministry recorded 27 new cases and 13 new recoveries. Kabul had 12 new cases, Paktia had seven, Logar had four, Herat had two, whilst Bamyan and Daykundi had one new case each. On 18 April, a 65-year-old man became the sixth fatality in Balkh, as well as the 31st fatality overall in Afghanistan, as the health ministry reported that three patients had died in the past 24 hours. 63 new cases were recorded in eight provinces, including the first case in Jowzjan Province. Kabul had 31 new cases, Balkh had 16, Kunar had six, Herat had four, and Baghlan had three. Faryab and Laghman reported one new case each. Two other fatalities were recorded that day, including the owner of a private hospital in Kabul and a surgeon in Jowzjan, as well as 15 new recoveries. The total number of recoveries reached 131, as the number of cases increased to 996. On 19 April, three more fatalities were recorded, with two in Kabul and one in Kandahar. 35 new cases were confirmed by the health ministry, meaning that the total number of cases reached 1,031. Kabul had 15 new cases, Laghman had nine, Herat has six, Kunar had four, and Nangarhar reported a single new case. By 19 April, 110 health workers (90 men and 20 women) had tested positive and four had died. The number of recoveries increased to 135. The number of COVID-19 cases in the Arg had doubled to 40.

==== 20 to 30 April ====
On 20 April, 66 new cases were confirmed from 311 tests. Kabul reported 52 new cases, Laghman had five, Baghlan and Nangarhar had four, and Paktia had one new case. 15 new recoveries were also recorded. The number of cases reached 1,092, as the number of recoveries reached 150. On 21 April, 84 new cases were confirmed by the health ministry. Kabul had 28 new cases, Kandahar had 22, Nangarhar had six, Nimruz had five, Helmand and Kapisa had four, Herat and Kunar had three, Ghazni and Zabul had two, whilst Bamyan, Farah, Laghman, Paktia and Parwan all recorded a single new case. The number of fatalities reached 40, as the number of recoveries reached 166.

On 22 April, two new fatalities were announced, as well as 14 new recoveries. The health ministry confirmed 106 new cases. Kandahar had 53 new cases, Herat had 21, Kunduz had 15, Jowzjan had 10, Kabul and Nangarhar had six, Nimruz had five, Kapisa and Logar had four, Kunar and Paktia had three, Ghazni had two, whilst Parwan and Takhar recorded a single new case. Paktika and Panjshir provinces recorded their first two cases.

On 23 April, 63 new cases were confirmed. Out of 95 cases (including some from the previous evening), Kandahar had 53 new cases, Balkh had 21, Kabul had 11, Takhar had 10, Nangarhar and Panjshir had five in Nangarhar, Herat had three, Farah had two, whilst Daykundi, Laghman, Nimruz and Parwan recorded a single case each. Five recoveries in Herat and four recoveries in Kandahar were announced by the health ministry. The total number of recovered cases reached 188. A new fatality was recorded in Kandahar, as the total number of deaths in Afghanistan increased to 43. In the evening, Balkh announced 21 new cases and a single new case in Nimruz. A suspected patient in Kabul died before he was tested positive.

On 24 April, 112 new cases were reported by the health ministry. Out of 133 cases (with some from the previous evening), Herat had 25, Balkh had 21, Kandahar had 20, Kabul and Paktia had 16, Nimruz and Samangan had seven, Kapisa, Logar and Zabul had three, Bamyan, Ghor and Urozgan had two, whilst Baghlan, Helmand, Parwan and Wardak all recorded a single new case. Four new fatalities were also reported over 24 hours. One of them was Assadullah Fazli, who had previously served as the head of the Kunar public health directorate. The number of recoveries had reached 206. On 25 April, the number of fatalities increased to 50. Out of three new fatalities, two were in Ghazni and one was in Herat. 68 of 242 tests were positive. Ghazni had 13, Paktia had 11, Paktika had nine, Balkh had eight, Badghis and Kabul had six, Herat and Nangarhar had four, Khost and Laghman had three, and one case was recorded in Baghlan. The number of recoveries had reached 207.

On 26 April, 172 new cases were tested positive from 600 samples across 18 provinces. Balkh had 34, Herat had 33, Kabul had 27, Kandahar had 21, Baghlan and Paktia had eight, Kunduz had seven, Ghor and Sar e-Pol had five, Faryab, Nimruz and Samangan had four, Khost, Laghman and Nangarhar had three, Helmand had two, whilst Paktika and Panjshir recorded a single new case each. Seven new fatalities were confirmed by the health ministry. The number of recoveries reached 220. On 27 April, 125 new cases were tested positive from 361 samples across 18 provinces. Herat had 21, Kabul had 15, Balkh had 10, Logar had nine, Jowzjan had eight, Lagman, Paktia and Panjshir had seven, Ghazni and Takhar had six, Nangarhar had five, Helmand, Kunar and Wardak had two, whilst Badakhshan, Badghis and Kapisa recorded a single new case each. One new fatality was reported. The number of recoveries reached 228.

On 28 April, 111 new cases were tested positive. The number of confirmed cases reached 1,939. The number of fatalities reached 60, as the number of recoveries reached 252. On 29 April, 232 cases were tested positive from 581 samples across 23 provinces. The number of confirmed cases reached 2,171. Kandahar had 45, Balkh had 41, Kabul had 20, Ghazni had 12, Logar and Paktia had 10, Panjshir and Samangan had nine, Takhar had eight, Kunduz had seven, Baghlan and Nangarhar had five, Badghis and Wardak had four, Laghman had three, Paktika and Parwan had two, whist Faryab and Sar e-Pol recorded a single new case each. Four new fatalities were reported, with two in Herat and one in Kabul. The number of recoveries reached 260.

On 30 April, 164 new cases were tested positive. The number of cases increased to 2,335. 50 new recoveries and four new fatalities were announced by the health ministry. The number of recoveries reached 310. 228 health workers had been infected.

=== May 2020 ===
==== 1 to 9 May ====
On 1 May, the health ministry reported 179 new cases from 591 samples across 12 provinces, bringing the total to 2,469. The number of recoveries reached 331 as the death toll reached 72. 249 health workers had been infected.

On 2 May, the health ministry announced 235 new cases. The number of recoveries reached 345. 13 new fatalities were recorded across Afghanistan, meaning that the death toll reached 85.

On 3 May, the health ministry announced 190 new cases. Five new fatalities were recorded, which included two in Paktia. Herat, Kabul and Wardak reported a single new fatality each. The death toll reached 90 as the number of recoveries reached 397.

On 4 May, the health ministry announced 330 new cases, which is the highest number of cases reported in a single day in Afghanistan. Five new fatalities were recorded, which included two in Logar. Baghlan, Laghman and Nangarhar reported a single new fatality each. The death toll reached 95 as the number of recoveries reached 421.

On 5 May, the health ministry announced 31 new recoveries and nine fatalities. The first case was recorded in Nuristan Province, the last province to report a COVID-19 case. The number of recoveries reached 458 as the death toll reached 104.

On 7 May, it was reported that the health minister, Dr. Ferozuddin Feroz, had tested positive and was isolating at home. The health ministry reported 215 new cases. Four new recoveries were recorded in Herat. Two fatalities were reported.

On 8 May, the health ministry reported 253 new cases from 520 samples. 29 new recoveries and six new fatalities were reported. The death toll reached 115, as the total recoveries reached 502.

On 9 May, the health ministry reported 361 new cases. Six prisoners had been infected in Nangarhar. Four new fatalities were reported, bringing the death toll to 120. 65 patients were discharged after fully recovering.

==== 10 to 19 May ====
On 10 May, the health ministry reported 285 new cases. 161 people tested positive from 365 tests in Kabul. Deputy Minister of Health, Wahid Majrooh, announced that only a certain number of patients had been admitted to the center at Darul Aman Palace for various reasons, which included security issues. Majrooh also announced that the threat of the COVID-19 pandemic in Afghanistan was still high. Two new fatalities were recorded. 16 new recoveries were recorded.

On 11 May, the health ministry reported 281 new cases, bringing the total number of cases to 4,963. Five new fatalities were recorded. The death toll reached 127, as the number of recoveries increased to 610.

On 12 May, the health ministry reported 259 new cases from 619 tests, bringing the total to 5,226. Five new fatalities were recorded. The death toll reached 132, as the number of recoveries reached 648.

On 13 May, the health ministry reported 413 new cases from 1,008 tests, bringing the total to 5,639. Four new fatalities were recorded. The death toll reached 136, as the number of recoveries reached 691. By 13 May, 19,732 tests had been carried out.

On 14 May, the health ministry reported 414 new cases from 1,122 tests, bringing the total to 6,053. 17 new fatalities were recorded. The death toll reached 153, as the number of recoveries increased to 745.

On 15 May, the health ministry reported 349 new cases, bringing the total to 6,402. 15 new fatalities and 32 new recoveries were recorded. The death toll reached 168, as the number of recoveries reached 745.

On 16 May, 262 new positive cases were announced, bringing the total positive cases to 6,664. Two fatalities and seven recoveries were recorded. The death toll reached 169, as the number of recoveries reached 784. On 16 May, doctors at Pul-e-Charki prison and the Kabul detention center announced that 50 prisoners and staff had tested positive from 600 suspected cases.

On 17 May, 408 new positive cases were announced, bringing the total to 7,072. Three fatalities and 23 recoveries were recorded. The death toll reached 173, as the number of recoveries increased to 801.

On 18 May, 581 new positive cases were announced, bringing the total to 7,653. Five fatalities and 45 recoveries were reported. The death toll reached 178, as the number of recoveries reached 850.

On 19 May, 492 new positive cases were announced, bringing the total to 8,145. 10 fatalities and 80 recoveries were recorded. The death toll reached 187, as the number of recoveries reached 930.

==== 20 to 31 May ====
On 20 May, 531 new positive cases were announced, bringing the total to 8,676. Six fatalities and eight recoveries were reported. The death toll reached 938, as the number of recoveries reached 938.

On 21 May, 542 new positive cases were announced, bringing the total to 9,216. 12 fatalities and 58 recoveries were reported. The death toll reached 205, as the number of recoveries reached 993.

On 22 May, 782 new positive cases were announced, bringing the total to 9,998. 11 fatalities and 44 recoveries were reported. The death toll reached 216, as the number of recoveries reached 1,040.

On 25 May, 658 new positive cases were announced, bringing the total to 11,831. One new fatality was recorded, taking the death toll to 220. 31 new recoveries were recorded in Balkh. The number of recoveries increased to 1,128.

On 26 May, 625 new positive cases were announced, bringing the total to 12,456. The death toll reached 227, as the number of recoveries reached 1,138.

On 27 May, 580 new positive cases were announced, bringing the total to 13,036. The death toll reached 235, as the number of recoveries reached 1,209.

On 28 May, 623 new positive cases were announced from 985 tests, bringing the total to 13,659. 11 fatalities were reported. 50 new recoveries were announced.

On 29 May, 866 new positive cases were announced from 1,425 tests. 16 provinces reported new cases. 44 recoveries and three fatalities were recorded.

On 30 May, 680 new positive caes were announced from 1,112 tests. 25 recoveries and eight fatalities were recorded. The death toll reached 257, as the number of recoveries reached 1,328.

On 31 May, 545 new positive cases were announced from 1,168 tests, bringing the total to 15,750. 100 recoveries and eight fatalities were recorded. The number of new cases in Kabul decreased for the first time in two weeks.

=== June 2020 ===
==== 1 to 9 June ====
On 1 June, 759 new positive cases were announced, bringing the total to 16,509. Five fatalities and 22 recoveries were reported. The death toll reached 270, as the number of recoveries reached 1,450.

On 2 June, 758 new positive cases were announced from 1,323 tests, bringing the total to 17,267. 78 recoveries and 24 fatalities were recorded. The death toll reached 270, as the number of recoveries reached 1,450.

On 3 June, Ariana News reported that government officials were not following social distancing guidelines during meetings. They also reported that only some fatalities were officially recorded, as some COVID-19 positive and suspicious deaths were not reported. In Kunduz Province, local officials announced that Fahim Qarluq, the district governor of Qalay-i-Zal and the provincial police chief, General Rashid Bashir, had died of COVID-19.

==== 20 to 30 June ====
On 22 June, Pajhwok Afghan News announced that 32 ventilators were smuggled to Pakistan. On 26 June, Afghan actor Faqir Nabi died of COVID-19 in a hospital in Kabul.

=== July 2020 ===
On 3 July, Afghan President Ashraf Ghani's special envoy on economic and trade development, Mohammad Yousef Ghazanfar, died from COVID-19 making him the most senior Afghan official known to have died from the disease.

=== August 2020 ===
On 2 August, one case was confirmed from 19 tests. Officials said a lower number of people were tested during Eid al-Adha. The number of total cases was 36,710. The death toll reached 1,284, as the total recoveries reached 25,509.

On 5 August, an official survey conducted in Afghanistan reported that approximately a third of the country's population, or roughly 10 million people had contracted COVID-19. The Ministry of Public Health announced that the survey was based on antibody tests with technical support from the World Health Organisation. 11,500 people from all 34 provinces participated in the survey.

=== September 2020 ===
On 19 September, Ahmad Jawad Osmani, the Acting Minister of Public Health, said that the Ministry of Health has got enough financial resources to tackle a second wave of infections, after visiting Herat.

=== October 2020 ===
On 13 October, Abdul Hakim Tamanna, Head of the Herat Health Department, reported that 156 students and teachers in Herat Province had tested positive in the past week from 386 tests. He said that 35 to 60 students learn in a single room due to a lack of facilities and the failure to heed social distancing guidelines.

=== November 2020 ===
On 29 November, Public Health Acting Minister Jawad Osmani warned of a second wave of COVID-19 infections in Afghanistan. Osmani stated that around 1240 people had been infected within the past week. The infections had increased by 10 percent and the fatalities had increased by 3 percent.

=== December 2020 ===
According to the Public Health Ministry, as of 19 December, there has been a total of 50,536 cases in the country. Of those, a third were in Kabul. However, due to the lack of easily-accessible testing facilities, the Ministry estimated the actual number of positive cases to be much higher.

=== January 2021 ===
On 4 January 2021, the health ministry called on the public to limit their travels over the next four weeks. On 25 January, Tahir Qadiry announced that 500,000 vaccines would be given to Afghanistan from India. On 27 January, it was announced by the Ministry of Public Health that Afghanistan received $112 million from the World Health Organization's COVAX program, which covers 20 per cent of the population.

=== February 2021 ===
On 7 February, the Government of Afghanistan announced plans to vaccinate 60 percent of the population as the first 500,000 doses of COVID-19 vaccine arrived in Kabul from India. 150,000 health workers will be vaccinated first, followed by adults with health problems. On 23 February, Afghanistan officially launched its coronavirus vaccination program at the Arg.

=== March 2021 ===
By 1 March, at least 8,200 health workers had been vaccinated against COVID-19 in Afghanistan. On 8 March, Afghanistan received 468,000 COVID-19 vaccine doses from COVAX. On 30 March 2021, seven people were found to be infected with a SARS-CoV-2 variant similar to the one circulating in the UK at the time.

=== April 2021 ===
By 7 April, 100,000 people in Afghanistan had received their COVID-19 vaccination.

=== May 2021 ===
In May, Afghanistan entered the third wave of the COVID-19 pandemic.

=== June 2021 ===
On 12 June, UNAMA announced that an additional 468,000 doses of the AstraZeneca will be provided to Afghanistan.

=== July 2021 ===
UNDARK reported that the Afghanistan conflict "hindered the country's Covid response", especially in Kandahar.

=== August 2021 ===
According to a report by Shamshad News, the Taliban banned use of COVID-19 vaccines in the Paktia regional hospital.

Following the Fall of Kabul on 15 August the WHO feared a potential "rapid and uncontrolled spread of COVID-19". The week after the fall of Kabul, COVID-19 tests decreased by 77% and COVID-19 vaccinations decreased by 80% compared to the week before.

=== September 2021 ===
On 3 September, Suhail Shaheen, a spokesman for the Taliban, stated that China will "increase its humanitarian assistance, especially for treatment of COVID-19".

On 20 September 2021, The Global Fund to Fight AIDS, Tuberculosis and Malaria and United Nations Development Programme reached an agreement to provide $15 million USD to prevent the collapse of Afghanistan's health system, paying for medicines, health supplies, and healthcare workers' salaries.

=== October 2021 ===
Starting from 9 October, Taliban officials and United States of America representatives held talks in Doha, Qatar. According to Afghanistan's acting foreign minister Mullah Amir Khan Muttaqi, the US would offer COVID-19 vaccines to the Afghan people.

As of 30 October, nearly 40,000 people in Afghanistan received COVID-19 vaccines per day.

=== December 2021 ===
On 3 December, the Afghan Ministry of Public Health (MoPH) stated that there were no cases of the SARS-CoV-2 Omicron variant so far in Afghanistan.

On 8 December, about 800,000 doses of COVID-19 vaccine arrived in Afghanistan, with 200,000 to arrive the next day. Chinese Ambassador to Afghanistan Wang Yu also said that China has "announced another three million doses of vaccine to Afghanistan".

On 11 December, India sent "1.6 metric tonne of life-saving medicines" to Afghanistan, the first assistance it gave since the fall of Kabul.

Abdul Bari Omar, the Afghan deputy minister of health services, said that pregnant women and children could take COVID-19 vaccines.

== Other cases ==
Pakistan identified two positive cases at the Torkham border, on 12 March 2020. It was reported that one Afghan citizen with coronavirus was returned from Torkham to Afghanistan. The second case at the border was a Pakistani embassy employee from Kabul. On 15 March, Pakistan deported 10 Afghans at Torkham after they developed flu-like symptoms.

On 24 March 2020, the Resolute Support Mission reported that 4 coalition service members had tested positive. Also on 24 March, a 51-year-old Afghan national in Medina, Saudi Arabia was announced as the first casualty from the coronavirus in that country. The Afghan had died on 23 March.

== Prevention measures ==
=== Testing and health facilities ===
==== March 2020 ====
Up until 10 March, the Afghan government had spent $15 million in response to the outbreak and a total of 142 suspected cases had been tested, with only five being positive for COVID-19. Tests were sent to the Netherlands to ensure testing accuracy. Isolation centers were also set up across the country. Up until 14 March, the Afghan government had spent $25 million to tackle the outbreak, which included $7 million of aid packages. A total of 50,000 testing kits had been supplied by the Afghan government. On 14 March, the Ministry of Public Health had tested 181 suspected cases. The samples of the suspected cases were from Herat, Samangan, Kapisa, Balkh, Daykundi, Parwan and Paktia provinces. By 18 March, the Ministry of Public Health had registered at least 340 suspected cases of coronavirus in 23 provinces of the country since the start of the outbreak. On 18 March, the government had set up five quarantine centers in Herat and Nimruz.

On 20 March, the Ministry of Public Health said that no private labs or hospitals are allowed to undertake the checking of suspected or positive patients. The Ministry of Public Health announced that they intended to increase the capacity of laboratories for testing coronavirus samples in Herat and Balkh provinces. it was announced that a new laboratory in Herat is under construction, after the only laboratory in the country was in Kabul, meaning that it took longer to diagnose people who took tests. The Health Ministry later restricted the policy on testing, testing only people with a high fever. It was reported that returnees from Iran had visited the Afghan-Japan Communicable Disease Hospital, which treats COVID-19 patients in Kabul, but were not tested. By 27 March, only 600 tests on returnees from Iran had been carried out. The Ministry reported that in total, over 1000 tests had been carried out by 28 March.

On 30 March, the Minister of Public Health, Ferozuddin Feroz, announced the plan to increase the capacity of health facilities in Afghanistan to 1000 tests a day by the end of the week. A center previously used to treat animals is operating as a testing facility, performing around 100 tests in 24 hours. By the end of March 2020, Afghanistan's COVID-19 testing centers had the capacity of 600 tests a day. 400 of them were in Kabul, 100 in Herat, and 100 in Nangarhar.

==== April 2020 ====
On 4 April, the Ministry of Public Health opened a testing center in Mazar-i-Sharif, Balkh Province, with the capacity of testing 30 cases a day. The capacity of the center was expected to increase to 200 cases per day within a week. Also on that day, a 300-bed temporary hospital was opened in Herat Province, designated for COVID-19 patients. A local businessman had decided to convert a hotel into a hospital and treatment center for COVID-19 patients. The new hospital is the second center for COVID-19 patients in the province and the capacity of the new hospital will increase to 1000 beds, if needed. Suspected cases in Herat Province will also be admitted to the hospital. Around 200 doctors and nurses were hired at the hospital and received training on the COVID-19 treatment. On 7 April, a testing facility in Kandahar opened, which also caters for the provinces of Helmand, Urozgan, and Zabul. On 8 April, the Ministry of Public Health announced that there are only 300 ventilators in Afghanistan.

On 12 April, it was announced at the new testing center in Herat, that testing was suspended for twice in a week due to a lack of kits, resulting in no new cases reported from Herat on 9 and 12 April. The new testing facility only has the capacity of 140 tests a day and has to cater for Badghis, Farah, Ghor, and Nimruz provinces. Meanwhile, in Balkh, a new hospital was opened in Mazar-i-Sharif, which can treat up to 200 patients. Despite this, there are only 15 ventilators. This is the sixth COVID-19 designated hospital after two in Herat and Kabul, and another one in Nangarhar. In contrast to Herat's testing capacity, the testing facility in Balkh has a capacity of 50 tests a day. In Kandahar Province, there is also a 350-bed hospital in the Aino Mena district of Kandahar.

On 15 April, it was reported in Herat, that around 40 patients were reported to be at hospital, meaning that around 260 patients were isolated at home at their own request. The patients in isolation are still in contact with doctors. On 16 April, the Afghan-Japan Hospital in Kabul stopped accepting samples for COVID-19 testing for two days, due to a surge in requests, despite having the capacity to test 300 samples a day. It was reported that some people had waited for results for almost two weeks. On 18 April, it was reported that there was a lack of testing kits in Balkh, which led to a stop in testing. On 17 April, Balkh's testing centers announced that they needed health equipment for doctors. It was also announced that there was a lack of RNA testing kits, but the World Health Organization (WHO) had some supplied testing kits for Afghanistan. An opening ceremony was held at Darul Aman Palace, where a new COVID-19 isolation and treatment center has 200 beds. Due to 30 suspected deaths in Surobi District, Kabul Province, a new treatment facility with 20 beds was built. By 18 April, the Government of Afghanistan had given $15 million to the Ministry of Public Health (MoPH), after the $100 million from the World Bank had not arrived at this point. The plan for an isolation center with 10,000 beds was announced, as well as an overall 100,000 beds across centers in Afghanistan. Up until 18 April, 5,800 samples had been tested.

By 20 April, over 6,000 tests had been carried out. On 20 April, 5,000 new testing kits arrived in Afghanistan. It was also reported that 11 of the 16 RNA testing kits had been used. By 21 April, around 5,300 tests had been carried out. By 24 April, 7,425 samples had been tested. The health ministry announced that the problem with the RNA testing kits had been resolved. By 25 April, 8,090 tests had been carried out. By 26 April, there were testing centers in 22 police districts in Kabul run by volunteer health workers. 8,694 tests had been carried out. On 27 April, the government approved the purchase of 500 new ventilators, as well as a $4 million funding for the construction and renovation of COVID-19 facilities. $164 million was spent altogether, which also included testing kits. By 27 April, 9,000 tests had been carried out. By 29 April, 10,022 tests had been carried out. PCR testing started at the Afghan-Japan hospital in Kabul. By 30 April, 10,593 tests had been carried out.

==== May 2020 ====
By 1 May, 11,068 tests had been carried out. By 4 May, 13,076 tests had been carried out. By 5 May, 13,777 tests had been carried out. By 7 May, 15,000 tests had been carried out. In May 2020, it was reported that a pediatric ward was opened as an isolation center in a hospital that was destroyed in 2019 by the Taliban in Zabul Province. On 8 May, the health ministry announced that there was 3,230 available beds across all 34 provinces. By 8 May, 15,560 tests had been carried out. By 11 May, 18,098 tests had been carried out. By 12 May, 18,724 tests had been carried out. On 14 May, the health ministry announced that the testing capacity had been increased to 1,100 test a day. By 14 May, 20,854 tests had been carried out. By 15 May, 21,969 tests had been carried out. As the number of prisoners and staff at Pul-e-Charki prison in Kabul reached, doctors announced that the 250-bed quarantine center would be expanded to 1,000 beds if there were more cases. By 16 May, 22,639 tests had been carried out. By 17 May, 23,497 tests had been carried out. By 18 May, 24,697 tests had been carried out. By 19 May, 25,700 tests had been carried out. By 20 May, 26,707 tests had been carried out. By 21 May, 27,889 tests had been carried out. By 22 May, 29,417 tests had been carried out. By 25 May, 32,870 tests had been carried out. By 26 May, 33,864 tests had been carried out.

By 27 May, 34,936 tests had been carried out. The health ministry announced that it was running out of medical supplies. By 28 May, 35,921 tests had been carried out. By 29 May, 37,348 tests had been carried out. By 30 May, 38,460 tests had been carried out. By 31 May, 39,628 tests had been carried out. On 31 May, President Ashraf Ghani appointed Ahmad Jawad Osmani as the acting minister of public health, replacing Ferozuddin Feroz.

==== June 2020 ====
On 1 June, the International Rescue Committee (IRC) announced that Afghanistan was facing a humanitarian disaster as the number of cases rose by 684% in May. The health ministry announced that they had the capacity to test 2,000 samples a day, despite receiving between 10,000 and 20,000 samples per day. By 1 June, 40,950 tests had been carried out. By 2 June, 42,273 tests had been carried out. On 3 June, 13 doctors resigned from the "Covid-1" hospital in Herat that was treating more than 100 COVID-19 patients. On 4 June, Ahmad Jawad Osmani announced reforms in the health sector. 570 health workers had been infected in Herat Province. On 16 June, testing stopped in Herat and Balkh due to a lack of equipment. In Kabul, health workers said that 22 mobile testing centers were facing a lack of kits. Private hospitals began charging for tests and sent samples to government laboratories.

On 22 June, it was reported that 40 of the 314 ventilators in Afghan public hospitals were not functional. On 28 June, patients at government hospitals claimed a shortage of oxygen, which was rejected by officials.

==== July 2020 ====
On 31 July 2020, the Special Inspector General for Afghanistan Reconstruction said that an additional eight million Afghans will fall into poverty due to the pandemic, exacerbating the poverty rate from 55 percent to 80 percent. This increase will likely overwhelm the country's medical care system and cause food shortages according to the report.

=== Lockdown measures ===
On 14 March, President Ashraf Ghani, told the public to avoid large public gatherings and to pay attention to hygiene to prevent the spread of the disease. On 18 March, the Ministry of Interior Affairs banned all large gatherings, including the closure of venues that attract large crowds such as entertainment places, sports grounds, swimming pools, fitness clubs and wedding halls.

On 22 March, Public Health Minister Ferozuddin Feroz urged the government to order the lockdown of the city of Herat at a press conference in Kabul. Members of the Wolesi Jirga of Afghanistan's parliament decided to hold a general session once a week to avoid the spread of COVID-19. The spokesperson of the Health Ministry, Wahidullah Mayar, announced that 449 suspected cases had been tested across 28 provinces up until 22 March. Most suspected cases were from Herat and Kabul.

On 24 March, in Jalalabad, Nangarhar Province, the local authorities placed strict measures in the provincial capital, limiting the movement of citizens until 1 April. On 25 March, the Afghan Government began to limit the movement of residents in Farah, Herat and Nimruz provinces, after Herat emerged as a major source of internal transmissions in Afghanistan. In Herat, praying in mosques was suspended to prevent any possible spread of the virus. Residents of Farah and Zaranj could only go out for necessary activities.

On 26 March, the government announced the release of 10,000 prisoners that were aged over 55 to slow the spread of COVID-19 in the country. This also consisted of mainly women, youths and the critically ill. Based on President Ashraf Ghani's decree, the prisoners would be released over the 10 following days. The release of prisoners did not include members of Islamist militant groups. Also on that day, Afghan authorities extended the lockdown to Kabul, Kandahar, and Logar provinces. Also on 26 March, the mayor of Mazar-i-Sharif said that in addition to closing restaurants in the city, disinfection of public places is also taking place.

On 27 March, it was announced that the Afghan cabinet had decided that the capital of Afghanistan, Kabul, would undergo lockdown from 28 March for three weeks. The lockdown will ensure that residents stay at home, avoiding all non-essential travel and gatherings. Residents would also need to provide valid reasons if they decide to leave their homes. All restaurants, hotels, sauna, cafes, public bathing centers, shrines, gyms, parks and other stores will remain closed for 3 weeks, except for grocery stores and banks. It was also announced that all sport venues, shrines and other public gathering places would remain closed for the duration of lockdown in Kabul. Public transport carrying more than 5 passengers will also be banned. Large educational institutes and wedding halls will be transformed into isolation centers to quarantine those who return from Iran for two weeks. A total of 70 military teams will patrol Kabul to identify people with symptoms. On 4 April, officials from Balkh Province reported that Mazar-i-Sharif is under partial lockdown as public places were closed.

By 9 April, over 1,500 police officers had been deployed in Kabul. The lockdown measures in Kabul Province were made stricter on 12 April. All main highways were closed, as the lockdown was extended for a further two weeks. The Ministry of Interior Affairs announced that there would be consequences for anyone that violates the lockdown. On 17 April, the lockdown in Kabul Province was extended by three weeks until 9 May. On 10 May, Balkh eased the lockdown in Mazar-i-Sharif. On 21 May, the lockdown in Kabul was eased. On 22 May, President Ashraf Ghani announced that Kabul would ease restrictions on business and travel after Eid al-Fitr holidays.

=== International funding and local aid ===
==== International ====
On 14 March 2020, Beijing (China) announced that they would give aid to Afghanistan. The World Bank, Asian Development Bank and World Health Organization also announced that they would provide help. The Chinese medical aid arrived on 2 April, after aid from the United Arab Emirates was received on the previous day. However, it was reported later that the quality of the medical equipment from China was not up to standard and put Afghanistan's Coronavirus fight at risk.
It was also announced on that day that Uzbekistan would provide aid for five of the northern provinces of Afghanistan. On 20 April, Turkey sent aid to Afghanistan. On 23 April, a second shipment of medical equipment arrived from China.

On 21 March 2020, Afghanistan contributed $1 million to the South Asian Association for Regional Cooperation (SAARC) emergency fund to help fight COVID-19. On 3 April, the World Bank approved $100.4 million of aid to help Afghanistan. In April 2020, the European Union (EU) announced that they would provide technical support and €117 million for Afghanistan. On 6 May, a Qatari foundation (Algharrafa Foundation) and a group of Afghan investors from China sent medical equipment worth over $2 million. Algharrafa provided £1 million aid and announced that they would build a hospital in Farah Province. Altogether, the Afghan investors have given $3 million aid, which includes previous aid packages sent. On 8 May, the World Bank approved a $400 million grant for Afghanistan. Kayehan Foundation, based in the Netherlands, sent 200 sets of PPE, masks and 10 medical machines to Jamhuriat Hospital in Kabul.

Since early May 2020, the Taliban have not allowed six food aid trucks from Turkmenistan in Tagab District, which was expected to arrive at Maymana, Faryab Province.

==== Local ====
During the lockdown in Kabul, the Ministry of Agriculture, Irrigation, and Livestock donated food for an emergency group to distribute across the province. In April 2020, Amanullah Kaliwal began to distribute 500 masks a day to the poor for free, which had been sewn at home. In less than a week, 4000 masks had been distributed to the poor in Kabul. On 23 April, it was reported that in western Kabul medical workers had begun volunteering by distributing food and equipment (such as gloves) to poor families. They also provided counseling advice and disinfected roads. During the lockdown, bread was given for free at bakeries across Afghanistan.

=== Public awareness campaigns ===
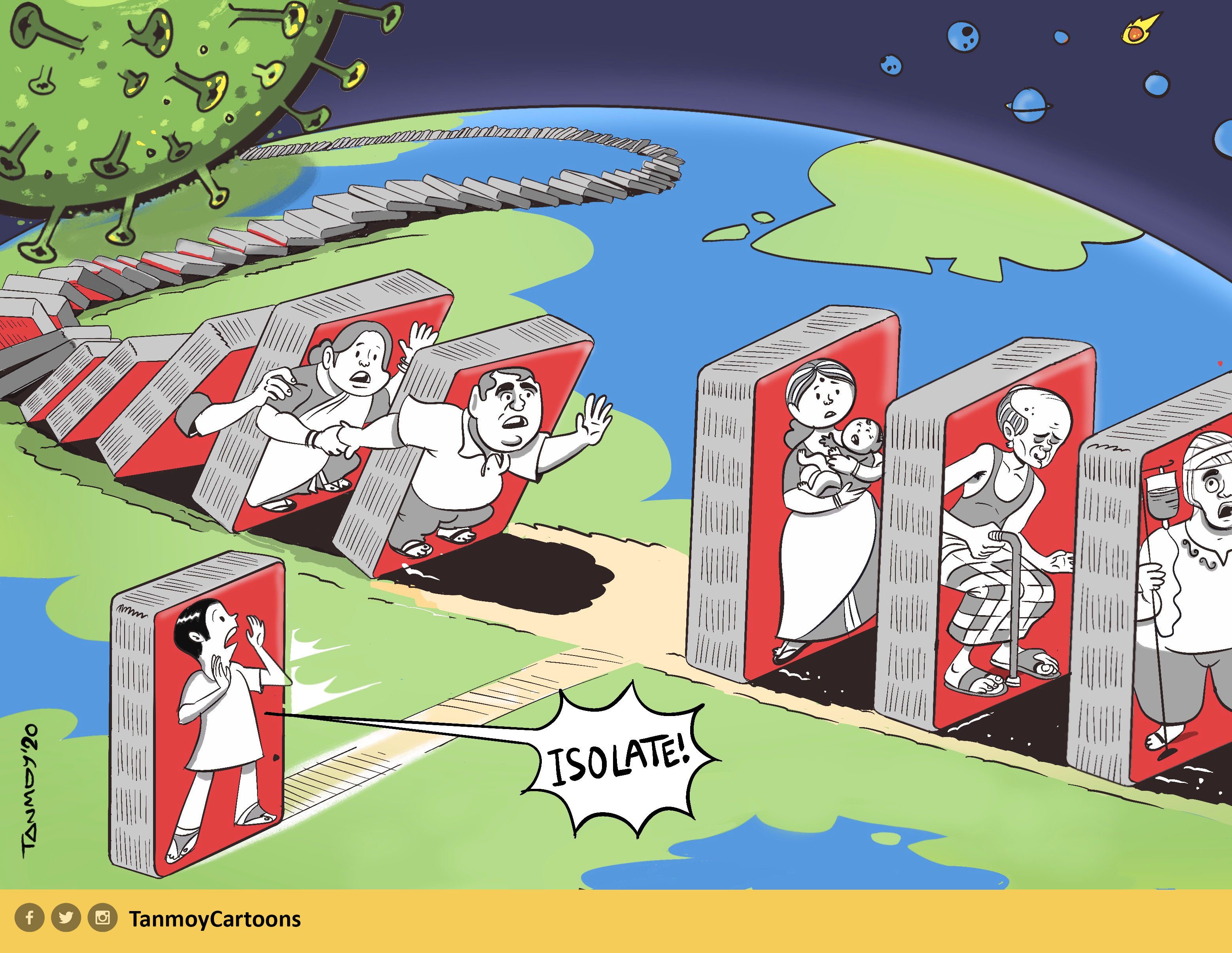
A cartoon demonstrating how social distancing reduces the rate of COVID-19 transmission and stop it before it can become an outbreak. To save loved ones and oneself, every citizen should follow it with enthusiasm and make oneself self-isolate.

On 22 March 2020, doctors at Blossom Hospital in Kabul launched a public awareness campaign to help the public understand how to prevent the spread of the virus. This included distributing over 5000 surgical masks to the public.

On 23 March 2020, Cordaid announced that they would distribute soap in communities, handle waste management and supply thermometers to reduce the risk of spread in Afghanistan. They also held community awareness sessions and helped to improve the referral systems of patients to health centers that have a treatment ward for COVID-19.

Clerics and religious scholars enforced a fatwa on 5 April 2020. It was reported on 6 April, that many volunteer groups and community health workers had begun awareness campaigns, such as a door-to-door campaign by a group of women in Parwan Province and a provincial campaign for Faryab Province by local officials. The Ministry of Public Health also began to spread awareness via social media and traditional media. On 12 April, it was announced that a group under the name, Voice of the pulpit and the doctor, would launch a public awareness campaign in Kabul. The group consists of doctors and religious scholars.

==== Food distribution and disinfection by Bayat Group ====
On 14 April 2020, Bayat Group, one of the largest private companies in Afghanistan, launched the Stop The Virus (STV) campaign. The campaign also includes the disinfection of cities. The group also began to distribute food in Herat. By 16 April, the government had spent 27 million afs on awareness campaigns. During Ramandan, they distributed food packages in Khost Province and Maymanah, Faryab. On 8 May, Bayat Group and Afghan Wireless Communication Company (AWCC) disinfected areas of Kabul with the health ministry. On 16 May, they distributed food packages to needy families in Daykundi. On 18 May, they distributed food to needy families in Badakhshan. On 19 May, Bayat Group and AWCC disinfected more areas of Kabul and the Children's Health Hospital.

=== Taliban's cooperation ===
On 16 March 2020, the Taliban announced that in Balkh Province, they arrested the runaway patient who tested positive for coronavirus and handed him back to health authorities. The Taliban also spread awareness of the coronavirus in insurgent-controlled areas of Afghanistan and supported governmental health workers. They also asked for Afghan returnees from Iran to be tested for COVID-19.

On 27 March 2020, the Taliban started a public awareness campaign in Jowzjan Province. On 29 March, the Taliban launched a COVID-19 public awareness campaign in Logar Province. The Taliban offered safe passage to health workers that are treating coronavirus patients in Afghanistan. Furthermore, the Taliban enforced lockdowns in affected districts. People who were suspected of having COVID-19 were quarantined.

=== Mask and PPE production ===
On 26 February 2020, a mask-production plant in Herat Province (the epicenter of the outbreak in Afghanistan) opened. The plant produces over 60,000 masks on a daily basis. The Ministry of Public Health announced that this would be important in slowing the spread of COVID-19 and would also help decrease the surge in prices for surgical masks. On 14 April, a factory opened in Kabul, which is the first in Afghanistan that produces personal protective equipment (PPE). It produces 10,000 masks per day.

=== Facemasks Usage at Healthcare Settings ===
The general ministry of public health's policy indicates that during the COVID-19 outbreak wearing a mask has been mandatory in public spaces in Afghanistan since 2020. However, political turmoils, poverty, and the recent withdrawal of support from the United States and other international allies make it impossible for many Afghans to adhere to the country's health rules and regulations.

Remarkably, private and government hospitals tend to have distinctive approaches to facemask usage. Some private hospitals aiming to please their affluent visitors do not have strict rules about facemask usage and do not prevent those not wearing masks from entering the hospital premises. On the contrary, governmental hospitals generally provide free healthcare, mainly to poor people who cannot afford to use private hospitals. So, it is reasonable to suggest that the poor group of Afghans who visit government hospitals may not be able to afford to be compliant with preventive practices such as mask-wearing due to poverty.

A study found that while 71% of all participants adhered to wearing facemasks, 94% of these users wore surgical masks, and 86% wore all types of facemasks correctly. Gender plays a role in mask-wearing. While women have a higher adherence rate to wearing facemasks than men, gender socialization of women and girls to wear the niqab or hijab interacts with their adherence to wearing facemasks.

== Impacts ==
=== Cultural events and religion ===
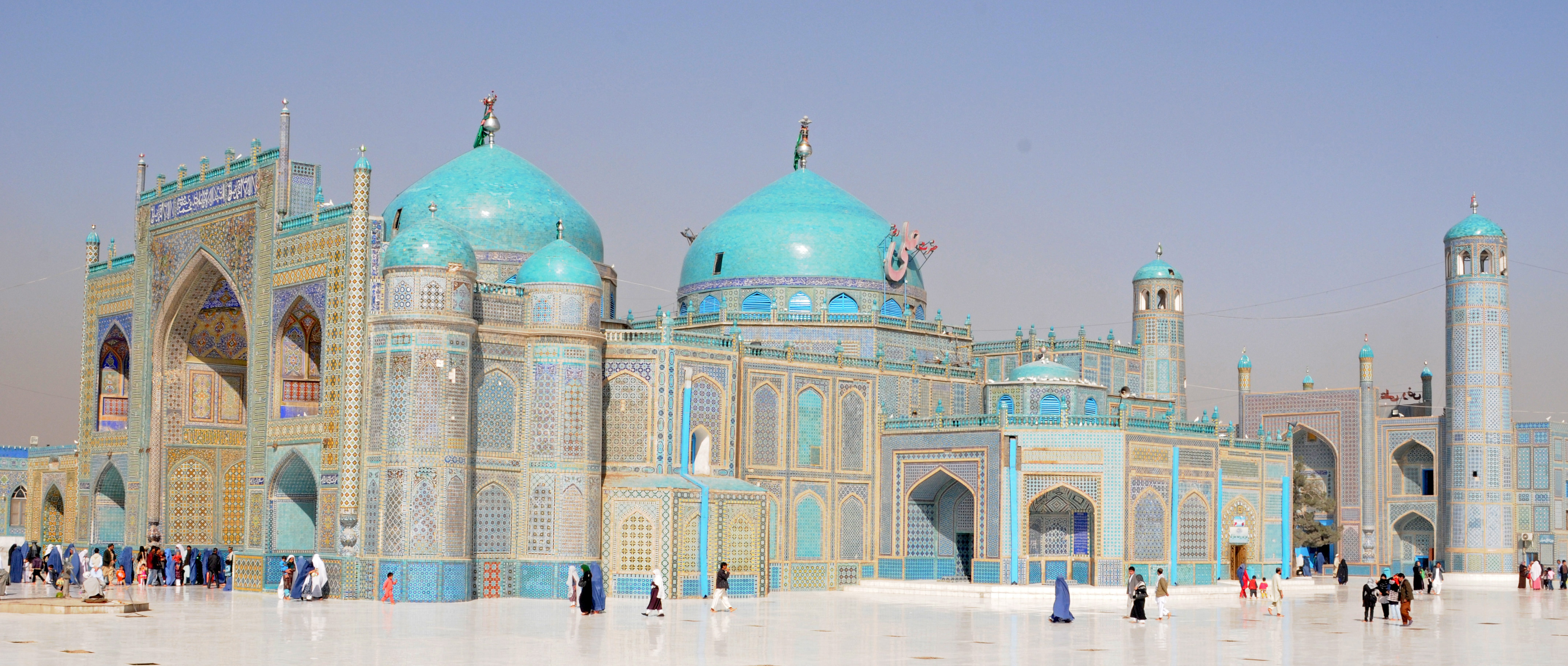
The Blue Mosque was closed during the lockdown in Mazar-i-Sharif.

The annual Nowruz festival in Mazar-i-Sharif and across the whole of Afghanistan was not held in 2020, in order to prevent the spread of the COVID-19 pandemic. The Nowruz celebrations in Balkh were canceled after the first case was reported on 14 March. People were also not allowed to enter the Blue Mosque in Mazar-i-Sharif.

Around 500 mosques were closed in Herat in late March 2020. On 5 April, the Ministry of Hajj and Religious Affairs and clerics announced a fatwa, including restrictions on Friday prayers and other prayers in mosques across Afghanistan. On 22 May, the Hajj Ministry told people that they should avoid gatherings on Eid-al-Fitr if they have COVID-19 symptoms.

=== Sports ===
The Afghanistan National Olympic Committee (ANOC) announced that all sport events were canceled after 14 March, including a Buzkashi league tournament that was being held in Kabul. Despite the lockdown, Fahim Anwari continued training for the 2020 Summer Olympics at Qargha Lake in Kabul.

=== Media ===
On 2 July 2020, it was announced that Moby Media Group and Bayat Group had reported cases of COVID-19 among its employees. In Baghlan Province, a radio station stopped broadcasting because their editors had tested positive. By 4 June, Reporters Without Borders (RSF) announced that 70 Afghan media employees had tested positive. Radio Nasim, a private FM radio station, struggled to air its programs. Many reporters lost their jobs during the pandemic. Ten media outlets, including TOLOnews and Ariana News, appealed to the Afghan government for help. Fewer ads resulted in falling revenues.

=== Economy ===
==== Loss of jobs and poverty ====
In Herat Province, more than 35,000 shops and factories were closed by 16 April 2020, leading to a loss of profits and unemployment. Economic difficulties has resulting in workers and shop owners being unable to pay rents. Construction also stopped in the province. On 17 April, shopkeepers and street vendors across Kabul announced that their incomes had been affected by the lockdown. Breadwinners of families and low-wage vendors have been badly affected in poor communities of Kabul. According to the government, a future program will provide aid. On 18 April, Balkh officials and volunteers announced that over 20,000 displaced people and returnees, as well as over 10,000 vulnerable families in the province, needed assistance due to the loss of jobs, low wages, and unemployment. Food supplies from Uzbekistan had not been distributed to the vulnerable families yet, despite arriving weeks earlier.

==== Local businesses ====
On 12 April 2020, the national power company, Da Afghanistan Breshna Sherkat (DABS), asked the government for a $50 million loan after announcing that they had lost 60% of their revenue due to the outbreak. If the imported electricity from Uzbekistan is not paid, Afghanistan could have power cuts.

On 21 April 2020, the Ministry of Interior Affairs started an investigation on an active restaurant (Seven Stars) in Taimani, during the lockdown in Kabul. The owner of the restaurant attacked a reporter for TOLOnews. On 22 April, the restaurant was closed and the owner was prosecuted. On 23 April, the investigation on Shakila Ibrahim, the owner of Seven Stars, was sent to the Attorney General's Office of Afghanistan. The Afghan Journalist Safety Committee advised the government to take the investigation seriously.

On 7 May 2020, Kam Air announced that during the lockdown it loses over £6 million a week as all 119 local and international flights were stopped. Aviation companies requested tax exemptions from the Ministry of Finance. Tourist companies were also affected.

==== Trading ====
On 16 April 2020, nearly 2000 containers set for Afghanistan were stuck at the Port of Karachi in Pakistan. On 3 June, the Afghanistan Chamber of Commerce and Investment (ACCI) announced that there was a decline in exports to other countries trade routes with neighboring countries had been closed. On 20 June, Pakistan's Ministry of Interior announced that the Torkham and Spin Boldak borders would open for six days a week under strict health measures. On 22 June, Pakistan opened its border crossings, allowing exports for the first time in three months. On 15 July, Pakistan allowed Afghan exports to India through the Wagah border, after taking COVID-19 measures. On 17 July, China applauded the resumption of trade relations between Afghanistan and Pakistan after five land crossings had opened. The five land crossings were Torkham, Chaman, Ghulam Khan, Angur Ada and Dand-e-Patan.

=== Education ===
It was announced on 14 March 2020, that all educational institutes in the country would not open until 21 April. However, from 11 April, it was announced that lessons would be taught online via television and radio. On 7 May, the Ministry of Education launched an online website for school students in Dari and Pashto. Acting Minister Mirwais Balkhi announced that all coursework at home would be graded if exams were not held. On 19 June, it was announced that all Afghan schools and universities will remain closed until September. On 22 August, all schools were reopened in Afghanistan.

=== Social ===
On 21 March 2020, wedding halls and hammams were closed and governmental departments with large numbers of employees stopped working. The five week lockdown in the capital, Kabul, affected small businesses, such as local shop owners.

==== Ghor Protest ====
On 9 May 2020, six protesters were killed in Chaghcharan, Ghor Province while protesting against the unfair food aid distribution that was given by Qatar during the pandemic. The protesters attacked security forces and government property. Three of the protesters were shot by police and tanks were later placed in the city. The Afghanistan Journalists' Centre announced that local volunteer radio presenter Ahmadkhan Nawid was killed. Two policemen were also killed. The Ministry of Interior Affairs announced that ten police officers and nine civilians were injured. Amnesty International launched an investigation on the use of police.

=== Immigration ===
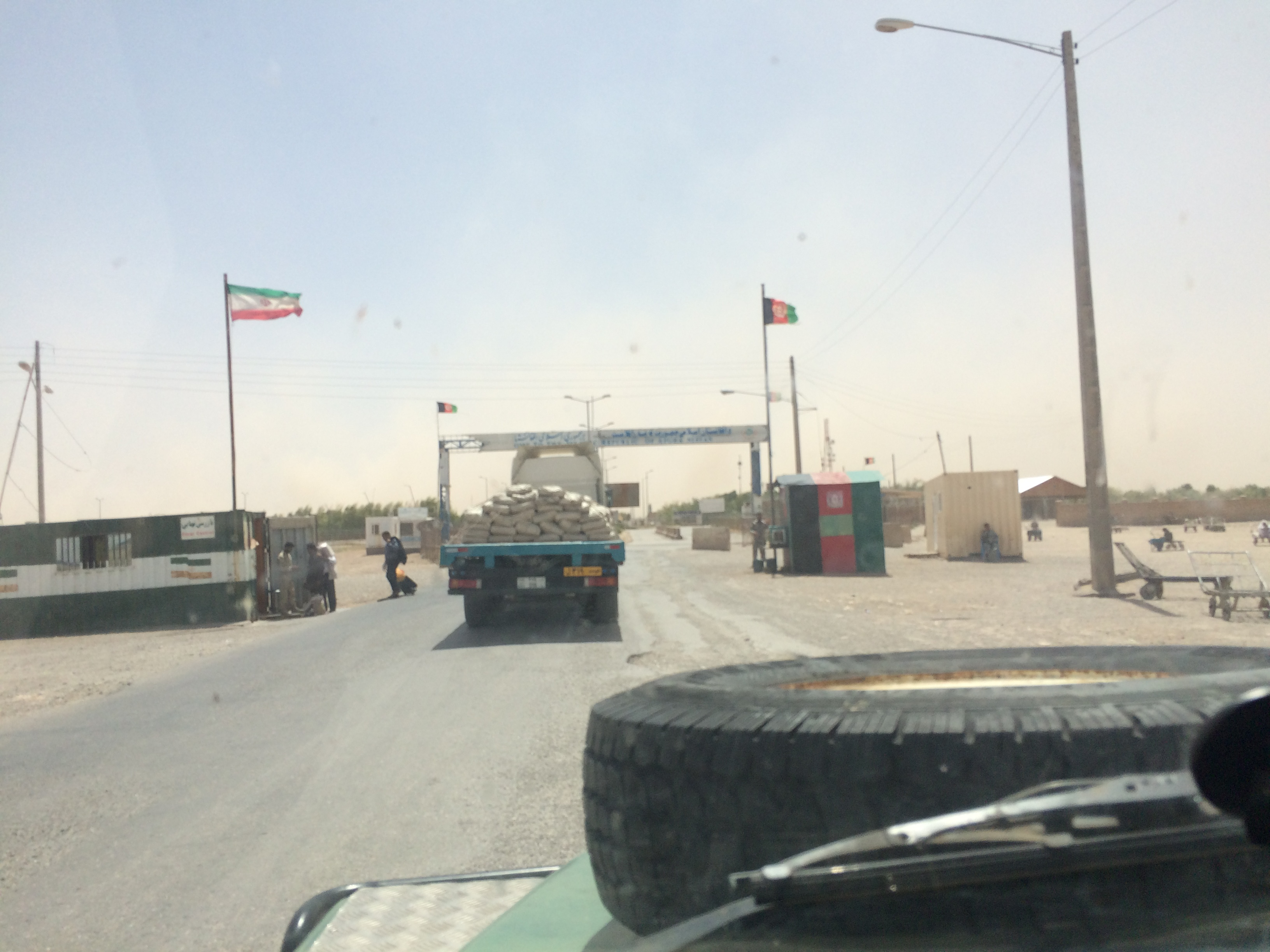
The Islam Qala border

During March 2020, over 30,000 Afghan immigrants were reported to have returned from Iran, via Islam Qala port, after the outbreak in the country. This marked the highest rate of returning immigrants from Iran in over a decade.

=== Effects on travel ===
==== Travel restrictions ====
After the three suspected cases in Herat, Afghanistan later temporarily closed its border with Iran on 23 February 2020. On 19 June, in order to rescue for Afghan citizens, the Government of Afghanistan re-opened its border with Iran, which had been closed briefly to all air and ground travel.

In March 2020, the Ministry of Transport and Civil Aviation restricted most international flights by Afghan airlines due to the global pandemic. Ariana Afghan Airlines and Kam Air suspended all flights, except from flights to Pakistan and Dubai. On 1 April, the Government of Afghanistan suspended flights between Kabul and Herat. On 19 June, aviation and ground transportation, travel and borders to other countries, would also remain closed until the decrease of COVID-19 cases. On 24 June, Afghanistan resumed international air travel.

On 21 October 2020, at least 12 people were killed during a rampage at the soccer stadium in eastern Afghanistan. Around 10,000 people were at the stadium waiting for token that could enable them to apply for the visa to Pakistan. Many of the applicants were seeking visa for medical care. The incident came after the Pakistani Consulate in Jalalabad resumed operations after being closed for 8 months due to COVID-19 travel restrictions.

==== Pakistan's response ====
In response to Afghanistan's and Iran's cases, Pakistan closed its border at Chaman with Afghanistan for at least three weeks, starting on 2 March 2020, as both countries confirmed rising number of cases over the weeks. On 13 March, all land borders with Pakistan were closed. It was also announced that Pakistan would completely seal its land border with Afghanistan from 16 March for at least two weeks. On 21 March, Pakistan reopened its border with Afghanistan.

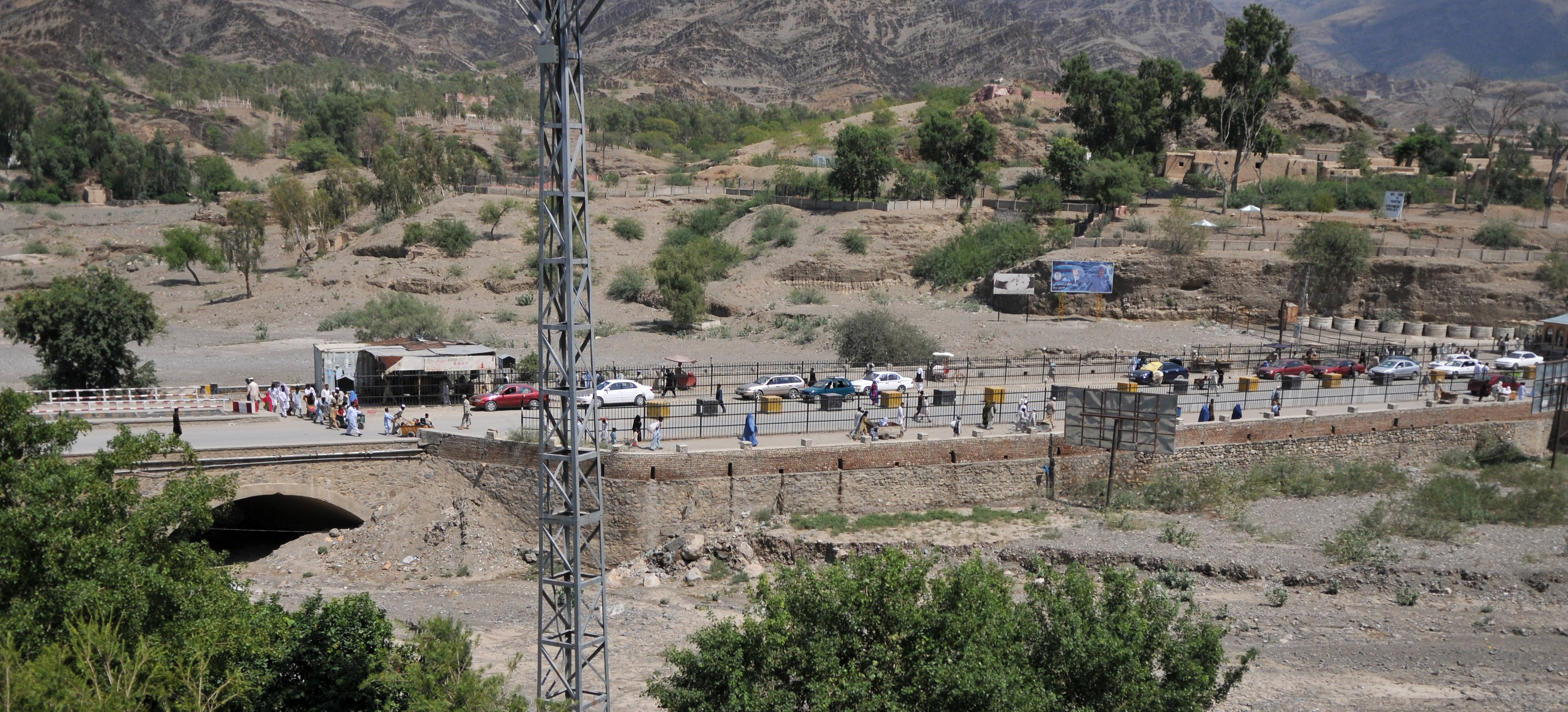
The Torkham border crossing

On 4 April, Pakistan announced that the Chaman and Torkham borders will open between 6 and 9 April for stranded Afghans to return to their country at the request of the Afghan government.

== Statistics ==
=== Overview ===
The table below shows the confirmed COVID-19 cases in each Province of Afghanistan. By 5 May 2020, all 34 provinces had at least one confirmed positive case of COVID-19.

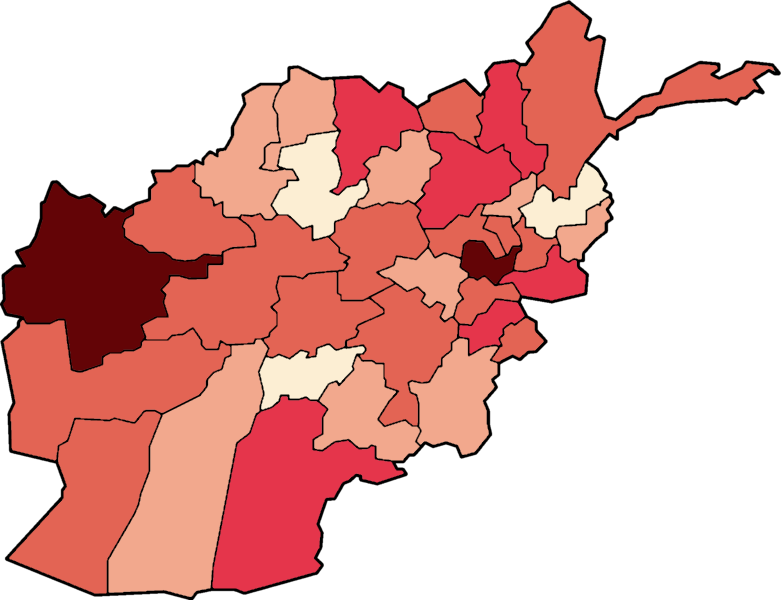
Map of the number of confirmed cases of COVID-19 in Afghanistan as of 17 January 2021. Confirmed cases 1–199 Confirmed cases 200–499 Confirmed cases 500–999 Confirmed cases 1000–4999 Confirmed cases ≥5000

COVID-19 in Afghanistan by Province as of 20 April 2021
Province	Cases	Deaths	Recoveries	Tests
Badakhshan Province	648	24	565	3,451
Badghis Province	843	16	810	2,933
Baghlan Province	1,110	37	1,008	6,217
Balkh Province	3,431	180	3,058	18,872
Bamyan Province	990	18	907	3,809
Daykundi Province	938	20	917	3,217
Farah Province	613	45	545	1,408
Faryab Province	463	30	374	4,602
Ghazni Province	907	76	782	3,024
Ghor Province	669	17	571	1,824
Helmand Province	472	37	358	4,468
Herat Province	9,343	439	8,840	28,350
Jowzjan Province	248	12	210	837
Kabul Province	18,896 (Note: Including 4 foreign troops and 2 foreign diplomats.)	816	16,967	208,634
Kandahar Province	2,872	64	2,565	23,837
Kapisa Province	619	24	583	3,362
Khost Province	672	77	589	1,441
Kunar Province	755	46	669	2,971
Kunduz Province	1,008	55	870	5,336
Laghman Province	865	16	772	3,229
Logar Province	731	34	663	3,134
Nangarhar Province	3,325	179	2,581	13,680
Nimruz Province	711	26	645	5,162
Nuristan Province	168	2	133	985
Paktia Province	1,511	50	1,415	5,054
Paktika Province	322	15	294	1,183
Panjshir Province	411	19	325	2,205
Parwan Province	868	31	772	4,565
Samangan Province	351	18	314	752
Sar-e Pol Province	235	6	228	1,244
Takhar Province	2,108	72	1,992	7,450
Urozgan Province	182	6	142	1,899
Wardak Province	563	29	500	3,719
Zabul Province	367	21	308	2,068
Total (34 Provinces)	58,212	2,557	52,272	384,922

=== Graphs ===
==== Cumulative number of cases, recoveries and deaths ====
View source data.

==== Number of total positive cases ====
View source data.

==== New cases per day ====
View source data.

==== Deaths per day ====
View source data.

== See also ==
- Timeline of the COVID-19 pandemic in Afghanistan
- COVID-19 pandemic in Asia
  - COVID-19 pandemic in South Asia
