= Afghanistan–Iran border =

International border

The Afghanistan–Iran border is 921 km (572 mi) in length and runs from the tripoint with Turkmenistan in the north to the tripoint with Pakistan in the south.

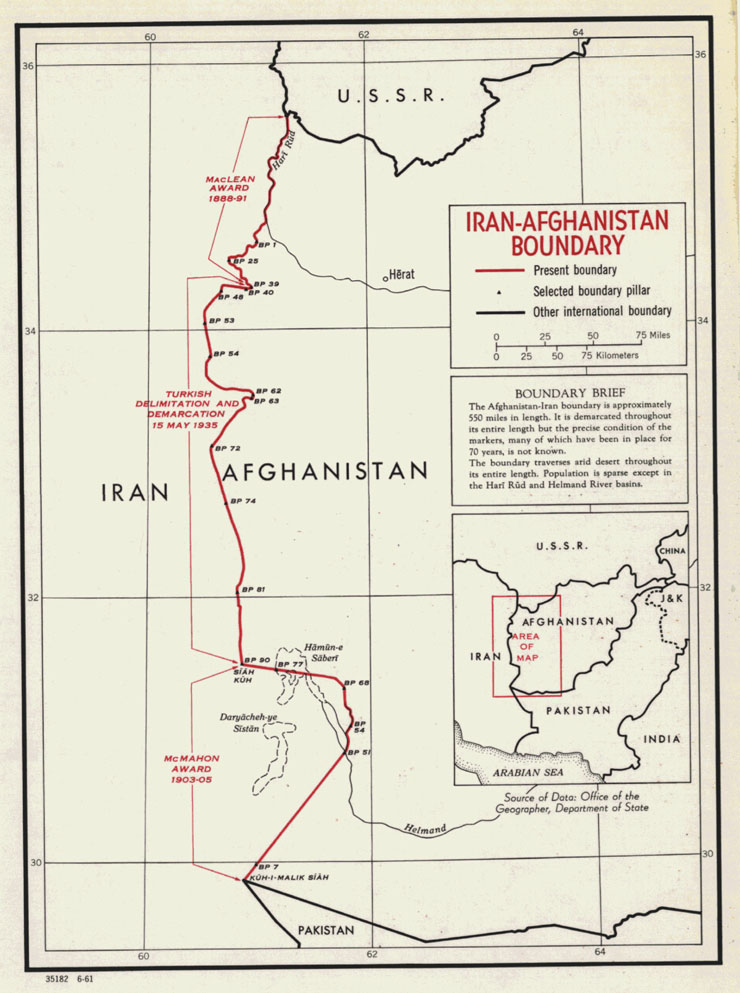
Map of the boundary between Afghanistan and Iran

== Description ==
The border begins at the tripoint with Turkmenistan in the Harirud river before proceeding overland just to the east of the Iranian town of Taybad. The border then follows a series of short straight lines, passing through the Daryache-ye Namakzar and the Daqq-e Patergan salt lakes; two 'beaks' of Iranian territory protrude into Afghanistan along this section. The middle 'Turkish section' (see below) consists of a series of straight lines through a plain, with some mountains to the south, ending at Kuh Siah mountain, where the border veers sharply to the east. It cuts through Hamun Lake before turning south, where it follows the Juy-e Siksar River down to the confluence with the Helmand River. The border is then formed of a long straight line segment going southwest to the tripoint with Pakistan at the Kuh-i-Malik Salih mountain.

The border traverses a generally arid, inhospitable region with few inhabitants, except in the Zabol-Zaranj area where the main border crossing is located.

== History ==
The border between Qajar Iran and Afghanistan was formalised in the period 1872–1935 by a series of third-party arbitrations, stemming from the Treaty of Paris (1857) in which Iran and Afghanistan agreed to refer any dispute between them to Britain for arbitration. (At the time, Britain controlled large parts of India, including what is now Pakistan.) A series of skirmishes between Afghanistan and Iran in the 1860s prompted the shah of Iran, Naser al-Din Shah Qajar, to request that the British formalise the Afghan-Iran boundary. A rough delimitation was proposed in 1872 by a committee headed by Sir Frederic John Goldsmid following a line from Banda to Kuh-i-Malik Siah (a hill at the modern Afghanistan-Iran-Pakistan tripoint) via the Helmand River. Both parties eventually accepted this proposal however it was not implemented further at that time.

The Goldsmid boundary proved to be inadequate, especially given the shifting of the course of the Helmand, and thus a more precise boundary was drawn up in three sections over the following decades: the northern section by General C.S. MacLean, British consul general for Khorasan and Sīstān, in 1888–91, the southern section by Colonel Sir Henry McMahon in 1903–05 and finally the middle section by Turkey's General Fahrettin Altay in 1934–35. After each demarcation boundary pillars were erected, leading to a total of 172 pillars being erected in the non-riverine sections of the border.

The boundary itself was not disputed after 1935, however disputes over the allocation of water resources in the region rumbled on for many years and were not finally resolved until 1973.

== Border crossings ==
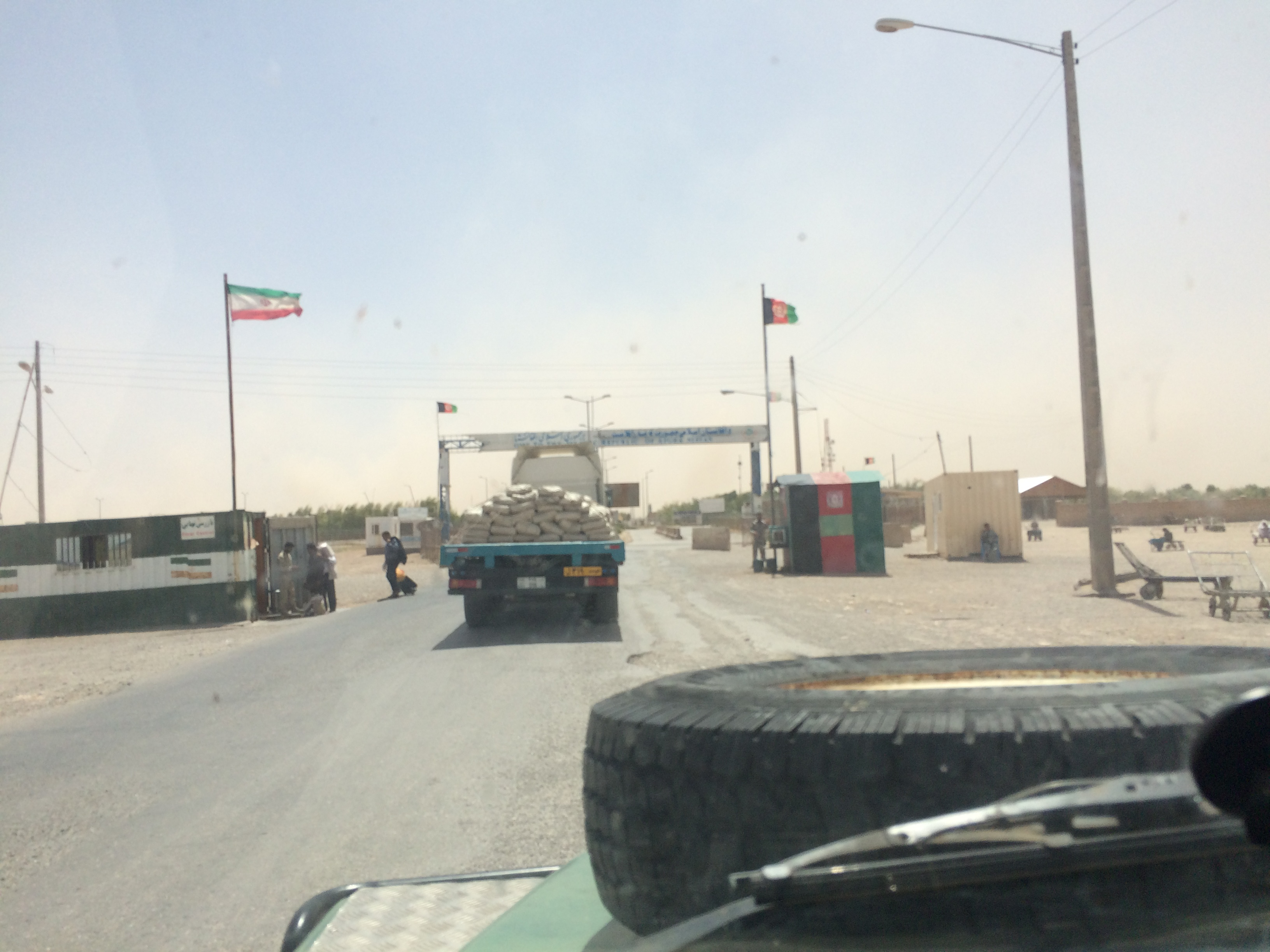
Entering Islam Qala in Afghanistan from Taybad in Iran

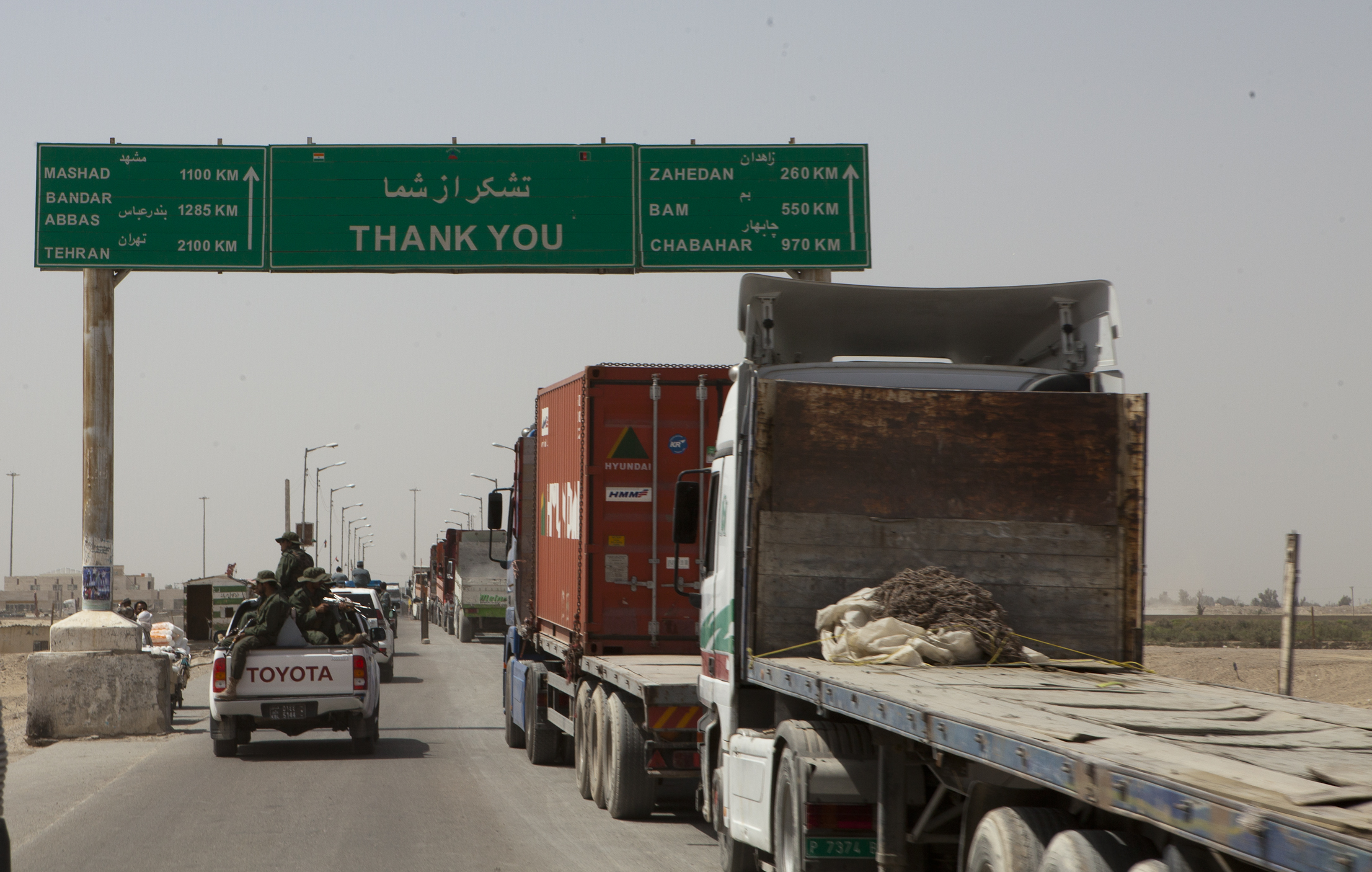
The Abresham (Silk Bridge) border crossing west of Zaranj in Nimruz Province of Afghanistan

Afghanistan–Iran border crossings:
(Afghanistan) Afghan checkpoint	(Iran) Iranian checkpoint
Islam Qala (Herat Province)	Dogharoun, Taybad (Razavi Khorasan province)
Kalata-I-Nazar Khan	Yazdan (South Khorasan province)
Abu Nasr Farahi (Farah Province)	Mahirud (South Khorasan province)
Zaranj (Nimruz Province)	Milak (Sistan and Baluchestan province)

== Settlements near the border ==
=== Afghanistan ===
- Chah Sagak
- Islam Qala
- Kalate-ye Nazar Khan
- Kareyz-e Elyas
- Komisari
- Mirza Abu Bakr
- Pish Robat
- Tahana-e Chah-e Sangar
- Zaranj

=== Iran ===
- Jannatabad, Torbat-e Jam
- Kalate-ye Kabud
- Kamane-ye Mohammad Khan
- Kamareh Yusef
- Katamak, Hirmand
- Malu Pa’in
- Masumabad, Zirkuh
- Musaabad
- Pasgah-e Kurigan
- Qaleh Borj
- Taybad
- Zabol

== See also ==
- Afghanistan–Iran relations
- Afghans in Iran
- 2025 Afghan deportation from Iran
