= ANSF =

ANSF may refer to:

- Agenzia Nazionale per la Sicurezza delle Ferrovie, an Italian government agency overseeing the safety of the country's rail system
- Afghan National Security Forces, the uniformed military and security forces of Afghanistan
- Afghanistan National Swimming Federation, sport organization based in Afghanistan
