= List of Afghan records in swimming =

The Afghan records in swimming are the fastest ever performances of swimmers from Afghanistan, which are recognised and ratified by the Afghanistan National Swimming Federation.

All records were set in finals unless noted otherwise.

== Long Course (50 m) ==
=== Men ===
Event	Time		Name	Club	Date	Meet	Location	Ref
50 m freestyle	26.78	h	Mohammad Ibrahim Rajabi	Afghanistan	15 May 2017	Islamic Solidarity Games	Baku, Azerbaijan	
100 m freestyle	1:05.99	h	Ali Nazari	Afghanistan	23 August 2017	Universiade	Taipei, Taiwan	
200 m freestyle								
400 m freestyle								
800 m freestyle	12:19.12	†	Ali Reza Naseeri	Afghanistan	7 February 2016	South Asian Games	Guwahati, India	
1500 m freestyle	23:51.66		Ali Reza Naseeri	Afghanistan	7 February 2016	South Asian Games	Guwahati, India	
50 m backstroke	39.03	h	Hedayatullah Noorzad	Afghanistan	27 July 2019	World Championships	Gwangju, South Korea	
100 m backstroke	1:19.90	r	Ali Reza Naseeri	Afghanistan	10 February 2016	South Asian Games	Guwahati, India	
200 m backstroke								
50 m breaststroke	31.89	h	Fahim Anwari	Afghanistan	5 April 2021	Russian Championships	Kazan, Russia	
100 m breaststroke								
200 m breaststroke								
50 m butterfly	28.79	h	Fahim Anwari	Afghanistan	4 April 2021	Russian Championships	Kazan, Russia	
100 m butterfly	1:31.03		Naseer Hussaini	Afghanistan	6 February 2016	South Asian Games	Guwahati, India	
200 m butterfly								
200 m individual medley								
400 m individual medley								
4×100 m freestyle relay	4:42.51		Mohammad Ibrahim Rajabi (1:07.62); Ali Reza Naseeri (1:08.94); Hamid Rahimi (1:18.07); Mohammad Jawad (1:07.88)	Afghanistan	6 February 2016	South Asian Games	Guwahati, India	
4×200 m freestyle relay								
4×100 m medley relay	5:09.03		Ali Reza Naseeri (1:19.90); Hamid Rahimi (1:28.72); Mohammad Ibrahim Rajabi (1:10.99); Mohammad Jawad (1:09.42)	Afghanistan	10 February 2016	South Asian Games	Guwahati, India	

Legend: # – Record awaiting ratification by Afghanistan National Swimming Federation; WR – World record; AS – Asian record;
Records not set in finals: h – heat; sf – semifinal; r – relay 1st leg; rh – relay heat 1st leg; b – B final; † – en route to final mark; tt – time trial

== Short Course (25 m) ==
=== Men ===
Event	Time		Name	Club	Date	Meet	Location	Ref
50 m freestyle	29.76	h	Hamid Rahimi	Afghanistan	22 September 2017	Asian Indoor and Martial Arts Games	Ashgabat, Turkmenistan	
100 m freestyle	1:04.45	h	Ali Nasiri	Afghanistan	25 September 2017	Asian Indoor and Martial Arts Games	Ashgabat, Turkmenistan	
200 m freestyle								
400 m freestyle								
800 m freestyle								
1500 m freestyle								
50 m backstroke								
100 m backstroke								
200 m backstroke								
50m breaststroke	31.46	h	Fahim Anwari	Afghanistan	29 October 2021	World Cup	Kazan, Russia	
100 m breaststroke								
200 m breaststroke								
50m butterfly	28.52	h	Fahim Anwari	Afghanistan	30 October 2021	World Cup	Kazan, Russia	
100m butterfly	1:05.15	h	Fahim Anwari	Afghanistan	28 October 2021	World Cup	Kazan, Russia	
200 m butterfly								
100 m individual medley								
200 m individual medley								
400 m individual medley								
4×50 m freestyle relay								
4×100 m freestyle relay								
4×200 m freestyle relay								
4×50 m medley relay								
4×100 m medley relay								

Legend: # – Record awaiting ratification by Afghanistan National Swimming Federation; WR – World record; AS – Asian record;
Records not set in finals: h – heat; sf – semifinal; r – relay 1st leg; rh – relay heat 1st leg; b – B final; † – en route to final mark; tt – time trial
