= Islam Qala =

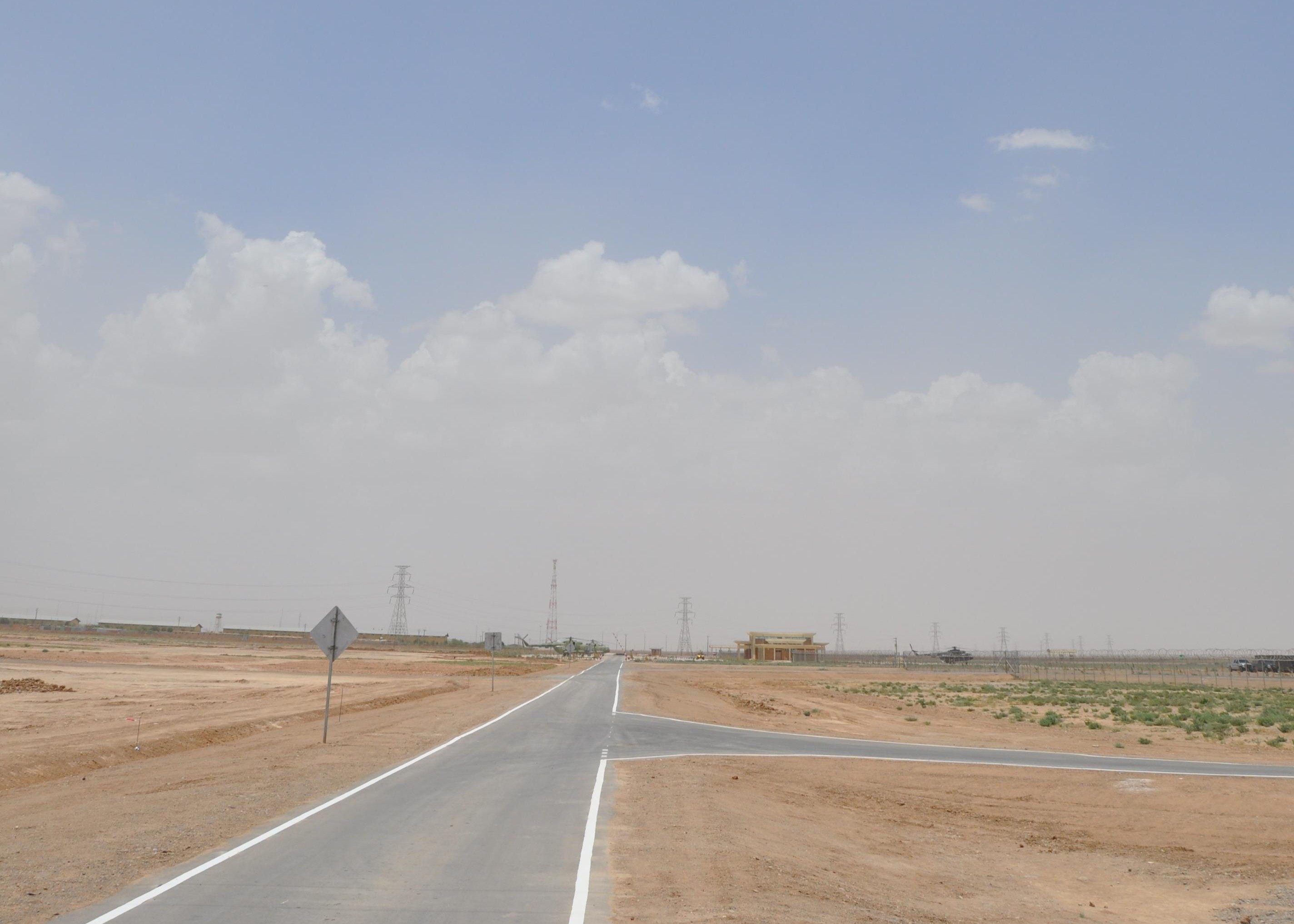
- A road in Islam Qala, Afghanistan

- Location in Afghanistan
- Coordinates: 34°39′36″N 61°06′27″E
- Country: Afghanistan
- Province: Herat Province
- District: Islam Qala District
- Elevation: 731 m (2,398 ft)

Population
  - Total: 16,408
- Time zone: UTC+04:30 (Afghanistan Time)

Islām Qala (Pashto: اسلام کلا, Dari: اسلام قلعه) is a border town in the western Herat province of Afghanistan, near the Afghanistan–Iran border. It is the official port of entry by land from neighboring Taybad in Iran. The Dowqarun-Islam Qala border crossing is located about 10 km (6.2 mi) northwest of the town.

Islam Qala is administered as part of Islam Qala District of Herat Province and is linked to the city of Herat via the Islam Qala-Herat Highway. The town plays an important role in the economy of Afghanistan because a substantial volume of national trade passes through it.

Islam Qala is believed to have a population of about 16,408 residents. It has gradually expanded in the last two decades due to the establishment of various facilities. Among them is a refugees repatriation center in which large number of returnees are processed everyday by the Ministry of Refugees and the International Organization for Migration (IOM). The town had a strong presence of Afghan Border Police and other national security forces until the takeover of the Herat province during the 2021 Taliban offensive.

== History ==
Islam Qala became a border town during the Durrani Empire in the 19th century, after Afghanistan became a sovereign state. Many armies, traders and travelers have passed through the town throughout history. The Asian Highway 1 (AH1), which is part of the Asian Highway Network from Tokyo in Japan to west of Istanbul in Turkey, where it connects to the European route E80 (E80) that continues to Lisbon, passes thru Islam Qala.

On February 13, 2021, due to corruption and negligence, a large number of trucks were burnt by a fire incident at a parking area in Islam Qala. On July 9, 2021, the entire town fell to the Taliban forces without incident. Since then, it has been claimed that the corruption in the town has been eliminated and government revenue increased to over 8 billion afghanis in less than a year.

== Climate ==
Influenced by the local steppe climate, Islam Qala experiences a cold semi-arid climate (BSk) under the Köppen climate classification. The average temperature in Islam Qala is 17.3 °C, while the annual precipitation averages 225 mm.

July is the hottest month of the year with an average temperature of 29.5 °C. The coldest month January has an average temperature of 5.5 °C.

Climate data for Islam Qala
| Month | Jan | Feb | Mar | Apr | May | Jun | Jul | Aug | Sep | Oct | Nov | Dec | Year |
|---|---|---|---|---|---|---|---|---|---|---|---|---|---|
| Mean daily maximum °C (°F) | 11.9 (53.4) | 14.4 (57.9) | 19.0 (66.2) | 23.9 (75.0) | 30.5 (86.9) | 35.9 (96.6) | 37.3 (99.1) | 36.4 (97.5) | 32.2 (90.0) | 26.6 (79.9) | 18.8 (65.8) | 13.5 (56.3) | 25.0 (77.1) |
| Daily mean °C (°F) | 5.5 (41.9) | 7.6 (45.7) | 12.1 (53.8) | 16.5 (61.7) | 22.2 (72.0) | 27.4 (81.3) | 29.5 (85.1) | 28.2 (82.8) | 23.5 (74.3) | 17.6 (63.7) | 10.7 (51.3) | 6.6 (43.9) | 17.3 (63.1) |
| Mean daily minimum °C (°F) | −0.9 (30.4) | 1.2 (34.2) | 5.2 (41.4) | 9.2 (48.6) | 14.0 (57.2) | 19.0 (66.2) | 21.8 (71.2) | 20.1 (68.2) | 14.6 (58.3) | 8.6 (47.5) | 2.7 (36.9) | −0.3 (31.5) | 9.6 (49.3) |
Source: Climate-Data.org

== Gallery ==
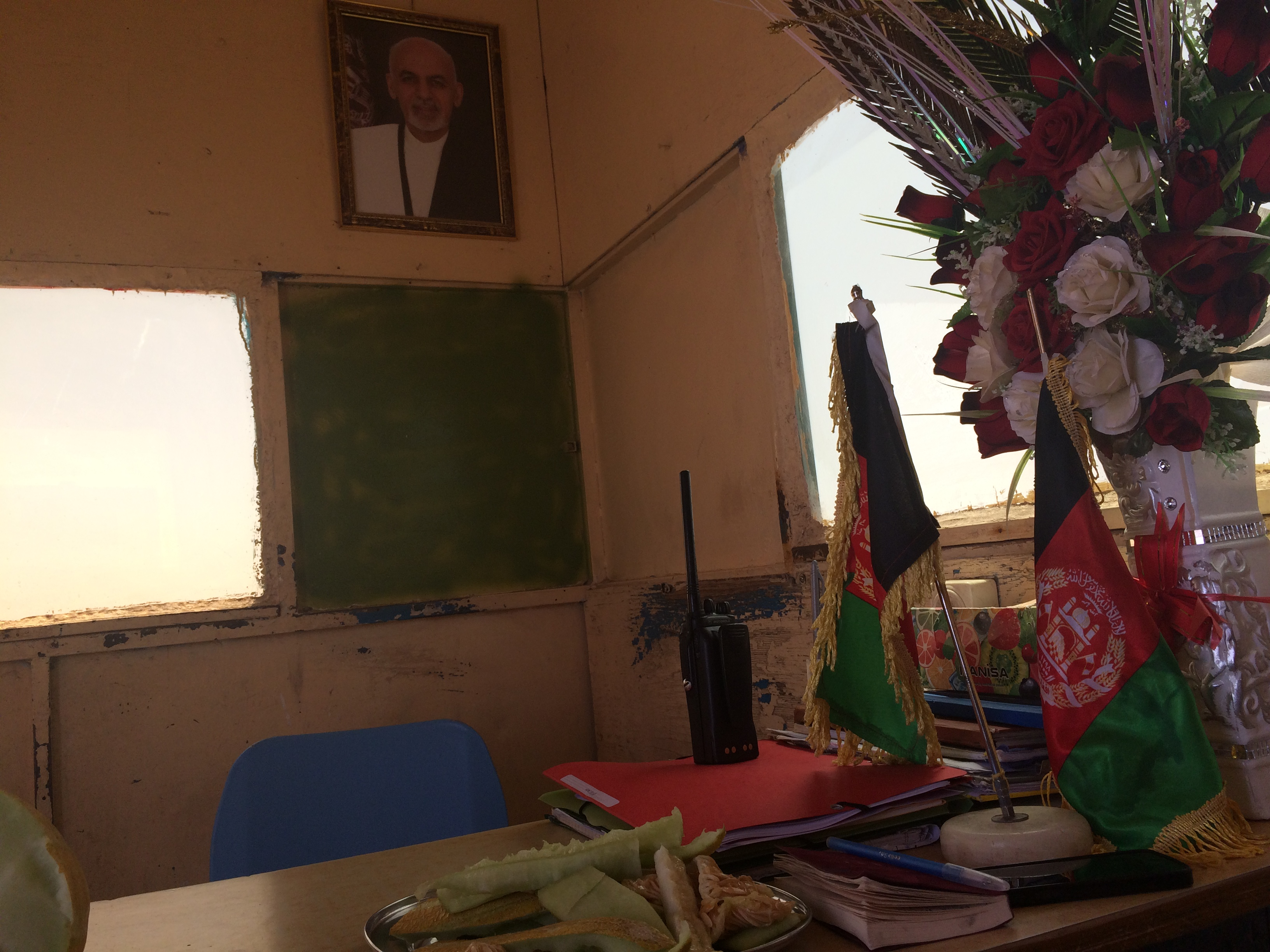
Afghanistan's passport checkpoint at Islam Qala in 2015

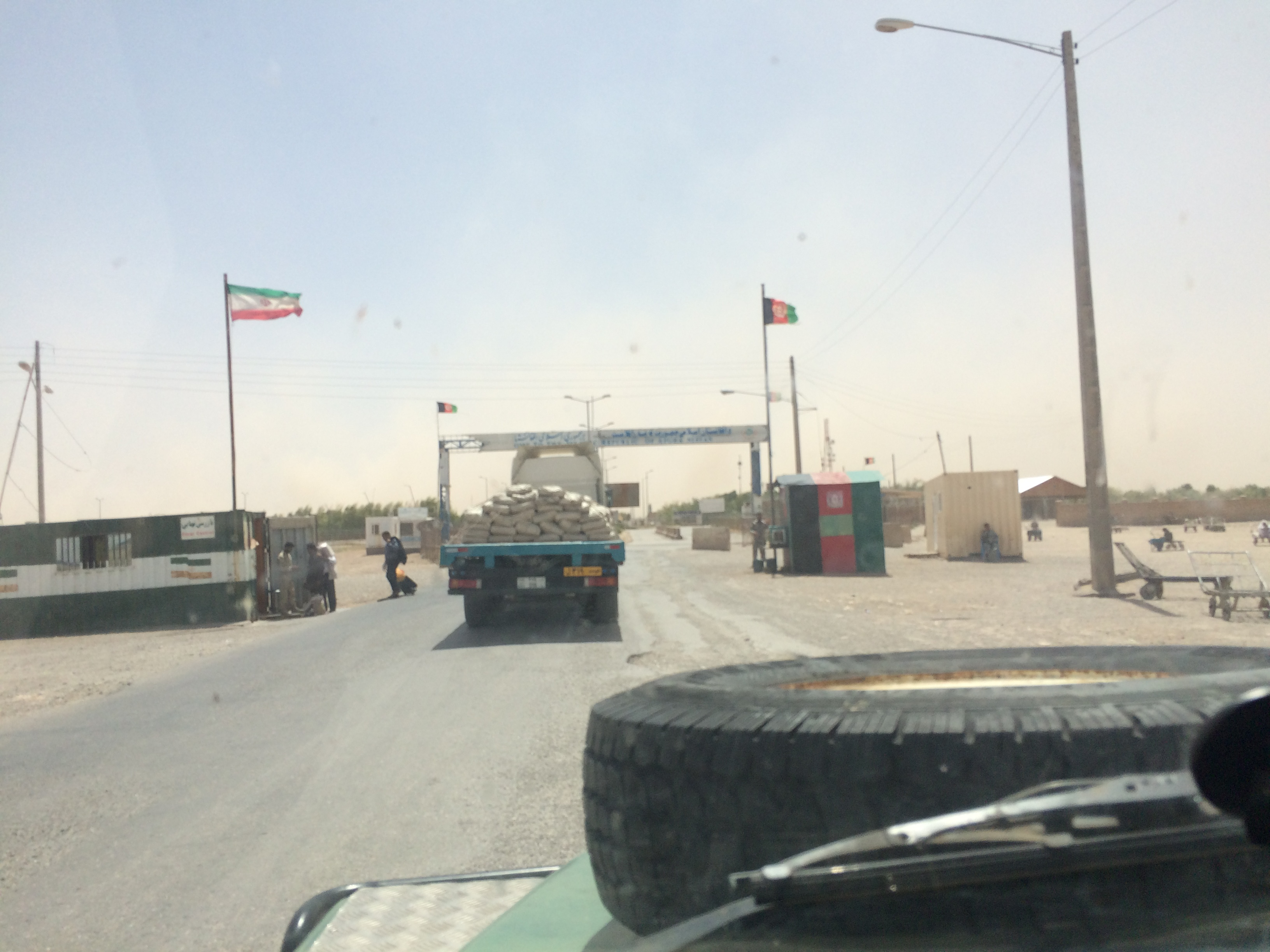
Entering Islam Qala from Taybad in Iran

== See also ==
- Demogan
- Ghulam Khan
- Hairatan
- Sher Khan Bandar
- Spin Boldak
- Torghundi
- Torkham
- Zaranj
