= Khyber Border Coordination Center =

- Active: March 29, 2008
- Disbanded: 2014
- Country: Afghanistan; Pakistan; ISAF
- Role: Joint warfare
- Garrison/HQ: Torkham, Pakistan
- Engagements: War in Afghanistan; War in North-West Pakistan

The Khyber Border Coordination Center was a joint intelligence center located near Torkham, Pakistan. The facility facilitated the sharing of information between Afghanistan, Pakistan, the International Security Assistance Force and NATO governments and military personnel in their efforts against Taliban forces in the Khyber Pass area.

Primarily managed by the United States, the center officially opened on March 29, 2008, and became operational in July 2008. It has since been closed.
