= Abdul Bari Omar =

Afghan acting Deputy Minister of Public Health

Abdul Bari Omar عبدالباری عمر

Deputy Minister of Public Health
- In office 21 September 2021 – 2022 Serving with Mohammad Hassan Ghiasi
- Prime Minister: Mohammad Hassan Akhund (acting)
- Minister: Qalandar Ibad
- Supreme Leader: Hibatullah Akhundzada

Personal details
- Born: 1987 (age 38–39) Daudkhil Village of Pol-e Alam, Logar Province, Afghanistan
- Education: Pajhwok University
- Occupation: Physician, politician, Taliban member

Abdul Bari Omar (Pashto: عبدالباري عمر) is an Afghan physician who is serving as Acting Director, Food and Drug Administration. Omar has also served the acting Deputy Minister of Public Health of Afghanistan from 21 September 2021 to early 2022, alongside Mohammad Hassan Ghiasi.

== Early life ==
Abdul Bari Omar was born in 1987 in Daudkhil Village of Pol-e Alam, Logar Province, Afghanistan. He completed his primary and secondary education in his hometown before traveling abroad for medical education. He graduated from the Faculty of Therapeutics of Pajhwok University. He also received a postgraduate diploma in imaging and ultrasonography.

== Performances in the Netherlands and Germany 2023 ==
In November 2023, he took part in World Health Organization (WHO) conference in The Hague and later gave a lecture at the DITIB-Zentralmoschee Köln-Chorweiler in Cologne. At the WHO-conference sent a photo with Minister of Health, Welfare and Sport Ernst Kuipers. After the performance in Cologne, there were critical comments in the Netherlands and in Germany.
