= Yazdani =

Yazdani or Yezdani may refer to:

- Yazdani (surname)
- Demonym of people from Yazd or Yazdan
- Follower of the assumed pre-Islamic Kurdish religion Yazdânism
- Yazdani Bakery, Irani cafe or Persian style bakery in Mumbai, India

== See also ==
- Yazdan (disambiguation)
- Abbas Yazdani, village in Iran
- Chah-e Mohammadabad Yazdani, village in Iran
- Mazraeh-ye Yazdani, Golestan, village in Iran
