= Afghanistan at the 2023 World Aquatics Championships =

- Flag of Afghanistan
- FINA code: AFG
- National federation: Afghanistan National Swimming Federation

in Fukuoka, Japan
- Competitors: 1 in 1 sport

World Aquatics Championships appearances
- 1973; 1975; 1978; 1982; 1986; 1991; 1994; 1998; 2001; 2003; 2005; 2007; 2009; 2011; 2013; 2015; 2017; 2019; 2022; 2023; 2024

Afghanistan is set to compete at the 2023 World Aquatics Championships in Fukuoka, Japan from 14 to 30 July.

== Swimming ==
Afghanistan entered 1 swimmer.

Men

Athlete	Event	Heat		Semifinal		Final	
Athlete	Event	Time	Rank	Time	Rank	Time	Rank
Fahim Anwari	50 metre freestyle						
Fahim Anwari	50 metre breaststroke						
