= Qalandar Ibad =

Acting minister of public health in Afghanistan

Qalandar Ibad قلندر عباد

Minister of Public Health
- Acting; 21 September 2021 – 28 May 2024
- Prime Minister: Hasan Akhund (acting)
- Deputy: Abdul Bari Omar; Mohammad Hassan Ghiasi
- Preceded by: Wahid Majrooh (acting)
- Succeeded by: Maulawi Noor Jalal (acting)

Personal details
- Born: 1980 (age 45–46) Marzak, Sar Hawza District, Paktika Province, Democratic Republic of Afghanistan
- Education: Nangarhar University (MD); Pakistan Institute of Medical Sciences (MS)
- Occupation: Physician; politician
- Political affiliation: Taliban

Qalandar Ibad (Persian: ډاکټر قلندر عباد) (born; 1980) is an Afghan physician who served as the acting Minister of Public Health of Afghanistan from 21 September 2021 to 28 May 2024.

Ibad was born in 1980 in Marzak village, Sar Hawza District of Paktika province. He received his primary education in Peshawar, Pakistan. He received his medical degree (MD) from the Faculty of Medicine of Nangarhar University, and master’s in Urology from Pakistan Institute of Medical Sciences, Islamabad.
