= Sayed Ihsanuddin Taheri =

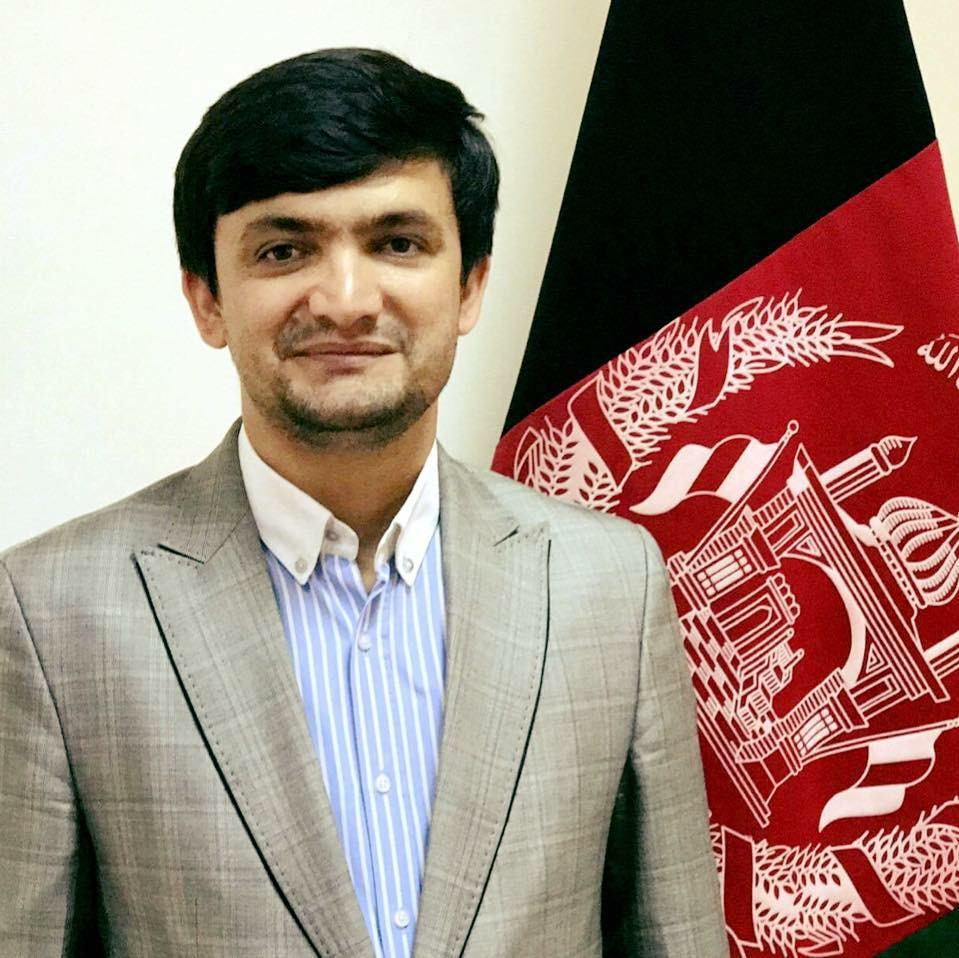
- Taheri in 2017
- Born: December 1984 (age 41)
- Occupations: Civil activist, politician, author, and blogger

Sayed Ihsanuddin Taheri, or Sayed Ihsan Taheri (Persian: سید احسان / Pashto: سید احسان الدین طاهری طاهری) (born in December 1984), is an Afghan civil activist, politician independent author, and blogger who was a 2012 World Vision International Peace Maker Prize nominee. He was an official of the government of the Islamic Republic of Afghanistan, who has held various positions since 2002. He is the elected member of FINA Media Committee.

== Career ==
=== Ministry of Finance ===
Taheri was working as Acting Deputy Minister for Administration and Director General Finance and Administration of the Ministry of Finance of Afghanistan until the collapse of the Republic in August 2021. He previously worked as Communications Director to the Afghan President at the Office of Public and Strategic Affairs of the Government of Afghanistan.

=== Charitable and commercial interests ===
Taheri was member of the Leadership Committee of Afghan Red Crescent Society. He was also the chairman to the Board of Directors of Afghanistan State-owned corporations such as: 1) Ariana Afghan Airlines, 2) Bakhtar Afghan Airlines, 3) Afghan Telecom - Afghanistan Telecommunications Company, and 4) Afghanistan High Security Printing Press.

Taheri was Spokesperson to the Afghanistan High Peace Council (Afghan Peace Process) and Director of Media and Strategic Communications in the Government Secretariat for Peace Process. He is the founding member of Afghanistan 3rd Trend (روند ٣ افغانستان) Afghanistan's Youth Socio-Political Trend. He is elected member of the FINA - International Swimming Federation-'s Media Committee representing Asia.

=== Previous governmental posts ===
Previously, he headed the Afghan Government Monitoring and Evaluation Authority at the Administrative Office of the President - AOP- of the Islamic Republic of Afghanistan. He served in the Presidential Office of Administrative Affairs and Council of Ministers Secretariat as Director of Information and Public Relations and Afghan Government Spokesperson.

Before that, he served at the Ministry of Education as Advisor to the Minister in Mass Communications and TV development where he developed the Educational Radio and Television of Afghanistan "MARIF rtv" to a better quality picture to gain more and further viewers. He was awarded as Universal Peace Federation – Netherlands Ambassador for Peace to Afghanistan.

=== Swimming ===
Taheri worked with Afghanistan National Swimming Federation (ANSF) as Elected President for three years - 2016-2019. During his Presidency in the Afghanistan National Swimming Federation, he managed to tackle challenges in establishing the first-ever Afghan Women Swimming Team and a committee for Women Swimming in the ANSF. He also managed to get two spots in the Budapest, Hungary 2017 50m World Swimming Championship for Afghanistan. Two Afghan swimmers Hamid Rahimi and Ebrahim Rajabi attended this prestigious and world stage championship for this first time in the history of this sport in Afghanistan.

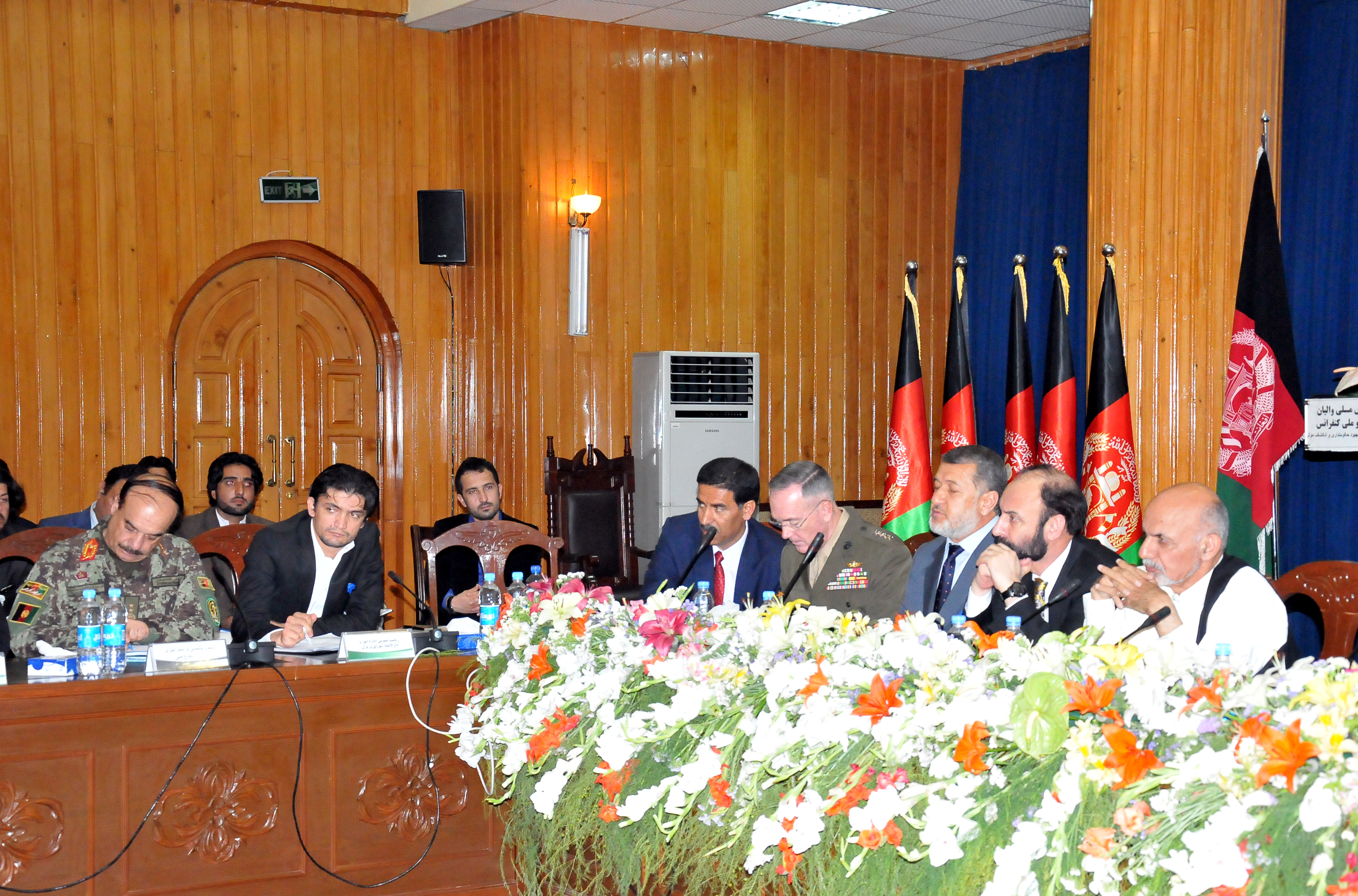
Governors National Conference was held in 2013 in Kabul where all the governors of Afghanistan 34 provinces got together and discussed their concerns with the leadership of the government.

=== Electoral committee ===
Taheri worked for the JEMB (Joint Electoral Management Body) and the AIEC (Interim Afghan Election Commission) that was established to run the first Presidential and Parliamentary Elections after 2001 where he and his colleagues managed to register 11.5 million Afghan voters and in the Constitution-forming process in several senior positions. These projects were jointly lead and managed by the Government of Afghanistan and United Nations office in Afghanistan, UNAMA.

=== Other interests ===
Taheri has attended many conferences nationally and internationally on the issues relevant to young generation of Afghanistan, political and election affairs, contributing with analyzing the current situation and making recommendations. As a young Afghan he took part in Afghanistan's post 2001 historical processes including the making of the Constitution, the first-ever presidential elections, the Afghanistan-Pakistan Joint Peace Jirga, and Consultative Loya jirga for talks on Afghan – American Strategic Partnership.

He was leading the Protocol and Formalities Committee of the 2013 Afghanistan Consultative Loya Jirga on Bilateral Security Agreement with the United States, the BSA. He also lead the Press and Media Committee of the Afghanistan Peace Consultative Jirga which took place in 2019 requested by the state to develop a roadmap for the government to kick off peace talks with the Taliban.
