= Afghanistan at the 2017 World Aquatics Championships =

- Flag of Afghanistan
- FINA code: AFG
- National federation: Afghanistan National Swimming Federation

in Budapest, Hungary
- Competitors: 2 in 1 sport
- Medals: Gold 0 Silver 0 Bronze 0 Total 0

World Aquatics Championships appearances
- 1973; 1975; 1978; 1982; 1986; 1991; 1994; 1998; 2001; 2003; 2005; 2007; 2009; 2011; 2013; 2015; 2017; 2019; 2022; 2023; 2024

Afghanistan competed at the 2017 World Aquatics Championships in Budapest, Hungary from 14 July to 30 July. This marked the first appearance for the nation at the World Aquatics Championships.

== Swimming ==
Afghanistan has received a Universality invitation from FINA to send two male swimmers to the World Championships.

Athlete	Event	Heat		Semifinal		Final	
Athlete	Event	Time	Rank	Time	Rank	Time	Rank
Hamid Rahimi	Men's 100 m freestyle	1:16.81	113	did not advance			
Hamid Rahimi	Men's 50 m breaststroke	37.95	79	did not advance			
Mohammad Rajabi	Men's 50 m freestyle	DNS		did not advance			
Mohammad Rajabi	Men's 50 m butterfly	DNS		did not advance			
