= Wahid Majrooh =

Afghan minister

- وحید مجروح

Minister of Public Health of Afghanistan
- Acting; 29 January 2021 – September 2021
- Head of state: Ashraf Ghani; Hibatullah Akhundzada
- Preceded by: Ahmad Jawed Osmani
- Succeeded by: Qalandar Ibad

Personal details
- Born: 1985 (age 40–41) Shindand District, Democratic Republic of Afghanistan
- Education: Herat University (MD); Payame Noor University (MA); London School of Hygiene & Tropical Medicine (MSc)
- Occupation: Physician

Wahid Majrooh (وحید مجروح; born 1985) served as the acting Minister of Public Health of Afghanistan. Hailing from Shindand District, he received his medical degree from Herat University in 2008. He received a master's degree in political science from Payame Noor University and a master's degree in global health policy from the London School of Hygiene & Tropical Medicine.
