= Afghanistan at the 2019 World Aquatics Championships =

- Flag of Afghanistan
- FINA code: AFG
- National federation: Afghanistan National Swimming Federation

in Gwangju, South Korea
- Competitors: 2 in 1 sport
- Medals: Gold 0 Silver 0 Bronze 0 Total 0

World Aquatics Championships appearances
- 1973; 1975; 1978; 1982; 1986; 1991; 1994; 1998; 2001; 2003; 2005; 2007; 2009; 2011; 2013; 2015; 2017; 2019; 2022; 2023; 2024

Afghanistan competed at the 2019 World Aquatics Championships in Gwangju, South Korea from 12 to 28 July.

== Swimming ==
Afghanistan sent two swimmers.

Men

Athlete	Event	Heat		Semifinal		Final	
Athlete	Event	Time	Rank	Time	Rank	Time	Rank
Hedayatullah Noorzad	50 m backstroke	39.09	73	did not advance			
Hedayatullah Noorzad	100 m backstroke	1:31.35	63	did not advance			
Hamid Rahimi	50 m freestyle	30.79	129	did not advance			
Hamid Rahimi	50 m breaststroke	37.48	74	did not advance			
