= Yazdan =

Yazdan or Yezdan (Persian: یزدان Yazdān, "The Divine") may refer to:

== Given name ==
- Yazdan Abbasian (born 1992), Iranian footballer
- Yazdan Khan, Pakistani army officer
- Yazdan-Friy Shapur, 4th-century Sasanian queen
- Yazdan Yazdanpanah (born 1965), Iranian-American infectiologist

== Places ==
- Yezdan, Fars, a village in central Iran
- Hesar-e Yazdan, a village in eastern Iran
- Yazdelan, or Yazdan, (يزدلان), a village in central Iran

== See also ==
- Yazd, the capital of Yazd Province in central Iran
- Yazdani (disambiguation)
- Yazdânism, a Kurdish religion
- yazata, Zoroastrian Iranian divine entities from which the words Yazdan or Yezdan derive
