= Katamak, Hirmand =

Katamak كتمك
- Village
- Location within Iran
- Coordinates: 31°13′17″N 61°44′24″E
- Country: Iran
- Province: Sistan and Baluchestan
- County: Hirmand
- Bakhsh: Qorqori
- Rural District: Qorqori

Population (2006)
  - Total: 308
- Time zone: UTC+3:30 (IRST)
  - Summer (DST): UTC+4:30 (IRDT)

Katamak (Persian: كتمك, also Romanized as Katemak; also known as Katemag) is a village in Qorqori Rural District, Qorqori District, Hirmand County, Sistan and Baluchestan Province, Iran. At the 2006 census, its population was 308, in 66 families.
