= Taimani =

Taimani تایمنی
- Neighborhood of Kabul
- Coordinates: 34°33′N 69°09′E
- Country: Afghanistan
- Province: Kabul Province

Taimani (Dari: تایمنی), also spelled Taimany and also called Proja-e-Taimany or Taimani Project, is a locality in north-western Kabul, Afghanistan. It forms part of administrative District 4. Taimani is located near Shahr-e-Naw, Kolola Pushta and Khair Khana.

== Education ==
The Kardan University is located in Taimani. The Nazar Zulmai's Science and English Language Learning Center is located in this district.

== Wedding halls ==
There are also a number of popular wedding halls in and around Taimani.

== Postal code ==
The postal code of Taimani is 1007.
