= Islam Qala District =

Islam Qala is a district in Herat Province, Afghanistan.
