= Afghanistan National Swimming Federation =

Governing body of swimming in Afghanistan

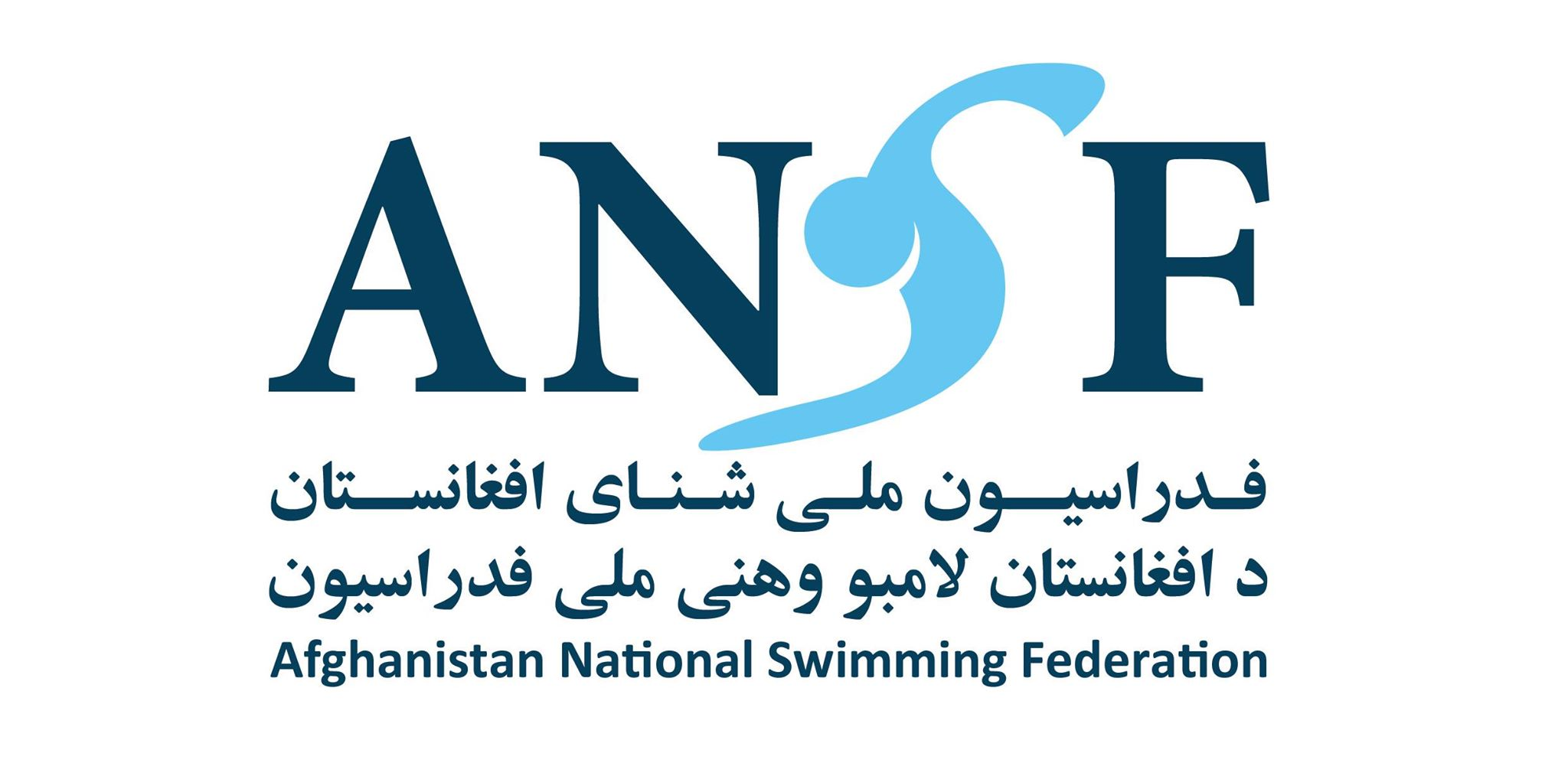
- Sport: Aquatics
- Jurisdiction: National
- Abbreviation: ANSF
- Founded: 2004
- Affiliation: FINA
- Regional affiliation: AASF
- President: Sayed Ihsanuddin Taheri
- (Afghanistan)

Afghanistan National Swimming Federation (ANSF) is an active member of the International Swimming Federation (FINA) and Asia Swimming Federation (AASF). In Afghanistan, it is affiliated to the National Olympic Committee. It operates in conformity with the organization's charter accepted by FINA and AASF. It was established in 2004.

ANSF presently has its offices in 8 provinces of Afghanistan namely: Kabul, Herat, Balkh, Diakondi, Badakhshan, Baghlan, Ghor and Panjshir.

Afghanistan National Swimming Federation has managed to get involved in the regional, Continental and World level event and discussions on this swimming. For the first time in the history, Afghanistan swimming team attended the world Championships held in Hungary in July 2017 with two swimmers attending the event.

Afghanistan became one of the first countries of FINA members to host the First FINA World Aquatics Day in Kabul in July 2017.

Afghanistan Swimming Federation is working on developing a master plan for the next three years for development of this sport in the country. In the 2017 FINA elections, Afghanistan National Swimming President Sayed Ihsanuddin Taheri was elected member of the FINA Media Committee for the period of 2017-2021 alongside China and Oman to represent Asia on the committee.

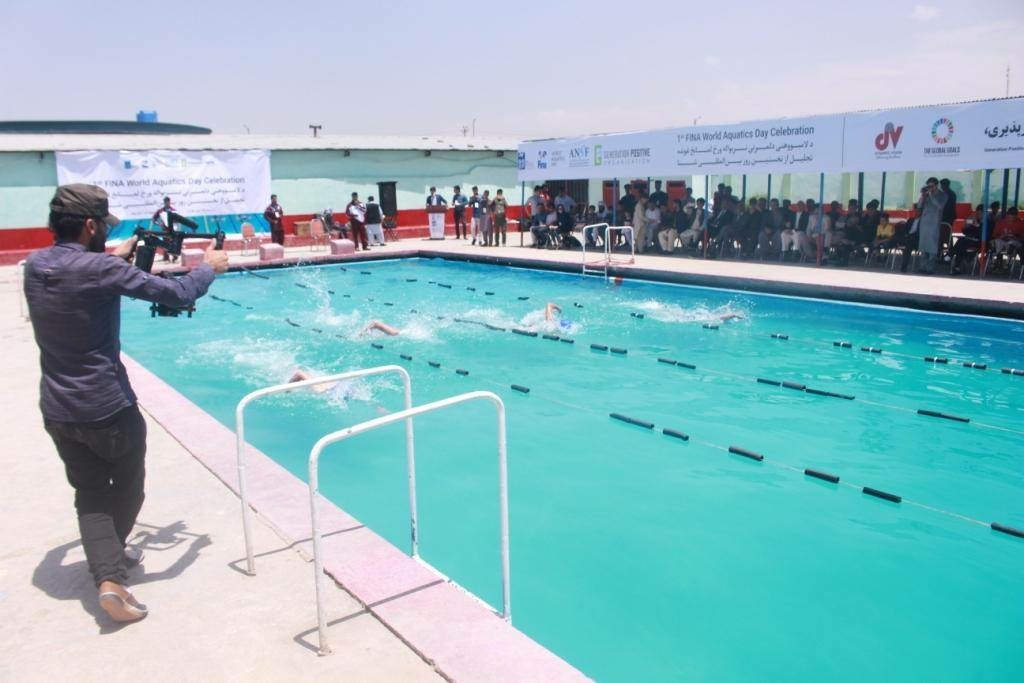
First FINA World Aquatics Day celebration in Kabul - July 2017

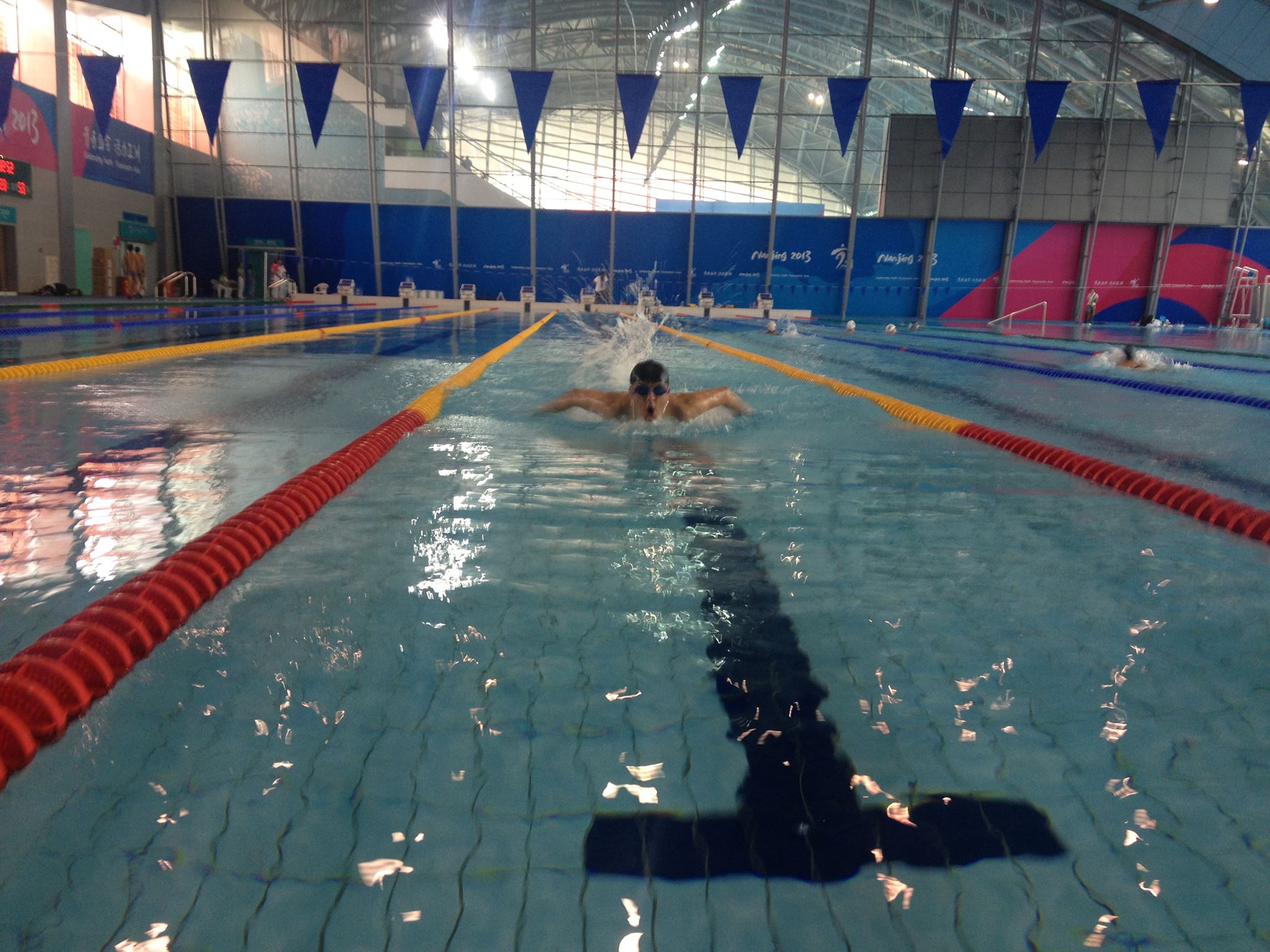
Hamid Rahimi, Afghanistan Swimmer preparing for World Swimming Championship in Kabul - July 2017
