= Ministry of Public Health (Afghanistan) =

Afghanistan governmental body responsible for public health

- وزارت صحت عامه افغانستان (Dari) د افغانستان د عامې روغتیا وزارت (Pashto)
- Ministry emblem

- Ministry flag

Agency overview
- Jurisdiction: Government of Afghanistan
- Headquarters: Charahi-e-Masoud, Airport Road Kabul, Afghanistan
- Minister responsible: Maulawi Noor Jalal
- Deputy Ministers responsible: Mohammad Hassan Ghiasi; Maulvi Mohammad Ishaq
- Website: http://moph.gov.af/en

The Ministry of Public Health (Dari: وزارت صحت عامه افغانستان; Pashto: د افغانستان د عامې روغتیا وزارت) is the ministry of the government of Afghanistan which deals with matters concerning the health of Afghanistan's population. As of 2021 the acting minister of Health was Dr. Wahid Majrooh until Taliban Takeover of Kabul. The Ministry of Public Health provides an annual report to inform the public of advancements in Afghanistan's health sector.

== The ministry ==
Following the U.S. invasion of Afghanistan the Ministry of Health, along with the World Health Organization and other technical partners and donors reconstructed the health sector. At the time, at least 70% of the Afghan population was dependent on health services provided by the international community. Almost six million Afghans had no or very little access to medical care. In addition, 50 of the country's 330 districts had no health facilities whatsoever.

The goal of the ministry is to develop the health sector to improve the health of the people of Afghanistan, especially women and children, through implementing the basic package of health services (BPHS) and the essential package of hospital services (EPHS) as the standard, agreed-upon minimum of health care to be provided at each level of the health system. It wants to reduce the high levels of mortality and morbidity by:

- 1) Improving access to quality emergency and routine reproductive and child health services,
- 2) Increasing the coverage and quality of services to prevent and treat communicable diseases and malnutrition among children and adults
- 3) Strengthening institutional development and management at central and provincial levels to ensure the effective and cost-efficient delivery of quality health services and
- 4) Further developing the capacity of health personnel to manage and better deliver quality health services.

== Ministers ==
Name	Term	Notes
Kubra Noorzai	1965–1969	First female minister in Afghanistan
Abdul Rauf Mohammad	1996–1999	Acting, under Muhammed Omar
Mohammad Abbas Akhund	1996–2001	Under Muhammed Omar
Sher Mohammad Abbas Stanikzai	1996–2001	Deputy minister, under Muhammed Omar
Suhayla Seddiqi	2001–2004	
Sayed Mohammad Amin Fatimi	2004–2010	Was renominated in 2010 but did not receive approval from the Wolesi Jirga
Suraya Dalil	2010–2014	Initially did not receive approval from the Afghan Parliament and was appointed acting minister before being confirmed in 2012
Ferozuddin Feroz	2015–2019	Received formal approval from the Afghan Parliament and became the official confirmed minister
Ahmad Jawad Osmani	May – December 2020	Received formal approval from the Afghan Parliament but was quickly forcefully ousted by then president Ashraf Ghani on corruption charges of the ministry employees
Wahid Majrooh	January 2021 – September 2021	Acting minister of health
Qalandar Ibad	September 2021 – May 2024	Acting minister of health
Maulawi Noor Jalal	May 2024 – present	Acting minister of health

Previous Ministers of Public Health:

- Dr. Fatimie Minister of Public Health May, (1993-1995),

Minister of Public Health (2004- 2010),

- Suraya Dalil Planning Deputy Minister and acting Minister (20100118),

nominated again as Minister MoPH (20120215)

- Soraya Dalil Minister of Public Health MoPH (20120305 -20140930)
- Suraya Dalil acting Minister (20140930)
- acting Minister of Public Health Ahmad Jan Naim (20141209)
- Firuzuddin Firuz (20150127 - 2020602)
- Ahmad Jawad Osmani (20200602) nominated and acting, confirmed (20201202) fired
- Dr. Waheed Majroh (20210129) appointed and acting
- Dr. Qalandar Ibad Qalandar Ebad (20210921) acting
- Noor Jalal Jalali (20240528)

Deputy Minister:

- Dr. Abdul Bari Omar (20210921, 20230502)
- deputy director of the provincial Public Health Department, Dr. Naqibullah Fateh (20230312)

Second Deputy Minister:

- Dr. Hassan Gheyasi Hassan Ghiasi, Hazara, (20210921)
- Nadera Hayat Nadera Hayat Borhani (20110317, 20110824)
- Dr. Ahmad Jan Naeem Ahmad Jan Naim (20161009, 20171109)
- Mrs. Diwa Samad (20181104) 23 years old Dewa Samad became the country's youngest-ever deputy minister when she was appointed to her post in the Health Ministry in October 2018.(20200416 fired)
- Mamozai Zewar (20190310,20200416 fired)
- Feda Muhammad Paikan (20171228,20180620, 20191015, 20200329, 20200416 fired)
