= Torkham =

Torkham تورخم
- Town
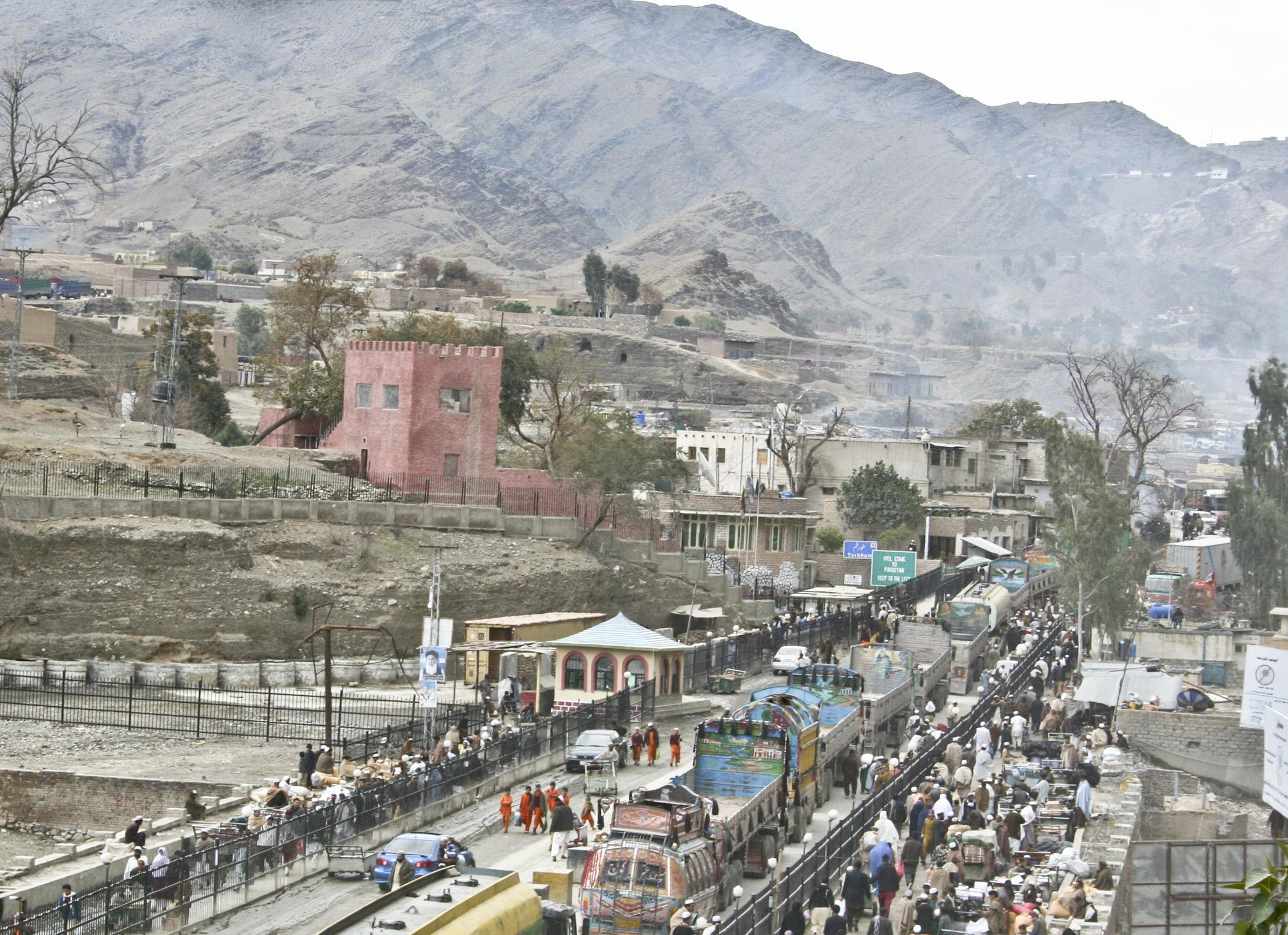
- Torkham Border Crossing

- Location within Khyber Pakhtunkhwa
- Coordinates: 34°7′18″N 71°6′11″E
- Country: Pakistan
- Province: Khyber Pakhtunkhwa
- District: Khyber
- Time zone: UTC+05:00 (PST)

Torkham (Pashto: تورخم, romanized: torxam; Urdu: طورخم) is a Pakistani town in Khyber District (until 2018 the Khyber Agency of the now defunct FATA), that is the location of the Torkham Border Crossing with Afghanistan just to the west of the historic Khyber Pass.

Torkham lies at the end of the N-5 National Highway. It is connected to the city of Peshawar in the east. Transported goods arrive at Torkham from the port city of Karachi in Sindh province. Torkham is 5 kilometres (3.1 mi) west of the summit of the Khyber Pass. It lies on the most important supply route for US-led NATO forces in Afghanistan. Pakistan's government sometimes block supplies due to the American use of drone strikes in Pakistan, and for security reasons after firing from the Afghan side against Pakistani construction workers building a border fence. By the end of 2018, Pakistan had completed a 486 kilometer portion of the border fence around Torkham to seal the porous border in order to curb arms smuggling, illegal migration, and drug trafficking.

Throughout history it has been an important trade route between the South Asia and Central Asia and a strategic military location. The adjacent town on the other side of border in Afghanistan is also known as Torkham. Torkham was the first point of entry into Pakistan for many of the 3.5 million Afghans who fled the Soviet invasion as refugees.

== Climate ==
With an influence from the local steppe climate, Torkham features a hot semi-arid climate (Köppen BSh). The average temperature in Torkham is 20.3 °C, while the annual precipitation averages 407 mm. June is the driest month with an average rainfall of 8 mm, while the wettest month is March, with an average 82 mm of precipitation.

June is the hottest month of the year with an average temperature of 31.0 °C. The coldest month January has an average temperature of 8.4 °C.

Climate data for Torkham
Month	Jan	Feb	Mar	Apr	May	Jun	Jul	Aug	Sep	Oct	Nov	Dec	Year
Mean daily maximum °C (°F)	14.5 (58.1)	16.3 (61.3)	20.9 (69.6)	26.1 (79.0)	32.2 (90.0)	38.0 (100.4)	36.6 (97.9)	34.8 (94.6)	33.4 (92.1)	28.8 (83.8)	21.9 (71.4)	16.4 (61.5)	26.7 (80.0)
Daily mean °C (°F)	8.4 (47.1)	10.5 (50.9)	15.0 (59.0)	19.9 (67.8)	25.6 (78.1)	31.0 (87.8)	30.8 (87.4)	29.5 (85.1)	27.1 (80.8)	21.4 (70.5)	14.5 (58.1)	9.7 (49.5)	20.3 (68.5)
Mean daily minimum °C (°F)	2.3 (36.1)	4.7 (40.5)	9.1 (48.4)	13.7 (56.7)	18.7 (65.7)	24.0 (75.2)	25.1 (77.2)	24.2 (75.6)	20.8 (69.4)	14.1 (57.4)	7.2 (45.0)	3.1 (37.6)	13.9 (57.1)
Source: Climate-Data.org
