= Fahim Anwari =

Afghan swimmer

Personal information
- Nationality: Afghanistan
- Born: 5 May 1999 (age 27) Kabul, Afghanistan

Sport
- Sport: Swimming

Fahim Anwari (Persian/ Dari: فهیم انوری) is an Afghan swimmer with two Afghan national records. He is a member of Afghanistan's national swimming team. During the COVID-19 pandemic in Afghanistan, Anwari trained at Qargha Lake. In April 2021, Afghanistan National Olympic Committee announced that Anwari will become the first swimmer to represent Afghanistan at the Olympics. Anwari received financial support from the IOC for his preparations for the Olympics.

== Career ==
In January 2021, Anwari began training at the FINA Development Centre in Kazan, Russia. In April 2021, he set two Afghan national records after being part of the FINA Development program in Kazan. At the 2020 Olympic Games, he finished 69th in the men's 50 m freestyle.
