= Mullah Ghani =

Afghan politician (died 2014)

Mullah Ghani served briefly as the Taliban-appointed governor of Nimruz Province, Afghanistan in 1995. Ghani was culturally similar to his predecessor, Hamidullah Niyazmand. Ghani was removed from power when Jamaat forces counter-attacked the capital city of Zaranj later in 1995.

Preceded by Hamidullah Niyazmand	Governor of Nimruz Province; 1995	Succeeded by Sher Malang
