= Kandahar–Herat Highway =

Road in Afghanistan

Location
- Country: Afghanistan

Highway system
- Transport in Afghanistan

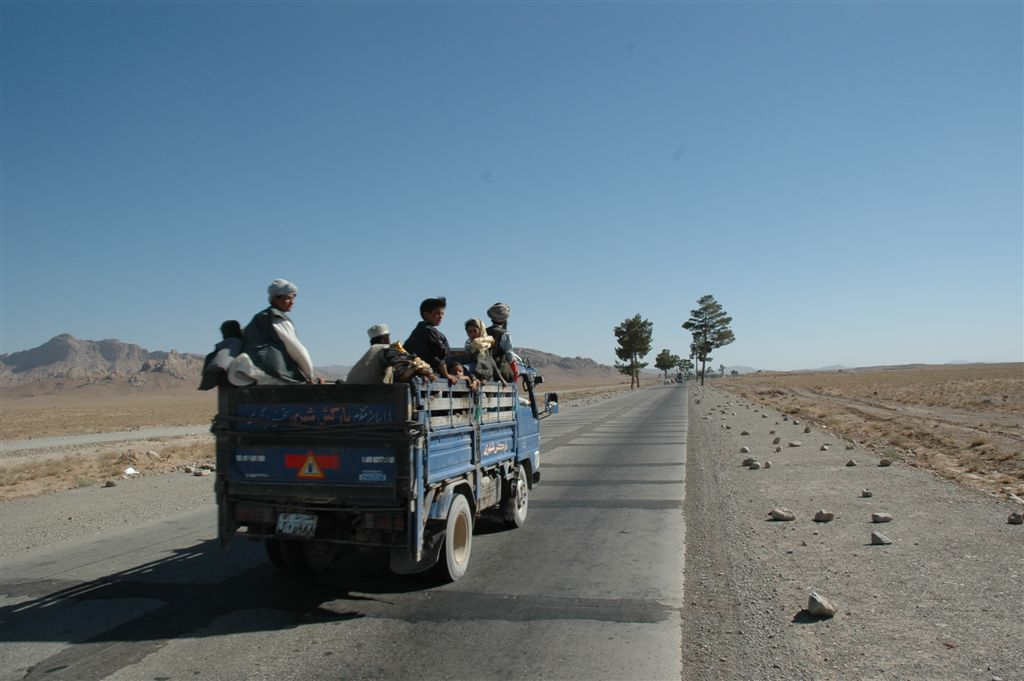
A small truck travels on Kandahar-Herat highway.

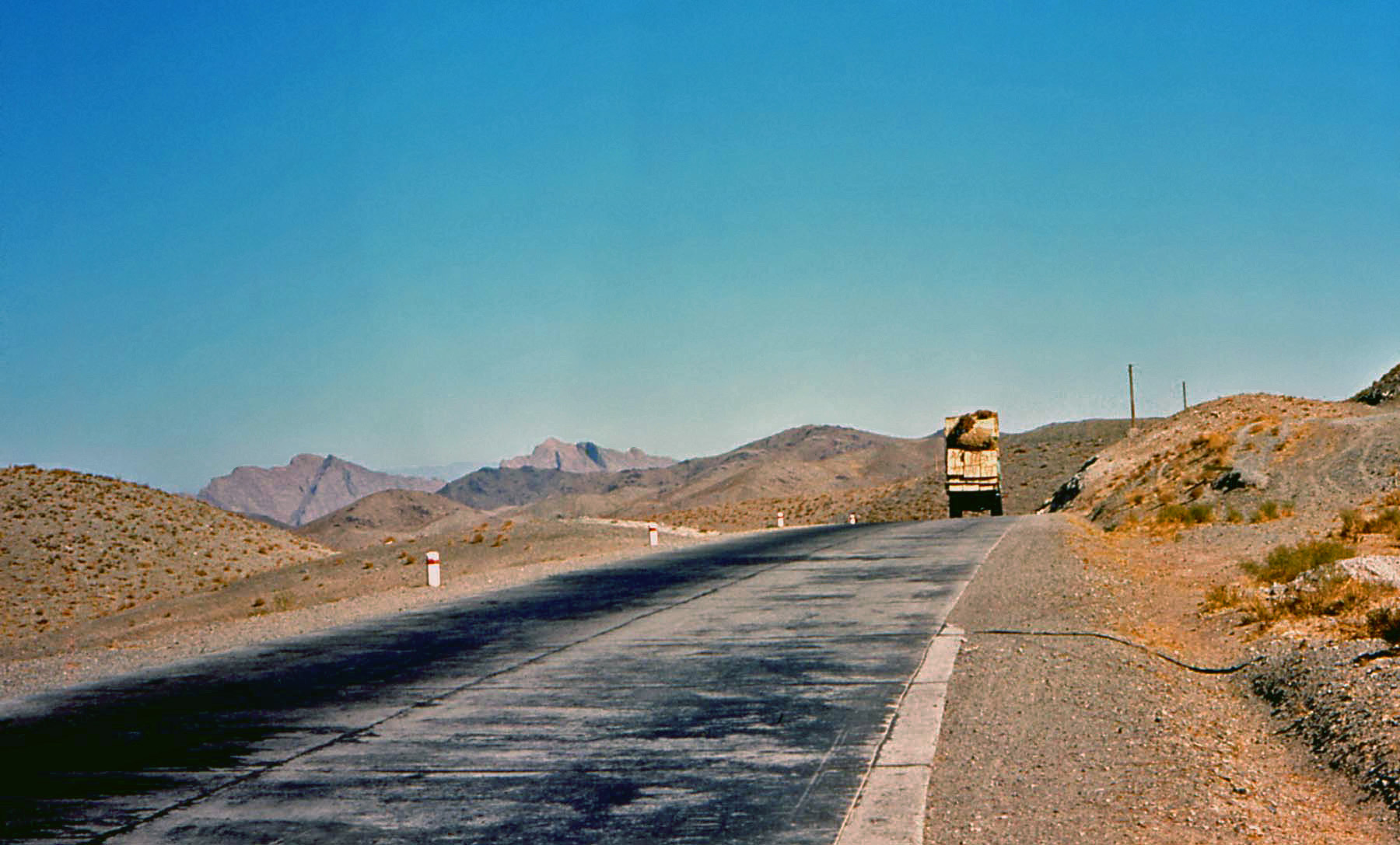
Part of the road in the 1960s.

The Kandahar–Herat Highway is a 557-kilometer (346 mi) section of road that links the cities of Kandahar and Herat in Afghanistan. This highway is part of a larger road network called the "Ring Road", and was first constructed by the Soviets in the 1960s. The Kandahar-Herat Highway is made up of two sections of "National Highway 1": NH0101 between Kandahar and Girishk, and NH0102 between Girishk and Herat.

== History ==
In October 2004 reconstruction of the highway began and was expected to be completed by the end of 2006. The United States was funding a 326 km (203 mi) portion of the road, Saudi Arabia was funding a 115 km (71 mi) section and Japan contributing to rebuilding 116 km (72 mi). The U.S. portion of the Kandahar-Herat highway reduced travel time between those two major cities from 10 hours to 4.3 hours.

== Connectivity with Route 606: Delaram-Zaranj Highway ==
The Delaram–Zaranj Highway, also known as Route 606, is a 217-kilometer-long (135 mi) two-lane road built by India in Afghanistan, connecting Delaram in Farah Province with Zaranj in neighbouring Nimruz Province near the Iranian border. It connects the Afghan–Iranian border with the Kandahar–Herat Highway in Delaram, which provides connectivity to other major Afghan cities via A01. Route 606 reduces travel time between Delaram and Zaranj from the earlier 12–14 hours to just 2 hours.

== See also ==
- Kabul-Kandahar Highway
