= Route 515 (Afghanistan) =

Road in Afghanistan

Location
- Country: Afghanistan

Highway system
- Transport in Afghanistan

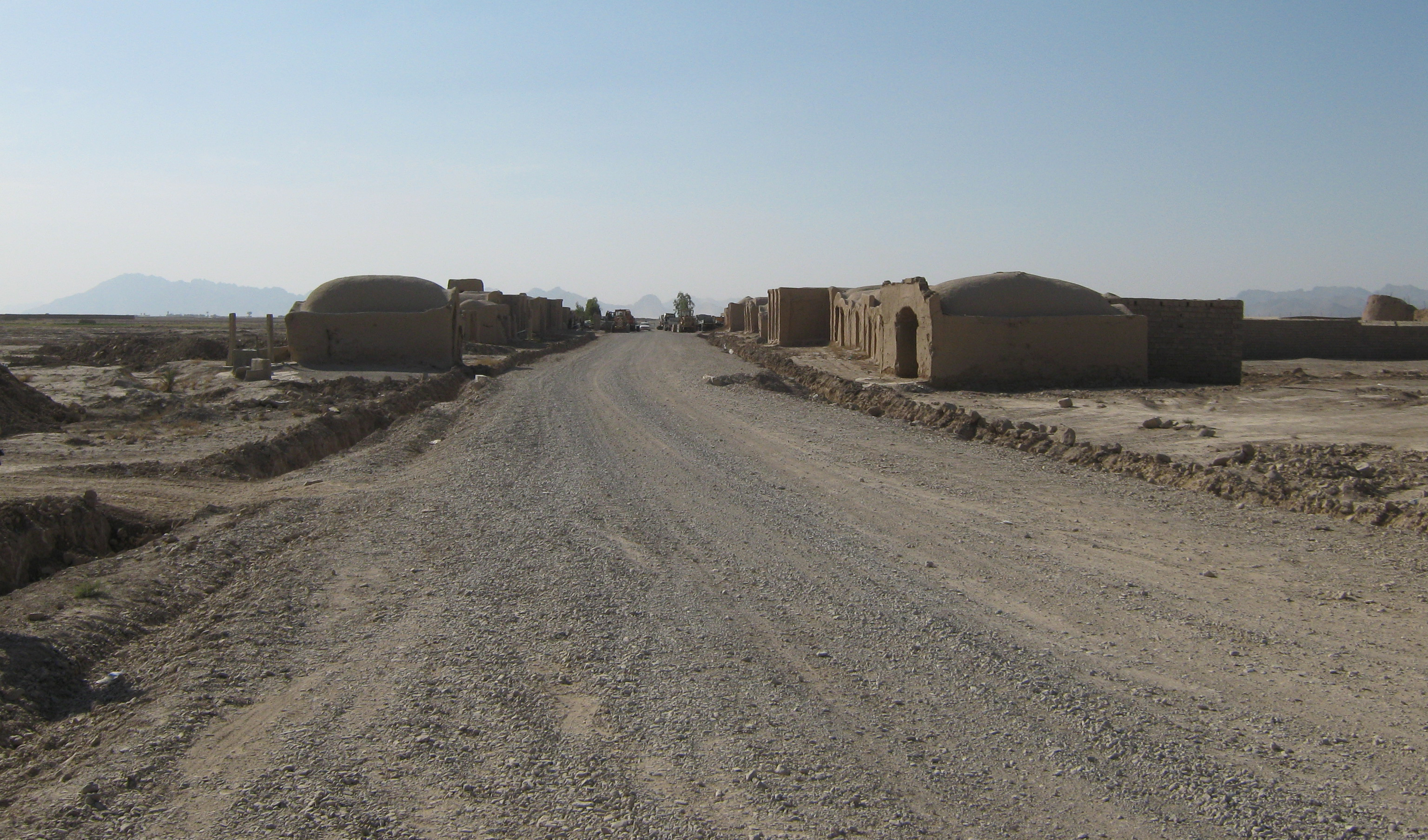
Bakwa District Center on Route 515

Route 515 is the main road in Bakwa District in Farah Province in southwestern Afghanistan. It is a compact gravel road that travels east–west and connects Delaram on the east terminus with Farah City on the west terminus. The road is about 75 kilometers long and about 38 kilometers from Delaram to the Bakwa District Center.

== Route ==
The Delaram end of the road starts at Highway 1 or Ring Road. The route intersects with Route 606 near Delaram and passes through the Bakwa District Center.

=== Key points ===
- East terminus (Delaram at Highway 1): 32°09′40.99″N 63°25′56.00″E
- Intersection with Route 606: 32°09′45.55″N 63°22′41.78″E
- Bakwa District Center: 32°14′25.99″N 62°56′55.07″E
- West terminus (Farah City): 32°22′35.21″N 62°07′16.08″E

== History ==
In 2009, it was under major improvement by an Afghan contracting company and was expected to be completed in June 2010.
