= Nimruz University =

University in Zaranj, Afghanistan

- پوهنتون نیمروز / د نیمروز پوهنتون
- Established: 2017
- Chancellor: Mufti Bessmellah Bassam
- Location: Zaranj, Nimruz province, Afghanistan
- Website: nimu.edu.af

Nimruz University (Pashto: د نیمروز پوهنتون, Dari: پوهنتون نیمروز) is a public university in Zaranj, which is the capital of Nimruz Province in southwestern Afghanistan. It is located in the eastern part of the city, near the Zaranj-Delaram Highway. The university was established in 2017 by the Ministry of Higher Education, which is headquartered in Kabul. Mufti Bessmellah Bassam is the current chancellor.

== Faculties ==
The following faculties are available at Nimruz University:

1. Agriculture
2. Education
3. Economics
4. Sharia and Islamic Studies

== See also ==
- List of universities in Afghanistan
