= Delaram =

City in Nimruz Province, Afghanistan

- City
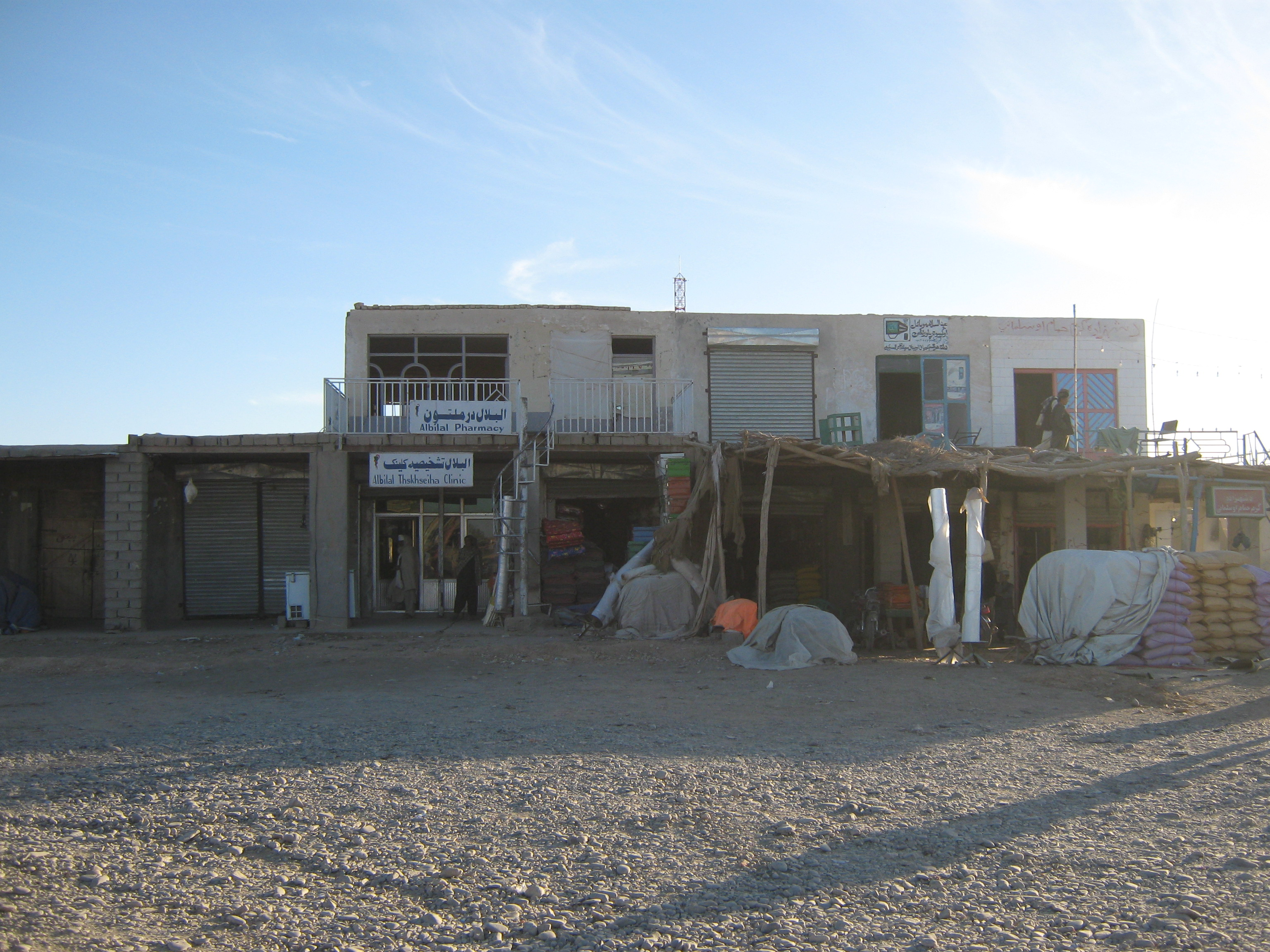
- Delaram Bazaar

- Location in Afghanistan
- Coordinates: 32°09′50″N 63°25′51″E
- Country: Afghanistan
- Province: Nimruz Province
- Elevation: 817 m (2,680 ft)

Delārām (Pashto/Persian: دلارام) is a city in the northern part of Nimruz Province, in southern Afghanistan. It is a major transportation center, with several major road converging on the area, including Kandahar–Herat Highway (part of the Ring Road), Route 515 to Farah, Route 522 to Gulistan and Route 606 to Iran. The district center contains a large bazaar.

== History ==
Delaram was initially a city in Khash Rod District in Nimruz Province, but was administratively transferred to Farah Province in 2007 for a short time as a separate district. Delaram transitioned to Farah Province following a period of violence between ISAF and the Taliban, in which the Afghan Border Police were brought in to restore order. Delaram was then transferred back to Nimruz Province and remained a separate district of Nimruz.

== Climate ==
Delaram has a hot desert climate (Köppen BWh), characterised by little precipitation and high variation between summer and winter temperatures. The average temperature in Delaram is 18.9 °C, while the annual precipitation averages 106 mm. July is the hottest month of the year with an average temperature of 31.9 °C. The coldest month January has an average temperature of 6.1 °C.

Climate data for Delaram
Month	Jan	Feb	Mar	Apr	May	Jun	Jul	Aug	Sep	Oct	Nov	Dec	Year
Mean daily maximum °C (°F)	13.2 (55.8)	15.9 (60.6)	22.4 (72.3)	27.7 (81.9)	33.9 (93.0)	39.4 (102.9)	40.8 (105.4)	39.2 (102.6)	34.5 (94.1)	28.4 (83.1)	20.9 (69.6)	15.3 (59.5)	27.6 (81.7)
Daily mean °C (°F)	6.1 (43.0)	8.8 (47.8)	14.8 (58.6)	19.6 (67.3)	25.1 (77.2)	30.0 (86.0)	31.9 (89.4)	29.7 (85.5)	24.4 (75.9)	18.4 (65.1)	11.5 (52.7)	7.1 (44.8)	19.0 (66.1)
Mean daily minimum °C (°F)	−1.0 (30.2)	1.7 (35.1)	7.2 (45.0)	11.6 (52.9)	16.3 (61.3)	20.6 (69.1)	23.0 (73.4)	20.2 (68.4)	14.4 (57.9)	8.5 (47.3)	2.2 (36.0)	−1.0 (30.2)	10.3 (50.6)
Source: Climate-Data.org

== Delaram US Military Base ==
Forward Operating Base Delaram, with elements of the ANA 215th Corps and U.S. Marines, was located near the town of Delaram. The base was transferred to the Afghan National Army in April 2014 and later became the headquarters of 4th Brigade, 215th Corps, which was formed in 2012, prior to the Taliban takeover in 2021.

== Route 606: Delaram-Zaranj Highway ==
Indian and Pakistani embassy and consulates in Afghanistan in red

The Delaram–Zaranj Highway, also known as Route 606, is a 217-km or 135-mile-long two-lane road built by India in Afghanistan, connecting Delaram in Farah Province with Zaranj in neighbouring Nimruz Province near the Iranian border. It connects the Afghan–Iranian border with the Kandahar–Herat Highway in Delaram, which provides connectivity to other major Afghan cities via A01, including to India's planned mining operation in Hajigak mining concession. Route 606 reduces travel time between Delaram and Zaranj from the earlier 12–14 hours to just 2 hours. India-Iran signed an agreement in May 2016 to connect it to Port of Chabahar with rail and road links.
