= Route 522 (Afghanistan) =

Road in Afghanistan

Location
- Country: Afghanistan

Highway system
- Transport in Afghanistan

Route 522 is the main road in Gulistan District in Farah Province, Afghanistan. Construction of the 40 km (25 mi) dirt road was proposed by U.S. Marines in 2009 to connect Gulistan with Delaram. It was expected to undergo major improvements to make it a compacted gravel road starting in the summer of 2010.
