= Transport in Afghanistan =

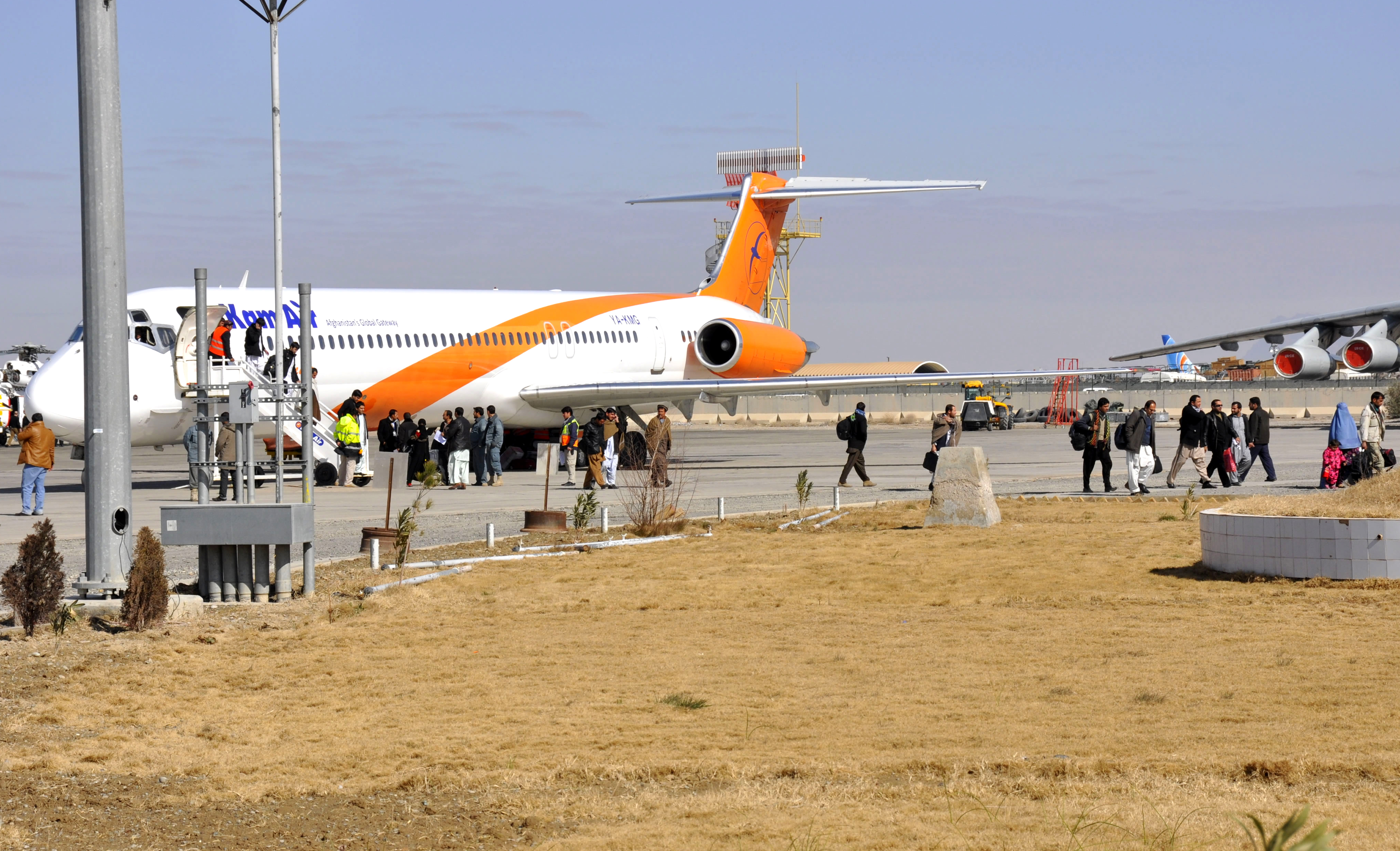
A Kam Air passenger plane at the Ahmad Shah Baba International Airport in Kandahar, Afghanistan

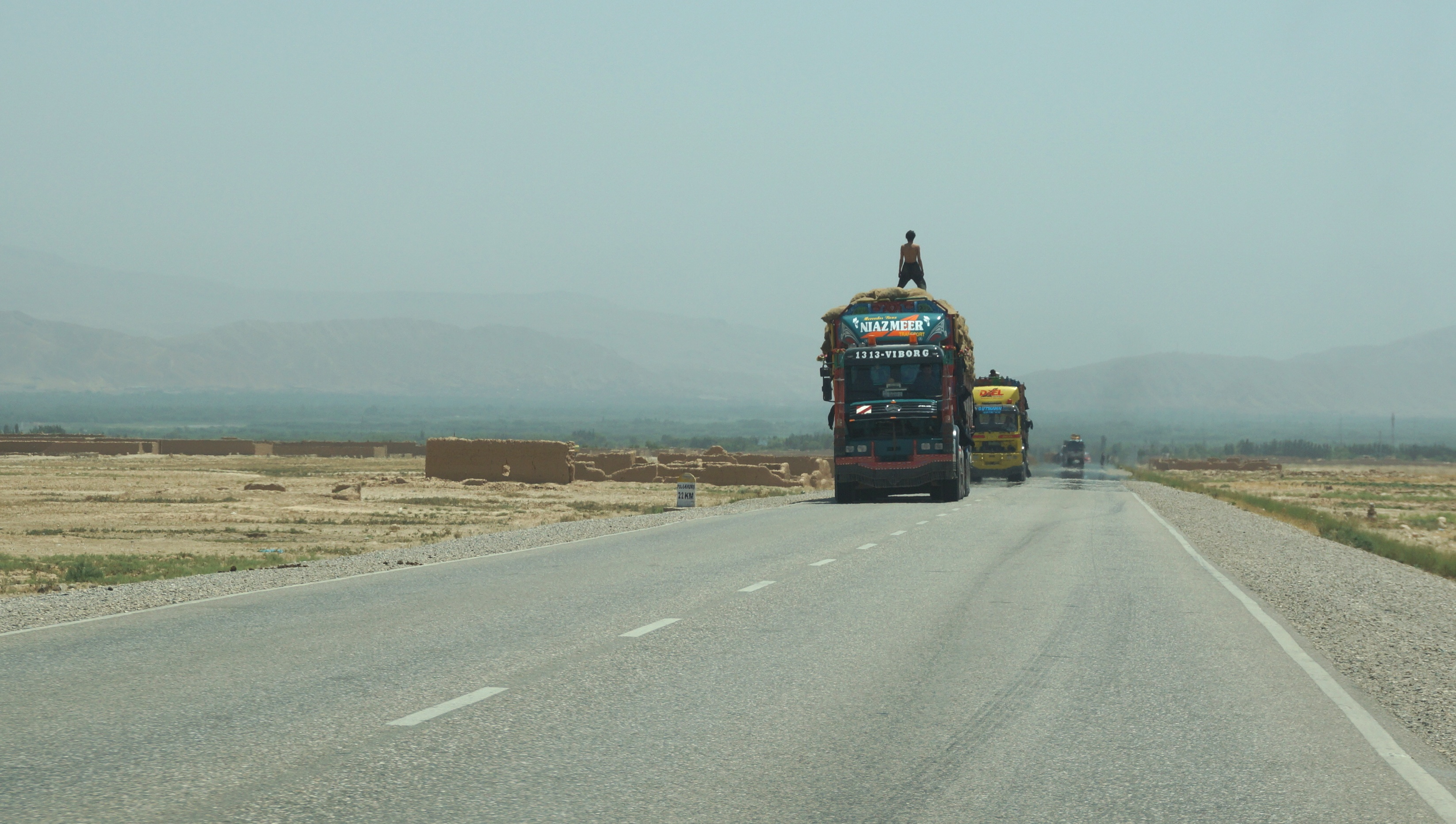
Trucks on a highway in northern Afghanistan

Transport in Afghanistan is done mostly by road, rail, and air. Much of the nation's road network was built in the mid-20th century but left to ruin during the last two decades of that century due to war and political turmoil. Officials of the current Islamic Emirate have continued to improve the national highways, roads, and bridges. In 2008, there were about 700,000 vehicles registered in Kabul.

Landlocked Afghanistan has no seaports, but the Amu River, which forms part of the nation's border with Turkmenistan, Uzbekistan and Tajikistan, does have substantial traffic. Rebuilding and expanding its airports, roads, rail network, and land ports has led to rapid economic growth in recent years. There are 68 airports in Afghanistan as of 2025.

== Road ==
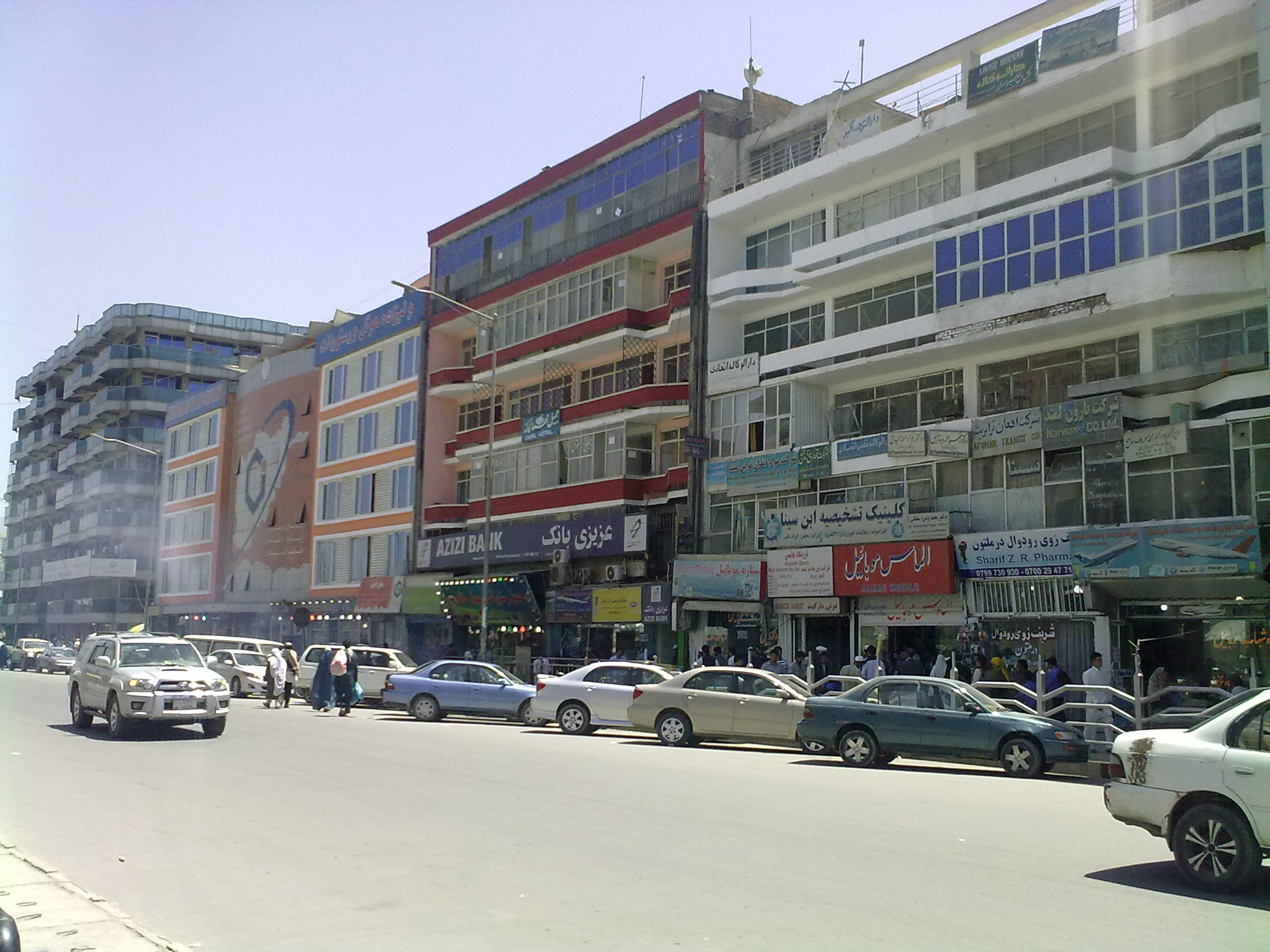
A street scene in Kabul

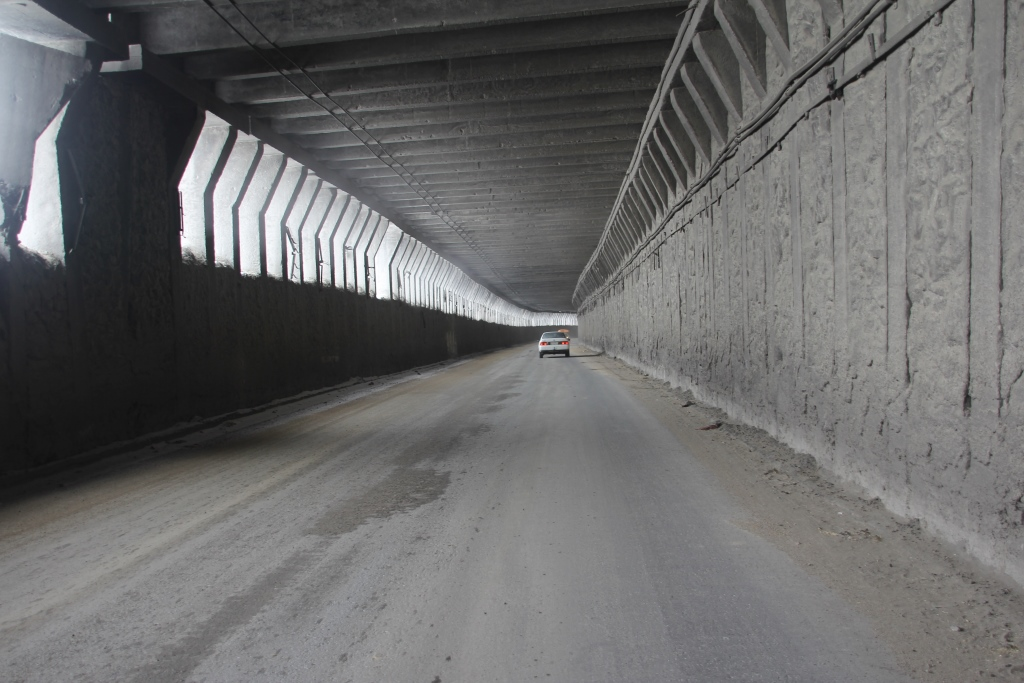
Inside one of the avalanche galleries at the Salang Pass in 2013

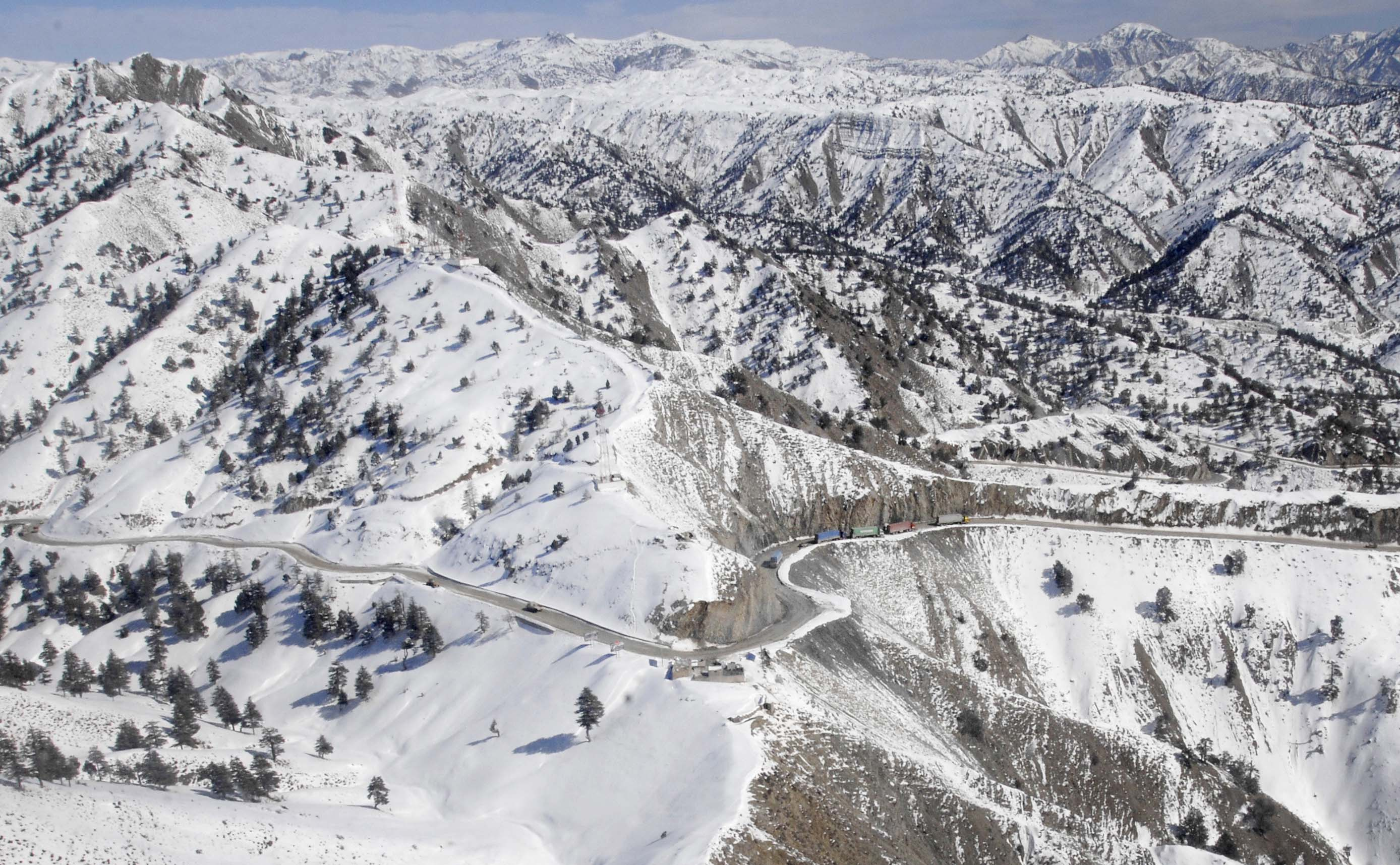
The Khost-Gardez Pass in eastern Afghanistan

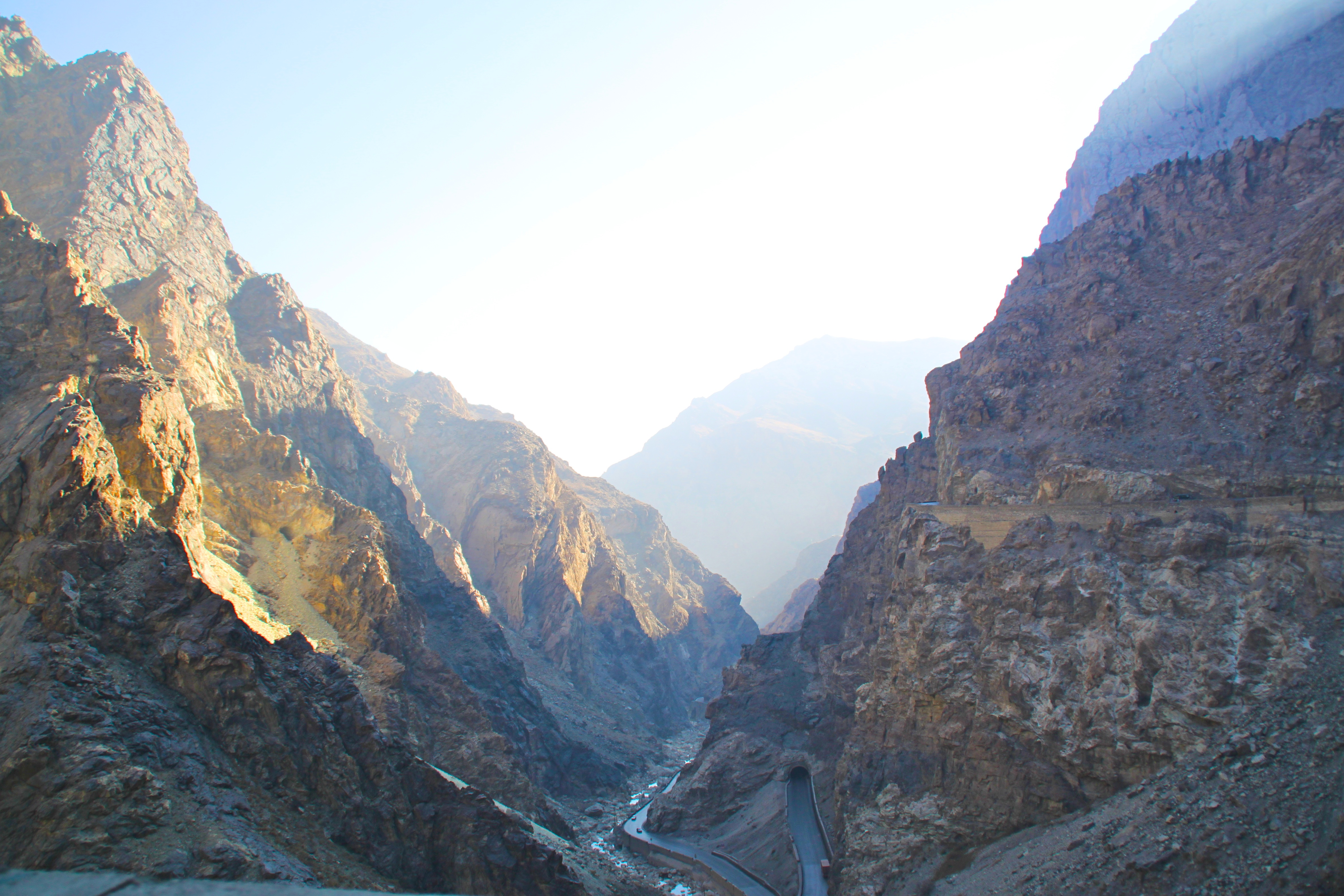
View of the Kabul-Jalalabad Road

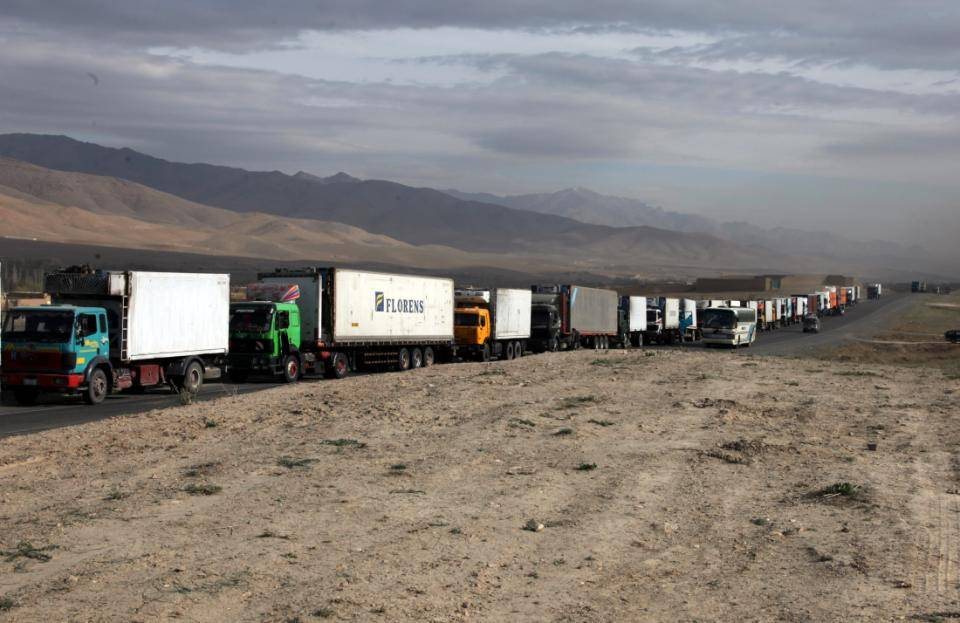
The Kabul–Kandahar Highway at Saydabad District of Maidan Wardak Province in 2010

Most major highways were paved around the mid-20th century with technical assistance from the United States and the Soviet Union. Engineers from the Soviet Union built a highway and tunnel through the Salang pass in the 1960s, connecting northern and eastern Afghanistan. A highway connecting the principal cities of Herat, Mazar-i-Sharif, Lashkar Gah, Kandahar, Ghazni, Kabul and Jalalabad, with links to highways in neighboring Pakistan originally formed the primary road system of Afghanistan.

As of 2026, Afghanistan has 18,241 km (11,334 mi) of paved roads and 226,831 km (140,946 mi) of unpaved roads, for an approximate total road system of 245,072 km (152,281 mi). Traffic in the country is right hand. In 2008, about 731,607 vehicles were registered in Kabul. At least 1,314 traffic collisions were reported in December 2022. Many vehicles in certain parts of the country are driven without registration plates. The Afghan government passed a law banning the import of cars older than 10 years. Toyota Corolla has been the most widely used vehicle in the country since the mid-1990s. Afghanistan recently began manufacturing its own microcars for domestic consumers. Long distant road journeys are made in private cars, vans, trucks and buses. Many of the national roads are currently being repaired and modernized.

=== Highways ===
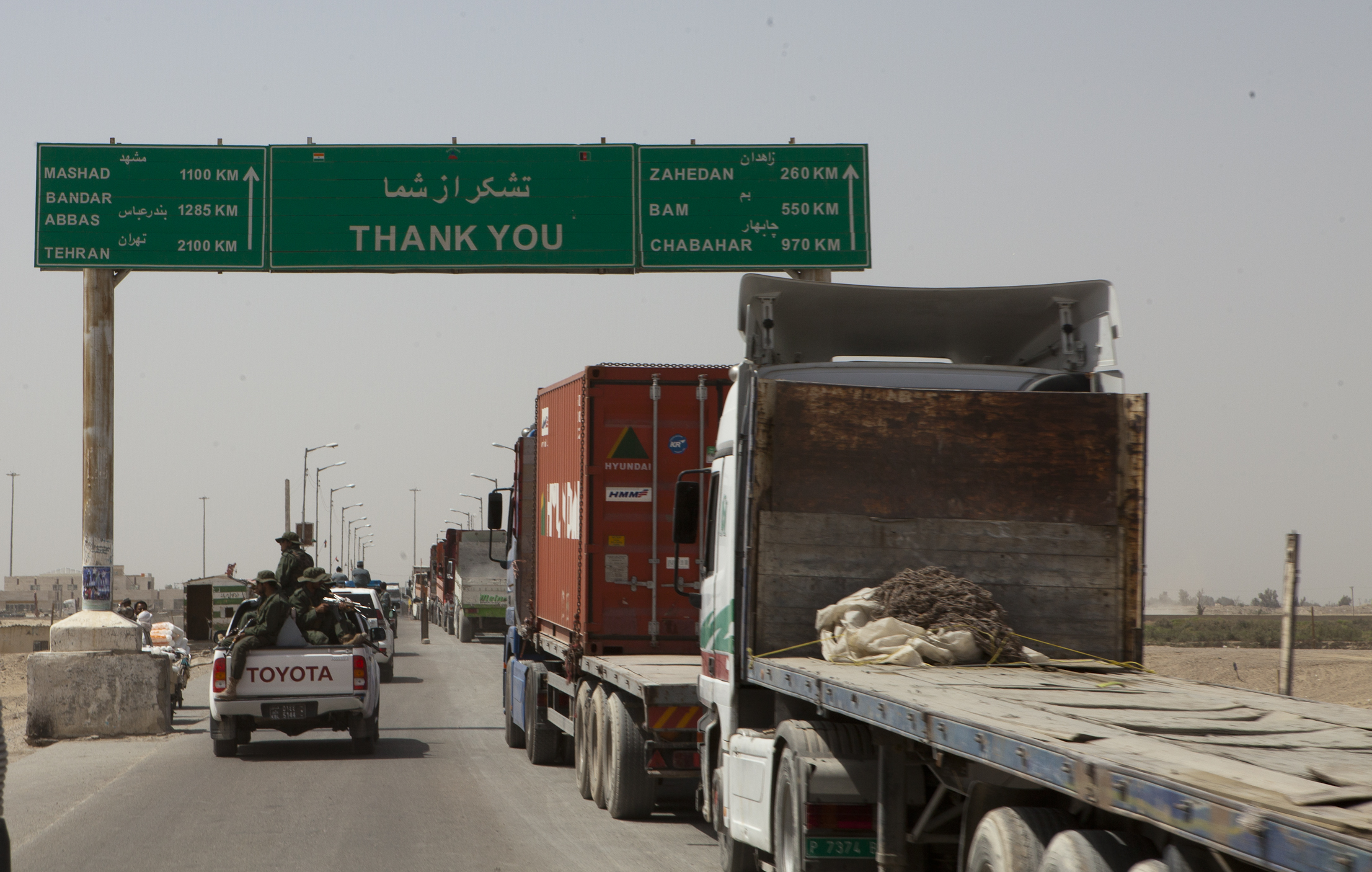
Traffic near the Afghanistan–Iran border in Zaranj

Afghanistan's highway system is going through a reconstruction phase, with major terminals and rest areas being added. Most of the regional roads are also being repaired and modernized.

The following is a partial list of the major highways in Afghanistan:

- Gardez–Pathan Highway in Paktia Province
- Jalalabad–Torkham Highway
- Kabul–Bamyan Highway
- Kabul–Kunduz Highway
- Kabul–Khost Highway
- Kabul–Ghor-Herat Highway
- Kabul–Jalalabad Road (A-1)
- Kabul–Herat Highway (A-77)
- Kabul–Kandahar Highway (A-1)
- Kabul–Mazar Highway (A-76)
- Kandahar–Bamyan Highway
- Kandahar–Boldak Highway
- Kandahar–Herat Highway
- Kandahar–Tarinkot Highway
- Kunduz-Khomri Highway
- Kunduz–Fayzabad Highway
- Herat–Islam Qala Highway
- Herat–Mazar Highway
- Route Trident (Lashkargah to Gereshk)
- Route 606 (Afghanistan)

=== Official border crossing points ===
There are over a dozen official border crossing points all around Afghanistan. They include Abu Nasar Port in Farah Province, Angur Ada in Paktika Province, Aqina in Faryab Province, Dand-aw-Patan in Paktia Province, Ghulam Khan in Khost Province, Hairatan in Balkh Province, Islam Qala in Herat Province, Ishkashim in Badakhshan Province, Sher Khan Bandar in Kunduz Province, Spin Boldak in Kandahar Province, Torghundi in Herat Province, Torkham in Nangarhar Province, and Zaranj in Nimruz Province. The Afghanistan-China border crossing at Wakhjir Pass in the Wakhan District is under development since 2021.

The Afghanistan-Tajikistan bridge at Sher Khan Bandar-Panji Poyon connects by road Afghanistan and Tajikistan. It was built by the United States Army Corps of Engineers (USACE) in 2007. The two countries are also connected by the smaller Tajik–Afghan bridge at Tem-Demogan. The Afghanistan–Uzbekistan Friendship Bridge connects Afghanistan by road with Uzbekistan. The Delaram-Zaranj Highway was constructed with Indian assistance and was inaugurated in January 2009.

=== Taxis, auto rickshaws, and urban public transport ===
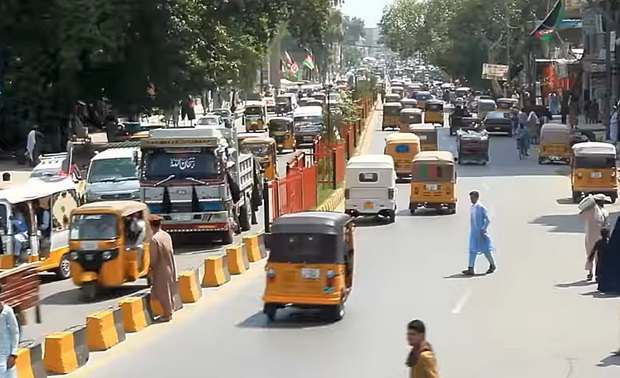
Auto rickshaws in Jalalabad

Due to the lack of a modern public urban transport systems, private buses, vans, taxis and auto rickshaws are popular in the major cities, the latter especially in Jalalabad, Herat, Kandahar, and Kunduz. In recent years, electric rickshaws and scooters have been introduced in Afghanistan. Kabul demanded a much needed public transport system in the 21st century with a rapid increase in traffic and population, but many projects were put on hold. The Kabul Municipality recently launched a bus system accompanied by bus stops, the city's first in decades. Many urban dwellers ride motorcycles, scooters and bicycles. Some people living in rural areas still use donkeys, mules and other animals for transportation purposes, especially in the mountainous terrain.

== Rail ==
Afghanistan has a total of four railway connections with three neighboring countries.

=== Afghanistan-Iran rail connections ===
A rail line from Khaf in Iran to the city of Herat in Afghanistan has been under construction since 2006. The Iranian line is a 1,435 mm (4 ft 8 1/2 in) standard gauge. In December 2020 the line had reached the Ghoryan District in Herat Province of Afghanistan. Shipment from China can now make its way to as far as Rozanak rail station, which is located about 71 km (44 mi) west of Herat. This railway line is being extended from the Rozanak station in Ghoryan District to the Khwaja Abdullah Ansari International Airport in the Guzara District. From there it will be extended all the way to Kandahar Province in the southeast and Balkh Province in the west.

=== Afghanistan-Turkmenistan rail connections ===
A 10-kilometer-long 1,520 mm (4 ft 11 27/32 in) broad gauge line extends from Serhetabat in Turkmenistan to the town of Torghundi in Afghanistan, which is about 115 km (71 mi) to the north of Herat. An upgrade of this Soviet-built line, to renovate and connect the line from Torghundi to Herat, began in 2017.

A second rail connection between the two countries extends from Aqina dry port in Faryab Province of Afghanistan, via Imamnazar to Atamyrat (a.k.a. Kerki), where it connects with the Turkmen rail network. The line extends from Aqina south to Andkhoy in Afghanistan, which is approximately 58 km (36 mi) long. It will be extended from Andkhoy in the future to other parts of Afghanistan.

=== Afghanistan-Uzbekistan rail connections ===
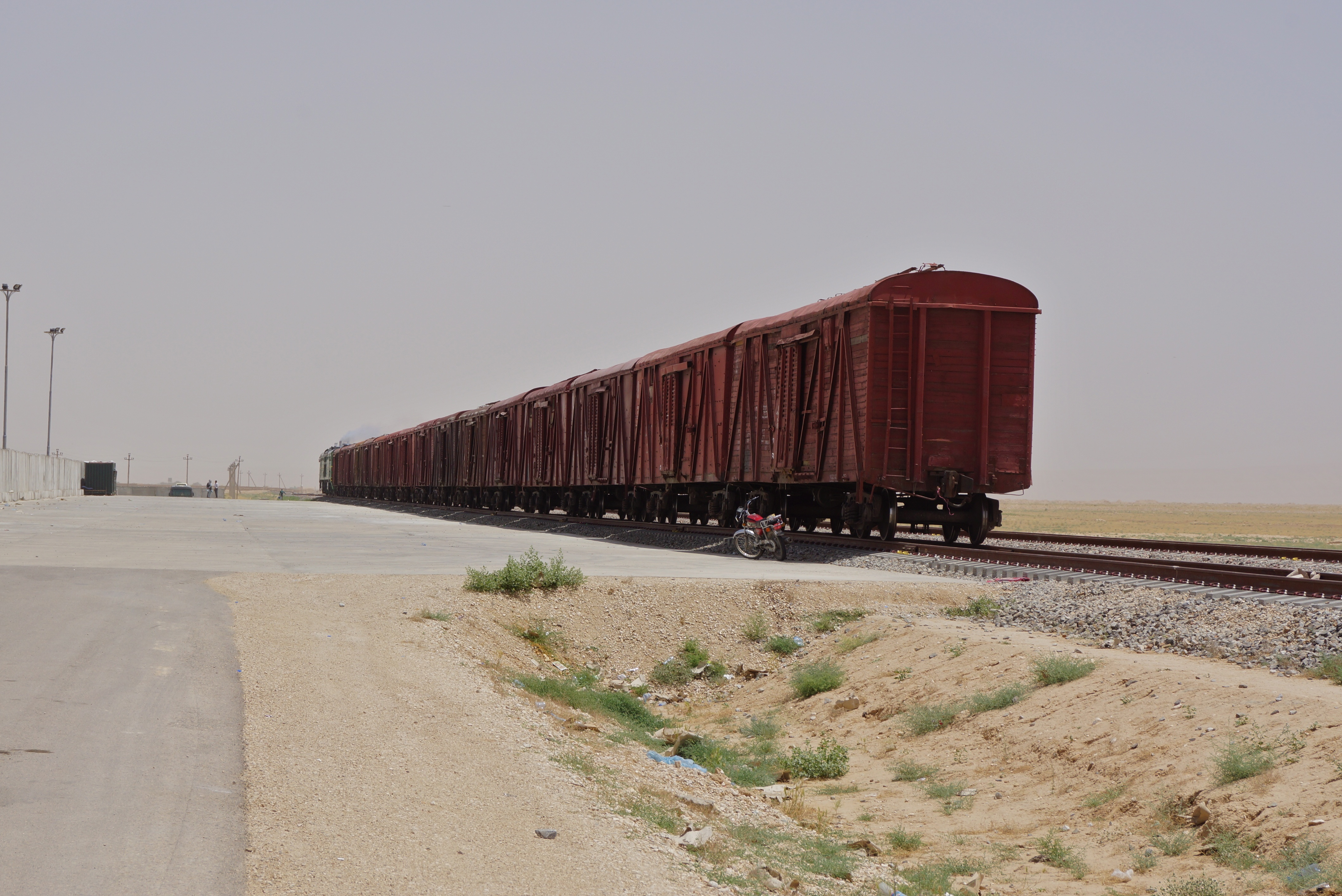
A freight train in Balkh Province

There is a 75-kilometer-long rail line between Uzbekistan and the northern Afghan city of Mazar-i-Sharif, all of which is built to 1,520 mm (4 ft 11 27/32 in) broad gauge. The line begins from Termez and crosses the Amu River on the Afghanistan–Uzbekistan Friendship Bridge, finally reaching a site next to the Mawlana Jalaluddin Mohammad Balkhi International Airport. Agreements have been signed for extending the line to Kabul and then to Peshawar.

=== Other borders ===
There are currently no rail links with neighboring China, Pakistan, and Tajikistan.

== Air ==
=== Civil aviation ===
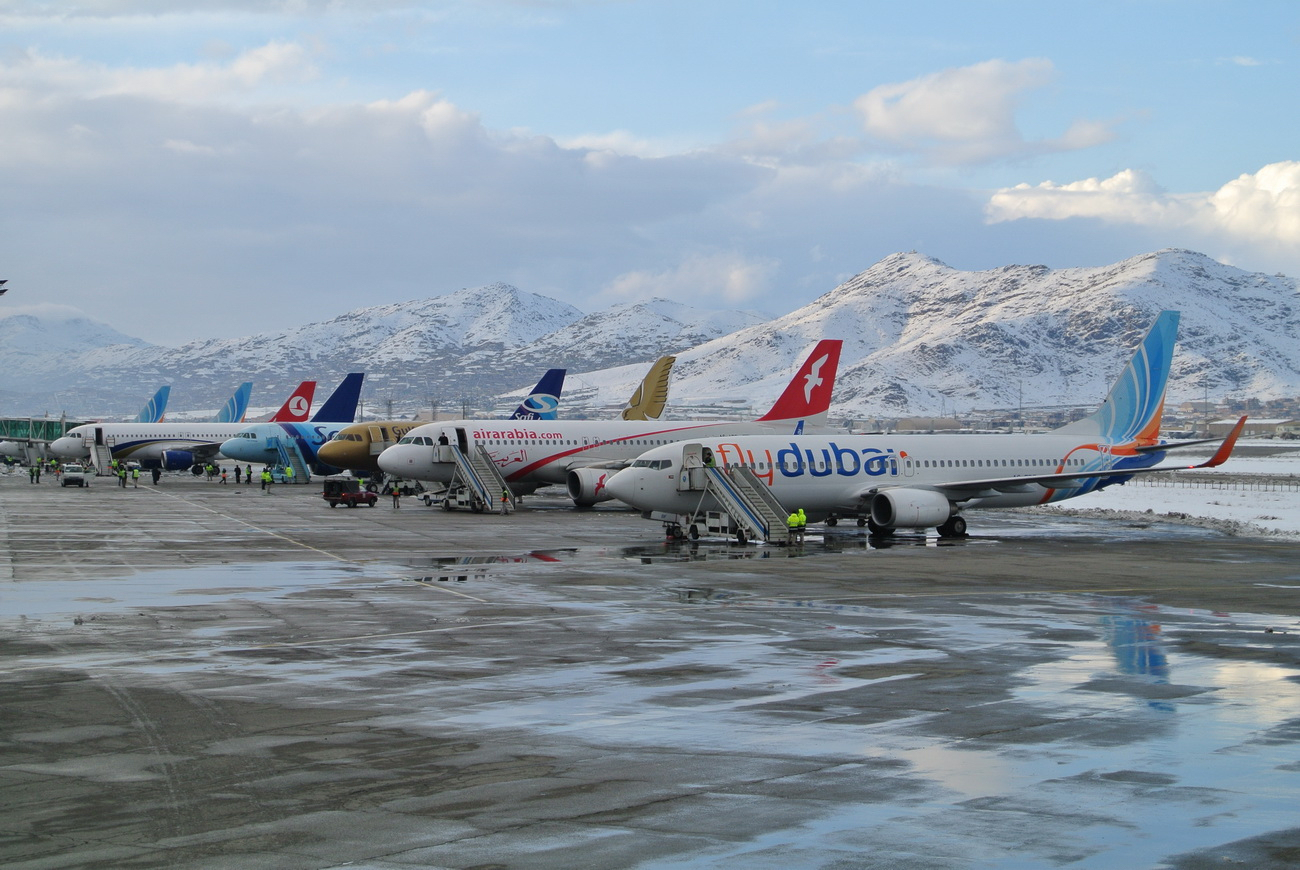
Airliners parked at Kabul International Airport in 2010

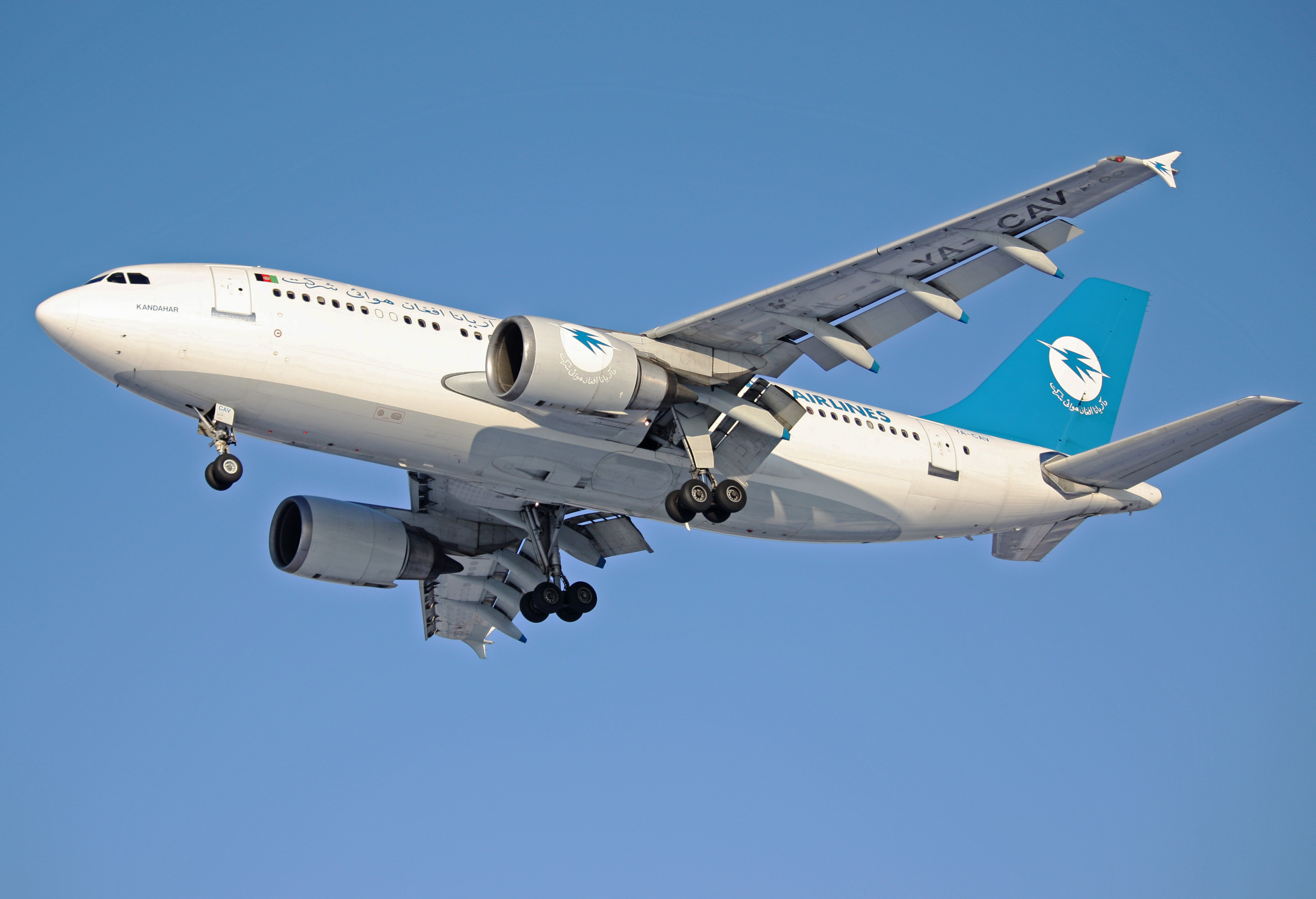
Ariana Afghan Airlines Airbus A310-300

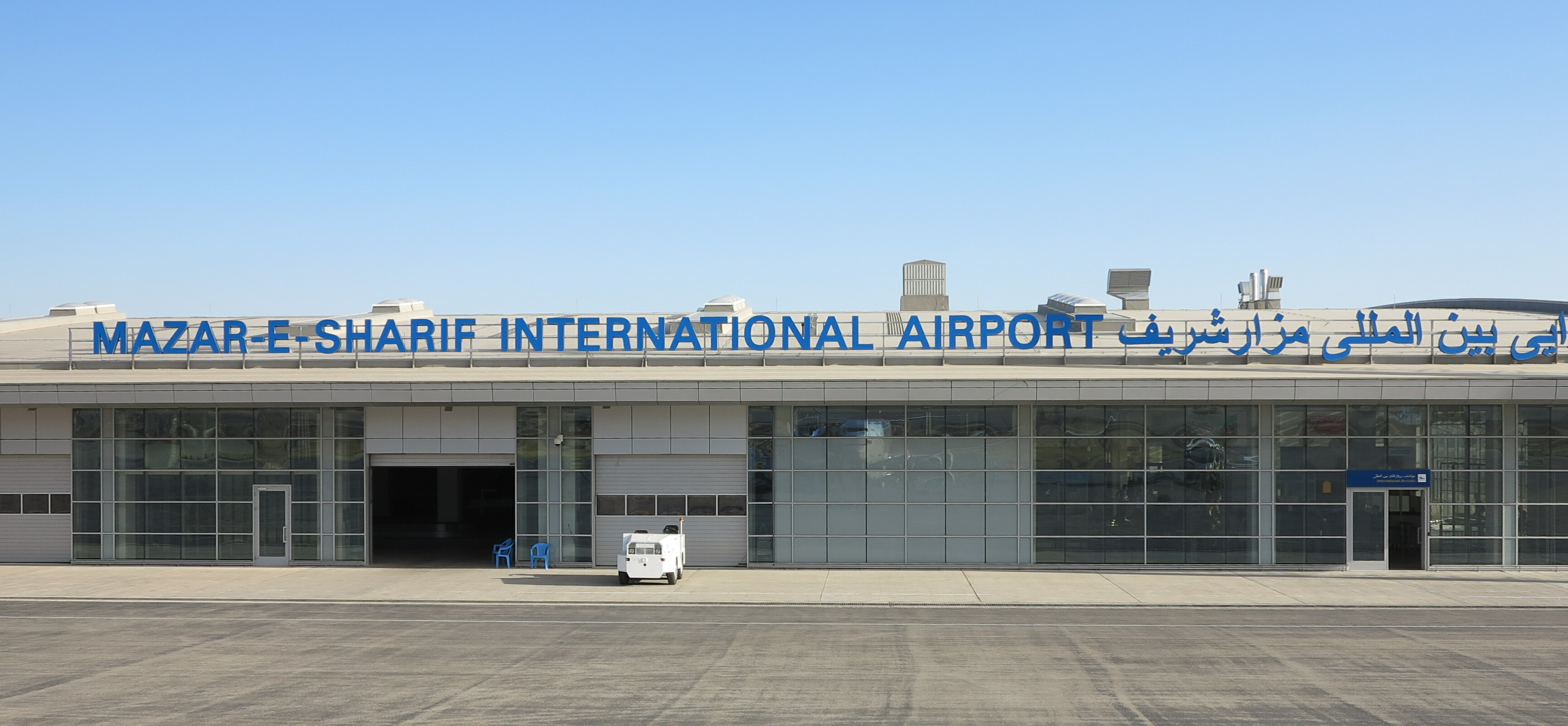
The Mawlana Jalaluddin Mohammad Balkhi International Airport in Mazar-i-Sharif

Air transport in Afghanistan is provided by the state-owned flag carrier Ariana Afghan Airlines (AAA), as well as the privately owned Kam Air. Domestic flights are available at a number of airports, with international flights taking place to and from Kabul International Airport. Ariana Afghan Airlines operates international flights from Kabul to Delhi, Dubai, Islamabad, Riyadh, and Urumqi, while Kam Air operates international flights to Almaty, Ankara, Delhi, Dushanbe, Islamabad, Istanbul, Jeddah, Kuwait, Sharjah, and Tashkent.

Following the 2021 fall of Kabul and the reestablishment of the Islamic Emirate, most international flights were suspended. Domestic flights officially resumed in January 2022. Prior to the change in government, airlines such as Air India, Emirates, Gulf Air, Iran Aseman Airlines, Pakistan International Airlines and Turkish Airlines operated international flights from airports throughout the country. A number of foreign airlines are currently operating in Afghanistan. They include Air Arabia, Etihad Airways, Flydubai, Iran Air, Iran Airtour, Kish Air, Mahan Air, Meraj Airlines, and Turkish Airlines.

Major airports in Afghanistan include the following:

International

- Kabul International Airport, the largest airport in Afghanistan and primary hub for international civilian flights located in Kabul
- Ahmad Shah Baba International Airport, serves as a civilian and military airport about 10 km to the southeast of Kandahar
- Mawlana Jalaluddin Mohammad Balkhi International Airport, serves as a civilian and military airport next to Mazar-i-Sharif.
- Khwaja Abdullah Ansari International Airport, a civilian airport located in the southern part of Herat.
- Khost International Airport, a new civilian airport located east of the city of Khost, which is the capital of Khost Province.

Domestic

- Bamyan Airport, also known as Shahid Mazari Airport, is located in the city of Bamyan, which is the capital of Bamyan Province.
- Bost Airport, also known as Lashkar Gah Airport, is located in Lashkar Gah, the capital of Helmand Province.
- Chaghcharan Airport is located in Chaghcharan, the capital of Ghor Province.
- Farah Airport is located east of the city of Farah, which is the capital of Farah Province.
- Fayzabad Airport is located northwest of Fayzabad, the capital of Badakhshan Province.
- Gardez Airport is located north of Gardez, the capital of Paktia Province.
- Ghazni Airport is located southeast of the city of Ghazni, which is the capital of Ghazni Province.
- Jalalabad Airport, also known as Nangarhar Airport, is located southeast of Jalalabad, the capital of Nangarhar Province.
- Kunduz Airport is located southeast of the city of Kunduz, the capital of Kunduz Province.
- Logar Airport is located southeast of Puli Alam, the capital of Logar Province.
- Maymana Airport is located northwest of Maymana, which is the capital of Faryab Province.
- Sharan Airport is located southeast of Sharana, the capital of Paktika Province.
- Tarinkot Airport is located south of Tarinkot, the capital of Uruzgan Province.
- Zaranj Airport, also known as Nimruz Airport, is located east of the city of Zaranj, which is the capital of Nimruz Province.

=== Military aviation ===
Military aviation in Afghanistan had its origins in the 1920s with assistance provided by the Soviet Union. Changing political influence in the country resulted in aircraft orders and military assistant changing between the world superpowers after the Second World War, principally between NATO and the Soviet Union. The current aerial warfare service of Afghanistan is the Afghan Air Force.

Bagram Air Base was originally constructed during the 1950s. It then saw significant expansion during Soviet and later NATO military operations in the region. Its facilities are capable of landing large aircraft such as Boeing 747, Lockheed C-5 Galaxy and Antonov An-124. As a legacy of Soviet and NATO military operations, a large number of military airfields and heliports can be found throughout the country. However, not all of these are in use, and in varying states of repair.

== Water ==
India-Iran-Afghanistan transport corridor map, which provides access to Chabahar Port in Iran

The chief inland waterway of land-locked Afghanistan is the Amu River, which forms part of Afghanistan's northern boundary. The river handles barge traffic up to about 500 metric tons. The main river ports are located at Hairatan in Balkh Province and Sher Khan Bandar in Kunduz Province.

== Pipelines ==
There are petroleum pipelines from Bagram into Uzbekistan and Shindand into Turkmenistan. These pipelines have been in disrepair and disuse for years. There are 180 km (110 mi) of natural gas pipelines. The Turkmenistan–Afghanistan–Pakistan–India Pipeline (TAPI) for delivering natural gas from Turkmenistan to India (via Afghanistan and Pakistan) is still under development. Only Turkmenistan has completed its section of the TAPI infrastructure as of 2025. The development of TAPI is projected to foster greater economic cooperation and mutual resource utilization between the 4 countries, giving Turkmenistan alternative routes of natural gas exports and reducing the dependence of South Asian countries on conventional exporters like Russia, Saudi Arabia, Iran and Brunei.

== See also ==
- Economy of Afghanistan
- Geography of Afghanistan
- Tourism in Afghanistan
