= Sher Malang =

Mullah Sher Mohammad Malang was a Taliban governor of Nimruz Province, Afghanistan under the Taliban government. He is a Popalzai. After the Taliban took control in the south in the mid-1990s, he was appointed governor of Nimruz and then later served with the military.

Malang is remembered by locals for burning a local library, beating people with a stick, and believing the local people to be Shi'a (and thus heretics per Taliban belief) due to their proximity to Iran.

Preceded by Mullah Ghani	Governor of Nimruz Province; 1995–?	Succeeded by Mullah Muhammad Rasul
