= Trakhun =

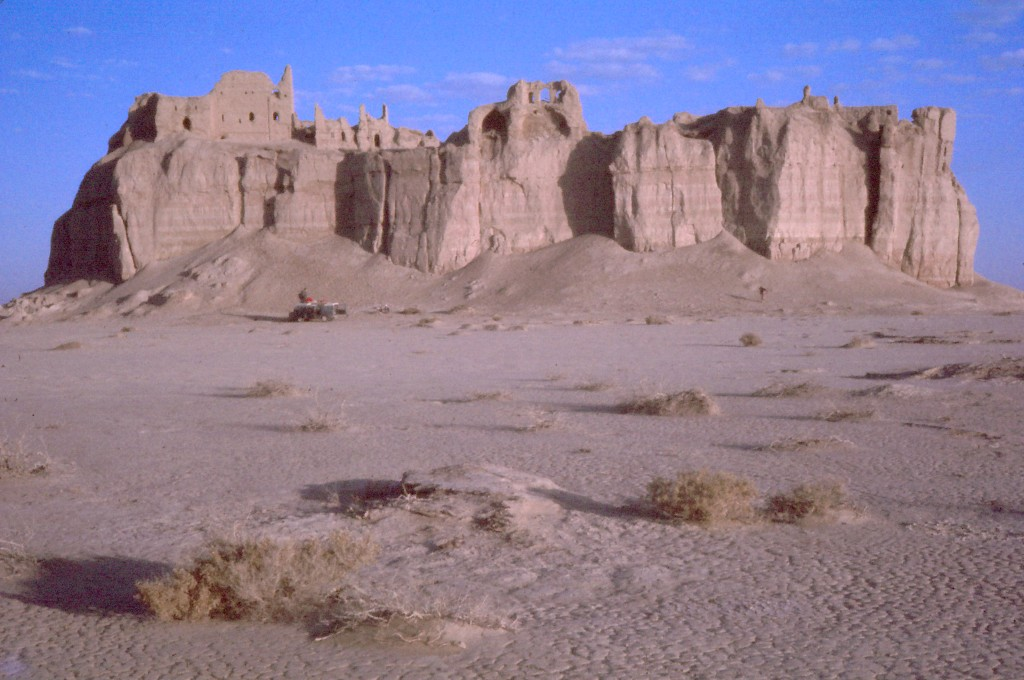
- Fortress of Trakhun in the center of the Rud-i Biyaban

- Location of the Trakhun
- 30°17′06″N 61°32′25″E
- Location: Nimroz Province, Afghanistan

The Trakhun (Pashto: تراخون, Balochi: قلعه ترقون) or Trakhu is a historical, archaeological site with high-walled fortress atop a 30 m high triangular rock formation over 100 m on each side, located in the center of the Rud-i Biyaban in Nimroz Province of the Sistan region. By legends and local tradition, Tarakhun is credited to be the birthplace of Rustam.
