= Zaranj District =

District in Afghanistan

Coordinates: 30.9600°N 61.8600°E

Zaranj District (Dari: ولسوالی زرنج, Balochi: زرنج دمگ) is a district of Nimruz Province, Afghanistan, containing the provincial capital city of Zaranj.

Route 606 connects Zaranj to Delaram which helps the Trade, and the toll-customs revenues have grown.

Zaranj has a hot desert climate (Köppen climate classification BWh) with very hot summers and cool winters. Precipitation is very low and mostly falls in winter. Temperatures in summer may approach 50 °C (122 °F). Snowfall in Zaranj is a rare event. On 27 November 2016, it snowed in this city.

== Demographics ==
In 2004, Zaranj had a population of 49,851 people in 242 villages. The population was given as Baloch 44%, Pashtun 34% and Tajik 22%.

== Agriculture ==
Per a 2007 report from the Ministry of Rural Rehabilitation and Development, the district grows maize, wheat, melon, watermelon, millet and lentil.
