= Delaram District =

Temporary District of Nimroz, Afghanistan

Delaram District is a temporary district of Nimruz Province in Afghanistan. It has a mixed population consisting of ethnic Pashtuns, Baloch, and Tajik. The capital of the district is the city of Delaram.

== See also ==
- Districts of Afghanistan
