= Ram Shahristan =

Ram Shahristan (or Abrashahriyar) was the ancient capital of Sistan, in what is now southwestern Afghanistan and southeastern Iran.

Per Arab geographers, prior to Zaranj the capital of Sistan was Ram Shahristan. Ram Shahristan had been supplied with water by a canal from the Helmand River, but its dam broke, the area was deprived of water, and the populace moved three days' march to found Zaranj.

The ruins of Ram Shahristan were, by the 10th century AD, already swallowed up by the deserts, with only a few remnants of buildings visible.
