= Route 606 (Afghanistan) =

Road in Afghanistan

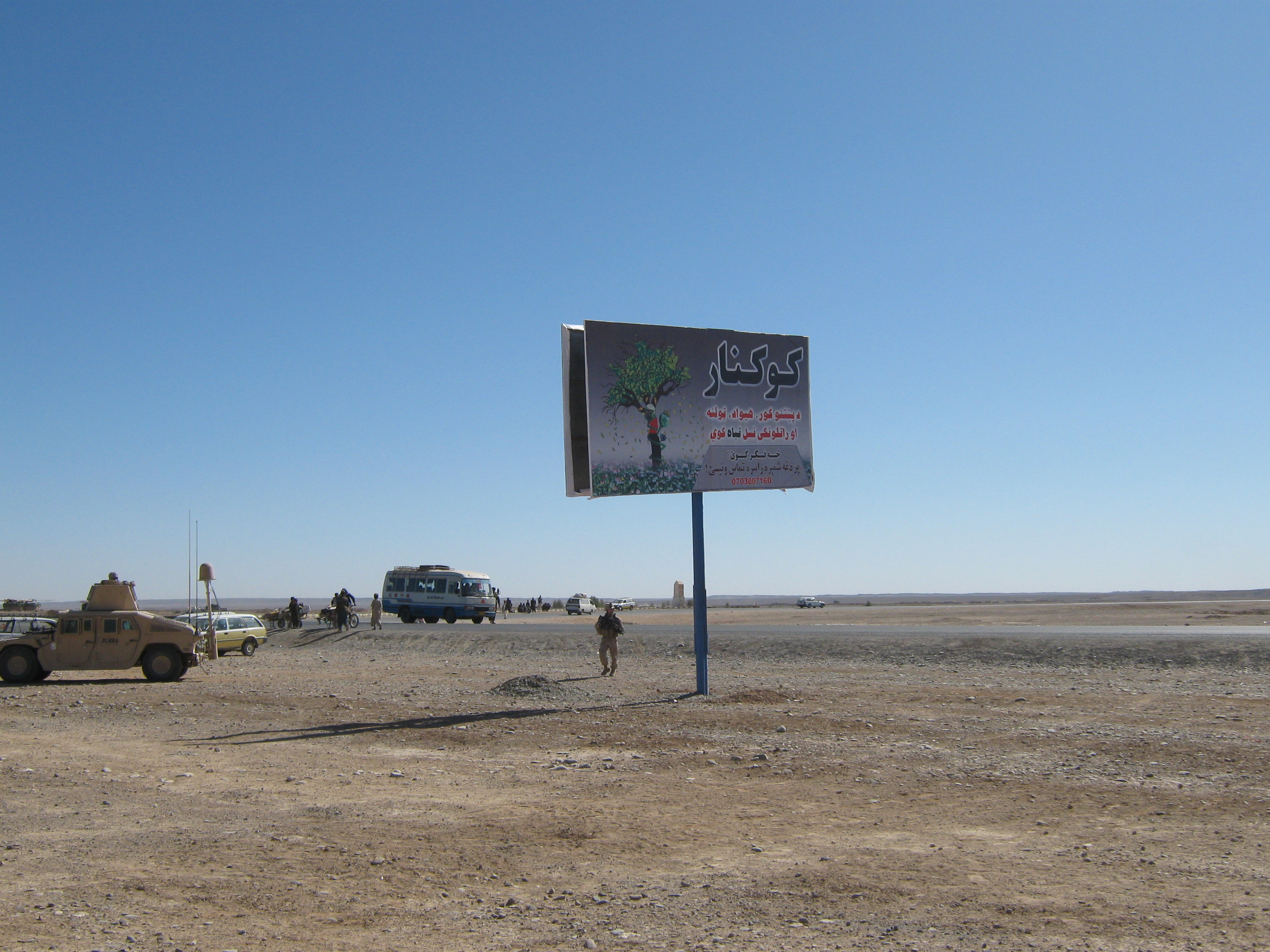

Route information
- Part of AH71
- Length: 218 km (135 mi)
- Existed: 2009–present

Major junctions
- Southwest end: Iran (near Zaranj)
- Northeast end: Delaram

Location
- Country: Afghanistan

Highway system
- Transport in Afghanistan

Route 606, also known as Delaram-Zaranj Highway, also officially designated as NH49, is a 218 km roadway in the Nimruz Province of Afghanistan connecting the Delaram District in Afghanistan to the border of Iran. The opposite way goes towards the south near Zaranj, Afghanistan. It is one of the busiest roads in Afghanistan and provides an important trade route between Iran and the rest of Asia. It was developed by India's Border Roads Organisation.

It connects the Afghan–Iranian border with the Kandahar–Herat Highway in Delaram, which provides connectivity to other major Afghan cities via A01. Route 606 reduces travel time between Delaram and Zaranj from the earlier 12–14 hours to just 2 hours.

From Zaranj, the highway connects to Zabol across the border in Iran. Zabol is well-connected by road to the Port of Chabahar. The highway thus provides land-locked Afghanistan an alternative way to access the Arabian Sea and the Persian Gulf, instead of relying solely on Pakistani routes. "The road is much shorter and more stable than any of the routes in Pakistan, making it perhaps the most efficient means of reaching Afghanistan."

== Route ==
The northern terminus of Route 606 connects to the Ring Road in Delaram at the west end of the Delaram Bazaar. The southern terminus is on the border of Iran near the city of Zaranj, the capital of Nimruz Province. The road passes through the districts of Delaram, Chankhansur, Khash Rod and Zaranj. It intersects with Route 515 near Delaram.

=== Key points ===
- Northern terminus (Delaram at Highway 1): 32°10′11.17″N 63°23′01.61″E
- Intersection with Route 515: 32°09′45.55″N 63°22′41.78″E
- Zaranj District Center: 30°57′36.81″N 61°51′36.05″E
- Southern terminus (border of Iran): 30°57′01.51″N 61°48′37.78″E

== History ==
India helped build the road known as Route 606 in 2009 for Afghanistan to bypass Pakistan during commercial trade, at a cost of US$152 million. These improvements consisted of paving the road, but frequent fighting in the area due to the war in Afghanistan hindered construction.

The highway was designed and constructed by the Border Roads Organisation (BRO) of India. The highway was opened to the public on 22 January 2009 by Afghan President Hamid Karzai.

Over 300 BRO engineers and technicians were deployed on the project, accompanied by 70 Indo-Tibetan Border Police (ITBP) personnel for their security.

Construction of the highway started in 2005, but progress was slow since it was a target of frequent insurgent attacks. 135 people working on the road were killed in such attacks, including 129 Afghans and 6 Indians. Two BRO employees and 4 ITBP personnel were among those killed.
