= Zaranj Airport =

Zaranj Airport Pashto: زرنج هوایي ډگر
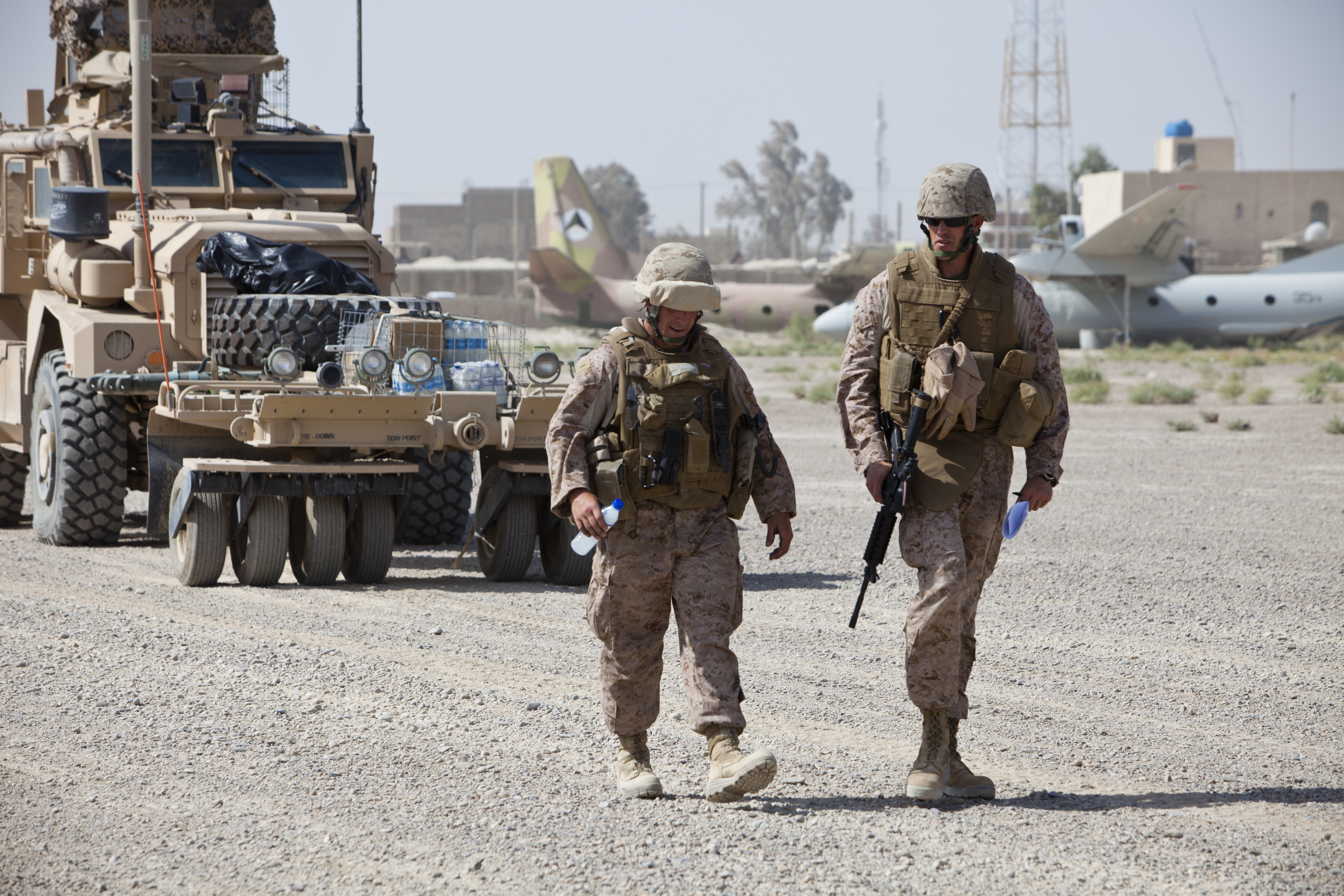
- U.S. Marine Corps performing a safety inspection of the runway in 2012
- IATA: ZAJ; ICAO: OAZJ

Summary
- Airport type: Public
- Owner: Afghanistan
- Location: Zaranj, Afghanistan
- Built: 1969
- Elevation AMSL: 1,592 ft / 485 m
- Coordinates: 30°58′20″N 061°51′57″E

Map
- Location of airport in Afghanistan

Runways
Direction	Length		Surface
Direction	m	ft	Surface
16/34	2,000	6,562	Gravel
- Sources: AIP Afghanistan

Zaranj Airport (Pashto: زرنج هوایي ډگر; Dari: فرودگاه زرنج; IATA: ZAJ, ICAO: OAZJ) was an airport located in the city of Zaranj, Nimruz Province, Afghanistan. It was replaced by the newly constructed Nimruz Airport, located 17 kilometres (11 mi) east of the city. As of 2020, Zaranj Airport is no longer listed in the Afghan Aeronautical Information Publication (AIP).

Sitting at an elevation of 1,592 feet (485 m) above sea level, Zaranj Airport has one gravel runway measuring around 2,000 by 60 metres (6,562 ft × 197 ft).

Plans to replace the airport emerged in 2011, with the new Nimruz Airport being located 17 kilometres (11 mi) east of the city. Flight safety was one of the reasons cited that led to the construction of the new airport in view of the small runway and nearby residential houses. Construction began on 1 November 2011.

Two runway excursions in 1995 and 2008 resulted in damage to nearby houses.

== Former airlines and destinations ==
Previously, the airport was served by other airlines including Kam Air and East Horizon Airlines which operated flights to Kabul and Herat.

The airport was now closed, and there are no scheduled services operated at the airport.

== See also ==
- List of airports in Afghanistan
