= Gulistan District =

Gulistan گلستان
- District
- Location within Afghanistan
- Coordinates: 32°30′24″N 63°46′09″E
- Country: Afghanistan
- Province: Farah

Area
  - Total: 7,102 km^{2} (2,742 sq mi)

Population (2004)
  - Total: 53,780

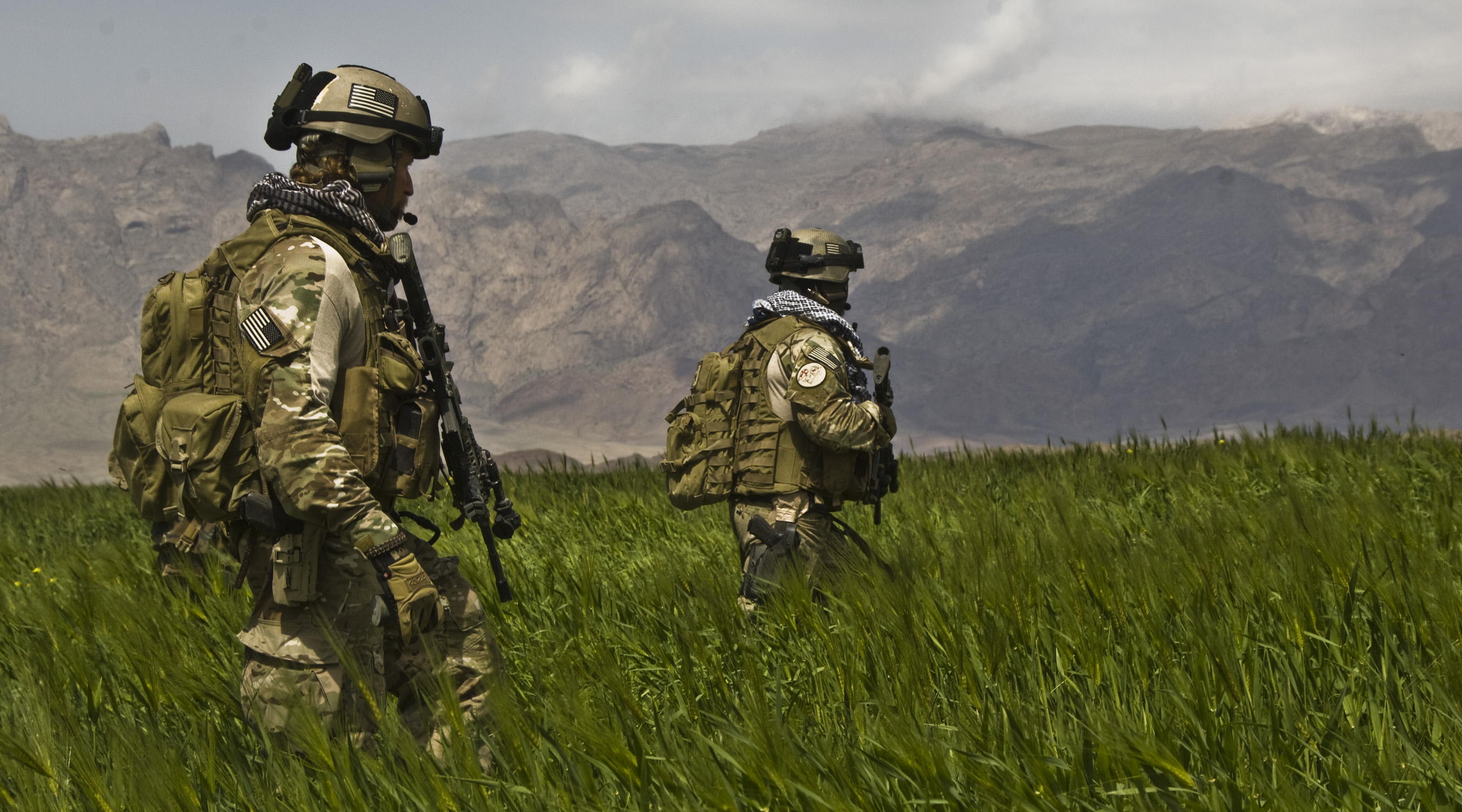
US 3rd Special Forces Group patrol a field in the Gulistan district

Gulistan, also spelled as Golestan (Pashto گلستان), is a district in Farah Province, Afghanistan. Its population, which is predominantly Pashtun, was estimated at 53,780 in October 2004. The district has a total of 109 villages. The main village, also called Gulistan, is situated at 1434 m altitude in the mountainous part of the district. The main road through the district is Route 522.

== War in Afghanistan ==
In September 2005, Taliban fighters briefly gained control of the district from Afghan security forces after heavy fighting.

In May 2019, Taliban forces attacked a checkpoint in the district, killing 20 Afghan fighters and abducting 2.
