= Hamidullah Niyazmand =

Taliban leader

Hamidullah Niyazmand was appointed governor of Nimroz, Afghanistan, following the Taliban's capture of the province in early 1995. Though Hamidullah had been raised in Pakistan, his father had been a mullah in the province, and his family had some standing there. Though Hamidullah was relatively familiar with and respectful of local customs, he diverged from this on the issue of language, making Urdu the official language of the province, allowing Pashto, but not recognizing other languages.
