= Zaranj =

Provincial capital city of Nimruz, Afghanistan

Zaranj زرنج
- Provincial capital
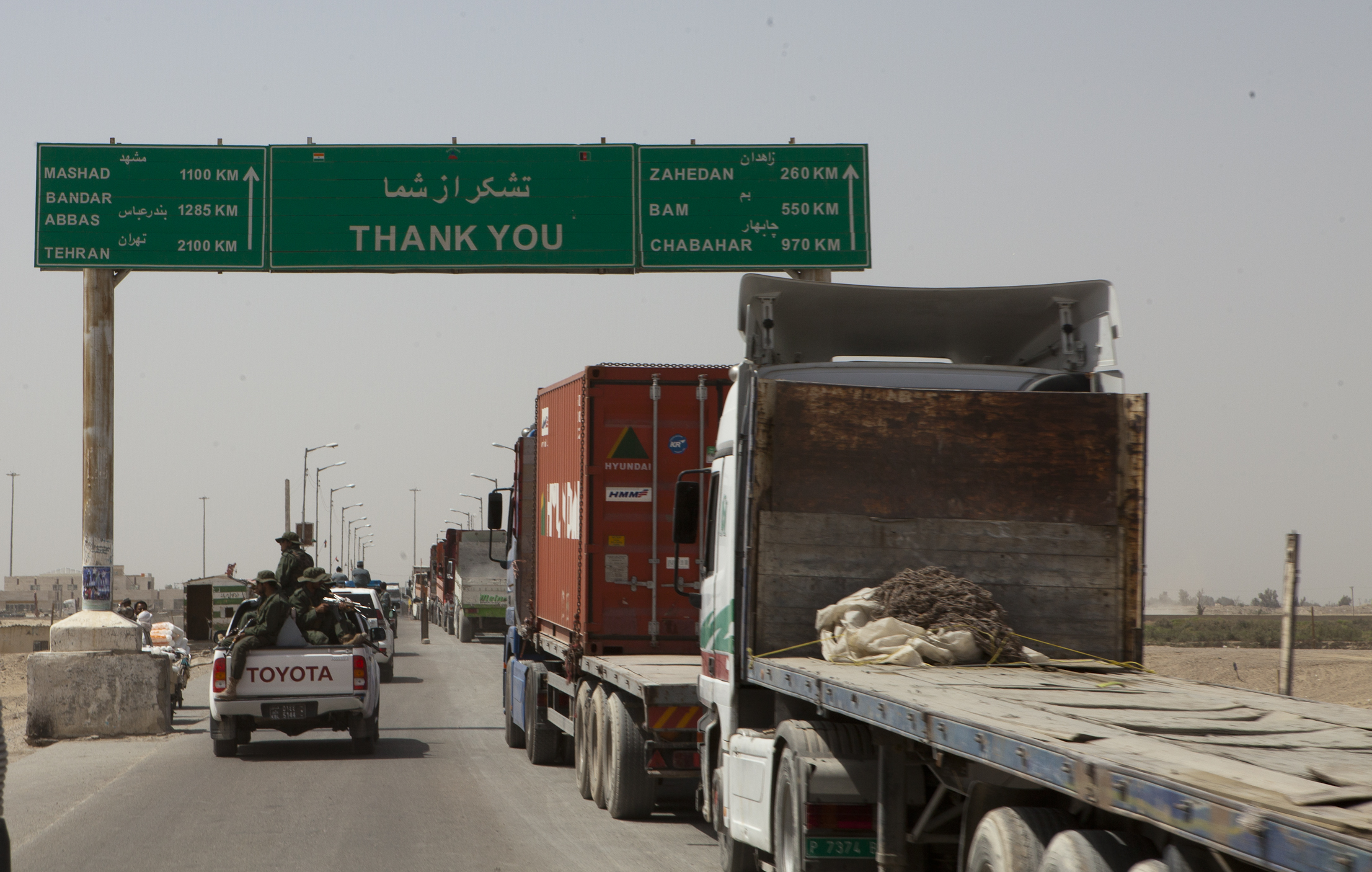
- The Afghanistan side of Pul-i-Abresham border crossing in 2011
- Interactive map of Zaranj
- Location in Afghanistan
- Coordinates: 30°57′36″N 61°51′36″E
- Country: Afghanistan
- Province: Nimruz
- District: Zaranj

Government
  - Type: Municipality
  - Mayor: Maulvi Salahuddin Mumtaz

Area
  - Land: 48 km^{2} (19 sq mi)
- Elevation: 476 m (1,562 ft)

Population (2025)
  - Provincial capital: 72,272
  - Density: 1,500/km^{2} (3,900/sq mi)
  - Urban: 34,190
  - Rural: 38,082
- Time zone: UTC+04:30 (Afghanistan Time)
- ISO 3166 code: AF-ZAJ

Zaranj (Balochi, (Note: Balochi pronunciation: [zəˈɾaŋʒ]) Pashto (Note: Pashto pronunciation: [za.rand͡ʒ]); Dari (Note: Dari pronunciation: [zä.ɾǽnd͡ʒ]): زرنج) is a city in southwestern Afghanistan, serving as the capital of Nimruz Province. It is within the jurisdiction of Zaranj District and has an estimated population of 72,272 people. Maulvi Salahuddin Mumtaz is the current mayor of the city. His predecessor was Maulvi Nooruddin Hamza.

Zaranj is home to Nimruz University, which is located in the eastern part of the city. The new Zaranj Airport is about 20 km (12 mi) further to the east, next to the Delaram-Zaranj Highway. The city has a number of factories, bazaars, business centers, public parks, banks, hotels, restaurants, mosques, hospitals, universities, and places to play sports or just relax.

Zaranj is at an elevation of approximately 476 m (1,562 ft) above sea level and has a land area of 48 km^{2} (19 sq mi). The city is connected by highways with Ghurghuri and Lashkargah to the east, Farah to the north, and the Afghanistan–Iran border to the west. The Pul-i-Abresham border crossing is located in the western part of Zaranj. It is one of three important trade-routes that connect Central Asia, East Asia and South Asia with the Middle East. It is also used by the Afghans in Iran to enter Afghanistan.

== History ==
The history of Zaranj dates back over 2,500 years. It bears the name of an ancient city whose name is also attested in Old Persian as Zranka and Middle Persian as Zrang. In Greek, this word became Drangiana. Other historical names for Zaranj include Zirra, Zarangia, Zarani etc. Ultimately, the word Zaranj is derived from the ancient Old Persian word zaranka ("waterland").

Achaemenid Zranka, the capital of Drangiana, was almost certainly located at Dahan-e Gholaman, southeast of Zabol in Iran. After the abandonment of that city, its name, Zarang or Zaranj in later Perso-Arabic orthography, was transferred to the subsequent administrative centers of the region, which itself came to be known as Sakastān, then Sijistan and finally Sistān. Medieval Zaranj is located at Nād-i `Alī, 4.4 km north of the modern city of Zaranj. According to the Arab geographers, prior to medieval Zaranj, the capital of Sistan was located at Ram Shahristan (Abar shariyar). Ram Shahristan had been supplied with water by a canal from the Helmand River, but its dam broke, the area was deprived of water, and the populace moved three days' march to found Zaranj. This Zaranj appears on the Peutinger Map of late Antiquity.

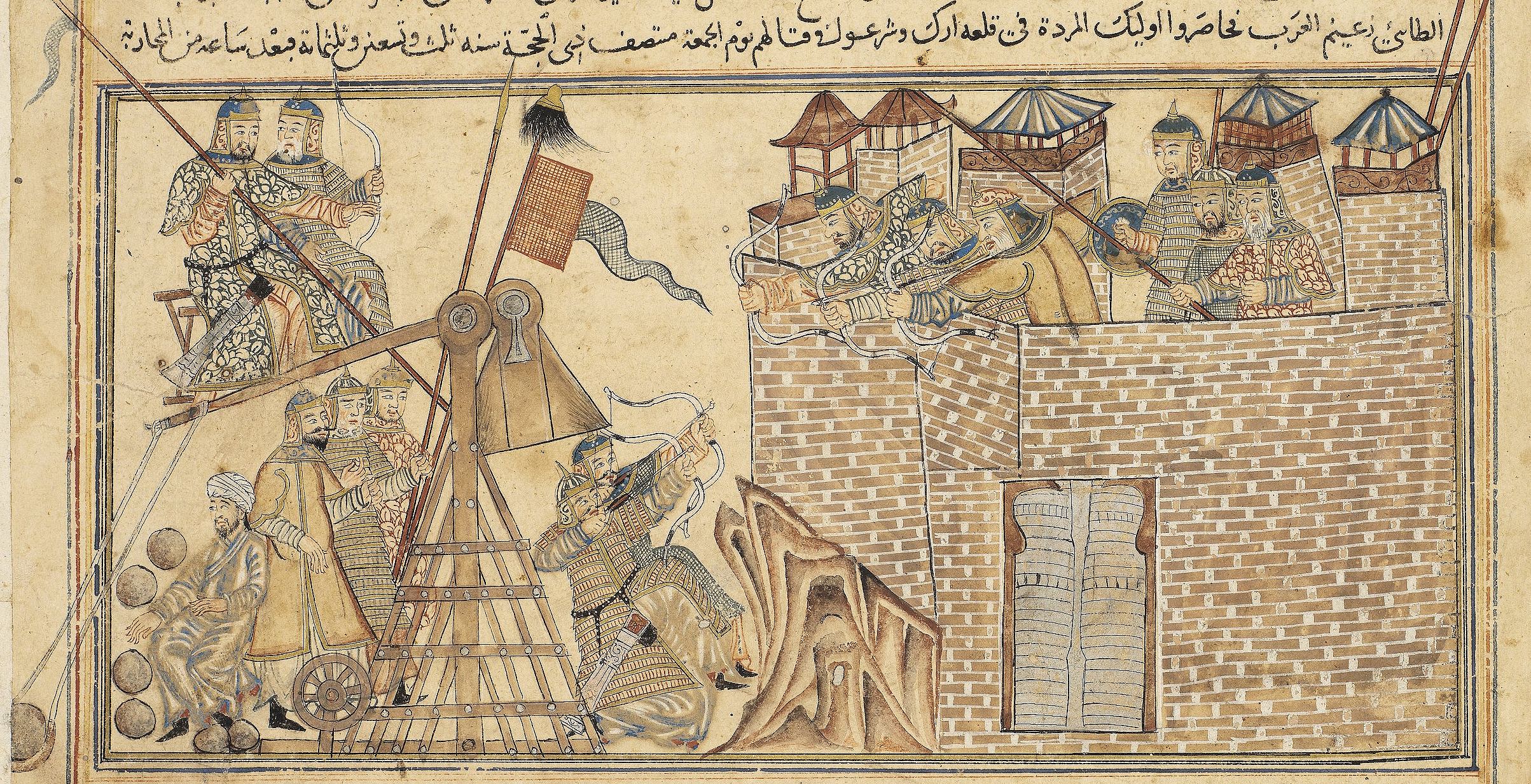
Mahmud of Ghazni attacking the fortress of Zarang in 1003 CE. Jami al-Tawarikh, 1314

The area came under Muslim rule in 652, when Zaranj surrendered to the governor of Khurāsān; it subsequently became a base for further caliphal expansion in the region. In 661, a small Arab garrison reestablished its authority in the region after having temporarily lost control due to skirmishes and revolts. A Nestorian Christian community is recorded in Zaranj in the sixth century, and by the end of the eighth century there was a Jacobite diocese of Zaranj. In the 9th century Zaranj was the capital of the Saffarid dynasty, whose founder was the local coppersmith turned warlord, Ya'qub ibn al-Layth al-Saffar. It became part of the Ghaznavids, Ghorids, Trimurids, Safavids and others. Defeated by the Samanids in 900, the Saffarids sank to a position of regional importance, until conquered by Mahmud of Ghazni in 1003. Subsequently, Zaranj served as the capital of the Nasrid (1029–1225) and Mihrabānid (1236–1537) maliks of Nīmrūz.

In the early 18th century, the city was captured by the Kandahari Hotak dynasty who were removed from power in 1738 by Nader Shah of Khorasan. Zaranj came under Khanate of Kalat in the mid-18th century. Under the modern Afghan governments, the area was known as Farah-Chakansur Province until 1968, when it was separated to form the provinces of Nimruz and Farah. The city of Zaranj became the capital of Nimroz province.

=== Early 21st century ===
The city began to develop in the 21st century, after the U.S. invasion of Afghanistan and the establishment of the Afghan Interim Administration in late 2001. A new highway called Route 606 was built between Zaranj and Delaram in Farah province by the Indian Government's Border Roads Organization at a cost of about US$136 million to open up a link between the deep sea port at Chabahar in Iran to Afghanistan's main ring road highway system which connects Kabul, Kandahar, Herat, Mazar-i-Sharif and Kunduz. The 215 km-long (134 mi) highway, a symbol of India's developmental work, was handed over to Afghan authorities by then-Indian External Affairs Minister Pranab Mukherjee in January 2009 in the presence of then-Afghan President Hamid Karzai and Foreign Minister Rangeen Dadfar Spanta.

The province has been one of the 7 (Nimruz, Helmand, Kandahar, Uruzgan, Ghazni, Paktika and Zabul) where the Taliban have regrouped. On 14 August 2012 dozens of civilians were killed in Zaranj by several suicide-bombers in a major terrorist attack on the city.

Due to Zaranj's close proximity to Iran, the city has been using mostly on Iranian products. With the increase of trade the Afghan Border Police has been dealing with a rise in smuggling, particularly illegal drugs and weapons. The overall economic situation became better for the local population of the city. Hundreds of trucks containing merchandise from the Middle East enter the city on a daily basis.

In the last decade, the U.S. Marines and others of the International Security Assistance Force (ISAF) have been visiting Zaranj. The United States was involved in economic development projects. This included improvement made to the irrigation network of the city, building of Afghan military and Afghan National Police barracks as well as a hospital and a school. The US Marines assigned to 3rd Marine Aircraft Wing have been visiting Zaranj since the Forward Operating Base Delaram was built in Delaram. The 3rd Marine Aircraft Wing built two concrete helicopter landing zones on western side of the gravel runway of Zaranj Airport to ease the landing of USMC V-22 Osprey helicopters from 3rd Battalion 4th Marines.

==== Fall of Islamic Republic ====
On 6 August 2021, Zaranj became the first provincial capital to be captured by the Taliban during their offensive. Afghan officials said the Taliban faced "little resistance" in capturing the city with the 215th Corps of the Afghan National Army focusing instead on the Battle of Lashkargah. Shortly after entering the city, the Taliban broke into the city's prison, releasing a large number of prisoners into Zaranj.

On March 8, 2022, The New York Times reported a boom in the business of smugglers helping - for payment - the escape of hundreds of thousands of Afghans seeking to cross into Iran, to escape the Taliban rule and/or the harsh economic conditions. According to the report, "nearly everyone in Zaranj is involved, in one way or another, in the smuggling business". Meanwhile, millions are now returning to Afghanistan.

== Geography ==
Zaranj is located in the western part of Nimruz Province in southwestern Afghanistan, near the Afghanistan–Iran border. The city is at an important trade route that connects Central Asia, East Asia and South Asia with the Middle East. Zaranj is at an elevation of approximately 476 m (1,562 ft) above sea level and has a land area of 48 km^{2} (19 sq mi) or 4,823 ha (11,920 acres). Its main source of water is from both the Khash River and the Helmand River.

The Delaram-Zaranj Highway is a two-lane road connecting Zaranj with Delaram in neighboring Farah Province. It was built with funding from India and connects with the Kandahar–Herat Highway in Delaram, which provides connectivity to other major Afghan cities via A01. Route 606 reduces travel time between Zaranj and Delaram from the earlier 12–14 hours to just 2 hours.

=== Climate ===
Zaranj has a hot desert climate (Köppen climate classification BWh) with very hot summers and cool winters. Precipitation is very low and mostly falls in winter. Temperatures in summer may approach 50 °C (122 °F). Snowfall happens in Zaranj is a extremely rare event.

Climate data for Zaranj
Month	Jan	Feb	Mar	Apr	May	Jun	Jul	Aug	Sep	Oct	Nov	Dec	Year
Record high °C (°F)	24.1 (75.4)	30.6 (87.1)	37.0 (98.6)	45.0 (113.0)	51.0 (123.8)	49.7 (121.5)	49.3 (120.7)	50.0 (122.0)	49.7 (121.5)	42.0 (107.6)	36.0 (96.8)	27.8 (82.0)	51.0 (123.8)
Mean daily maximum °C (°F)	14.3 (57.7)	18.7 (65.7)	25.0 (77.0)	32.6 (90.7)	37.3 (99.1)	42.8 (109.0)	42.5 (108.5)	41.3 (106.3)	37.0 (98.6)	31.2 (88.2)	23.1 (73.6)	17.7 (63.9)	30.3 (86.5)
Daily mean °C (°F)	6.5 (43.7)	10.0 (50.0)	15.7 (60.3)	23.3 (73.9)	29.1 (84.4)	33.4 (92.1)	35.0 (95.0)	32.3 (90.1)	27.2 (81.0)	21.9 (71.4)	13.1 (55.6)	8.7 (47.7)	21.3 (70.4)
Mean daily minimum °C (°F)	0.1 (32.2)	2.9 (37.2)	7.7 (45.9)	14.7 (58.5)	20.0 (68.0)	25.2 (77.4)	27.3 (81.1)	24.9 (76.8)	18.5 (65.3)	12.3 (54.1)	4.8 (40.6)	0.7 (33.3)	13.3 (55.9)
Record low °C (°F)	−13.2 (8.2)	−8.2 (17.2)	−5.2 (22.6)	1.0 (33.8)	5.0 (41.0)	16.0 (60.8)	18.4 (65.1)	13.2 (55.8)	3.9 (39.0)	−2.7 (27.1)	−7.1 (19.2)	−8.8 (16.2)	−13.2 (8.2)
Average precipitation mm (inches)	19.7 (0.78)	9.9 (0.39)	11.2 (0.44)	2.4 (0.09)	0.6 (0.02)	0.0 (0.0)	0.0 (0.0)	0.0 (0.0)	0.0 (0.0)	1.2 (0.05)	1.4 (0.06)	5.1 (0.20)	51.5 (2.03)
Average rainy days	3	2	2	2	0	0	0	0	0	0	1	1	11
Average relative humidity (%)	55	50	44	40	35	29	28	29	33	41	49	54	41
Source: NOAA (1969-1983)

== Demographics ==
According to Afghanistan's National Statistics and Information Authority, Zaranj has an estimated population of 72,272 residents. It was around 49,851 in 2004. The ethnic groups have been estimated and reported in 2007 as follows: Baloch 44%, Pashtun 34% and Tajik 22%. In 2015 there were 17,878 dwelling units in the city.

== Law and government ==
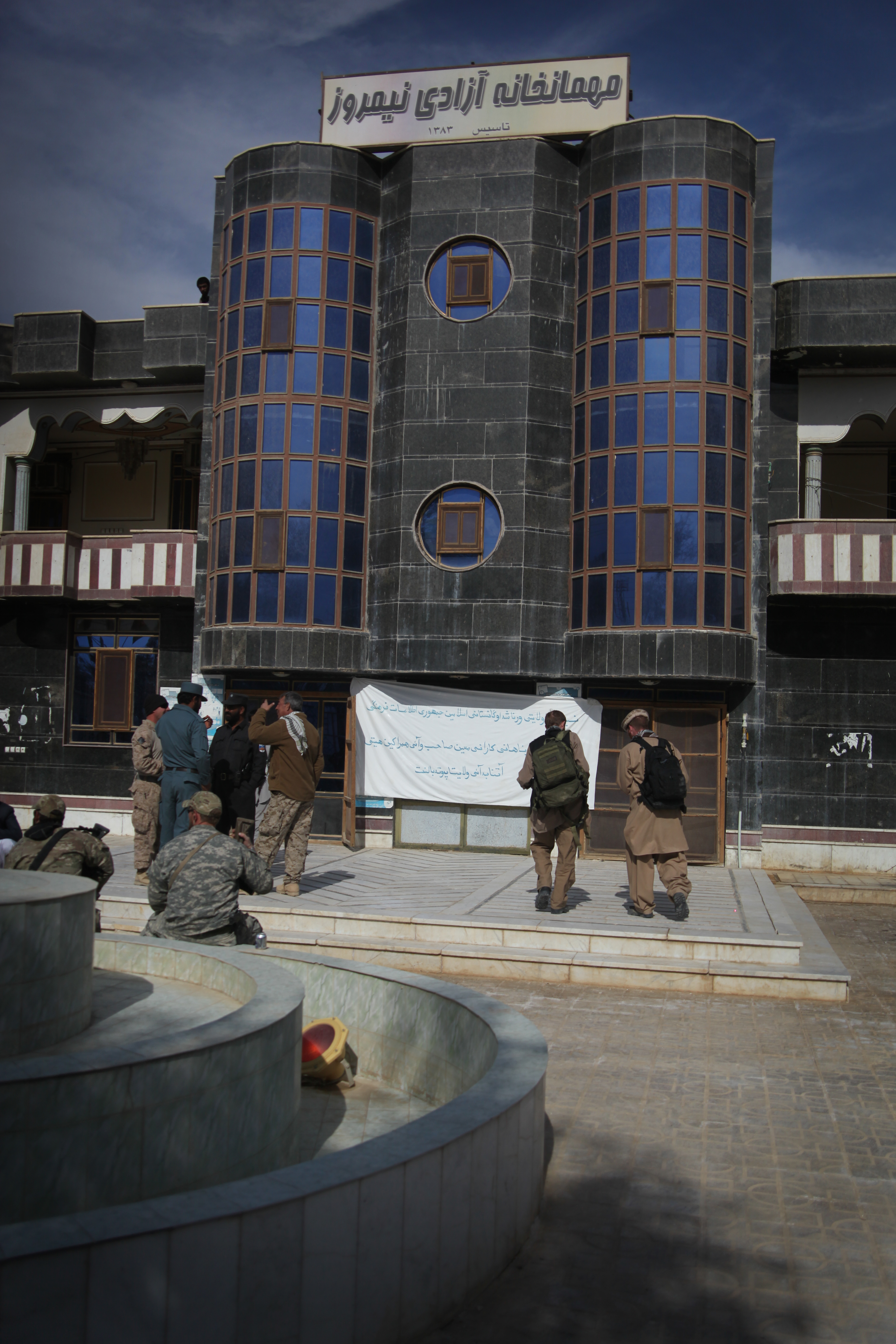
Governor's Complex

The city of Zaranj is within the jurisdiction of Zaranj District and administratively divided into several nahias (city districts). Every nahia has a police station and a number of neighborhoods. Maulvi Salahuddin Mumtaz serves as the current mayor of the city. His predecessor was Maulvi Nooruddin Hamza.

The Zaranj Municipality's structure consists of several departments under the mayor. Like other provincial municipalities in Afghanistan, the Zaranj Municipality deals with city affairs such as infrastructure developments. The city districts collect certain taxes and issue building licenses. Each city district has a district head appointed by the mayor.

The Governor's Complex is also located in Zaranj, which is in charge of governing all the districts of Nimruz Province.

== Education ==
Zaranj has a number of public and private schools. There are also a number of universities. The largest is Nimruz University.

== Healthcare ==
There are a limited number of hospitals and clinics in Zaranj. Those seeking advanced medical care travel to faraway cities such as Kandahar, Herat or Kabul. Some apply for medical visa to visit hospitals in foreign countries.

== Sports ==
Cricket, football, futsal and volleyball are the most popular sports in Afghanistan.

== Notable people ==
- Ya'qub ibn al-Layth al-Saffar founder of the Saffarid dynasty of Sistan, born in Karnin near Zaranj
- Amr ibn al-Layth second ruler of the Saffarid dynasty, born in Karnin near Zaranj
- Al-Layth ibn Ali ibn al-Layth, amir of the Saffarid amirate in Zaranj from 909 until 910
- Al-Mu'addal ibn al-Layth, Saffarid ruler of Zaranj for a part of 911

== See also ==
- List of cities in Afghanistan
- Islam Qala

== Bibliography ==
- Bosworth, C. E., "SISTĀN ii. Sistān ii. In the Islamic period," in Encyclopaedia Iranica (2011).
- Gnoli, G., "Dahan-e Ḡolāmān," in Encyclopaedia Iranica, vol. 6 (1993), 582–585.
- Le Strange, Guy (1905). The Lands of the Eastern Caliphate: Mesopotamia, Persia, and Central Asia, from the Moslem Conquest to the Time of Timur. Cambridge: Cambridge University Press.
- Schmitt, R., "Drangiana," in Encyclopaedia Iranica, vol. 7 (1995) 534–537.
