= Afghanistan Ring Road =

Road in Afghanistan

National Highway 1
- Dari: شاهراه حلقوی افغانستان; Pashto: د افغانستان حلقوي سړک

Route information
- Part of AH1

Location
- Country: Afghanistan

Highway system
- Transport in Afghanistan

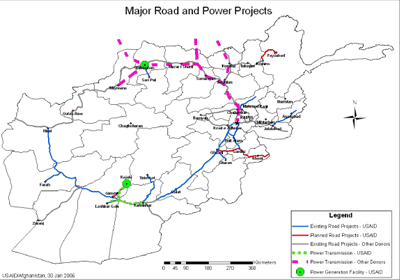
Map of Afghanistan's Ring Road and major projects supported by the USA as of March 2006

National Highway 01 or NH01, formally called the Ring Road (Pashto: د افغانستان حلقوي سړک; Dari: شاهراه حلقوی افغانستان), is a 2,200 km (1,400 mi) two-lane and in some areas a four-lane road network circulating inside Afghanistan, connecting the following cities (clockwise): Kabul, Wardak, Ghazni, Qalat, Kandahar, Delaram, Herat, Qala e Naw, Maymana, Andkhoy, Sheberghan, Mazar-i-Sharif, Puli Khumri, Charikar, and back to Kabul. It has extensions that connect Jalalabad, Bamyan, Khost, Spin Boldak, Lashkargah, Zaranj (Route 606), Farah, Islam Qala, Torghundi, Ymamnazar, Hairatan, Kunduz, and Fayzabad. The Ring Road is part of AH1, the longest route of the Asian Highway Network. National Highway 01 consists of four major sections, NH0101 to NH0104, linking the major economic centers.

== History ==
Part of National Highway 1 has been refurbished in late 2003, particularly the Kabul–Kandahar Highway. The repair project was funded by the United States, Saudi Arabia and Japan. In addition to Afghans, several foreign workers from Turkey and India were involved in the project. Japanese also assisted with the project near the southern Afghan province of Kandahar. About two decades later, the Kabul–Kandahar Highway was completely worn out. The Islamic Emirate of Afghanistan with its own funds recently rebuilt the highway.

== Sections ==
=== Kabul to Kandahar ===
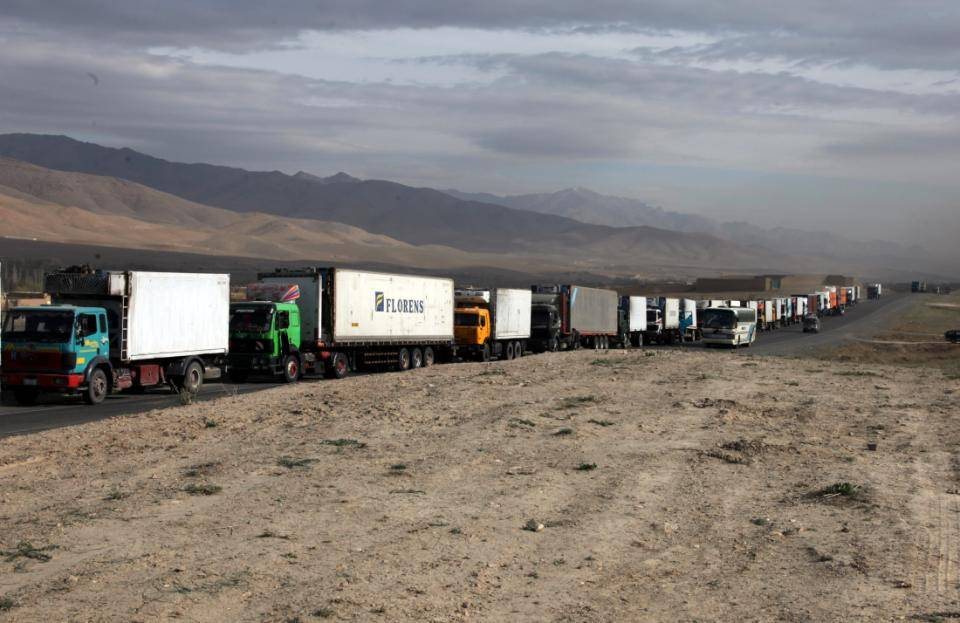
Kabul–Kandahar Highway in Wardak Province in 2010

The Kabul–Kandahar Highway (NH0101) is a 483 km (300 mi) section of National Highway 01 linking two of Afghanistan's largest cities, Kabul and Kandahar. This highway is a key portion of the Ring Road. Approximately 35 percent of Afghanistan's population lives within 50 km (31 mi) of the Kabul to Kandahar portion of the Ring Road.

The Kabul–Kandahar highway underwent some repairs. Phase one of paving was completed in December 2003 and the highway was opened to traffic. However, the road has badly deteriorated since that time. It was recently rebuilt by the Islamic Emirate of Afghanistan.

=== Kandahar to Herat ===
National Highway 01 between Kandahar and Herat consists of two sections, NH0101, between Kandahar and Delaram, and NH0102, between Delaram and Herat.

=== Herat to Badghis ===
Latest repair work on the Herat–Badghis Road was completed in December 2025.

=== Kabul to Jalalabad ===
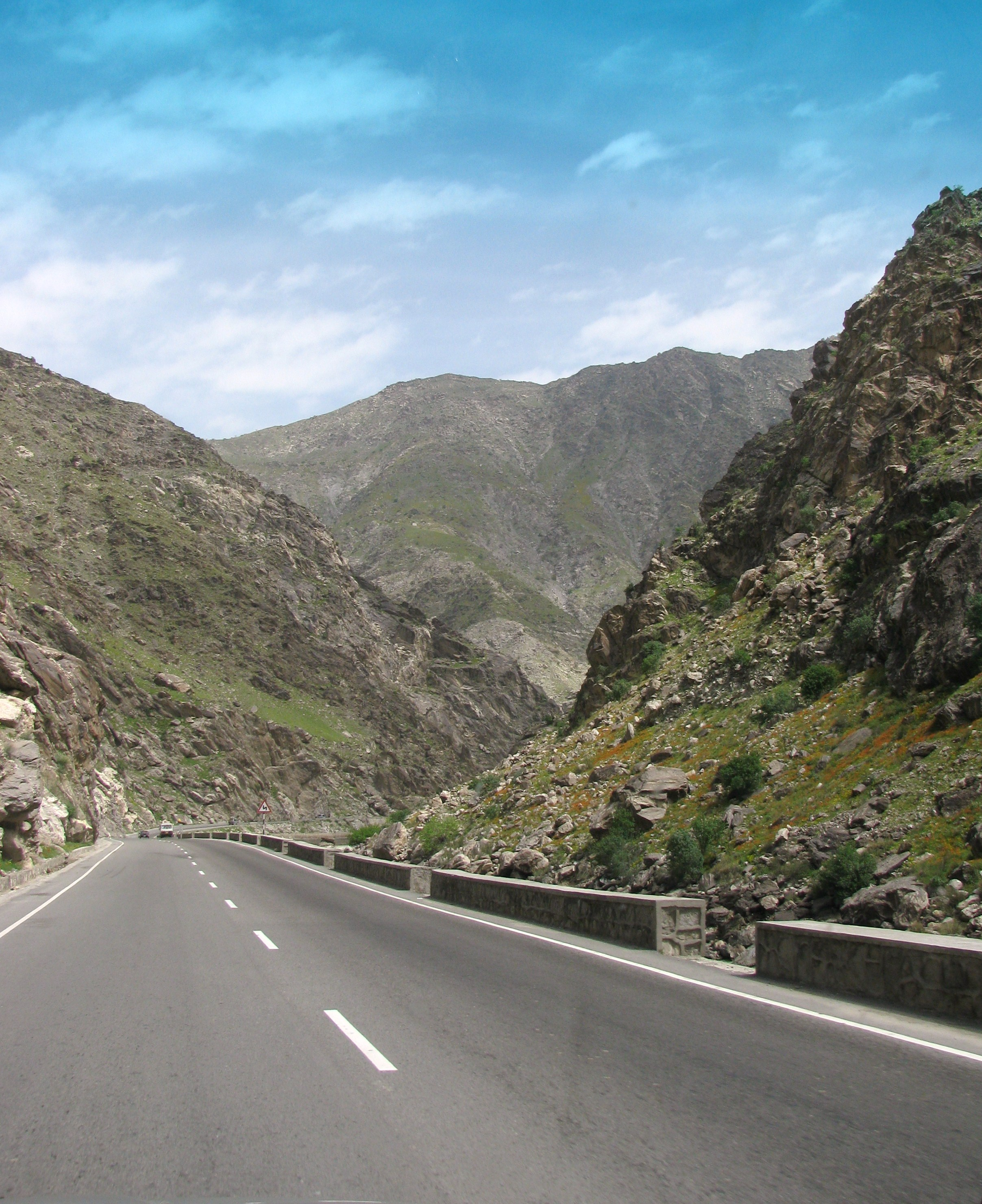
The Kabul–Jalalabad Road

National Highway 8 (NH08) runs from Jalalabad to Kabul, following the Tang-e Gharu gorge, parallel to the Kabul River, for 64 km (40 mi). The two-lane Kabul Gorge highway runs along 600 m (2,000 ft) cliffs. Fatal traffic accidents occur in this area, mainly due to reckless driving.

== See also ==
- Transport in Afghanistan
