= Nimruz Province =

Province of Afghanistan

Nimruz Province د نيمروز ولايت ولایت نیمروز
- Province
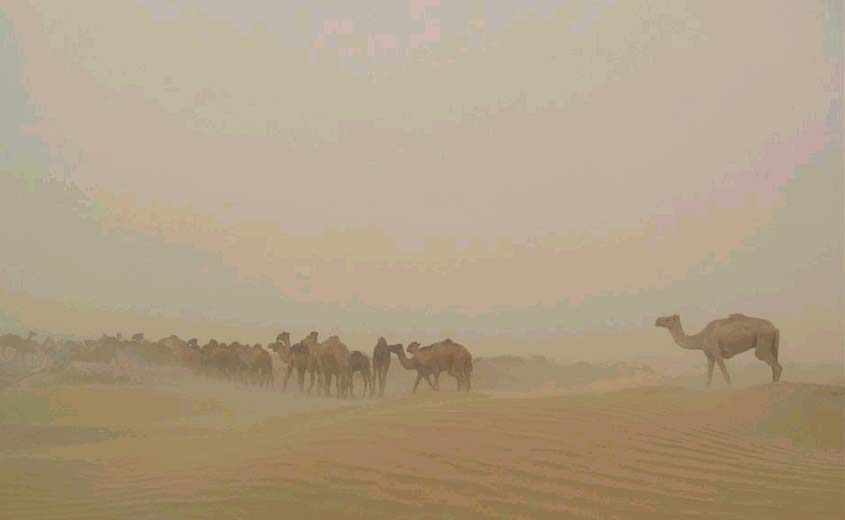
- Chakhansur in Nimruz Province

- Map of Afghanistan with Nimruz highlighted
- Coordinates (Capital): 31.0°N 62.5°E
- Country: Afghanistan
- Capital: Zaranj

Government
  - Governor: Abdul Manan Mahmud
  - Deputy Governor: Mawlawi Najibullah Badakhshi
  - Police Chief: Sardar Mohammad Ayoubi

Area
  - Total: 43,000 km^{2} (17,000 sq mi)

Population (2021)
  - Total: 186,963
  - Density: 4.3/km^{2} (11/sq mi)
- Time zone: UTC+4:30 (Afghanistan Time)
- Postal code: 43xx
- ISO 3166 code: AF-NIM
- Main languages: Pashto; Balochi; Dari

Nimruz Province (Pashto (Note: Pashto pronunciation: [nimˈɾoz]) and Dari: (Note: Dari pronunciation: [niːmˈɾoːz]) نیمروز, lit. 'Half-day'), also spelled Nimroz, is one of the 34 provinces of Afghanistan, located in the southwestern part of the country. It lies to the east of the Sistan and Baluchestan province of Iran and north of Balochistan, Pakistan, also bordering the Afghan provinces of Farah and Helmand. It has a population of around 186,000 people. The province is divided into five districts, encompassing about 649 villages.

The city of Zaranj serves as the provincial capital and Zaranj Airport, located in that city, serves as a domestic airport for the province. The recently built Kamal Khan Dam is located in Chahar Burjak District.

The name Nimruz means "mid-day" or "half-day" in Persian. The name is believed to indicate that the meridian cutting the old world in half passes through this region. Nimruz covers 43,000 km^{2}. It is the most sparsely populated province in the country, located in the Sistan Basin. A substantial part of the province is the barren desert area of Dasht-e Margo.

In 2021, the Taliban gained control of the province during the 2021 Taliban offensive.

== History ==
The name Zaranj was derived from Persian word "Zranka" and is considered to be one of the oldest cities in Nimruz Province. The area now composing Nimruz province of Afghanistan was once part of the historical region of Sistan, which over the many centuries was held by the Achaemenid Empire, Alexander the Great and others before being conquered and converted to Islam by the Muslim Arabs in the seventh century. The region became part of the Saffarid dynasty in 860 CE with its capital at Zaranj, which was one of the first local dynasties of the Islamic era. Its founder Yaqub Saffari was born and raised in this region. The territory became part of the Ghaznavids followed by the Ghurids, Timurids, and Safavids.

In the early 18th century, the region fell to the Afghan Hotaki dynasty until they were removed from power in 1738 by Nader Shah. By 1747, Ahmad Shah Durrani made it part of Afghanistan after he conquered the territory from northeastern Iran to Delhi in India. Under the modern Afghan government, the province was known as Chakhansur Province until 1968, when it was separated to form the provinces of Nimruz and Farah. The city of Zaranj became the capital of Nimroz province at that time. During the Soviet–Afghan War, Nimruz province was used by mujahideen crossing back and forth between Afghanistan and neighboring countries. It was also used by Afghan refugees escaping the war as well as by smugglers. Nimruz was also the headquarter of the Partisans of National Liberation of Afghanistan (PNLA) led by Abdul Karim Brahui.

As the Taliban came to power in 1995, they seized the road-controlling town of Delaram (now within Farah Province), and came to an agreement with local mujahideen commanders that the fate of the province would not be decided until a clear victor emerged in the capture of Kabul. However, the Taliban advanced on Nimruz only days later, and the mujahideen under command of Abdul Karim Brahui fled to Iran. The Taliban appointed Hamidullah Niyazmand as governor of Nimruz. Niyazmand, who grew up in Pakistan, made Urdu the official language of provincial administration.

=== 21st century ===
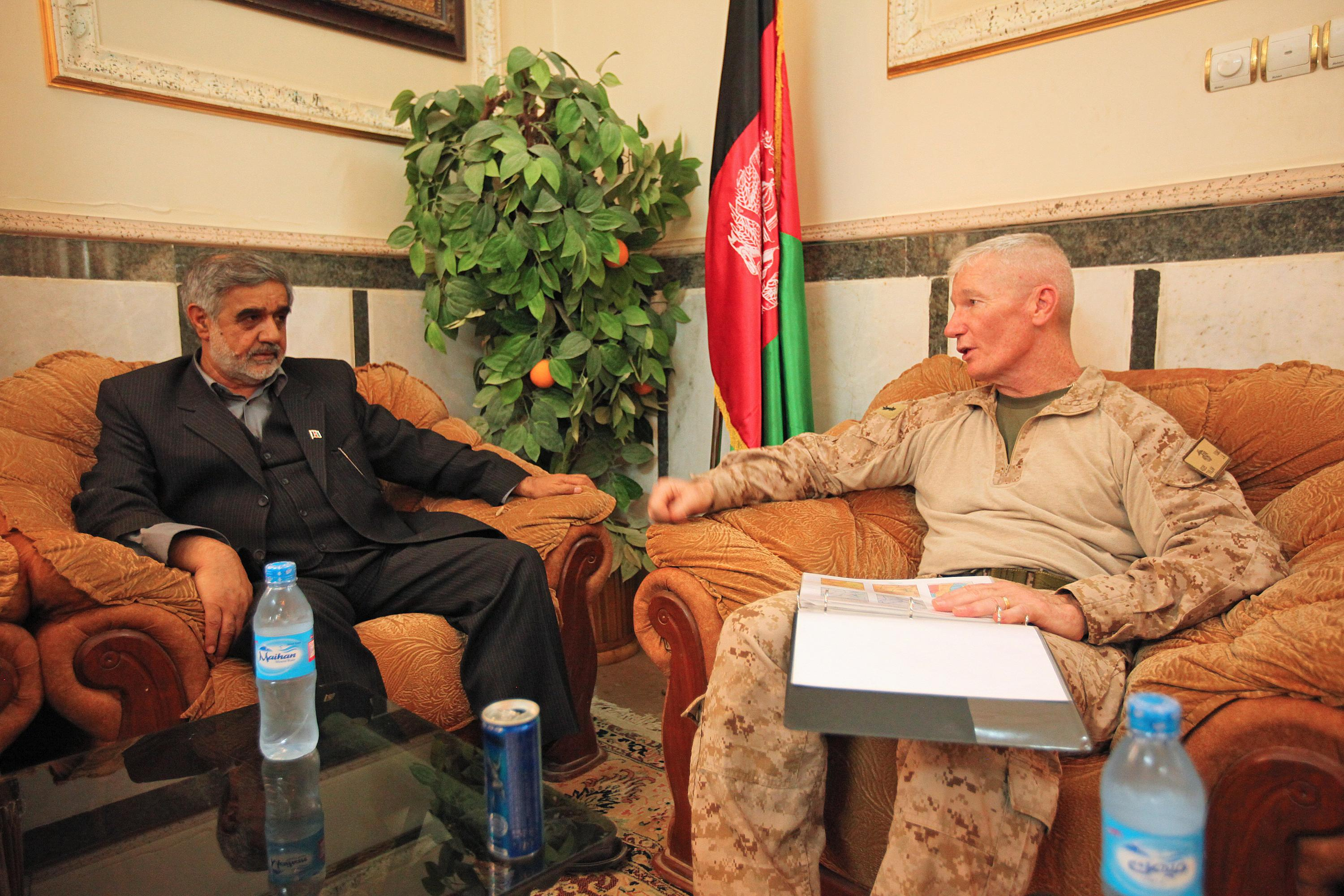
Former Governor General Abdul Karim Brahui and Maj. Gen. John A. Toolan, commanding general of Regional Command Southwest, discussing local issues in 2011.

Following the US-led invasion in October 2001, the Taliban began losing control of the province to the new Afghan government under President Hamid Karzai. The area is historically known for drugs and weapons smuggling between Afghanistan, Iran and Pakistan. Many foreign militants also use the province to go back and forth between the three nations. The Delaram–Zaranj Highway was built by the Indian government in 2009, which is one of the main trade routes in the country and is expected to boost the socio-economic development in the province.

Since 2002, members of the U.S. Marine Corps were present in the province. When the International Security Assistance Force (ISAF) arrived at Kandahar, Nimruz province became part of the Regional Command Southwest. The local Afghan National Security Forces (ANSF) were being trained by these forces. ISAF was also involved in development activities.

During the Taliban insurgency, Nimruz witnessed a number of militant attacks. In early 2009, militants attempted to kill Brahui in a suicide attack. In 2021, American forces withdrew from Afghanistan. On August 6, 2021, the Taliban overran Nimruz, when the Afghan government forces in the city of Zaranj, the 215th Corps, fled. There had been a lack of reinforcements from the government. The fleeing allowed the Taliban to take the city, including the government forces' "military bases and intelligence offices". The government forces then crossed over into Iran. The Taliban let the city's prisoners go free, but the most "notorious inmates" were already transferred to Kabul. The Taliban had been using prison breaks to degrade the security forces' morale and grow their own ranks. The takeover meant that Ashraf Ghani's government could no longer get revenue from the region's border crossings with Iran.

Baloch nationalists have had conflicts with the Taliban. Following the Taliban's takeover of Afghanistan in 2021, several Balochs have accused the group of having an anti-Baloch bias. Taliban commander Haji Umar Abdul Salam supposedly called upon Afghan Balochs to leave Afghanistan and move to neighbouring Iran.

In 2025, authorities announced plans to gradually move the provincial capital from Zaranj to Ghurghuri, the capital of Khashrod District.

== Geography ==
The Sistan Basin dominates the province. Many parts of the south are covered by the Godzareh Depression which includes marshes and dry lakes.

== Administrative divisions ==
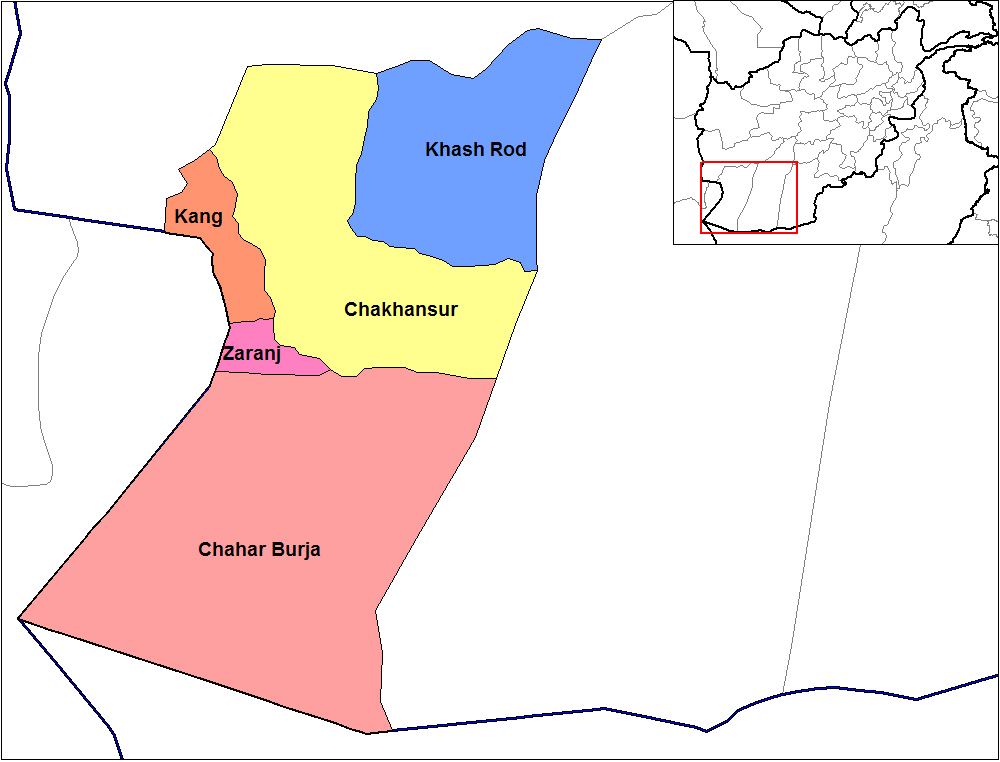
Map of the districts of Nimruz as of January 2004, prior to the redrawing of provincial and district boundaries later that year

Districts of Nimruz Province
District	Capital	Population	Area in km^{2}	Pop. density	Number of villages and ethnic groups
Chahar Burjak		29,893	20,730	1	65 villages. 88% Baloch, 10% Brahawi, 1% Pashtun, and 1% Tajik.
Chakhansur	Chakhansur	26,837	8,856	3	160 villages. Pashtun, Tajik and Baluch .
Kang		25,376	898	28	119 villages. 60% Pashtun, 25% Baloch, 15% Tajik.
Khash Rod	Khash	36,138	8,066	4	63 villages. 55% Pashtun, 20% Baluch, 15% Brahawi, 10% Tajik. Includes the Delaram District.
Zaranj	Zaranj	65,310	1,716	38	242 villages. 44% Baloch, 34% Pashtun, and 22% Tajik.
Nimruz		183,554	42,410	4	42.2% Balochi, 36.3% Pashtuns, 16.9% Tajiks, 4.6% Brahui.

== Economy ==
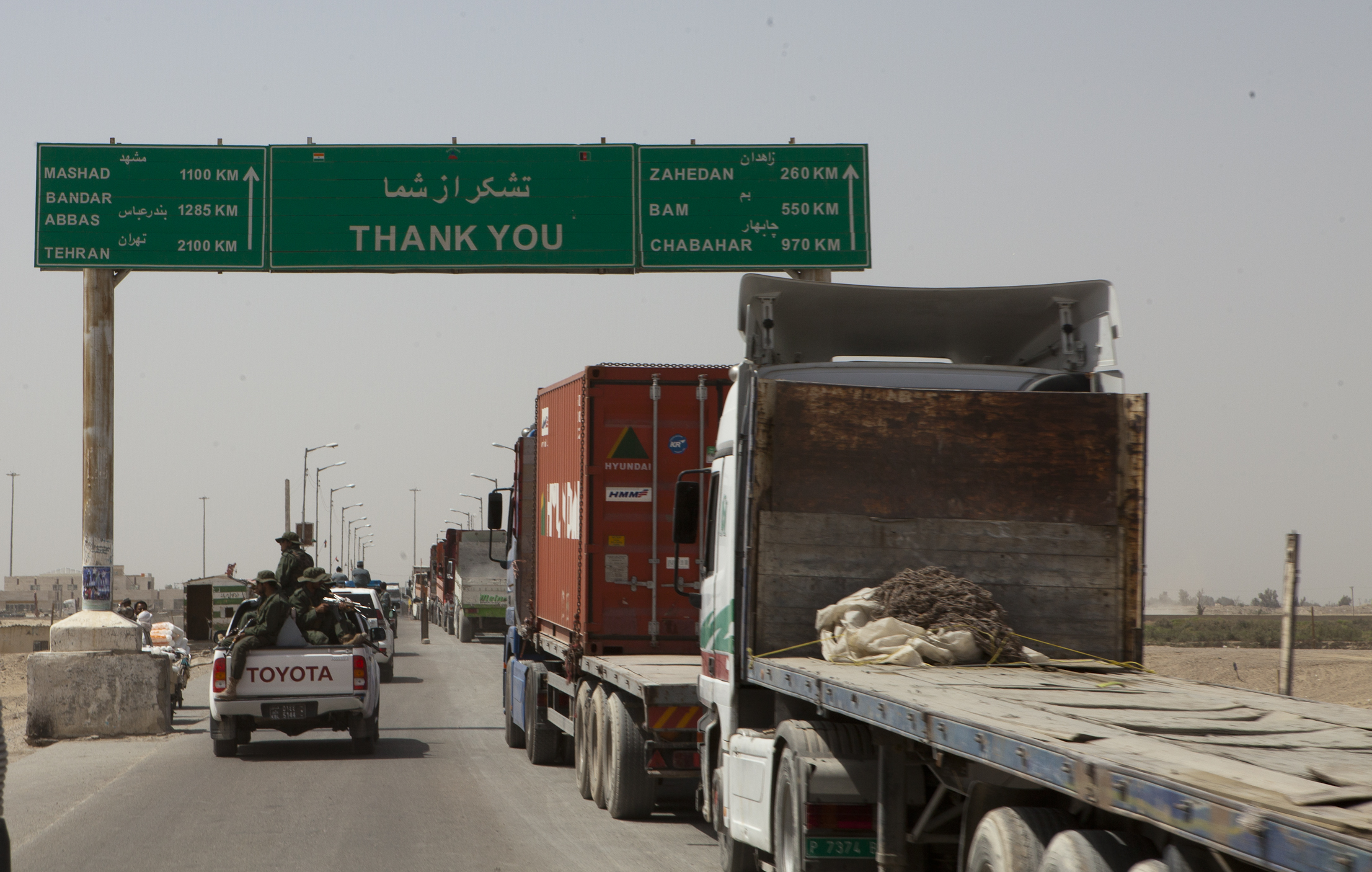
Delaram-Zaranj Highway at the Afghan-Iranian border crossing in Zaranj

As of June 2014 Zaranj Airport which is located near the city of Zaranj had regularly scheduled flights to Herat.

The Delaram–Zaranj Highway has been constructed by India via Chaknasur, which is expected to boost the socio economic development in the region.

Trade, farming, and herding is the main source of income for the majority. This includes agriculture and animal husbandry. Animals include sheep, goat, cattle, and poultry. The province produces the following: Wheat, corn, melons, poppies; almost all irrigated.

Nimruz has always been isolated the past. This led to one author in 2010 calling it Afghanistan's "forgotten province." Historically, the territory served as a major smuggling hub due to its border with Iran and Pakistan. The province became popular after the trade route between Iran and Afghanistan became operational, which provides another large income to the Afghan government.

== Demographics ==
=== Population ===
The NSIA puts the population of Nimruz Province at approximately 186,963 people. This estimate includes the many Kuchi nomads who inhabit the province seasonally and the native settled people.

=== Ethnicity, languages and religion ===
The province is mainly dominated by Pashtun and Baloch ethnic groups. Although Balochs were the majority in the province, recent immigration of Pashtuns has made it a Pashtun-majority province. The Pashtun tribes are mostly Barakzai and Nurzai. Nimroz has had mostly ethnic Pashtun and few Tajik governors. Other communities in Nimroz province include the Brahui, Tajik, Uzbek, and Hazara. Almost all inhabitants except the predominantly Shia Hazaras follow Sunni Islam. Languages spoken in the province are Pashto, Balochi and Dari.

Estimated ethnolinguistic and -religious composition
Ethnicity	Baloch	Pashtun	Tajik/ Farsiwan	Uzbek	Brahui	Others	Sources
Period	Baloch	Pashtun	Tajik/ Farsiwan	Uzbek	Brahui	Others	Sources

2004–2021 (Islamic Republic)	<40 – 61%	25 – 60%	5 – 10%	2 – 10%	≤5%	≤3%
2020 EU	1st	–	–	–	–	–
2018 UN	<40% (Note: 40% incl. Baloch, Brahui, Tajik and Hazara.)	60%	∅	–	∅	∅
2015 CSSF (Note: Demographic information is based on data from 2015.)	60%	25%	5%	2%	5%	3%
2015 CP	61%	27%	10%	10%	–	–
2015 NPS	∅	∅ (Note: incl. Barakzai, Noorzai and Kuchi.)	∅	∅	∅	–
2011 PRT	61%	27% (Note: excl. Kuchi.)	10%	10%	–	–
2011 USA	61%	27%	10%	10%	–	–
2009 ISW	majority	significant minority	–	–	–	–

Legend:
- ∅: Ethnicity mentioned in source but not quantified
- –: Ethnicity not mentioned specifically
- Source abbreviations: Empirical sources: –, Government sources: CP – Colombo Plan, EU – European Union Agency for Asylum, PRT – Provincial Reconstruction Team of the United States government, UN – United Nations Assistance Mission in Afghanistan, Editorial sources: CSSF – Center for the Scientific Study of Families, ISW – Institute for the Study of War, NPS – Naval Postgraduate School, USA – United States Army

=== Education ===
The overall literacy rate (6+ years of age) increased from 22% in 2005 to 23% in 2011. The overall net enrolment rate (6–13 years of age) increased from 33% in 2005 to 49% in 2011.

=== Health ===
The percentage of households with clean drinking water fell from 38% in 2005 to 24% in 2011. The percentage of births attended to by a skilled birth attendant increased from 7% in 2005 to 28% in 2011.

== See also ==
- Provinces of Afghanistan
