= High Governorate of Farah =

Defunct province in southwestern Afghanistan, 1860s–1964

Province of Farah (1860s–1921) ولایت فراه Wilāyat-i Farāh High Governorate of Farah (1921–1964) حکومت اعلی فراه Ḥokūmat-i ʿĀlā-yi Farāh
- Province/High Governorate of Afghanistan
- c. 1863–30 April 1964
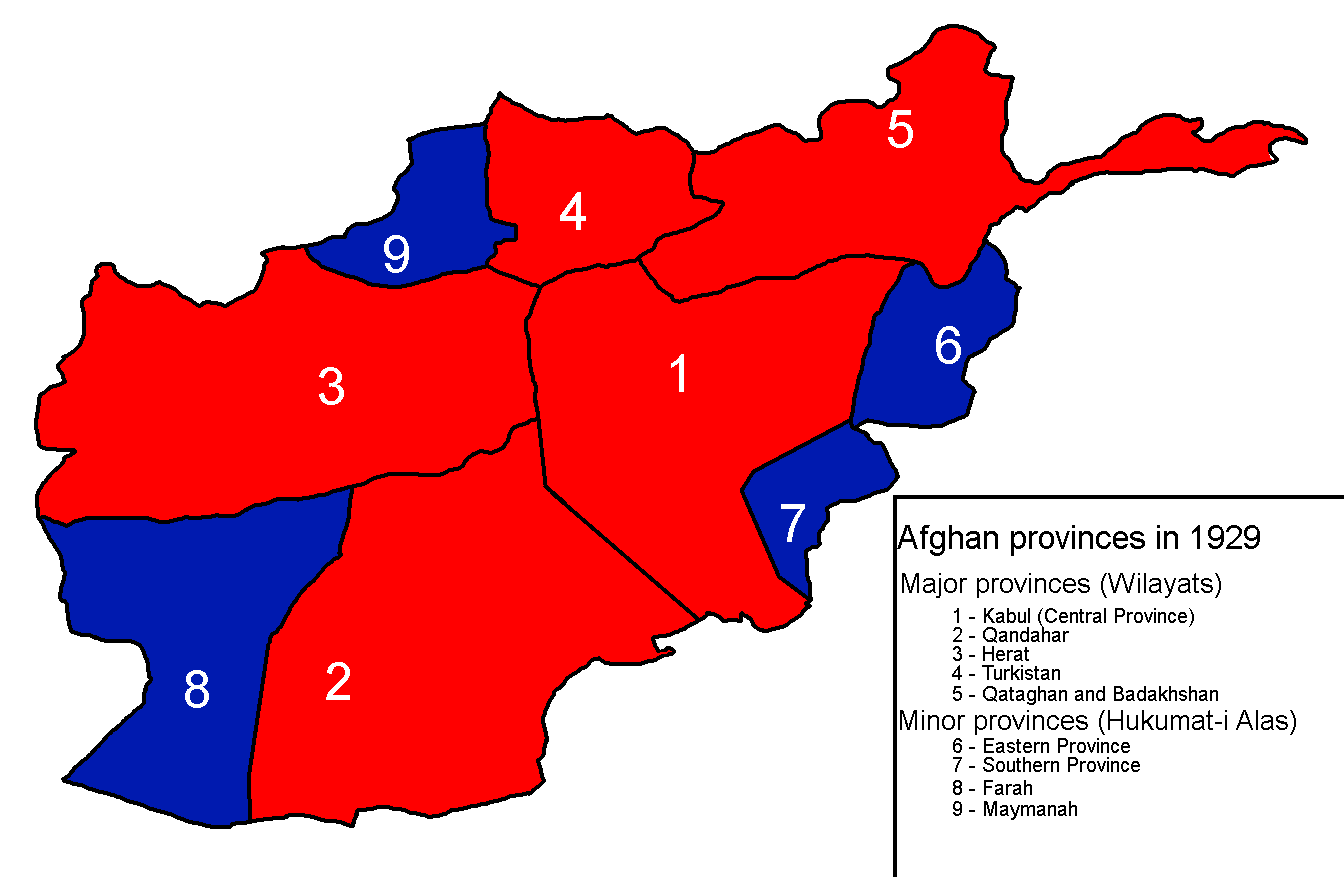
- Farah (#8) in 1929
- Capital: Farah
  - Type: Province (1860s–1921); High Governorate (1921–1964)
- History
  - Established: c. 1863
  - Disestablished: 30 April 1964
Preceded by
1860s: Emirate of Herat (Farah)
1882: Chiefdom of Sanjaran (Chakhansur)
1893: Province of Kandahar (Pusht-i-Rud)
Succeeded by
1921: Province of Kandahar (Pusht-i-Rud)
1964: Province of Farah
1964: Province of Nimruz
- Today part of: Afghanistan

The Province of Farah (Dari: ولایت فراه, romanized: Wilāyat-i Farāh), also known as the Province of Farah-Chakhansur (Dari: ولایت فراه-چخانسور, romanized: Wilāyat-i Farāh-Čaḫānsūr) and, since 1921, as the High Governorate of Farah (Dari: حکومت اعلی فراه, romanized: Ḥokūmat-i ʿĀlā-yi Farāh), was an administrative division of Afghanistan that existed from the 1860s to 1964.

It encompassed the southwestern corner of Afghanistan, including the historically significant region of Afghan Sistan, and bordered Persia (modern-day Iran) to the west and British Baluchistan to the south. In 1964, it was divided into the present-day provinces of Farah and Nimruz.

== History ==
=== Formation of the province under Sher Ali Khan ===
Prior to the reign of Emir Sher Ali Khan, the area of Farah had been administered as a subordinate entity of the Emirate of Herat, one of the de facto independent successor states of the Durrani Empire and a dominant regional center. Following the death of Emir Dost Mohammad Khan on 9 June 1863—only days after the final conquest of Herat, which completed the territorial reunification of Afghanistan—his son and successor Sher Ali Khan undertook a reorganization of the country's administrative structure in the following years.

As part of this process, although the exact date during his reign (which spanned the civil war from 1863 to 1866 and again from 1869 to 1878) is not specified, Farah was detached from Herat and established as a separate province. Sher Ali Khan entrusted its governance to his cousin, Sardar Mohammad Afzal (not to be confused with Mohammad Afzal Khan, the emir's half-brother and future rival).

The formation of the province served a dual purpose. By detaching Farah from Herat, Sher Ali Khan reduced the administrative weight of a city whose semi-independent traditions posed a latent challenge to Kabul's authority. At the same time, placing a loyal kinsman in command of the southwestern borderlands helped secure a strategically exposed frontier at a time when the new emir's hold on power remained contested.

=== Districts and territorial extent ===
The province, as constituted by Sher Ali Khan, brought together territories that had previously been divided between the orbit of Herat and the nominally independent Sistani polities to the south. The southernmost portion of the province—the district of Chakhansur, corresponding to the Sistan basin and the lower Helmand delta—had long been governed by the Sanjarani Baloch, a tribal dynasty that had established itself in the region in the early nineteenth century.

The Sanjarani sardar Ibrahim Khan had aligned himself with Kabul during the reign of Sher Ali Khan, but continued to exercise effective local autonomy. Under Abdur Rahman Khan, who came to power in 1880, the central government moved to bring the region under direct control. In 1882 (1299 Solar Hijri), Ibrahim Khan Sanjarani was defeated in battle by the governor of Farah, and his fort was captured, ending the semi-independent Sanjarani chieftaincy and incorporating Chakhansur fully into the provincial administration.

Colonel Edmond Elles, writing in The Military Geography of Afghanistan (1893), noted that no clear dividing line could be drawn between the provinces of Farah and Kandahar, and described the province as also encompassing the district of Pusht-i-Rud (modern Girishk/Nahr-e Saraj), formerly associated with Kandahar. The Historical and Political Gazetteer of Afghanistan by Ludwig W. Adamec, which incorporated the formerly classified British Gazetteer of Afghanistan (compiled in 1914), records that by 1912 the province was divided into seven districts:

1. Lash-Juwain/Hokat
2. Farah (provincial capital)
3. Sistan/Chakhansur
4. Shahiwan
5. Gulistan
6. Bakwa
7. Pusht-i-Rud/Girishk

=== Reclassification as a High Governorate (1921) ===
Following Afghanistan's full independence from British suzerainty in 1919, King Amanullah Khan introduced a comprehensive reorganization of the country's subnational administration. The regulation on the territorial divisions of Afghanistan (Dari: نظامنامه تقسیمات ملکیه افغانستان, romanized: niẓāmnāmah-i taqsīmāt-i mulkīyah-i Afghānistān), issued in 1300 Solar Hijri (1921/22 Gregorian), established a tiered administrative hierarchy.

The former province of Farah was reclassified as a high governorate (Dari: حکومت اعلی, romanized: ḥukūmat-i ʿālā), a designation at the same level as provinces, with the difference that Farah was no longer headed by the viceroy of the government but by a high governor. Beneath this level, large governorates (headed by a ḥākim-i kalān) and ordinary governorates were arranged in descending order. Under this system, the high governorate of Farah encompassed the city of Farah and all districts to its south, including the entirety of Afghan Sistan, and Pusht-i-Rud was reincorporated into the province of Kandahar. The reform thus formalized the existing unity of the Farah-Chakhansur region within a single administrative unit, while redefining its constitutional status within the modernizing Afghan state.

=== Division into Farah and Nimruz (1964) ===
The Afghan Constitution of 1964 introduced the principle of balanced regional development and called for a rationalization of provincial boundaries. An administrative law established a formal hierarchy of provinces, large districts, districts, and sub-districts. As part of a broader reorganization on 30 April 1964, in which Afghanistan was restructured into 29 provinces, the High Governorate of Farah was divided into the two successor provinces of Farah, centred on the city of Farah and incorporating districts drawn in part from southern Herat, and Nimruz, carved primarily out of the former district of Chakhansur and Afghan Sistan, with Zaranj as its new administrative centre.

== See also ==
- Farah Province
- Nimruz Province
- Administrative divisions of Afghanistan
- Sistan

== Sources ==
- Statoids.com – Provinces of Afghanistan
