= Baloch people in Afghanistan =

بلۏچ مردم افغانستان ءِ تہا

Regions with significant populations
- Balochistan Afghanistan: (Nimruz; Helmand; Kandahar)

Languages
- Balochi, Brahvi, Pashto, and Dari

Religion
- Predominantly Islam

Baloch people in Afghanistan live in the southwestern regions of Balochistan Afghanistan, along the border with Iran and Pakistan. The number of the Baloch in Afghanistan is estimated at around 300,000–500,000 people or roughly 0.5% of the population of Afghanistan. Some estimates place the Afghan Baloch population as low as 90,000.

Afghan Balochs have a presence in the Helmand, Nimruz and Kandahar provinces of southern Afghanistan. However, due to the prolonged Afghan conflict, most Balochs in Afghanistan fled the country to sought refuge in neighbouring Iran and Pakistan. The Taliban has often been accused of having an anti-Baloch bias.

== History ==
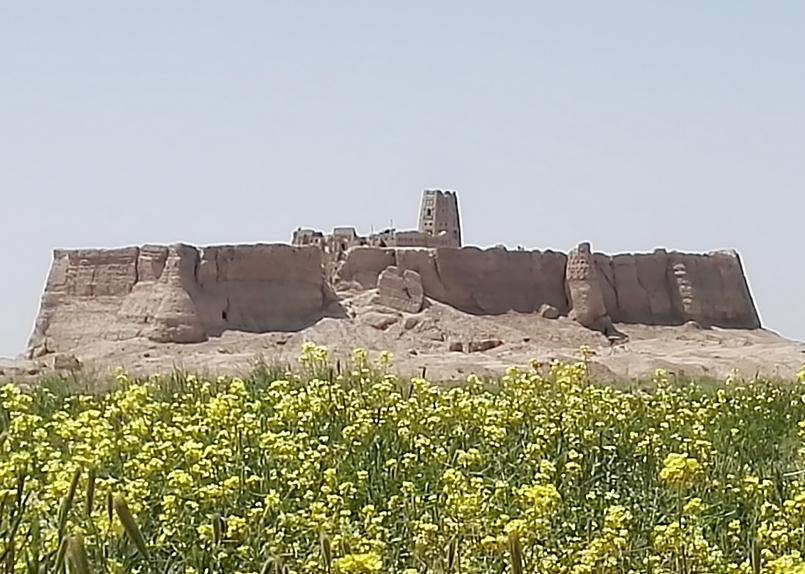
Ibrahim Khan Baloch Fort

The history of the Baloch presence in the land that is today called Afghanistan goes back early time. The author of the history of Sistan, in the description of the massacre and destruction of many, the Baloch and Majus around Hamun Lake, and mentions the presence of the Baloch in Sistan Basin (modern-day Balochistan in Nimruz province) the fifth century.

Šahrestānīhā ī Ērānšahr is a surviving Middle Persian text on Sasanian administrative geography and history, based on the source, Padishkhwārgar was a Sasanian province in and People who contributed to building 21 cities in Padishkhwargar were Baloch. Padishkhwargar was most probably located in southern hindukush.

Muhammad bin Khwandshah bin Mahmud, known as Mirkhvand, narrated in the book of Rawżat aṣ-ṣafāʾ, the battle of the Baloch led by Baloch Shah against Mubarak Shah the Khan of the Chagatai Khanate in Herat.

The Baloch chiefdom, the Sanjranis family who ruled Sistan with its capital at Chakansur in the early and late 19th century. Ibrahim Khan Sanjrani Fort is reported to belong to Sanjrani Chiefdom. It was a union of the Baloch tribes under the leadership of Sardar Ebrahim Khan Sanjarani and Sardar Sharif Nahrui. The battle between Ibrahim Khan Sanjrani Baloch and Abdur Rahman Khan took place on 1299/1882. Ibrahim Khan were defeated and the Afghan governor of Farāh captured the fort.

Baloch chieftains in Nimroz, Helmand, Farah and west bank of the river(Hirmand) had independent governments and were autonomous rulers of the region before the Goldsmith Treaty. Wars and conflicts from Britain and its Qajar subordinates led to the disintegration of these regions and the collapse of the Baloch government. This region was organized and controlled by the Baloch tribes. Several disputes occurred between the Persia government, the British army, and the local Baloch rulers at that time, which resulted in the loss of power from the Baloch rulers.

Nasir Khan I Ahmadzai the sixth Baloch ruler of Kalat was one of the most prominent and influential rulers of the Khanate of Kalat. He played a crucial role in consolidating Baloch power, unifying the Baloch tribes, and shaping the political and administrative structure of the Khanate. Balochistan, Afghanistan was a part of Baloch rulers. The Baloch were present in Kandahar, Nimroz, Helmand and other parts of present-day Afghanistan during the rule of the Khanate of Kalat.

Front of Nimruz was founded in 1979 in Nimruz province of Afghanistan by Abdul Karim Brahui and Gul Mohammad Rahimi. It was a Baloch nationalist guerrilla group, representing the Baloch people of southwestern Afghanistan.

A number of Baloch migrated to Turkmenistan from the Chakhansur region in Afghanistan Nimroz province during the Soviet war in Afghanistan. The Baloch of Turkmenistan in the Merv and inner delta of the Murghab River are originally from the western and northern areas of Herat, Afghanistan, Chakhansur District in Nimroz Province, and Iran, who migrated in the mid-19th century.

=== Afghan conflict ===
The Partisans of National Liberation of Afghanistan (PNLA) was an anti-Soviet militia founded in 1979 in Nimruz province of Afghanistan by Abdul Karim Barahavi and Gul Mohammad Rahimi. It consisted mostly of Baloch nationalists.

The Balochs of Afghanistan declined sharply following the prolonged Afghan conflict, during the course of which many Balochs fled to neighbouring Iran and Pakistan. Baloch nationalists have also had conflicts with the Taliban. Following the Taliban's takeover of Afghanistan in 2021, several Balochs have accused the group of having an anti-Baloch bias. Taliban commander Haji Umar Abdul Salam supposedly called upon Afghan Baloch to leave Afghanistan and move to neighbouring Iran.

== Culture ==
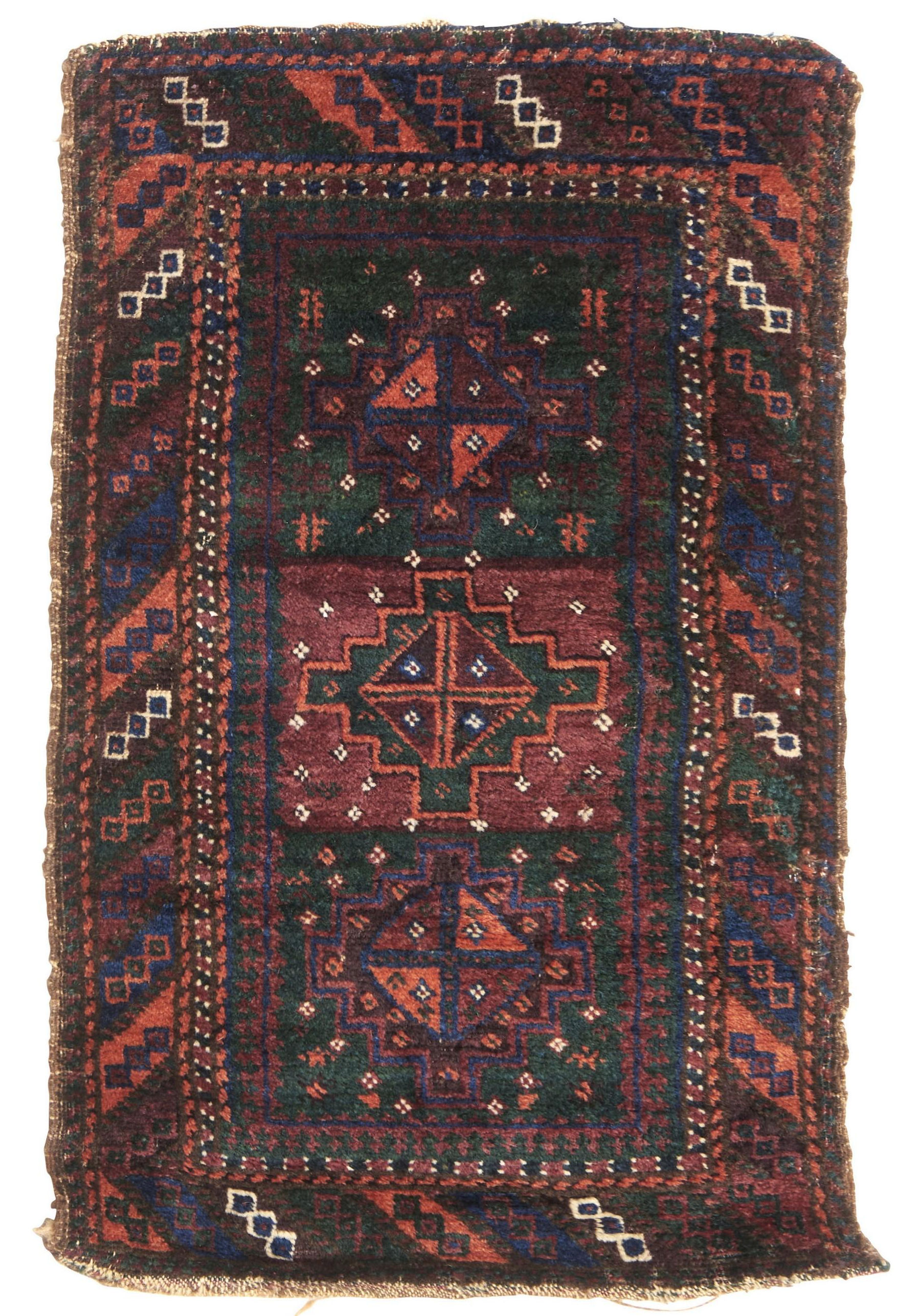
Balochi Balisht (pillow), late 19th century, Nimruz

Rug weaving is a common profession among the Baloch tribes of Afghanistan. Balochi rugs, floor coverings made by the Baloch, are often sold in the Herat local market and global market.

The Baloch have their own dress code and have preserved the Baloch dress, which is their ancient tradition.Balochi needlework and Balochi handicrafts are the art of Baloch women in Afghanistan. Baloch women wear clothes called Za Asteen Guptan, which are designed on Baloch needlework and embroidery.

Keeping and breeding camels, as well as holding camel riding competitions in Nimroz province, is popular among the Baloch.

The Baloch in Afghanistan speak the Balochi language. In the fall of 1978, Balochi was recognized as an official language of Afghanistan, alongside Pashto and Dari. A weekly newspaper in Balochi began publication in September 1978.

One of the famous Baloch customs is Chelo or Ramadani, where at the end of Eid(festival), the doors of houses are knocked on and the owners of the houses give them money, wheat, rice and biscuits. Another Baloch tradition in Afghanistan is called Shek Satin or Shab Nashini, where friends and acquaintances gather together on the night of Eid and stay up all night until morning.

== Notable people ==
Ghulam Mohammad Lalzad Baloch is a Baluchi language broadcast journalist, based in Toronto, Canada. He is originally from Nimroz Afghanistan. He was with the Baluchi service of All India Radio from 1974 to 2003.

Mohammad Naeem Baloch served as the governor of the Helmand Province in Afghanistan from 2012 until 2015. Prior to that, he worked as an Afghan intelligence officer in the Helmand Province.

Abdul Karim Brahui last served as Governor of Nimroz Province from 2010 to 2012, and before that he served as a minister in the Cabinet of Afghanistan. From February 2009 to August 2010, Brahui served as Minister of Refugees. In 2004, He was appointed as Minister of Borders and Tribal Affairs. He was the head of the Baloch Council of Afghanistan for a while.

Mohammad Nader Baloch from Chakhansor district and graduated from the military faculty and then served as military officer. He served as chairman of the National Council of the Baloch of Afghanistan and elected representative of the people of Nimroz Province in the Senate.

Naeema Baloch was the head of the Afghan women Police before the Taliban came to power.

Farida Hamidi a Baloch women politician who was a representative of the people of Nimroz province in the 16th term of the House of the People(Afghanistan).

Razia Baloch was member of the Helmand Provincial Council. She participated in a Key Leader Engagement regarding women's education in southern Afghanistan at the Kandahar International Airport, Afghanistan. (13 March 2014).

Ghazi Sher Jan Baloch, who lived in the early 1920s, is a hero among the Baloch of Afghanistan, and songs are sung about him even today.

Baloch of Afghanistan

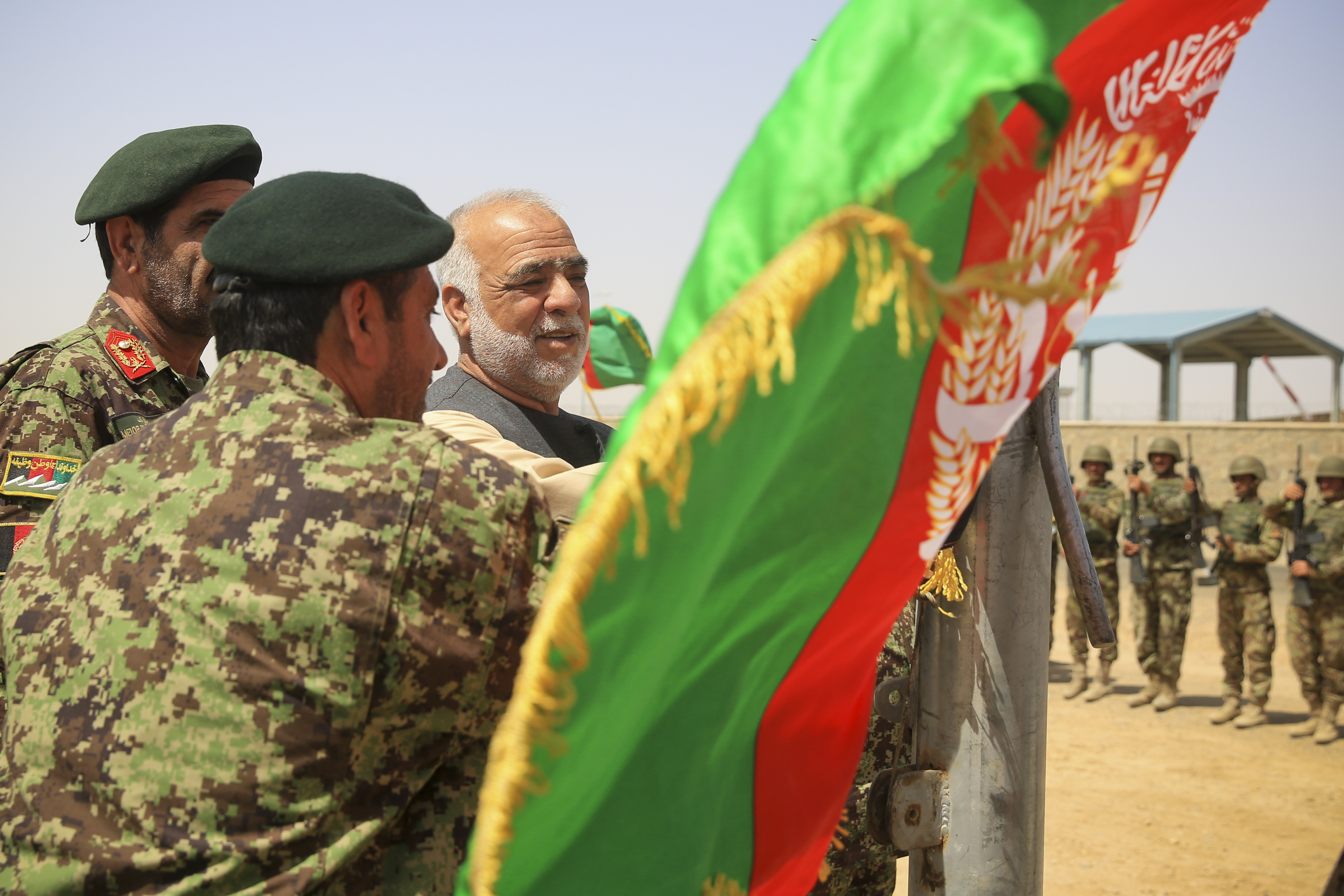
Naeem Baloch, center, the former governor of Helmand province

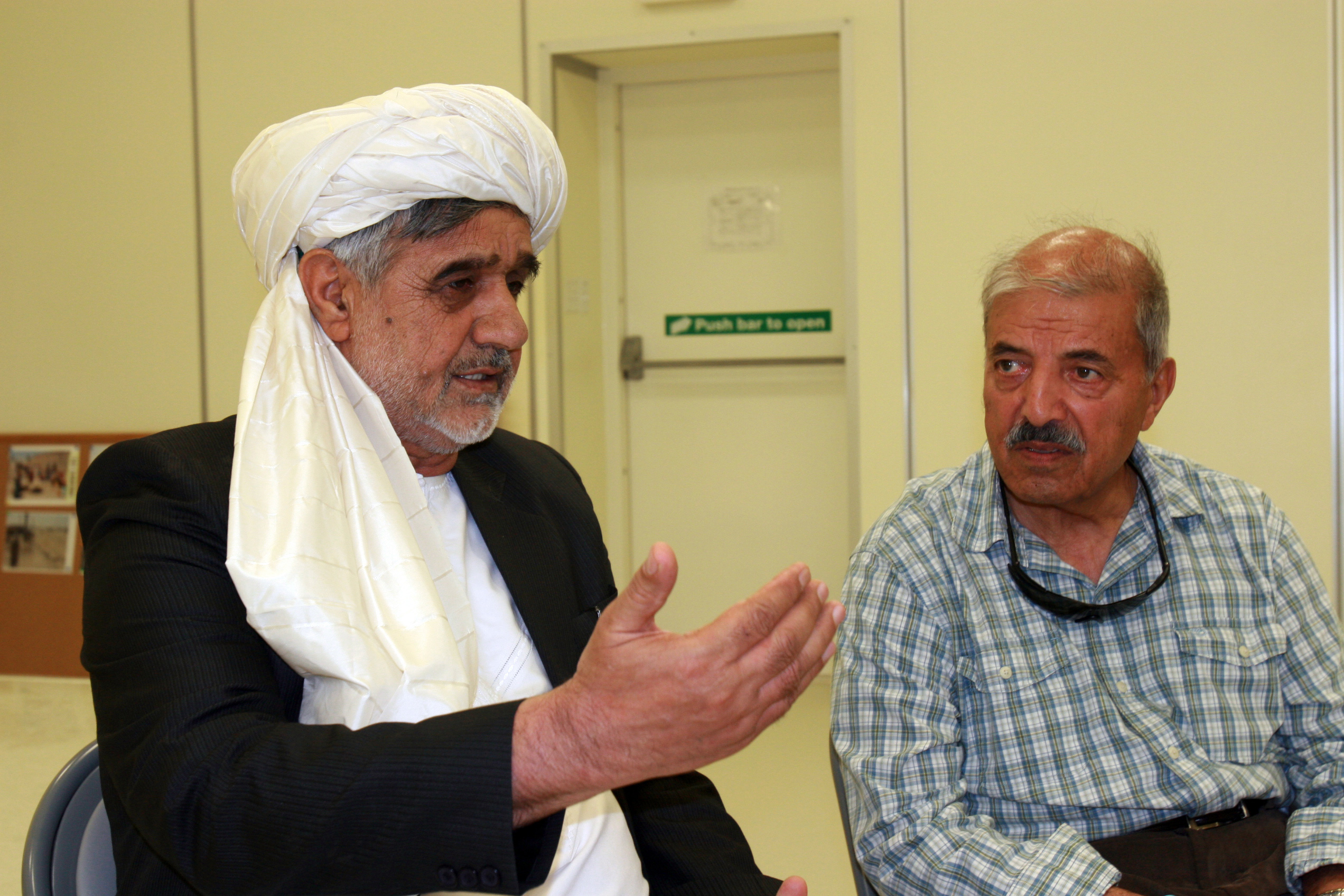
Nimroz former Provincial Gov. Abdul Karim Barahavi

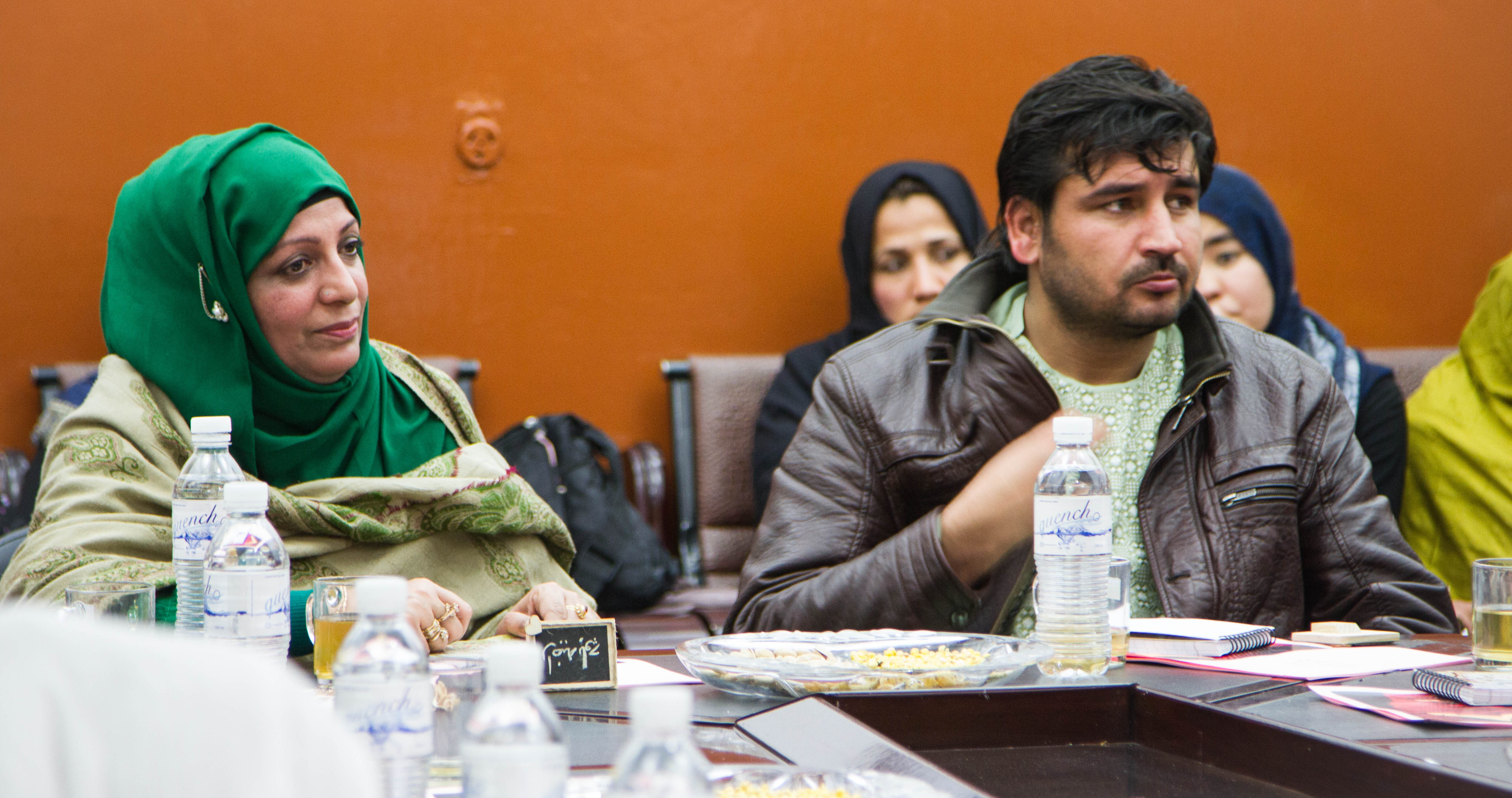
Razia Baloch (right), member of the Helmand Provincial Council.

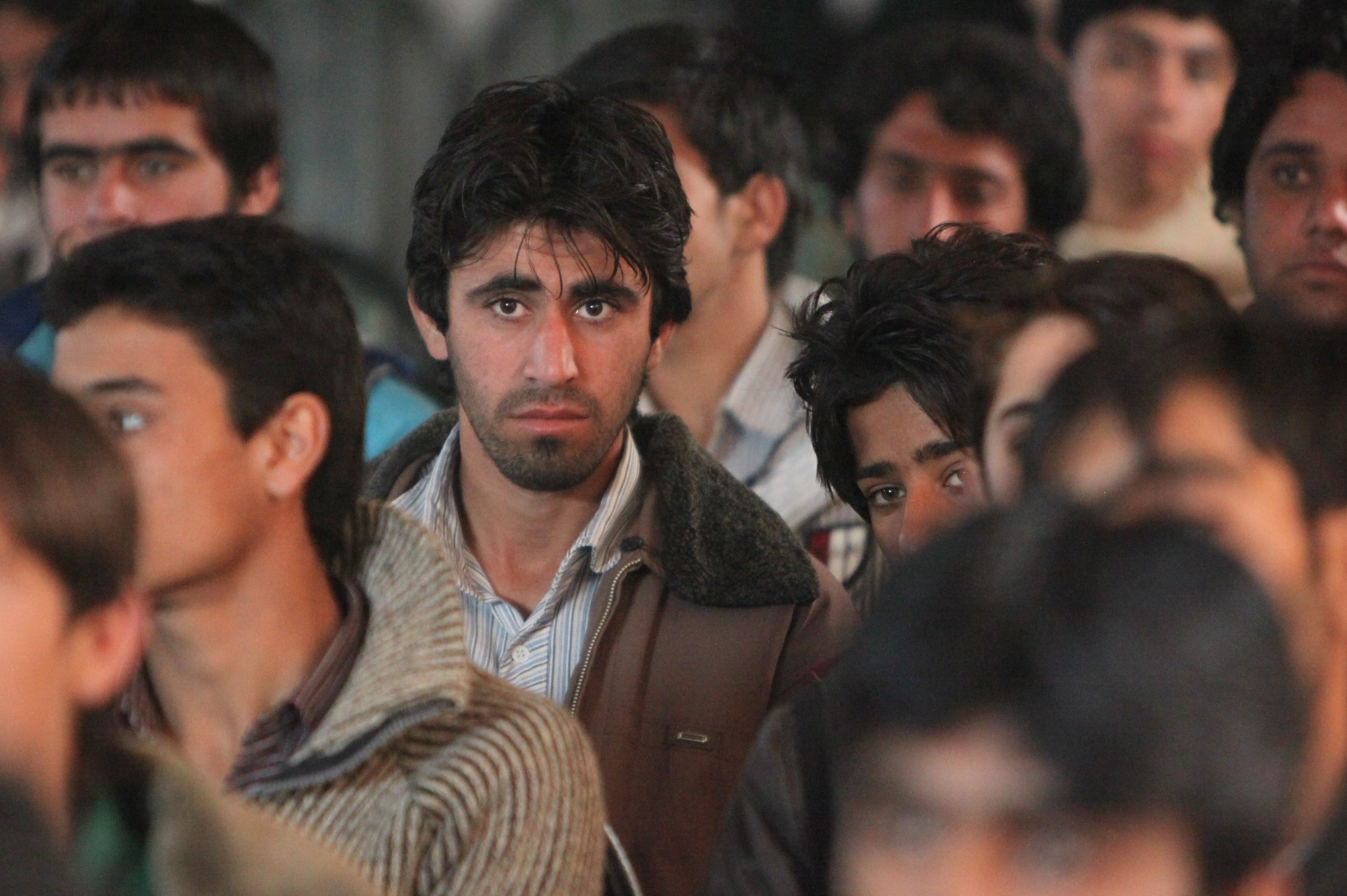
A Baloch man from Zaranj

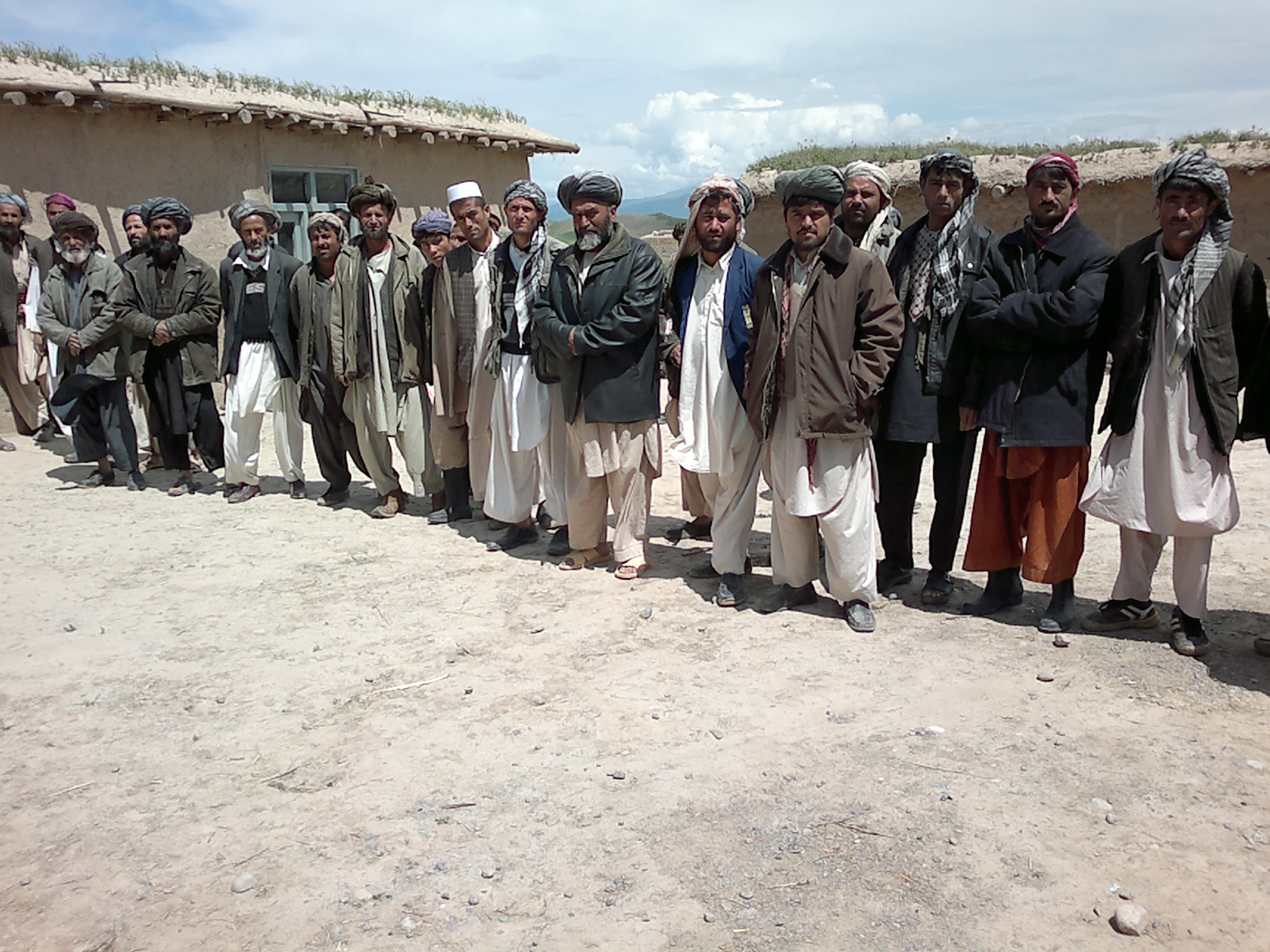
Baloch men in Qaradingo community of Rustaq district, Takhar province

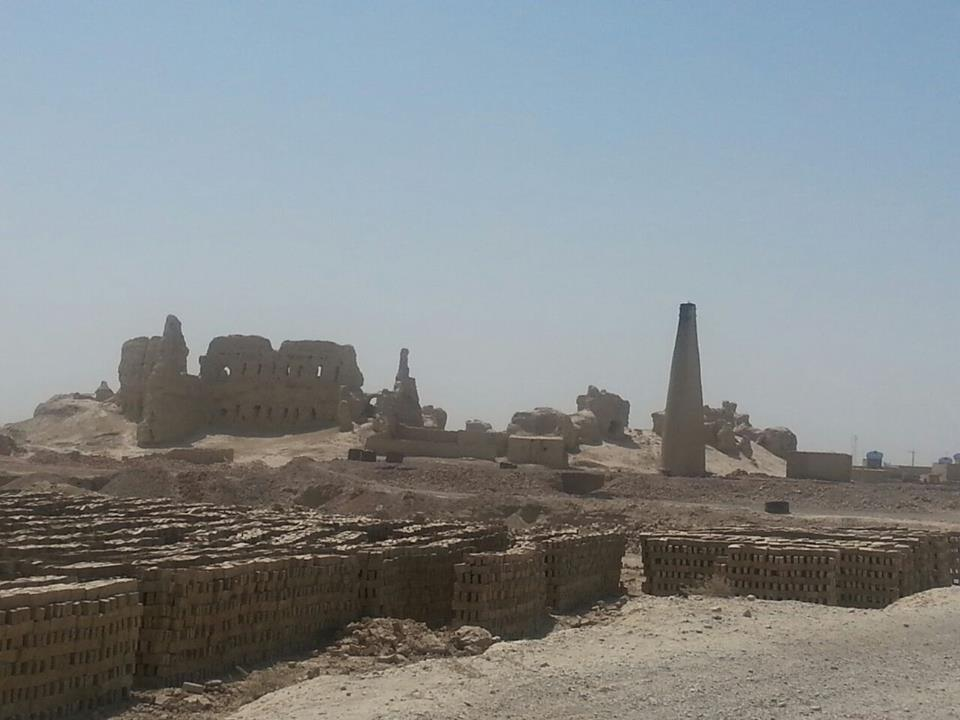
Qala-e-Mohammad is a village in Zaranj district of Nimroz province

== See also ==
- Ethnic groups in Afghanistan
- Balochistan, Afghanistan
