= Tojg =

- Village
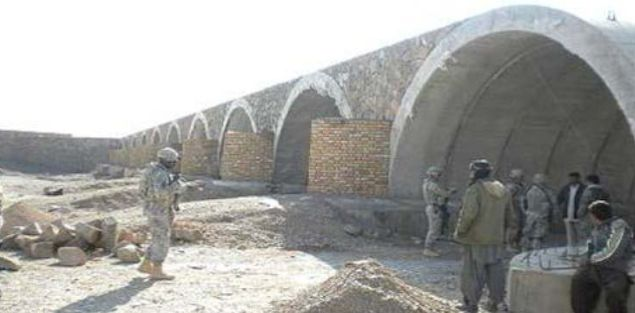
- Bridge under construction

- Location in Afghanistan
- Coordinates: 32°4′7″N 61°48′21″E
- Country: Afghanistan
- Province: Farah Province
- District: Lash wa Juwayn District

Population
  - Total: 10,000
- Time zone: + 4.30

Tojg (Pashto: توګ) is a large village in Farah Province, in western Afghanistan, located about 45 kilometres southwest of the city of Farah. It has a population of around 10,000.

== Geography ==
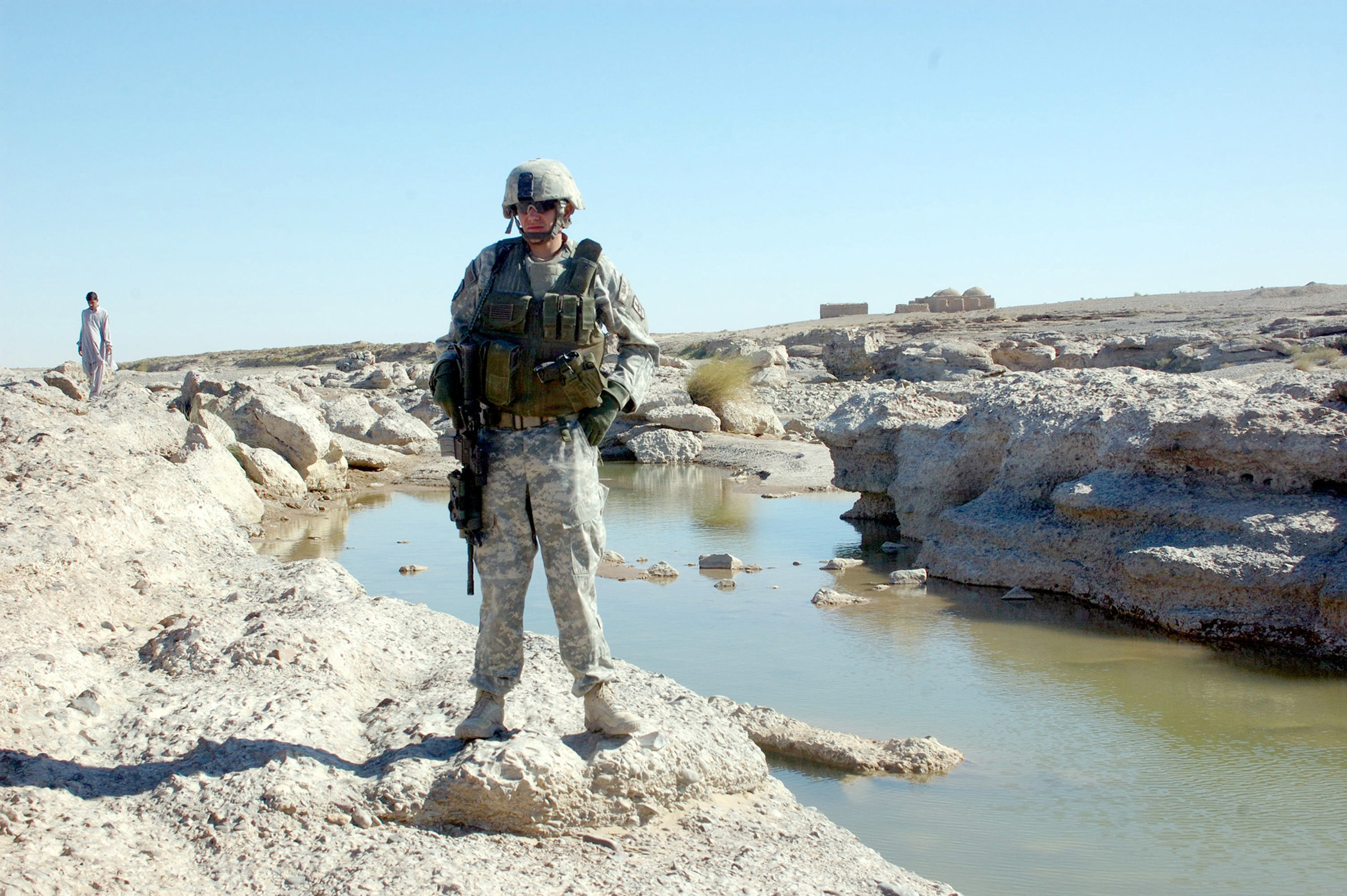
US military engineers survey a planned bridge in Tojg, Lash wa Juwayn district

The village is located north by road from Lash-e Joveyn and Lake Puzak and south of Farah. The Farah River is the major river flowing to the east of the village.

== Economy ==
The people of Tojg are mainly dependent upon agriculture; many fields exist around the village. One problem, however, was that for many years the Farah River would be prone to seasonal flooding, which prevents local farmers from accessing the main road and their farmlands, restricting transportation of their goods to market. In order to address this, the US-led Provincial Reconstruction Teams (PRTs) constructed the Tojg Bridge across the Farah River near the village, a project costing $1.7 million, financed by the Commander's Emergency Response Program (CERP). The construction of the 300-meter-long, 12-meter-high bridge took place between 2007 and 2010 and employed several hundred local laborers and contractors. The project was jointly managed by several companies, namely Shir Pir Construction Company, Bradaran Noori, Kheyaban Construction Company, and Meihan Parwar. In December 2009, the bridge was reported to be 80% complete, but construction had been delayed and was ongoing into 2010. The bridge consists of reinforced concrete arches.

== Healthcare ==
Tojg contains a regional health clinic which serves some 14 villages in the surrounding district. It is subject to assessment and is overseen by officials from Farah City Hospital.
