= Kalbali (tribe) =

Balochi tribe

The Kalbali (Balochi: کلبالی , Persian: کلبعلی), also called Alizahi (Persian: علیزهی), are a tribe of Baloch people who live in Afghanistan, Iran, and Pakistan.

In Afghanistan the tribe's primary residence is the village of Juma Khan in the Chakhansur District, and in the Nezar area of the Kang District of Nimroz Province.

Most of the Kalbali tribe speak the Rakhshani dialect of the Balochi language, but Persian and Pashto languages are also spoken.
