= Ghulam Dastagir Azad =

Afghan politician

Ghulam Dastagir Azad (born 1950 in Kang District, Nimruz Province) is the former governor of Nimruz Province, Afghanistan, having served from 2005 to August 2010.

In 2008, Azad survived a suicide attack that killed four of his bodyguards.

In May 2010, 8 Suicide attackers entered Azad's office with intention to kill him. He survived all eight attacks, but two of his bodyguards died and Gul Makai Osmani, a female member of the Nimroz legislature, and a bystander were killed in this attack.

Unconfirmed reports state that following this attack, the Governor was transported using unknown cars and with civilian-dressed bodyguards.

Preceded by Abdul Karim Brahui	Governor of Nimruz Province; 2005 - 2010	Succeeded by Abdul Karim Brahui
