= Sharafat Kuh Front =

Afghan Mujahideen group

The Sharafat Kuh Front (Pashto: د شرافت کوه جبهه) was an Afghan mujahideen group active in the 1980s in Farah Province. It was led by Mulawi Mohammad Shah, an Achakzai Pashtun.

The group was named after the Sharafat Kuh, a large mountain southeast of the city of Farah which served as a mujahideen stronghold.
