= Abdul Karim Barahavi =

Governor of Nimroz, Afghanistan

- عبدالکریم براهویی
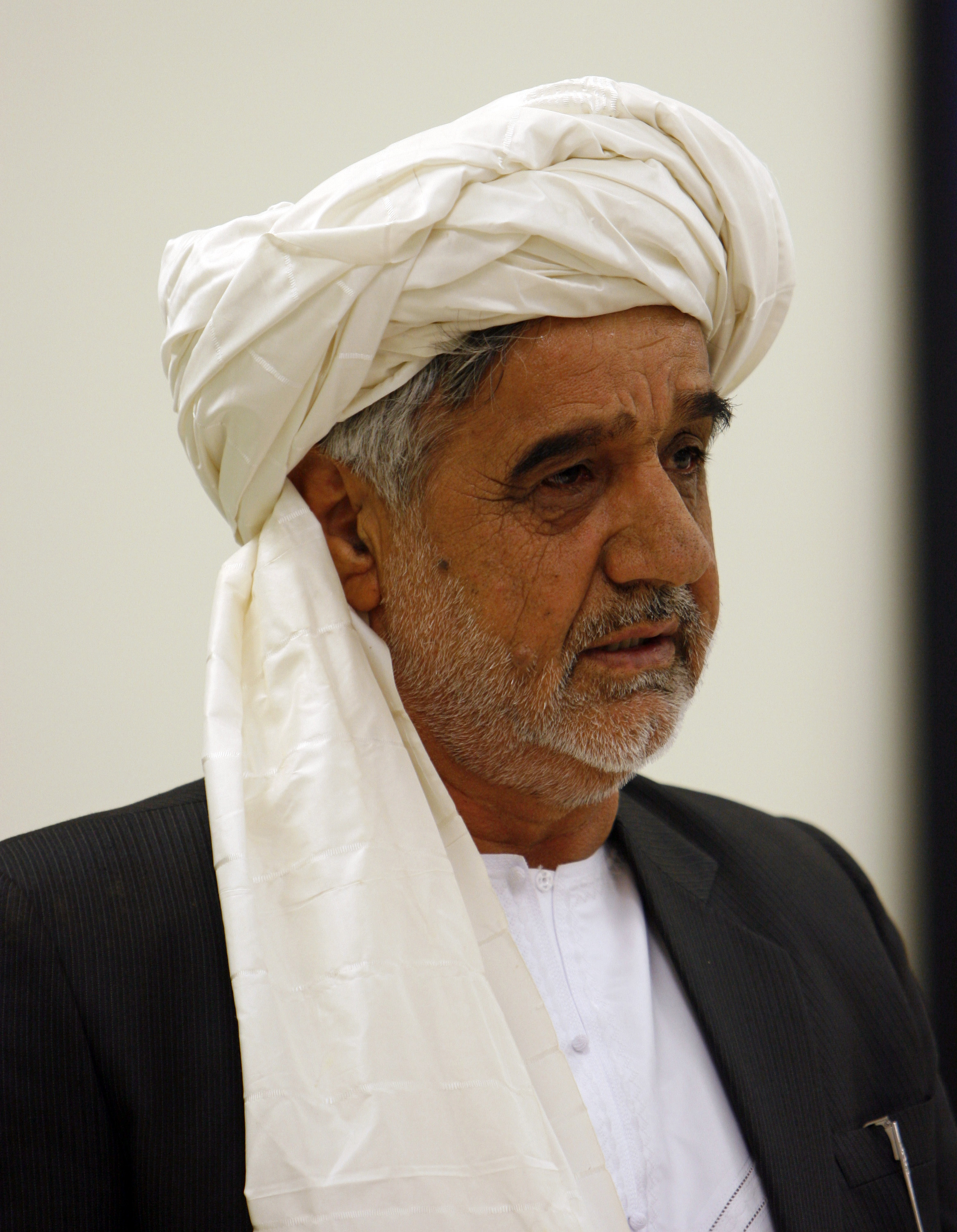
- Barahavi in 2011

Governor of Nimruz
- In office 24 August 2010 – 19 September 2012
- Preceded by: Ghulam Dastagir Azad
- Succeeded by: Amir Muhammad Akhundzada
- In office 2001–2005
- Preceded by: Muhammad Rasul
- Succeeded by: Ghulam Dastagir Azad

Minister for Refugees
- In office February 2009 – 24 August 2010
- Succeeded by: Jamahir Anwari

Minister of Borders and Tribal Affairs
- In office January 2005 – February 2009

Personal details
- Born: February 15, 1955 (age 71) Chahar Burjak District, Nimruz Province, Kingdom of Afghanistan
- Occupation: Politician, former Mujahideen leader

Abdul Karim Barahavi (Note: Dari: عبدالکریم براهویی) (born 15 February 1955) is an Afghan former politician. He served as Governor of Nimruz Province from 2010 to 2012. Prior to that, he served as a minister in the Cabinet of Afghanistan. From February 2009 to August 2010, Barahavi served as Minister of Refugees. In 2004, Barahavi was appointed as Minister of Borders and Tribal Affairs.

Born into an Baloch family in Nimruz provinceBarahavi joined the mujahideen alliance during the Soviet invasion of Afghanistan. He was the co-founder and leader of the Partisans of National Liberation of Afghanistan (PNLA) and afterwards, served in the cabinet of Burhanuddin Rabbani under the Islamic State of Afghanistan. Barahavi fled to the Balochistan province of Iran following the Taliban's takeover of Nimruz in 1995.

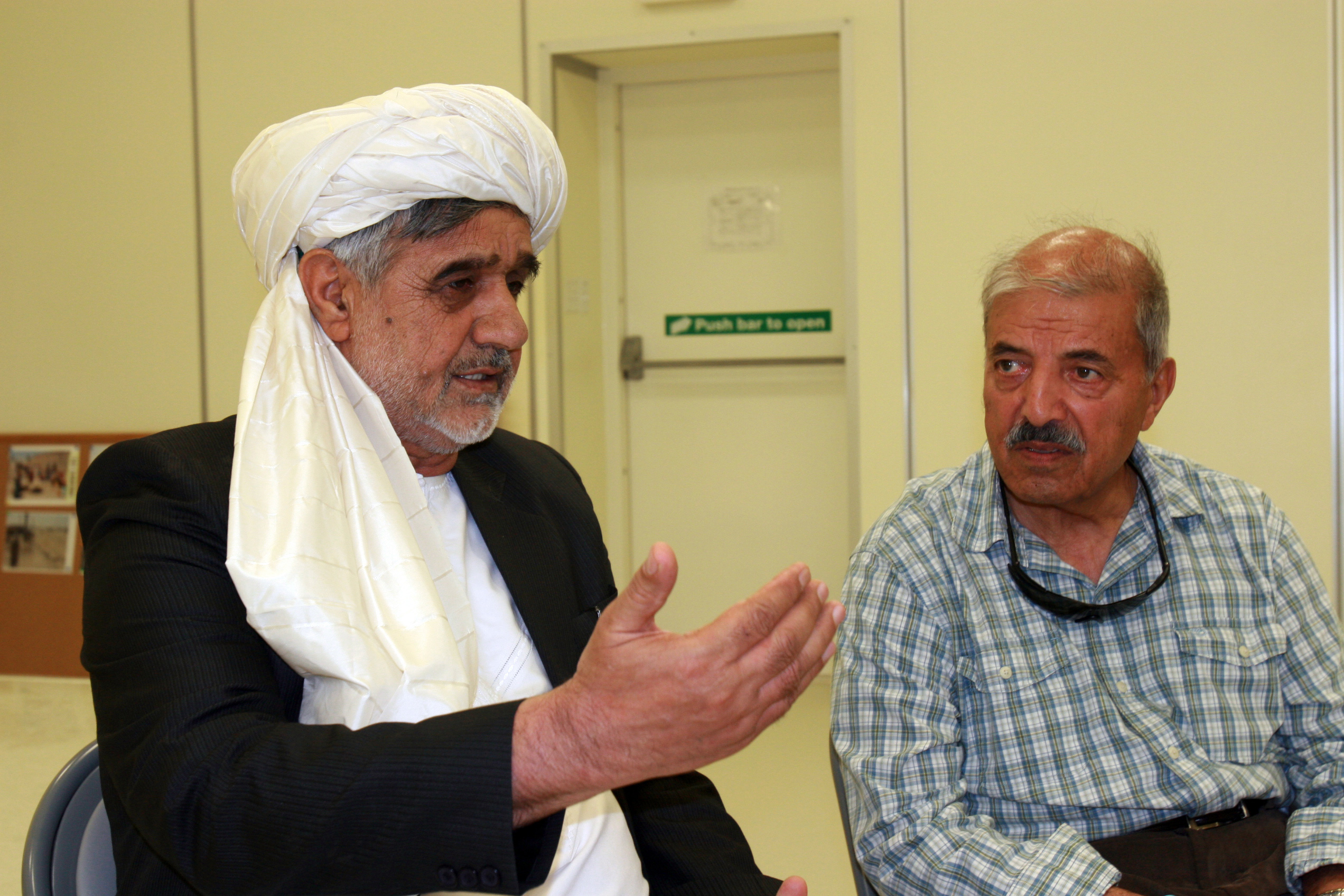
Barahavi in 2011

After the Taliban was toppled in 2001, Barahavi again served as governor of Nimruz and became the leading Baloch anti-Taliban figure. He survived an assassination attempt in 2009. Following the Taliban takeover of Afghanistan, Barahavi was reported to have fled to neighboring Iran.

== Early years ==
Barahavi was born in the Pedehgee village of Chahar Burjak District of Nimruz Province in 1955 to an ethnic Baloch family. He is the son of Mohammad Mobin.

He attended primary school in his hometown and graduated from Cadet School in 1973. He then attended Cadet College where he obtained his bachelor's degree in 1977 in the field of Weapons Technology and served in the military of Afghanistan. After the Soviet invasion of Afghanistan, he left the military as many others did and joined the mujahideen alliance.

== Mujahideen commander and politician ==
During the 1980s he was a mujahideen commander leading the Partisans of National Liberation of Afghanistan (PNLA).

Following the collapse of Najibullah's government, Barahavi was appointed as Governor of Nimruz and the Commander of the 4th Brigade in the government of Burhanuddin Rabbani.

When the Taliban under Mullah Omar took control of Nimruz in 1995, Barahavi and his troops fled to neighboring Baluchistan Province of Iran. At that point Hamidullah Niyazmand became governor of the province. During the Afghan Interim Administration, Barahavi was again appointed as the Governor of Nimruz and Commander of 4th Brigade.

In early 2009, militants attempted to kill Barahavi in a suicide attack. In early 2011, Barahavi again escaped unhurt in a remote-controlled bomb explosion. He was visiting an irrigation project on the Lashkari canal when his vehicle was hit with a remote control mine in the 2nd district of Zaranj, near the Darul Ulam Madrasa (Islamic school) in the city.

== Governor of Nimroz province ==
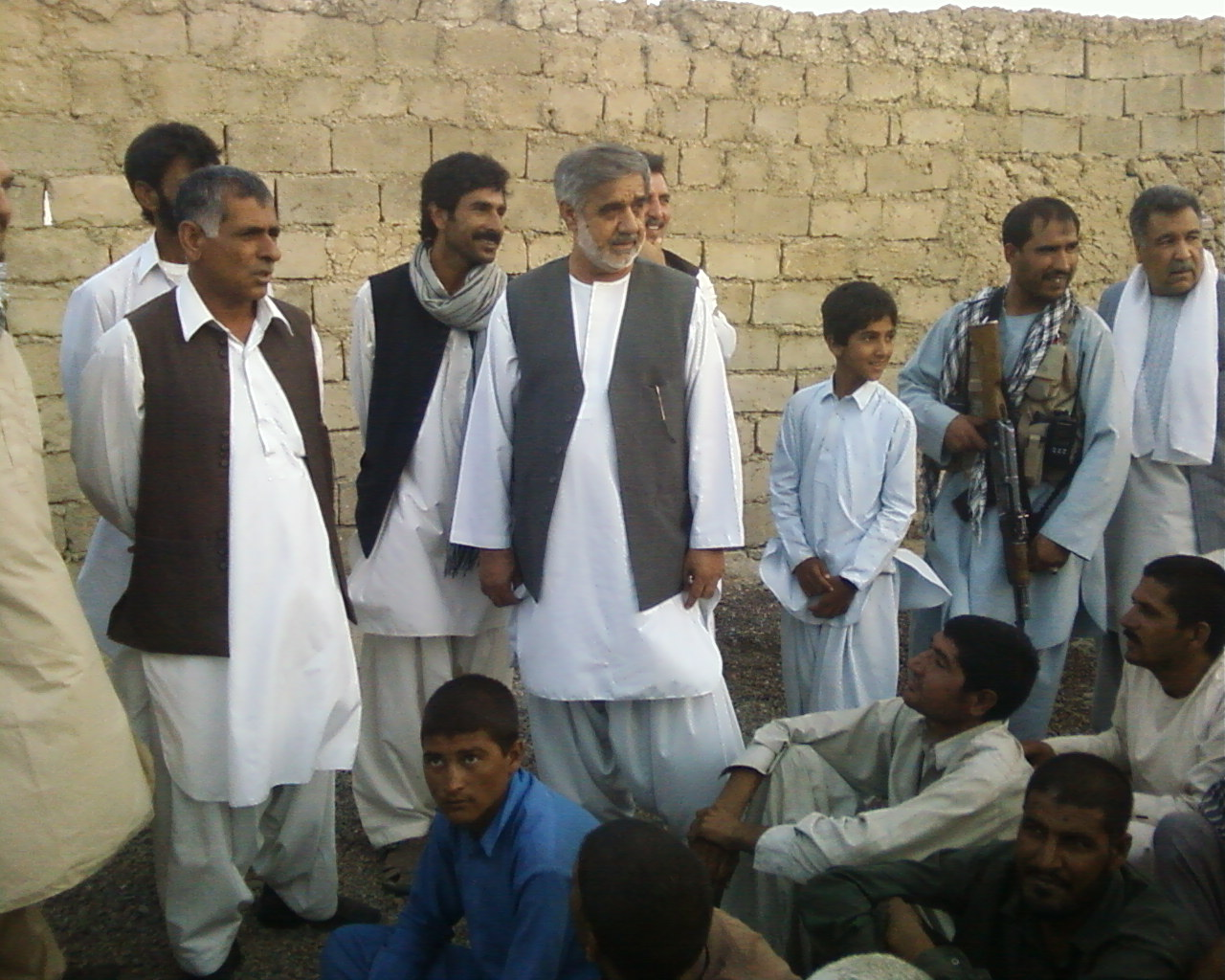
Abdul Karim Barahavi and Abdul Khaliq Karimi visiting the addiction treatment camp

Barahavi is the oldest governor in Nimroz province who has served in this position for four terms. Commencement of Kamal Khan dam, electricity supply to Zaranj city from Iran, creation of a new town in Chakhansur district, security of Zaranj-Delaram highway, reconstruction of Lashkari irrigation channel (supplying agricultural water to Zaranj and Kang), creation of de-addiction camp (free) for patients Narcotics is one of the important tasks of Barahavi during his tenure as the governor of Nimroz.

== Notes ==
Preceded by Ghulam Dastagir Azad	Governor of Nimroz Province; August 24, 2010 – September 19, 2012	Succeeded by Amir Muhammad Akhundzada
