= Chakhansur =

Chakhansur may refer to:

- Chakhansur District, a district in Nimroz Province, Afghanistan
- Chakhansur (village), a village and the center of the above district in Nimroz Province, Afghanistan
