= Farokhi High School =

Location
- Plan 5, District 1, Zaranj; Afghanistan
- Coordinates: 30°57′17″N 61°51′29″E

Information
- Type: High school
- Opened: yes
- Teaching staff: 24 teachers (Male)
- Enrollment: 1,409

Farokhi High School (Dari: لیسه عالی فرخی), also called Farokhi Sistani High School, is a school in Nimroz province, Afghanistan which has educated many of the former and current politicians and famous people of Nimroz, including former governor of Nimroz Khodainazar Sarmachar and others.

Per MoE Afghanistan report, there are 1,409 secondary and undergraduate students studying.

== Notable alumni ==
- Khodainazar Sarmachar, former governor of Nimroz
- Abdul Ghafor Zori, was a candidate in Afghanistan's 2009 Presidential elections

== See also ==
- List of schools in Zaranj
- List of schools in Nimroz
