= Dah Marda =

Balochi tribe

The Dah Marda or Dah Mardah or Dahmarda (Balochi: دهمردگ , Persian: دهمرده), is a tribe of Baloch people who live in Afghanistan and Iran.

In Afghanistan the tribe's primary residence was the Nizar in the Kang District, and in the Zaranj city and Chahar Burjak districts they villages with name of Dahmarda.

The most of Dah Marda tribe speak the Rakhshani dialect of the Balochi language, but Persian and Pashto languages are also spoken.
