= Sanjrani Chiefdom =

Baloch chiefdom

- 1820–1882
- Capital: Chakhansur
- Common languages: Balochi, Persian(administration)
- Religion: Islam
- Government: Confederation
- History
  - Established: 1820
  - Disestablished: 1882

Sanjrani was a Baloch chiefdom, ruled by the Sanjranis family who ruled Seistan in the 19th century.Ibrahim Khan Sanjrani Fort is reported to belong to the chiefdom.

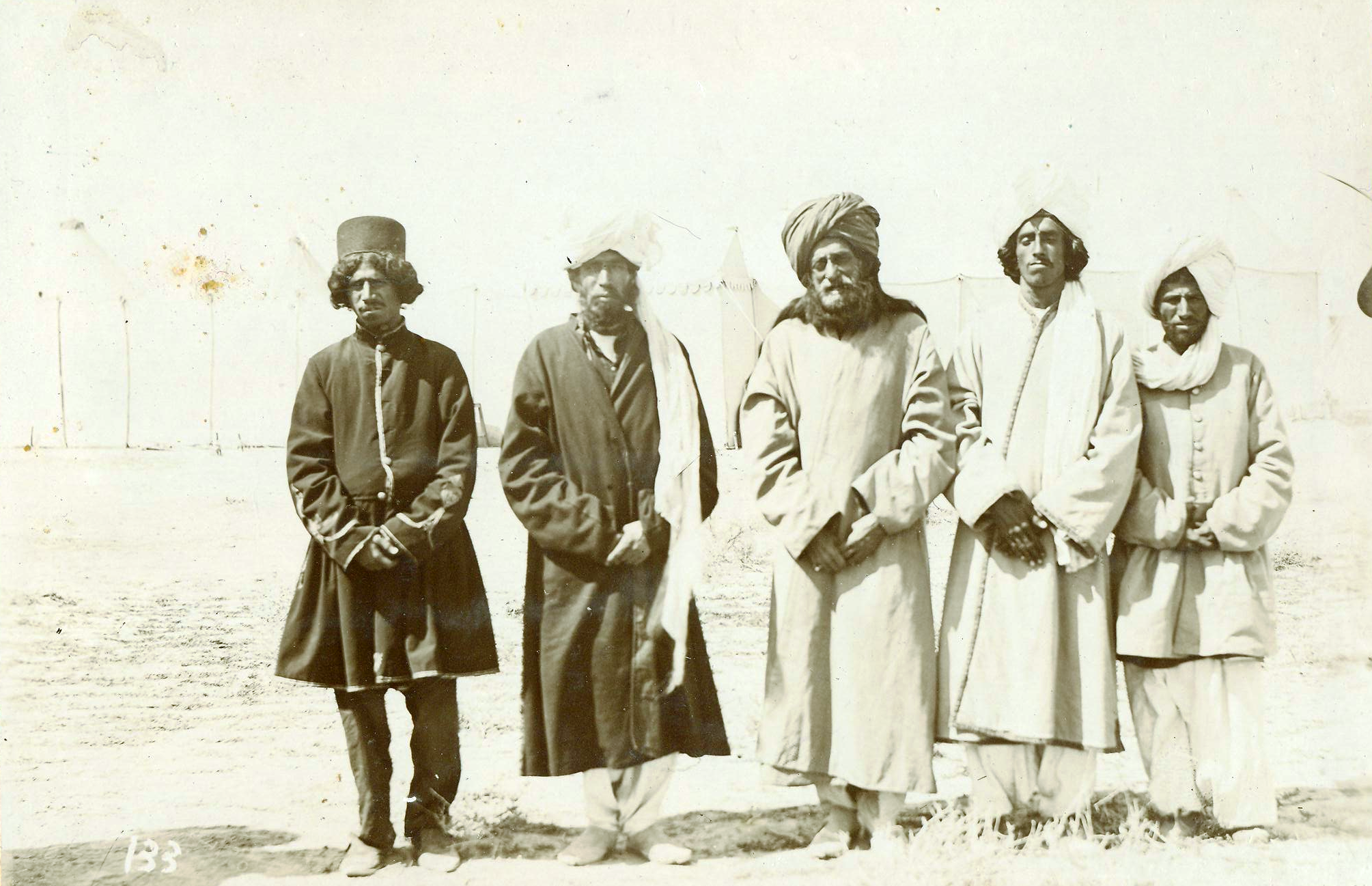
Ibragim Khan SanjraniI

== Background ==
Baloch tribal confederacy refers to a political arrangement in which several tribes coordinate under a shared leadership or a unifying principle, often one that claims common origin.

The Narui and Sanjarani are two Baloch tribes that formed part of a Baloch tribal confederation which, during the nineteenth century, controlled significant portions of the Sistan region.

== History ==
=== Foundation of the confederacy ===
Following the demarcation of the Goldsmid Line, a confederation of Baloch tribes emerged under the leadership of Sardar Ibrahim Khan Sanjarani and Sardar Sharif Nahrui, son of Sardar Alam Khan.

=== Territory ===
In the early nineteenth century, the Sanjrani branch of the Baloch established their main stronghold in Chakhansur, a settlement that had earlier served as the seat of baloch mirs.

The Sanjarani and Narui Baloch tribes rose to power in Sistan, Chakhansur and the banks of the Helmand where they exercised autonomous authority and governed these regions independently

=== Administration ===
Their chief, gradually consolidated his authority and secured full independence, eventually passing a stable domain to sherif Khan baloch, who became one of the most influential figures in the region.

Khan Jan Sanjrani focused on securing his autonomy. after his dead, Ali Khan took the power. His rule was short lived, he died in 1840 after a severe illness.

Malik Jalal‑ud‑Din, son of Malik Bahram Khan, married into the family of Ibrahim Khan Sanjarani, the chief of Chakhansur. By 1839, the Kianian Maliks of Sistan had lost their authority, regional power was divided among the leading Baloch tribal groups, Sanjaranis, Nahruis. Ibrahim Khan Sanjarani resisted Qajar authority in the Sistan region during the nineteenth century. For several years, he opposed attempts by the Persian governor of Qaen to impose direct control over the area, mobilizing tribal forces and maintaining a largely independent local administration. His resistance led to a series of clashes with Qajar forces stationed in Sistan as the central government sought to reassert its authority over the region.

During the late Qajar period, to strengthen his position and secure Baloch support, Amir Alam Khan, the governor of Qaen married a daughter of Sardar Ibrahim Khan Baloch, his son Ali Akbar Khan married into the Narui family, and another son, Mohammad Esmail Khan, married a daughter of Sardar Ahmad Khan Baloch, linked with the ruling house of Herat.

After the Goldsmid Line fixed the boundary between Iran and Afghanistan, two major leaders Sardar Ibrahim Khan Sanjarani of Chakhansur and Sardar Sharif Nahrui, son of Sardar Alam Khan mobilized a broad coalition of Baloch tribes. Their united front pushed back both Iranian and Afghan officials who attempted to assert control over the region.

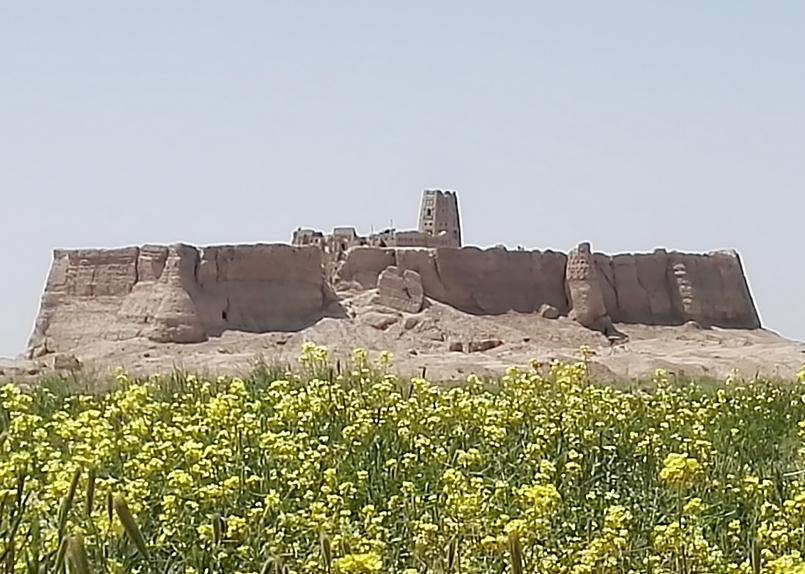
Ibrahim Khan Sanjrani Fort

Ibrahim Khan, the Sanjarani Baloch leader, maintained de facto independence in the Chakhansur region until 1882, when the authority of the Afghan central government was extended into the area. During a confrontation in 1299/1882 between Ibrahim Khan Sanjarani and Amir Abdur Rahman Khan, He defeated, after which the territory came under the control of the Afghan administration based in Farah.

Kamal Khan, the son of Ibrahim Khan Sanjarani, emerged in 1251 AH (1835–1836 CE) as the leading chief of the Sanjarani Baloch settled around Kamal Khan Dam Khan and as the principal Sanjarani commander in the Chahar Burjak district.

Near the place where the Helmand River leaves its confined upper channel, the waterway divides into two branches across an elevated tract overlooking the modern Sistan basin. On this higher ground stand the remains of a fort traditionally linked to Kamal Khan, a leader of the Sanjarani Baloch. Historically, the site served as a stopping point for caravans arriving from Makran and the frontier districts on their way to Sistan, where pastoral goods were exchanged for grain and other agricultural products. Owing to its role as a regional trading station, the settlement became known as Bandare Kamal Khan, a name that has continued into modern times.

== Rulers ==
- Khan Jan Sanjrani
- Ali Khan Sanjrani
- Sharif Khan Narui
- Ibrahim Khan Sanjrani
- Kamal Khan Sanjrani

== See also ==
- Sanjrani
- Ibrahim Khan Sanjrani Fort
