= Amanullah Zadran =

Amanullah Khan Zadran is a citizen of Afghanistan who has held several prominent positions of power.

Amanullah was a Taliban leader, who defected after the American invasion, and was appointed to cabinet as Minister of Tribal and Border Affairs by Afghan President Hamid Karzai in December 2001.

Amanullah's older brother, Pacha Khan Zadran, whose forces had always resisted the Taliban, had been briefly appointed the Governor of Paktia in December 2001, had fought with other tribal militia leaders, had been replaced by a newly appointed governor, and had refused to willingly surrender power.
