= Farah Airport =

Military airbase in Farah, Afghanistan

Farah Airport د فراه هوائی ډګر
- IATA: FAH; ICAO: OAFR

Summary
- Airport type: Public
- Owner: Afghanistan
- Operator: Ministry of Transport and Civil Aviation
- Serves: Farah Province
- Location: Farah, Afghanistan
- Elevation AMSL: 2,212 ft (674 m)
- Coordinates: 32°21′49.2″N 62°10′03″E

Map
- Location of airport in Afghanistan

Runways
Direction	Length		Surface
Direction	m	ft	Surface
15/33	3,000	6,024	asphalt
- Source: SkyVector.com, AIP Afghanistan

Farah Airport (Pashto: د فراه هوايي ډګر) (IATA: FAH, ICAO: OAFR) is located in the city of Farah in western Afghanistan, which is the capital of Farah Province. The airport is under the Afghan Ministry of Transport and Civil Aviation, and serves the population of southwestern Afghanistan.

Farah Airport has been providing domestic flight services to several cities in the country, and had been considered for international flights. Qatar was working with local authorities to upgrade Farah Airport for international flights in the late 2010s.

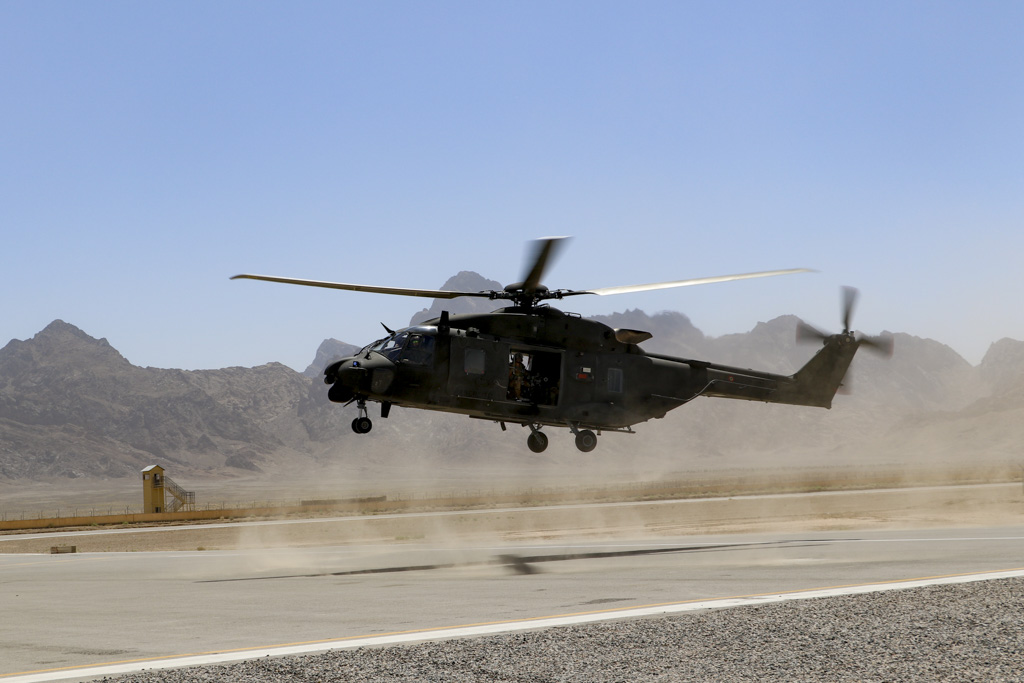
An Italian Army NH90 landing at Farah Air Base, Afghanistan, 2019

Farah Airport was also used for military purposes in the past by the United States Armed Forces, the International Security Assistance Force (ISAF), and the old Afghan Air Force (AAF). It was renovated and expanded in the 2010s.

Under a 10-year agreement signed in 2022, the Taliban handed over running of Afghanistan's airports to the United Arab Emirates firm GAAC Holding.

After the Taliban's conquest of Afghanistan in August 2021, all commercial flights were halted at Farah Airport. There has been a push since 2023 to re-establish flights to Kabul. It is known the airport has taken flights from the Red Crescent aid organization and has airport security.

== Former airlines and destinations ==
Airlines	Destinations
East Horizon Airlines	Herat
Kam Air	Herat, Kabul

== See also ==
- List of airports in Afghanistan
