= Gul Zarin =

Taliban politician

Maulvi Gul Zarin Kochi ګل زرین کوچی

Deputy Minister of Borders and Tribal Affairs
- Incumbent
- Assumed office 23 November 2021 (Note: Acting: 23 November 2021 – 15 August 2025) Serving with Haji Gul Mohammad; Ahmad Taha
- Prime Minister: Mohammad Hassan Akhund
- Supreme Leader: Hibatullah Akhundzada

Personal details
- Party: Taliban
- Occupation: Politician, Taliban member

Maulvi Gul Zarin Kochi (Pashto: مولوی ګل زرین کوچی) is an Afghan Taliban politician who is serving as Deputy Ministry of Borders and Tribal Affairs since 23 November 2021 alongside Haji Gul Mohammad and Ahmad Taha. He is also serving as the director of the Independent General Directorate of Kochi (nomad).
