= 2013 Farah attack =

Taliban attack in Farah, Afghanistan

On 3 April 2013, the Taliban attacked Farah, Afghanistan, using bombs and guns.

== Attack ==
On 3 April 2013, a group of militants began an assault on Farah, a city in western Afghanistan. The attack began at about 9am and centred on the city's courthouse. Nine suicide attackers disguised as Afghan army soldiers blew up an army vehicle, damaging buildings - including the local governor's office and two banks. They entered buildings, then a machine-gun and grenade battle ensued between the attackers and Afghan security forces. Six attackers wore explosive belts.

=== Fatalities and injuries ===
The death toll was at least 44 peoples including 10 police officers and soldiers. Over 100 people, most of whom were civilians, were injured. The nine attackers all died.

The attack has been described as the deadliest attack in Afghanistan in almost 2 years.

== Reaction ==
The Taliban said they carried out the attack and that they succeeded in freeing their prisoners. However, the province's police chief said that the insurgents failed in their attempt to enable the escape of 15 Taliban prisoners who were being transferred to the courthouse to be tried, as they are all accounted for.

Qari Yousuf Ahmadi, a spokesman for the Taliban, insists civilians were not killed. He said the Taliban do not consider attorneys and judges to be civilians but rather agents of the Kabul regime, and therefore legitimate targets. Ahmadi said “We besieged all the rooms and shot them in the head one by one.”

President Hamid Karzai said in a statement, “Terrorists once again have shed the blood of innocent people visiting government departments for their work. Terrorists should know that they must answer for this before the nation and that they will face the God’s punishment in the afterlife.”
