= Farah District =

- District
- Interactive map of Farah District
- Country: Afghanistan
- Province: Farah

Population
  - Total: 54,000
- Time zone: UTC+4:30 (D† (Afghanistan Standard Time))

Farah City District (Pashto: د فراه ښار ولسوالۍ) is a district in Farah province, Afghanistan, containing the main city of Farah.The city of Farah has a population of 54,000 (in 2015). it has 6 districts and a total land area of 2,949 Hectares. The total number of dwellings in this city are 5,299.

== Popular perceptions ==
As of mid-2009, life seems normal among the district. The streets are full of children and adults alike, who wave at the military vehicles in a friendly manner as they pass by, with the exception of a few who silently glared in their direction. Those few individuals who give them negative looks only do so because they may feel intimidated by the large vehicles and crew-served weapons mounted on them. "Most change their attitudes when we get out of the vehicles," Smith said. "They see us face to face and see that we're people just like them. They realize we're there to help," says Army Staff Sergeant. John Smith, an infantryman who provides security for Provincial Reconstruction Team-Farah.

== Population ==
The population of the urban area of Farah province, the capital consists of Tajik, Pashtun and Baluchis/Brahuis.

== Security ==
=== 2008 ===
The head of a Farah district returned to his post after fleeing the area last autumn in 2007 when 400 Taliban fighters swarmed the district and killed six civilians and a police officer. The International Security Assistance Forces said that Haji Qasim, the head of the province's Gulistan District, was able to return to his post because "security in the province has improved". The province's governor, Mawlawi Mohideen Baluch, told a shura of 40 elders and government officials: "To improve security in this district, you must join together in solidarity. "Do not allow the enemies of Afghanistan to stay in your homes or in your villages. You must stand up to them. Security forces cannot protect you without your assistance." Security is better than 2007 because the district has a new police chief and "an experienced and respected district manager", Baluch said.

=== 2007 ===
Taliban captured Farah district in western Afghanistan forcing lightly armed Afghan police to flee and defying Afghan and foreign forces to retake the lost ground. First, Taliban rebels captured the Farah district of Gulistan a week ago, then on Wednesday took nearby Bakwa. The insurgents also seized Khak-e Sefid without a fight. "Khake-e Sefid district fell into Taliban hands without any resistance from Afghan forces," Qadir Daqiq, a Farah provincial council member at the time told Reuters. Taliban forces had been building up around Khak-e Sefid for some days. The rebels in Farah have been receiving arms through a Taliban leader based close to the Iranian border. "There are many Iranians and Pakistanis fighting among the Afghan Taliban," then Farah provincial police chief Abdulrahman Sarjang told Reuters.

== Education ==
Farah District contains the Agricultural and Veterinary Educational Institute, which was funded by the Afghan government and the United States, with the cooperation of the people of Farah.

== Agriculture ==
=== Opium ===
Poppy has taken precedence as the number one crop grown in Farah province with cultivation doubling between 2006 (7694 hectares) and 2007 (14,865 hectares). Bakwa and Farah districts make up the bulk of critical poppy growing areas.
