= List of schools in Zaranj =

The following is a list of schools in Zaranj, the capital of Nimroz province, Afghanistan. It includes primary and high schools. Zaranj has 47 public primary, secondary and high schools. Some are schools for boys only while others are strictly for girls. All schools in Afghanistan are run by the Ministry of Education and free to the public although some private ones may charge fees.

== High schools ==
- Farokhi High School
- Shaheed Gul Mohammad High School
- Naswan Zaranj High School
- Maliki High School
- Dahmarda High School
- Abdul Rahman Lala High School
- Qala-e Mohammad High School
- Shaheed Naheed High School
- Kang Din Mohammad High School
- Seya Cham High School
- Qader Khan High School
- Sistan High School
- Estiqlal High School
- Rodaba High School
- Shaheed Habib High School
- Malali High School, Nimroz
- Gul Maki High School

== Secondary schools ==
- Yaqub Les Secondary School
- Noor Ahmad Azizi Secondary School
- Shoro Secondary School
- Khuja Abdul Rahman Secondary School
- Mohammad Alam Secondary School
- Zokur Zaranj Secondary School
- Abdul Rahman Pahwal Secondary School
- Ayub Zaheer Secondary School
- Kherudin Ghamai Secondary School
- Mohammad Hosain Khan Secondary School
- Ghulam Hedar Khazaye Secondary School

== Primary schools ==
- Mowlana Primary School
- Nok Jow Primary School
- Faiz Mohammad Primary School
- Shaheed Gul Mohammad Primary School
- Kordu Primary School
- Seya Dek Primary School
- Dasht Bati Primary School
- Akhtar Mohammad Primary School
- Lal Khan Primary School
- Atiqullah Primary School
- Farokhi Primary School
- Jamaludin Arab Primary School
- Abdul Wahid Hekmat Primary School
- Neamatullah Primary School

== Inactive schools ==
- Halim Khan Primary School
- Feruzagi Primary School
- Abdul Satar Primary School
- Baynaz Primary School
- Khwabga Primary School

== See also ==
- Education in Afghanistan
- List of schools in Afghanistan
