= Battle of Farah =

Battle of Senkaya (1916)

- Part of the Afghan War
- Location of Farah, Afghanistan
Date	14–16 May 2018
Location	Farah, Farah Province, Afghanistan 32°20′37″N 62°7′10″E
Result	Afghan government victory and recapture of Farah

Belligerents
Islamic Republic of Afghanistan; Supported by: Resolute Support Mission: United States	(Afghanistan) Taliban

Commanders and leaders
(Islamic Republic of Afghanistan) Ashraf Ghani (President of Afghanistan)	(Afghanistan) Hibatullah Akhundzada (Supreme Commander)

Strength
	Hundreds

Casualties and losses
25 killed 63 killed (Taliban claim)	300 killed 9 killed, 11 injured (Taliban claim)
- 5 civilians killed

The Battle of Farah began on 14 May 2018, when Taliban fighters launched an assault on the city of Farah, located in western Afghanistan.

== Background ==
In the months prior to the assault on the city itself, the Taliban had captured much of Afghanistan's Farah province, with fighting intensifying as a result of the group's Al Khandaq spring offensive, named after the Battle of the Trench in which the Islamic prophet Muhammad led a decisive Muslim victory against Arab and Jewish tribes.

== Battle ==
The Taliban began its assault on the city on 14 May 2018, using captured Humvees and Afghan police trucks to attack and overrun checkpoints and government buildings in Farah. Spokesman Zabiullah Mujahid released photos of Taliban fighters in the city's central square, indicating Taliban control of Farah. Reports surfaced of the Taliban freeing hundreds of prisoners from Farah Prison. The Afghan government swiftly responded by sending reinforcements to the city. Afghan Airforce helicopters and American A-10 Warthog attack aircraft launched airstrikes on Taliban positions in Farah.

On 16 May, government security forces backed by U.S. air support reasserted control over Farah after driving the Taliban out of the city center. The security forces then conducted a clearing operation. Abdul Basir Salangi, governor of Farah province, said that the clashes left at least 25 members of the government security forces and five civilians dead, and at least 300 Taliban fighters were also killed.
