= Rouh Gul Khairzad =

Afghan politician (born 1974)

Rouh Gul Khairzad (born 1974 in Kang District, Nimruz Province) is an Afghan politician and senator of the Meshrano Jirga. A teacher for 28 years, Khairzad was elected to the Meshrano Jirga in 2010 from the area of Nimroz, and is one of a number of female elected politicians in Afghanistan. She is the head of the Meshrano Jirga's defense and internal security commission.

In August 2013, Khairzad and her husband survived a Taliban ambush on a highway in Ghazni Province which killed her eight-year-old daughter as well as her driver; Khairzad, who was on the way from Kabul to her home province of Nimruz to celebrate Eid al-Fitr, was shot and wounded in the assassination attempt. The United Nations condemned the attack.
