= Khodainazar Sarmachar =

Khodainazar Sarmachar (Balochi: خداینظر سرمچار), was born 1955 in Nimruz Province and has a B.A. He was a member of the Committee on Health and Physical Education and International Relations Committee in Wolesi Jirga or Parliament of Afghanistan in 2005. He is a former Governor of Nimruz

== Early years ==
Khodai nazar Sarmachar was born 1955 in Chekhansur, Nimruz Province. He graduated in 1975 from the Farokhi High School in Nimroz. Sarmachar graduated in 1981 from Faculty of Veterinary Medicine from the Kabul University in Kabul.
