= Lor Koh =

Mountain in Afghanistan

Coordinates: 32°28′N 62°40′E

Lor Koh is a 2,492 metres high mountain, southeast of the city of Farah in western Afghanistan.

The mountain was renamed Sharafat Koh (Honor Mountain) by the Afghan mujahideen after they established a stronghold there in 1979. The Afghan communists referred to the mountain as Mordar Koh (Filthy Mountain).

== Capturing Lor Koh ==
A series of military operations by Soviet troops and the Armed Forces of the DRA to capture the base area of the Afghan mujahideen during the Afghan war (1979-1989), in the Lor Koh mountain range in the southwestern part of the Republic of Afghanistan in the Farah province.

== Preceding events ==
Detachments of Afghan mujahideen from the Lor Koh region carried out regular attacks on the highway and methodically increased their territory under their control. Various attempts were made by the command of the Soviet troops and the Afghan army to squeeze the rebel groups out of the gorge and leave the area. In 1980, the command of the Soviet 5th Infantry Division decided to eliminate the rebel detachment in the gorge and seize the Lor Koh base area.

== Purpose and course of the operation ==
According to General B.V. Gromov, the commander of the Soviet contingent in Afghanistan, the capture of the Lor Koh base was, first of all, needed by the Government forces of the DRA, and not by the 40th Army of the USSR. On the border of Afghanistan and Iran, the 5th motorized rifle division conducted combat activities. Its area of responsibility was the entire territory bordering with Iran - the provinces of Herat, Farah, Helmand. At the stage of the beginning of the military operation, it was proposed to mine all the entrances and exits to the gorge, enclosing the rebels in a so-called bag, and keeping them in the zone of constant destruction of Soviet artillery and aviation. The command of the Afghan army had a different opinion: they offered to make a powerful breakthrough deep into the gorge and destroy the base, while sending Soviet troops forward. From the very beginning, the course of the operation to capture Lor Koh took on a complex character - attempts to advance into the depths of the mountain range met with fierce resistance from the rebels. The base was equipped and replenished with reserves in advance and with a prospect for the future: huge stocks of ammunition and food allowed the rebels to hold out for a long time. To capture Lor Koh, first of all, it was necessary to clear all the approaches to the base and suppress the firing points that targeted the sections of the gorge. It was extremely difficult to do this without loss. The advance along the mountain ranges in the direction of the base area, for the consistent capture of the dominant heights, was prevented by the oncoming heavy enemy fire.

The landing of a Soviet landing in the Lor Koh area, due to the numerical and positional advantage in favor of the rebels, was inexpedient. The forces of Soviet artillery were not enough for preliminary processing by strikes on the slopes in order to exclude the loss of foot groups. At the current stage, the Soviet troops did not have the necessary number of helicopters and front-line aviation for the landing, and the aviation forces - air cover for helicopters - were also lacking. One of the main problems was also the lack of proper communication for controlling the landing in the mountains, especially when descending into the gorge. The loss of communication with the foot groups was tantamount to their death.

At the initial stage of the war, the Soviet troops were not yet equipped with aviation systems with radio repeaters, those that later hung in the air during each of the hostilities. If Soviet units imposed a battle on the rebels, it would lead to heavy casualties. Based on this, it was decided not to carry out an operation inside Lor Koh, but to limit itself only to the selected measures: the approaches to the mountain range were mined, the gorges were treated with artillery. Between the rocks of Lor Koh and the road, reinforced barriers were set up to intercept the rebels. It took five days, after which the divisions returned to the barracks. A few months later, the base in Lurkokh began to remind of itself again.

The base area was almost daily subjected to bomb-assault and long-range artillery strikes, mining of the main gorges and approaches to them was constantly repeated. Nevertheless, Lor Koh again began to be used by the opposition as a united command post - on a well-fortified base in the center of the mountains, where the leaders of the mujahideen formations continued to gather from time to time. The Soviet command was oppressed by the fact that during the incessant raids of the rebels, outposts, guard posts and military garrisons - parts of the 40th Army and government troops, continued to suffer losses.

To capture Lor Kokh, before the subunits set out, it was necessary to clear the areas of the gorge under fire. It was impossible to do this without losses from the Soviet side. The Soviet paratroopers could not move along the mountain ranges in order to occupy the dominant heights - they ran into a wall of heavy oncoming fire. The landing directly at Lor Koh was also not possible, since there was not enough force for this.

There was not enough artillery for the preliminary processing of the mountain slopes before the landing of the landing groups, thereby excluding the possibility of its defeat. There was not the required number of helicopters for landing and front-line aviation for cover. The most test task was to control the landing force that went into the mountains, and to a greater extent descended into the gorge - the loss of communication with the landing force is tantamount to its death.

Based on the current situation, the command of the operation decided not to send troops to Lor Kokh, but to limit themselves to only some measures - to carefully mine the approaches to the mountain range, and the tops of the mountains were thoroughly re-processed by artillery. Between the rocky passages of Lor Koh in the valleys, reinforced barriers were set up to intercept the Mujahideen. The operation ended at this point.

== Lor Koh after 1980, 1981 ==
A few months after the operations in Lor Koh, the base began to function again. Mujahideen in the area renewed their attacks on the highway and systematically increased the territory under their control. Soviet troops took all measures to squeeze the rebels out of the gorge. In the future, the attacks of the rebels on the Soviet and Afghan outposts, outposts, military garrisons of the unit did not stop, taking on a regular character, and led to human casualties. The command of the 5th Infantry Division again faced the need to eliminate the rebel detachments and capture the base area of Lurkokh. Much later, Lurkokh again fell into the field of view of the command of the 40th Army, the rebel detachments operating in the Lor Kokh gorge became more active at the end of 1985, then a series of massive bomb and assault air strikes were carried out on them, after which Lurkokh no longer functioned.

The fighting to seize the Lor Koh Mujahideen base in December 1984 was carried out using sudden night strikes from different directions and further seizing all the main heights in the mountain range and establishing control over the main gorge, from which the secondary ones departed. Under the cover of artillery fire, it was possible to clear all the approaches, and then, suppressing the enemy with artillery fire and aviation strikes, the main forces were brought in. Suppressing enemy firing points and capturing prisoners. During the operation, three people were killed: one was killed by a sniper, the second was blown up by a rebel mine, the third fell off a cliff and crashed into a gorge during night operations to capture heights.

At the Lor Koh base, plots of cultivated land were discovered where everything from vegetables to wheat was grown; training fields, where fire training classes were held from various types of weapons from small arms to grenade launchers; classes in tactics, sapper business - the installation and removal of anti-personnel and anti-tank mines, land mines, charges. The base also had a prison. Each cell had chains and shackles. The front side of the cells was covered with a grill made of a thick metal rod, with a door in it. At the end of the prison there was a room with many different instruments of torture. There was a small guard tower over the prison. At the time of the capture of Lor Koh, none of the prisoners were found in the prison.

During the inspection, they also found barracks for a variable staff undergoing training here, behind them were premises where the permanent staff was located. The premises intended for the command and the foreign adviser were detached. Some rooms were mined with surprise mines. In one of the caves, a trophy warehouse was discovered, as well as a lot of foreign literature in English and French. There were also at the base, separate rooms for prayer; kitchen-dining room, built by a small flowing lake, feeding with the waters of powerful springs. From this lake stretched many kilometers of flexible colored rubber hoses, they went up to the rocks and into some caves. The availability of water provided the rebels with life. Upon completion of the operation and exit from the gorge, the base infrastructure was undermined and mined.

== More about Lor Koh base ==
From the description by the Afghan mujahideen: the actual name of the mountain range is Lor Koh, but the mujahideen themselves among themselves called it Sharafat Koh - the mountain of honor. Lor Koh is located southeast of the city of Farah, 12 kilometers from the Kandahar-Herat highway, and 20 kilometers from the Daulatabad-Farah highway. The mountain range is a strict rectangular shape on a plateau (top view). It rises up to 1500 meters above the surrounding desert, the mountain slopes of the massif are steep. Lor Koch covers over 256 square kilometers.

The massif consists of many connected large and small canyons. On the north side - Shaykh Razi Baba Canyon, in the north-west of the massif there is Kale-e Amani Canyon, in the west of the massif there is - Kale-e Kaneske Canyon Canyon). The Jare-e Ab Canyon faces southwest and joins the Kal-e-Kaneski Canyon at the top. In the south is the Tangira Canyon, the most water-bearing, but the Mujahideen usually did not use it in their tactics, since the canyon was the widest and most sufficient for the passage of enemy armored vehicles. In the south, and further in the east, there is the Khwaja Morad Canyon, located near the Khoja Morad temple. The Khoja-Morad canyon is connected with all the canyons of the mountain range.

The Kal-e Kaneske canyon was the most powerful base in Sharafat Koh. It takes 35–40 minutes to overcome the path from the entrance to the end of the gorge. The mouth of the canyon is a gorge in a solid rock, only two to three meters wide. At the entrance to the canyon, it is impossible to observe the sky above you, in the depths of the gorge - in the area where there are many trees, it expands three to four times. The canyon has 40-meter waterfalls flowing into a reservoir, water supply dams and 16 caves that can accommodate 60 people. On both sides, at the tops of the canyons, DShK machine guns were installed.

In connection with the loss of powerful bases in the vicinity of the provincial centers of Farah and Nimruz in the early years of the war as a result of the attacks of the Soviet and Afghan government forces, the Mujahideen decided to equip the Sharafat Koh base area. The first base at Sharafat Koh was set up in Tangir canyon in 1979. The Mujahideen detachments were organized along tribal lines, initially they were: Achakzai, Nurzai, Barakzai and Alizai. They united and moved to a new base in the Jare-e canyon. Soviet troops attacked this base in 1980, from there the Mujahideen moved to the Kal-e-Kaneski canyon. The Mujahideen were in the city of Farah until 1982.

When the DRA and Soviet troops cleared the area, the Mujahideen abandoned their positions and retreated to Sharafat Koh. With the abandonment of Farah, the Mujahideen lost contact with the population of the city. The Mujahideen regularly attacked nearby columns - Karvanga, Chara, Shivan, as well as garrisons: in Karwang, Charah and Velamekh, intended to escort the columns. The leader of the Mujahideen formations in Sharafat Koh was Maulawi Mohammad Shah from the Achakzai tribe.

== Literature ==
- Lester K. Grau, Ali Ahmad Jalali — «The Other Side Of The Mountain: Mujahideen Tactics In The Soviet-Afghan War»Lester K. Grau, Ali Ahmad Jalali — «The Other Side Of The Mountain: Mujahideen Tactics In The Soviet-Afghan War» & «Afghan Guerrilla Warfare: In the Words of the Mjuahideen Fighters»
- № 1 «AfghAn Insurgent tActIcs, technIques, And Procedures fIeld guIde»№ 2 «AfghAn Insurgent tActIcs, technIques, And Procedures fIeld guIde»
- «Vignette 5 Battles for Sharafat KohMountain Fortress by Engineer Mohammad Ibrahim», from: «The Other Side Of The Mountain: Mujahideen Tactics In The Soviet-Afghan War» by Lester K. Grau and Ali Ahmad Jalali
- «Vignette 12:Defending Base Camps Battles for Sharafat Koh Mountain Fortress 1982—1983»

== Soviet & Russian literature ==
- Борис Громов «Ограниченный контингент» «Луркох» c.29-31
- «Афганская война: 1979—1989» В. А. Богданов с.160
- генерал А. М. Табунщиков «Гибель генерала Хахалова в Афганистане. Провинция Фарах. 1981 год.»
- А. А. Ляховский «Трагедия и доблесть Афгана» с.511 о Овладении Луркох в 1984 году
- «Луркох» журнал Минобороны РФ «Армейский сборник» 2005 года
- Г. А. Стефановский в Книге «ПЛАМЯ ВОЙНЫ» генерал-полковник, член Военного совета, начальник политического управления ТуркВО Москва, 1993 Воениздат
- Г. А. Стефановский (Табунщиков) «Пламя афганской войны»«НЕ ДАЙ, ОТЧИЗНА, УМОЛЧАТЬ…» ЛЕНИНГРАДСКАЯ ОБЛАСТЬ «КНИГА ПАМЯТИ»
- Игорь Цыбульский Книга «Громов» с.38-39«ЛурКох»
- Виктор Марковский — полковник ВВС «Жаркое небо Афганистана»
- В. И. Варенников «НЕПОВТОРИМОЕ» С.62—63 О боевых действиях в Луркох в 1984 году
- «ЛУРКОХ» Книга «Война в Афганистане» (литература Минобороны СССР) с.257-258 коллектив авторов: кандидат исторических наук полковник Пиков Н. И. (руководитель); полковник Никитенко Е. Г.; кандидат философских наук подполковник Тегин Ю. Л.; подполковник Шведов Ю. Н.— М.: Воениздат, 1991. — 367 с: 10 л. ил. — Тираж 35 000 экз. — ISBN 5-203-01004-8.
- Академик Христофоров, Василий Степанович в крупнейшей монографии: «Афганистан. Правящая партия и Армия(1978—1989)».— М.: Граница, 2009 (рецензия )
- Белоусов Игорь Викторович, доктор исторических наук МПГУ
- Полынов, Матвей Фёдорович, доктор исторических наук, профессор кафедры «Новейшей истории России» в Институте истории, СПГУ
- В.Марковский «ЖАРКОЕ НЕБО АФГАНА. ЛУРКОХ»
