= Lash Wa Juwayn District =

Lash Wa Juwayn لاش جوین
- District
- Location within Afghanistan
- Coordinates: 31°49′34″N 61°13′48″E
- Country: Afghanistan
- Province: Farah

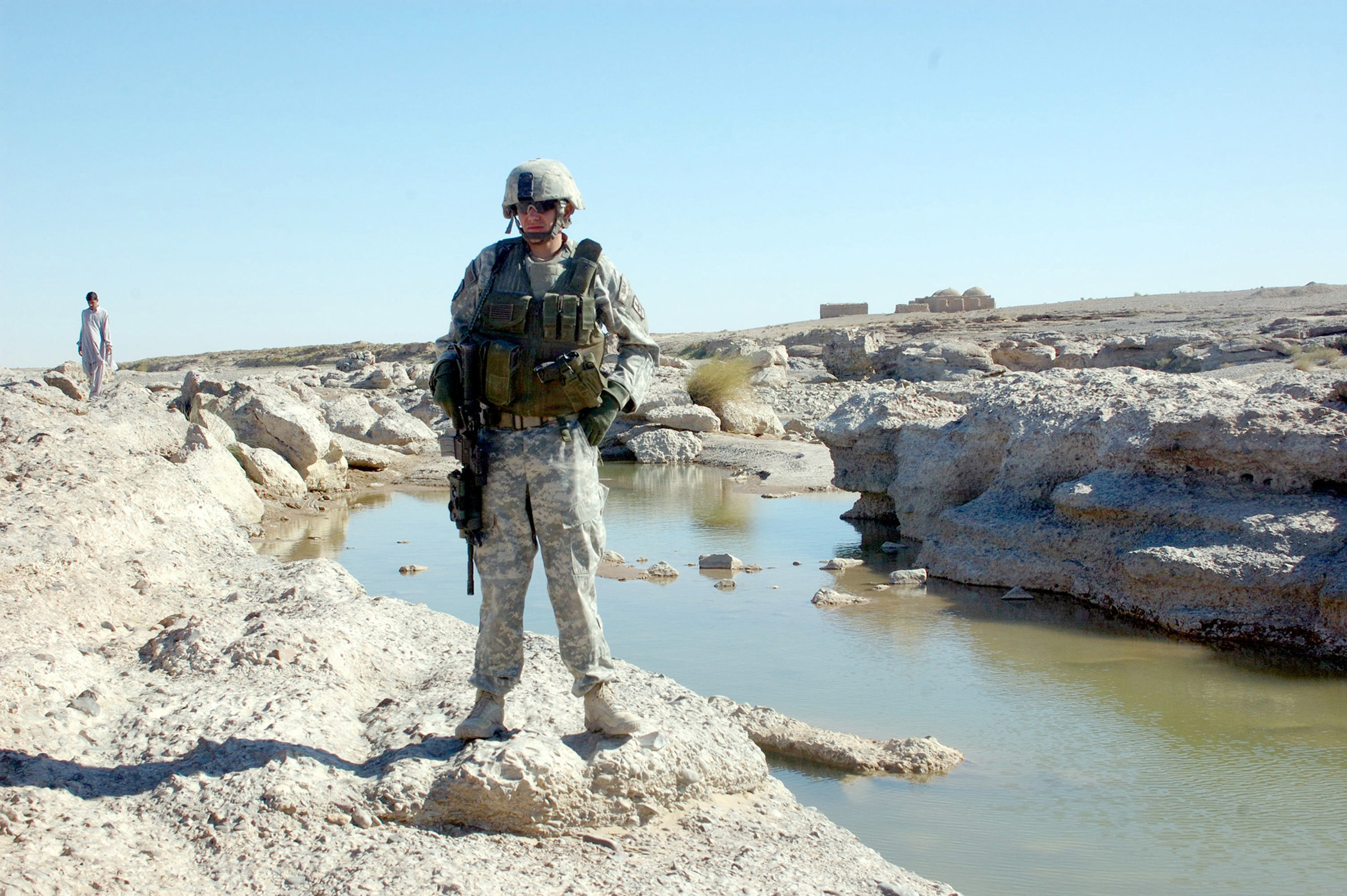
US military engineers survey a planned bridge in Tojg, Lash wa Juwayn district

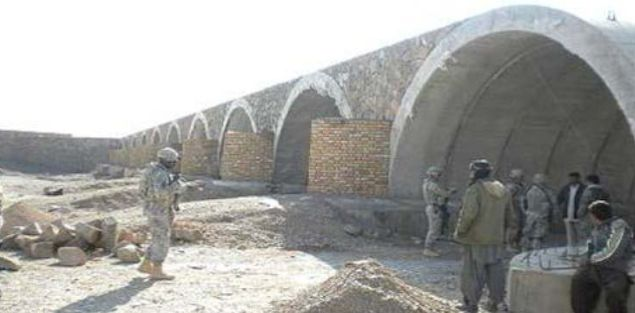
United States soldiers oversee construction of the Tojg Bridge in Afghanistan

Lash wa Juwayn (Pashto: لاش او جوین) (also transliterated Lash o Jawain) is a district in Farah Province, Afghanistan. The main town, also called Lash wa Juwayn, is situated at 508 m elevation by Daryache-ye Sistan lake.

== Populated places ==
- Tojg
