= Ministry of Borders and Tribal Affairs =

Government ministry of Afghanistan

Afghan Ministry of Borders and Tribal Affairs
- (Pashto: د سرحدونو او قبایلو چارو وزارت) (Dari: وزارت امور سرحدات، اقوام و قبایل)
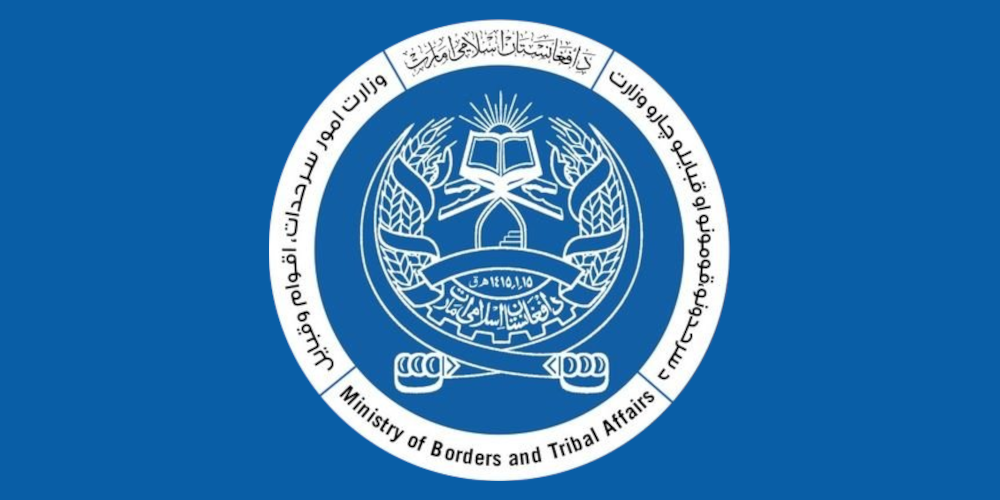
- Ministry flag

Agency overview
- Jurisdiction: Government of Afghanistan
- Headquarters: Kabul, Afghanistan; 34.538688°N 69.195313°E
- Minister responsible: Norullah Noori
- Deputy Ministers responsible: Haji Gul Mohammad; Gul Zarin; Maulvi Ahmad Taha
- Website: https://www.mobta.gov.af

The Ministry of Borders and Tribal Affairs (Pashto: د سرحدونو او قبایلو چارو وزارت), (Dari: وزارت امور سرحدات، اقوام و قبایل) is an organ of the Central Government of Afghanistan.

== History ==
The Ministry of Tribes and Nationalities was originally the Directorate of Tribal Affairs established in 1934 to deal with problems of the tribes inside Afghanistan.

== List ==
Afghanistan's Minister of Tribal and Border Affairs
name	term	appointed by	notes
Faiz Mohammed	1975-?	Mohammed Daoud Khan	Republic of Afghanistan
Faiz Mohammed	11 January 1980 - 11 September 1980	Babrak Karmal	Democratic Republic of Afghanistan
Amanullah Zadran	2001-12—mid-2002	Hamid Karzai	Formerly a Taliban leader.; A member of the Pashtun ethnic group.; Appointed during the Afghan Interim Administration.
Arif Nurzai	mid-2002 to mid-2004(?)	Hamid Karzai	A member of the Pashtun ethnic group.; Appointed during the Afghan Transitional Administration from late 2002 to 2004.
Abdul Karim Barahawi		Hamid Karzai	
Norullah Noori	7 September 2021 – present	Hibatullah Akhundzada	Islamic Emirate of Afghanistan

Former Ministers of Border and Tribal Affairs

- Amanullah Zadran (2001),
- Arif Noorzai (Nurzai) (2004),
- Abdul Karim Brahui (Nimruz) (2008),
- Asadullah Khalid (2008 - 2009) and (20100628 - 20120914)
- Haji Din Mohammad nominated, not approved by Wolesi Jirga (20120915)
- Mohammad Akram Khpalwak (20130710-20140930)
- Mohammad Akram Khpalwak Acting Minister of Border Affairs (20141001-20141208)
- acting Minister of Borders and Tribes Dr Seyyed Ahmad Haqbin (20141209)
- Gulab Mangal (20150418, 20161018)
- Abdul Ghafour Lewal acting Minister (20170526)
- Mohammad Shafiq Gul Agha Sherzai (20170725, 20171204 confirmed, 20180621, 20190813, 20200831)
- Mohibullah Samim nominated and acting (20200831) confirmed (20201201)
- Mawlawi Noorullah Noori Nurullah Nuri (20210907)

Deputy Minister for the Ministry of Border and Tribal Affairs:

- Mullah Abdul Khaleq Akhund (20220224)

Deputy Minister of Borders:

- Muhammad Yaqub Ahmadzai Mohammad Yaqoub Ahmadzai (20091024, 20131105, 20170831)
- Haji Gul Mohammad (20210921)
- Maulvi Ahmad Taha (20211122)
- Maulvi Gul Zarin Kochi (20210921) Head of Kochi Affairs at the Ministry of Border and Tribal Affairs (20211122)
- Mohammad Qasim Khalid, the former deputy head of the Ministry of Borders and Tribal Affairs, has been appointed as the governor of (20221200)
- Ahmad Taha deputy minister of the Borders and Tribal Affairs (20230504)
- Abdul Rahman Haqqani deputy minister of Borders and Tribal Affairs (20230504)
