= Chakhansur (village) =

Chakhansur چکانسور چخانسور
- Town
- Location within Afghanistan
- Coordinates: 31°10′28″N 62°03′52″E
- Country: Afghanistan
- Province: Nimruz Province
- District: Chakhansur District
- Time zone: + 4.30

Chakhansur (Balochi: چکانسور, Dari: چخانسور) is a town in southwestern Afghanistan near Iranian border. It is the center of Chakhansur District of Nimruz Province.

Chakhansur is a principal town of the large Khashrud delta oasis in northeastern Sistan.

== See also ==
- Chakhansur District

== Sources ==
Encyclopædia Iranica: ČAḴĀNSŪR, accessed: March 2012.
