= Sanjrani =

Baloch tribe

Languages
- Sindhi, Balochi and Saraiki

Religion
- Islam

Related ethnic groups
- Baloch

The Sanjrani (Balochi: سنجرانی) is a sub-branch of the Baloch tribe settled in the Sindh and Balochistan provinces of Pakistan. and Afghanistan.

== Origins ==
The Sanjrani are a diverse tribe. According to Nabi Bakhsh Baloch, the Rind are divided into 11 sub-tribes and 60 clans which include the Sanjrani. Sanjrani is also a clan of the Rustamani sub-tribe of the Mazari. The present chief of Chagai and Sardar of Sanjrani tribe is Sardar Hakeem Ali Sanjrani.

== Notable people ==
- Former Chairman of the Senate of Pakistan, Sadiq Sanjrani
- Former Minister and Ambassador to Kenya, Abdul Qadir Sanjrani
- Former Chief Secretary Sindh, Muhammad Aslam Sanjrani

== See also ==
- Sanjrani Chiefdom
- Ibrahim Khan Sanjrani Fort
