= Ibrahim Khan Sanjrani Fort =

Fort in Afghanistan

- Chakhansur District in Afghanistan
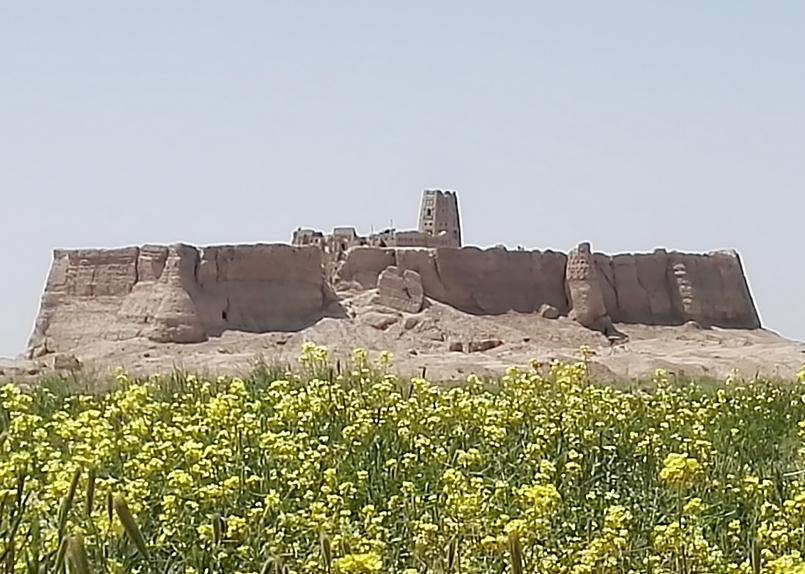
- A view of The Castle in the spring of 2018

Location
- موقعیت جغرافیایی
- Coordinates: 31°10′N 62°04′E
- Area: 3000 square meters

Site history
- Materials: Mud, raw clay, wood

Ibrahim Khan Sanjrani Fort (Balochi: چکانسوری کلات or ابراهیم‌خان سنجرانی کلات) is located in Nimruz Province, Chakhansur District, Afghanistan. The fort made of mud, clay and wood is believed to have been built around 1625-1630.

== History ==
The fort is reported to belong to the Sanjrani Chiefdom. In a battle between Ibrahim Sanjrani and Abdur Rahman Khan in 1882, Sanjrani was defeated and the Afghan governor of Farāh captured the fort.

== Current status ==
Many parts of the fort are crumbling due to erosion and it is at risk of deterioration.

== See also ==
- Emirate of Afghanistan
