= Partisans of National Liberation of Afghanistan =

Baloch nationalist guerrilla group

Partisans of National Liberation of Afghanistan (PNLA) was founded in 1979 in Nimruz province of Afghanistan by Abdul Karim Brahui and Gul Mohammad Rahimi. It was a Baloch nationalist guerrilla group, representing the Baloch minority of southwestern Afghanistan.
