= Farah City Hospital =

Hospital in Farah, Afghanistan

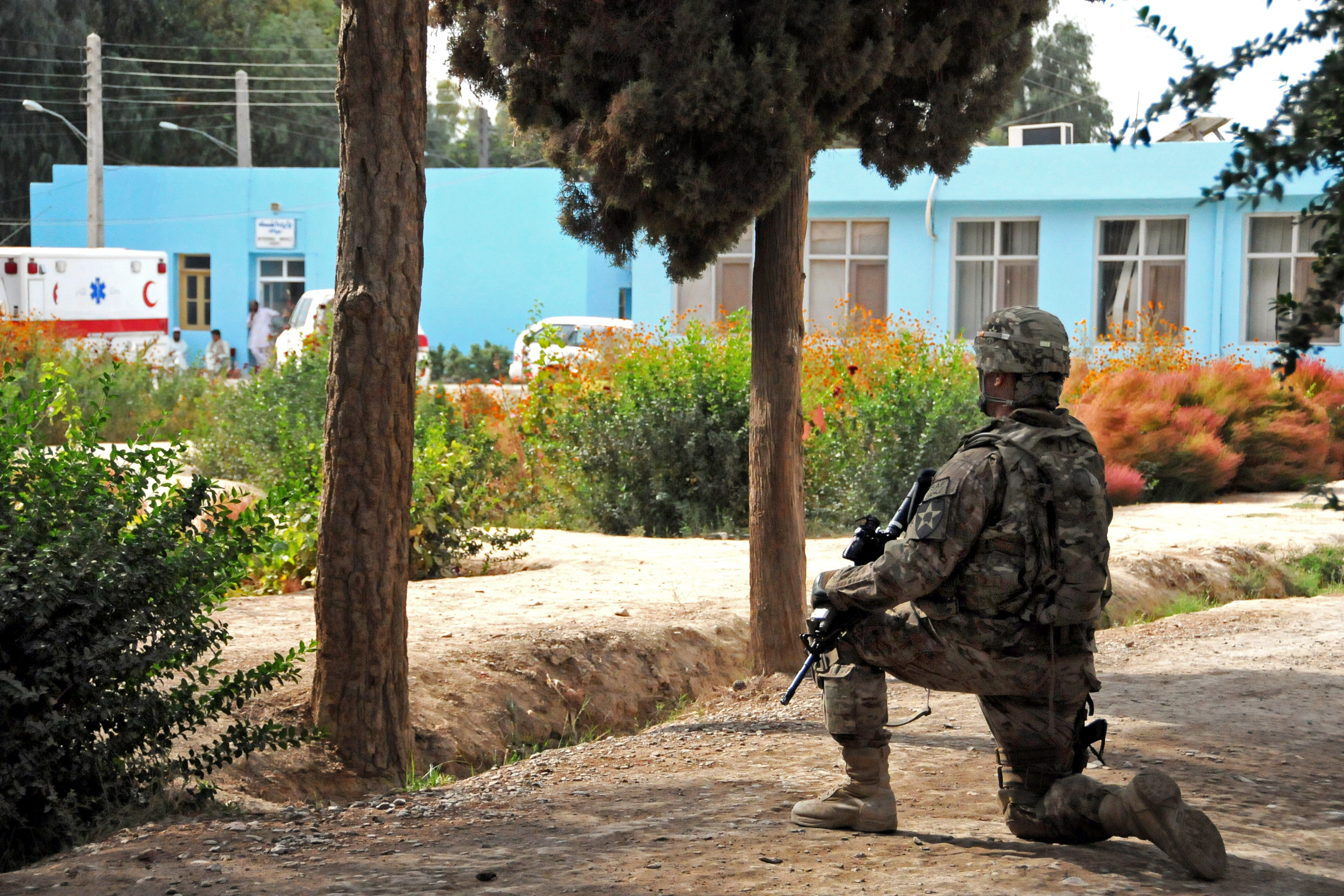
A U.S. Army soldier provides security at the hospital during a meeting between Americans and the hospitals employees, 2012

Farah City Hospital in Farah, Afghanistan holds major significance as the regional hospital of Farah Province. The hospital has treated many people who have been affected by U.S. bombing. Officials from the hospital also have an authoritative stance in healthcare in the province and are often sent to review smaller clinics across the region. In 2010, electricity was installed in the hospital.
