= Kang District =

District of Nimruz Province, Afghanistan

Coordinates: 31.3240°N 61.7753°E

Kang District (Balochi: کنگ ئے دمگ, Persian: ولسوالی کنگ) is a district of Nimruz Province in Afghanistan. It has a population of about 13,514 as of 2004, which is 70% ethnic Baloch, 15% Pashtun, and 15% Tajik.

== Notable people ==
- Rouh Gul Khairzad (born 1974), politician

== See also ==
- Districts of Afghanistan
