= Farah, Afghanistan =

Farah فراه
- Provincial capital
- Location in Afghanistan
- Coordinates: 32°20′37″N 62°7′10″E
- Country: Afghanistan
- Province: Farah
- District: Farah

Government
  - Type: Municipality
  - Mayor: Mufti Sardar Mohammad Mirsad

Area
  - Land: 29 km^{2} (11 sq mi)
- Elevation: 650 m (2,130 ft)

Population (2025)
  - Provincial capital: 141,091
  - Urban: 48,132
  - Rural: 92,959
- Time zone: UTC+04:30 (Afghanistan Time)
- ISO 3166 code: AF-FAH

Farah (Pashto (Note: Pashto pronunciation: [pa.rɑ, fa.rɑ]), Dari (Note: Dari pronunciation: [fä.ɾɑ́ː]): فراه) is a city in western Afghanistan that serves as the capital of Farah Province. It is within the jurisdiction of Farah District and has an estimated population of 141,091 people. Mufti Sardar Mohammad Mirsad is the current mayor of the city.

Farah has a number of bazaars, business centers, public parks, banks, hotels, restaurants, mosques, hospitals, universities, and places to play sports or just relax. It is home to Farah University, which is located in the southeastern part of the city. The Farah Airport is a short distance north of the university, next to the main road leading to Delaram in the east. The tomb and mausoleum of Muhammad Jaunpuri is also in Farah.

Sitting at an elevation of approximately 650 m (2,130 ft) above sea level, Farah is one of the largest cities in western Afghanistan. It is located on the Farah River, roughly 125 km (78 mi) from the Afghanistan–Iran border. The city has a land area of 29 km^{2} (11 sq mi) or 2,949 ha (7,290 acres). In 2025 there were 5,299 dwelling units in it.

== History ==
=== Ancient history ===
The Citadel at Farah is probably one of a series of fortresses constructed by Alexander the Great, the city being an intermediate stop between Alexandria Arachosia (modern Kandahar) and Herat, the location of another of Alexander's fortresses. The "Alexandria" prefix was added to the city's name when Alexander came in 330 BC.

Under the Parthian Empire, Farah fell under the satrapy of Aria, and was one of its key cities. It is thought to be Phra, mentioned by Isidorus Characenus in the 1st century AD, or Alexandria Prophthasia mentioned by Pliny the Elder, Stephanus of Byzantium (Stephanus also called it Phrada (Φράδα)) and the 4th century Peutinger Map.

In the 5th century AD Farah was one of the major strongholds on the eastern frontier of the Sassanid Empire. It was of some strategic importance, commanding the approaches to India and Sistan from Herat.

=== Medieval and early modern ===
The region came under Muslim rule in 651 during the Muslim conquest of Persia. The region was historically controlled by the Tahirids followed by the Saffarids, Samanids, Ghaznavids, Ghurids, Khwarazmshahs, Ilkhanids, Kartids, Timurids, Khanate of Bukhara, and Safavids until the early-18th century when it became part of the Afghan Hotaki dynasty followed by the Durrani Empire.

Islam was introduced in the region during the 7th century and later the Saffarid dynasty took control of Farah. During the 10th century, Mahmud of Ghazni took possession of the city, followed by the Ghurids in the 12th century. Genghis Khan and his army passed through in the 13th century, and the city fell to the native Kartids who lost it to the Timurids. It was controlled by the Safavids until 1709, when they were defeated by the Hotaki Afghan forces of Mirwais Hotak. It became part of the Durrani Empire in the mid 18th century. Farah was seized by Sultan Jan, then ruler of Herat, but re-captured by Dost Mohammad Khan on 8 July 1862.

=== 20th century ===
At the start of the Soviet invasion in 1979, Farah was, along with Herat, Shindand, and Kandahar, occupied by the Soviet 357th and 66th Motorized Rifle Divisions.

The Afghan mujahideen established themselves in the Farah area in 1979. They maintained a presence in the city until they were forced out in 1982, and established a stronghold at the nearby mountain Lor Koh, which they renamed Sharafat Koh ("Honor Mountain"). Primary among the Farah mujahideen groups was the Sharafat Kuh Front.

Following the collapse of the Soviet-backed government of Mohammad Najibullah in 1992, Ismail Khan returned to power in Herat, and came to control Farah, as well as the other surrounding provinces of Ghor and Badghis, until Herat fell to the Taliban in 1995.

=== 21st century ===
The roads in Farah Province have seen massive improvement since May 2005. The education system has been greatly improved and a great number of illegal weapons have been collected and destroyed in the province by a Provincial Reconstruction Team. The United States built a base at Farah Airport, which also housed the Afghan National Security Forces.

On 7 May 2009, thousands of Afghan villagers shouting "Death to America" and "Death to the Government" protested in Farah over the 4 May Granai airstrike by US forces that killed 147 civilians. Clashes with police started when people from the three villages struck by US B1-bombers brought 15 newly discovered bodies in a truck to the house of the provincial governor. Four protesters were wounded when police opened fire. Going by the account of survivors, the air raid was not a brief attack by several aircraft acting on mistaken intelligence, but a sustained bombardment in which three villages were pounded to pieces. An Afghan government investigation concluded on May 16, 2009 with the Afghan Defense Ministry announcing an official death toll of 140 villagers. A copy of the government's list of the names and ages of each of the 140 dead showed that 93 of those killed were children, and only 22 were adult men.

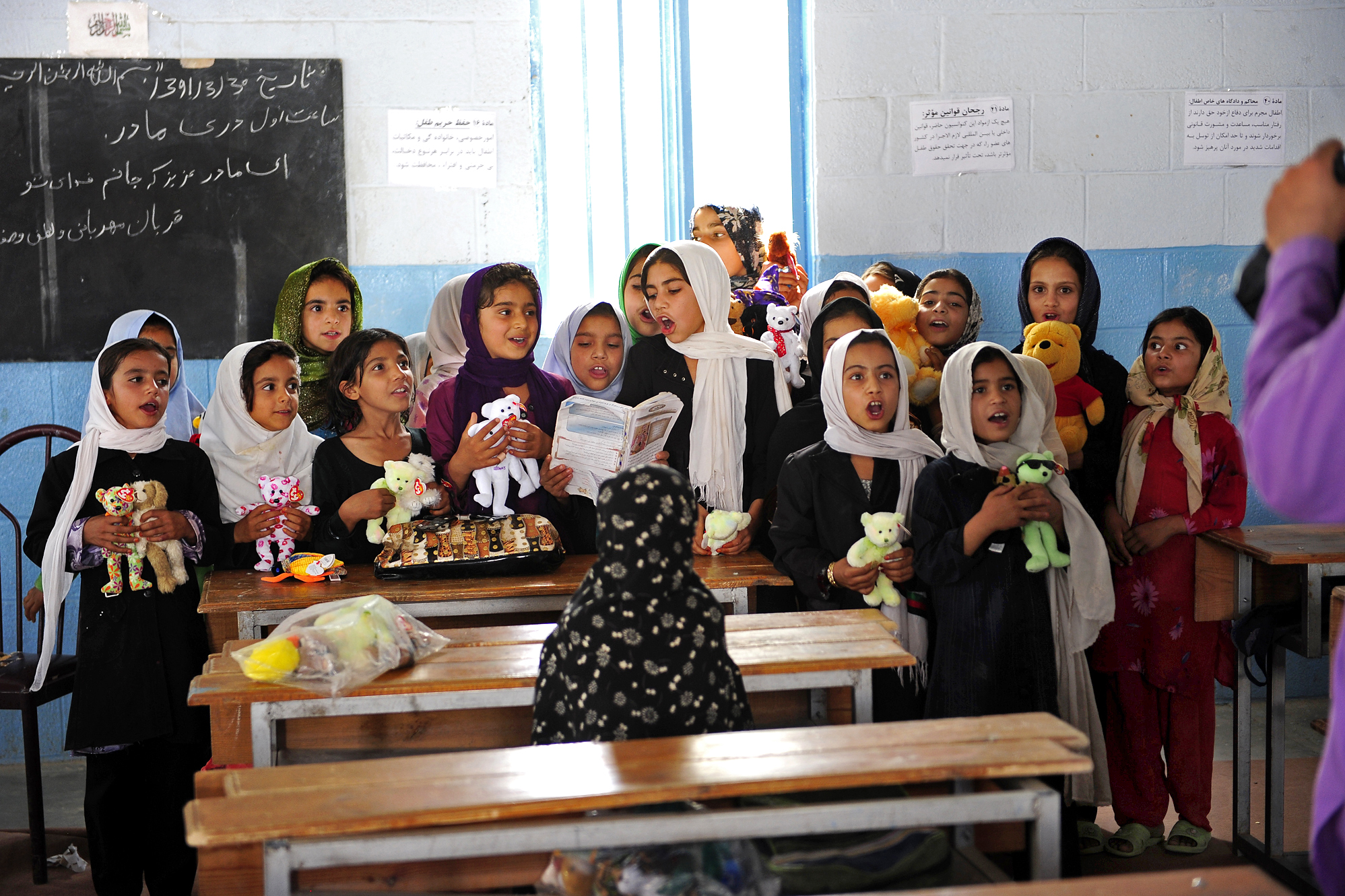
Young girls from Farah singing at a school in 2012

On 20 November 2009, attack by a suicide bomber on a motorcycle was reported near a market in Farah Naz city, killing 17 people and wounding 29. Mullah Hayatullah was the Taliban commander for Farah province and was reported to be known to run suicide training camps. On 3 April 2013, the Taliban killed 34 civilians and 10 members of the security forces, using guns and bombs.

During late evening of 14 May 2018, Taliban fighters stormed the city from multiple directions. By 15 May 2018, the Taliban, during their annual spring offensive, captured Farah from the Afghan government, with only the provincial governor's compound remaining under the control of Afghan forces. However, by 16 May Afghan Armed Forces, along with elements of the US Army's 2–12th infantry regiment belonging to the 4th infantry division along with several interpreters backed by the United States Air Force recaptured the city, while fighting moved on to the outlying areas of it. National Directorate of Security headquarters have been razed during the fighting. Taliban fighters have claimed that they withdrew after achieving their objectives and capturing weapon and equipment stockpiles. On May 16, government security forces backed by US air support reasserted control over Farah after driving the Taliban out of the city center. The security forces then conducted a clearing operation. Abdul Basir Salangi, governor of Farah Province at the time, said that the clashes left at least 25 members of the government security forces and five civilians dead, and at least 300 Taliban fighters were also killed.

On 28 May 2020, the Taliban killed seven policemen in Farah in an attack on a police post during which eight Taliban militants were also killed. The attack was conducted just after the end of the three-day Eid ceasefire announced by the Taliban in the country, which lasted from 24 to 26 May 2020. During the 2021 Taliban offensive, Farah fell to the Taliban on or about 10 August 2021.

== Geography ==
Farah is at 650 m (2,130 ft) above sea level, between the major cities of Kandahar and Herat. It has a land area of 29 km^{2} (11 sq mi). The city has a very clear grid of roads distributed through the higher-density residential areas. However, barren land (35%) and vacant plots (25%) combine for 60% of the total land use.

=== Climate ===
Farah has a hot desert climate (Köppen climate classification: BWh). In winter there is more rainfall than in summer, and there is no almost rain from June to October. Snowfall has not been observed from 1960 to 1983.

The average annual temperature in Farah is 20.7 °C (69.3 °F). About 95 mm (3.74 in) of precipitation falls annually, and February is the wettest month, receiving 22.8 mm (0.90 in) of rainfall on average. In August 2009, Farah recorded a temperature of 49.9 °C (121.8 °F), which is the highest temperature to have ever been recorded in Afghanistan. July is the warmest month, with an average high of 42.6 °C (108.7 °F) and an average low of 25.2 °C (77.4 °F), while January is the coldest, with an average low of 0.9 °C (33.6 °F).

Climate data for Farah (normals and extremes 1960–1983)
Month	Jan	Feb	Mar	Apr	May	Jun	Jul	Aug	Sep	Oct	Nov	Dec	Year
Record high °C (°F)	28.3 (82.9)	34.0 (93.2)	34.5 (94.1)	42.0 (107.6)	44.2 (111.6)	47.8 (118.0)	49.5 (121.1)	47.2 (117.0)	43.9 (111.0)	37.9 (100.2)	32.2 (90.0)	26.6 (79.9)	49.5 (121.1)
Mean daily maximum °C (°F)	14.6 (58.3)	17.1 (62.8)	23.1 (73.6)	29.5 (85.1)	35.5 (95.9)	41.0 (105.8)	42.6 (108.7)	40.8 (105.4)	36.2 (97.2)	29.9 (85.8)	22.7 (72.9)	17.2 (63.0)	29.2 (84.5)
Daily mean °C (°F)	7.2 (45.0)	9.9 (49.8)	15.6 (60.1)	21.7 (71.1)	27.0 (80.6)	32.2 (90.0)	34.3 (93.7)	31.9 (89.4)	26.7 (80.1)	20.2 (68.4)	12.9 (55.2)	8.8 (47.8)	20.7 (69.3)
Mean daily minimum °C (°F)	0.9 (33.6)	3.4 (38.1)	8.2 (46.8)	13.8 (56.8)	18.0 (64.4)	22.9 (73.2)	25.2 (77.4)	22.3 (72.1)	17.1 (62.8)	10.5 (50.9)	4.3 (39.7)	1.1 (34.0)	12.3 (54.2)
Record low °C (°F)	−10.5 (13.1)	−8.0 (17.6)	−3.0 (26.6)	2.6 (36.7)	7.0 (44.6)	4.0 (39.2)	16.0 (60.8)	12.0 (53.6)	5.3 (41.5)	−0.7 (30.7)	−11.9 (10.6)	−11.0 (12.2)	−11.9 (10.6)
Average precipitation mm (inches)	24.3 (0.96)	22.8 (0.90)	22.5 (0.89)	8.5 (0.33)	2.0 (0.08)	0 (0)	0 (0)	0 (0)	0.1 (0.00)	1.3 (0.05)	3.3 (0.13)	10.3 (0.41)	95.1 (3.75)
Average rainy days	4	4	4	3	1	0	0	0	0	0	1	2	19
Average relative humidity (%)	60	58	53	50	38	30	29	31	32	38	43	50	43
Mean monthly sunshine hours	204.3	198.1	236.3	253.3	333.4	360.6	358.9	345.8	318.2	288.4	251.1	201.9	3,350.3
Source: NOAA NCEI

== Demographics ==
According to Afghanistan's National Statistics and Information Authority, the Farah municipality has an estimated population of 141,091 people. In 2015 the population was 109,000 people. Pashtuns form the majority of the city's population, constituting 80%, with the Tajiks at 10% and the 10% remaining Balochis. The main languages spoken are Pashto and Dari.

== Economy ==
The city is a major trading and farming center in this area.

=== Transport ===
The Farah Airport is located next to the city and as of May 2014 had regularly scheduled flights to Herat.

There are secondary roads in different directions from the city. As of 2010, Farah had 30 km (19 mi) of paved roads, 136 km (85 mi) of gravel roads and 150 km (93 mi) of unpaved roads. The major road is Route 515 which connects Farah to the Ring Road. Both roads were improved in 2009 with support from several ISAF countries.

== Education ==
There are a number of schools in Farah. There are also a number of universities.

== Healthcare ==
There are a number of hospitals and health clinics in the city. The Farah City Hospital is one of the largest hospitals.

== Sports ==
Cricket and football are the most popular sports in Afghanistan. Other sports that people of Farah enjoy are futsal and volleyball.

== Books relating to Farah ==
Little has been written about Farah; some fleeting references can be found in works related to Afghanistan or works that focus on the Great Game Politics of the UK and the Russian Empire during the 19th century. However, 2011 saw the publication of Words in the Dust by author Trent Reedy, who was one of the first American soldiers to enter Farah in 2004. His book, while fiction, is set in Farah City and the wider province. Also in 2021, Trent Reedy also published another book with a writer currently in Afghanistan named Jawad Arash. In the book Enduring Freedom, it was set in the province of Farah.

== See also ==
- List of cities in Afghanistan
