= Chakhansur District =

Chakhansur Balochi: چکانسور دمگ Persian: ولسوالی چخانسور Pashto: چخانسور ولسوالۍ
- District
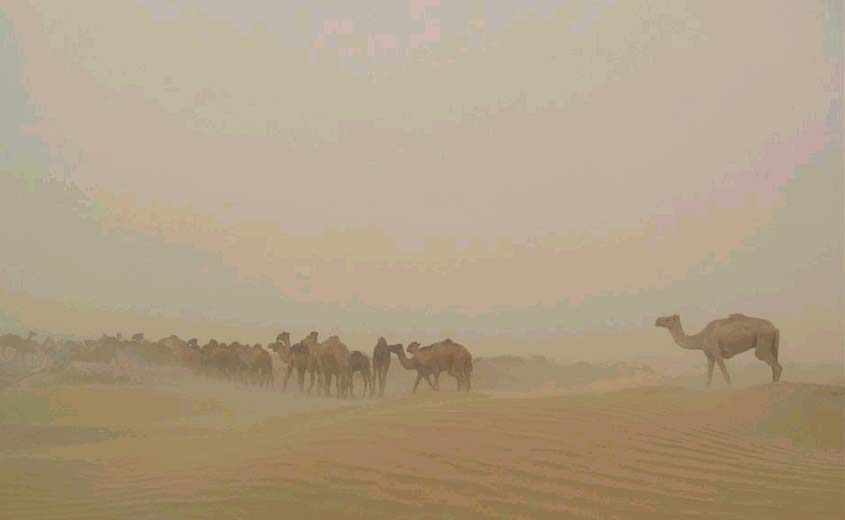

- Location within Afghanistan
- Coordinates: 31°10′N 62°04′E
- Country: Afghanistan
- Province: Nimruz Province
- Capital: Chakhansur

Population
  - Estimate (2004): 11,165
- Time zone: + 4.30

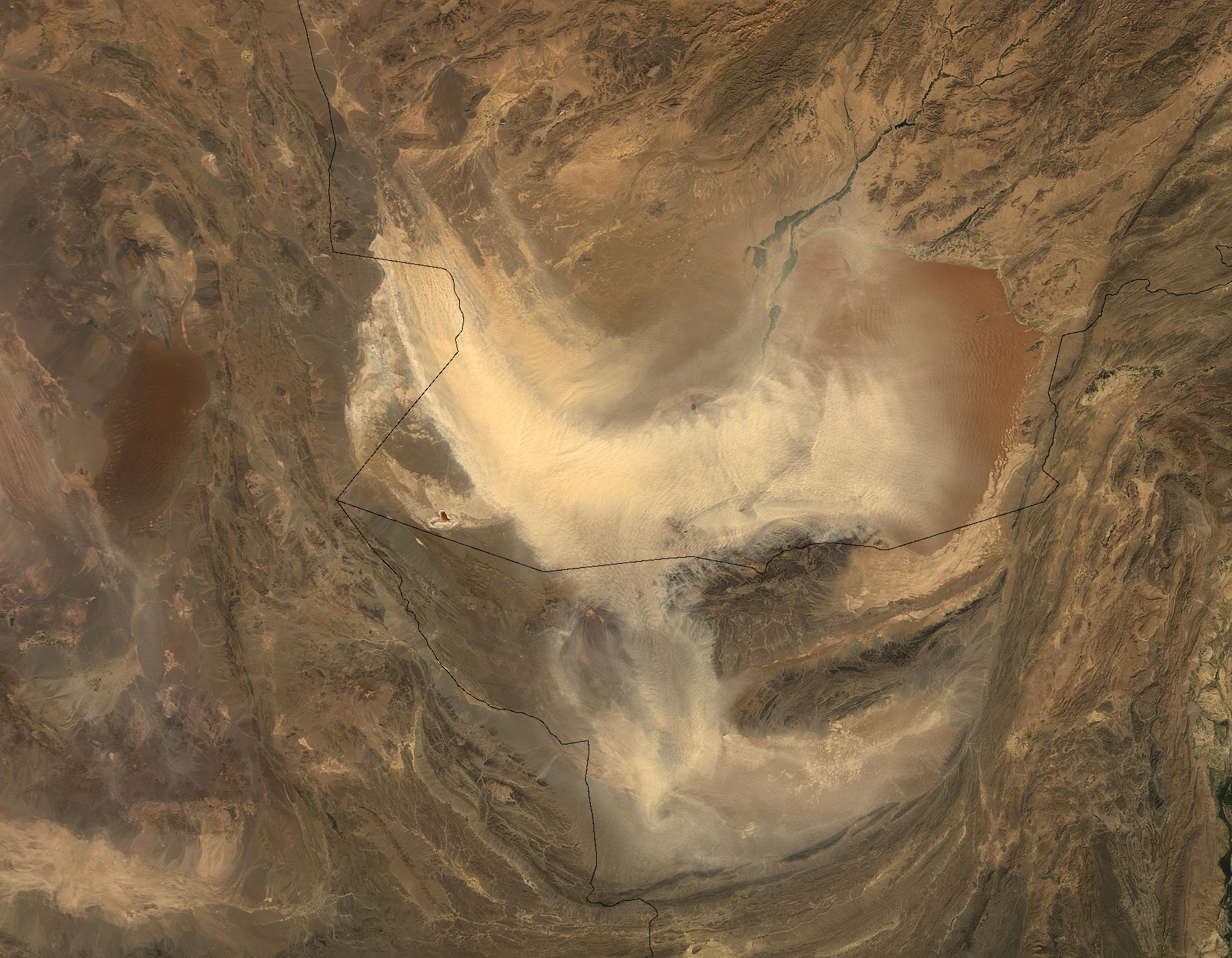
Satellite image of southern Afghanistan, Pakistan, and Iran in dust storm

Chakhansur (Balochi: چکانسور دمگ, Persian: ولسوالی چخانسور, Pashto: چخانسور ولسوالۍ) is a district in the Nimruz Province of Afghanistan. It has a population of about 11,165 as of 2004, which includes Baloch that form the majority followed by Tajik, and Pashtun ethnic groups.

The economy is primarily based on agriculture, and availability of the water necessary for irrigation depends on the status of the Sistan Basin, an endorheic basin which periodically becomes dry.

This area of Afghanistan was a major medieval cultural hub on the Silk Road but most ancient structures are now covered by sand. Signs of historical irrigation systems, including canals, are still visible in the Chakhansur area while elsewhere canals are filled with silt and agricultural fields buried by shifting sand. The area is relatively sparsely populated. There continue to be problems with water control and periodic flooding and drought.

Ibrahim Khan Sanjrani Fort is located in this district.

In 2004 the Chakhansur farmers had been experiencing a severe and long term drought. Even with help from the World Food Program, perhaps as many as 20,000 have abandoned their homes, to search for water and jobs elsewhere.

== See also ==
- Chakhansur
- Ibrahim Khan Sanjrani Fort
