= Mount Khajeh =

Black basalt hill in Lake Hamun, Sistan and Baluchestan province, Iran

Mount Oshida
- Mount Khajeh
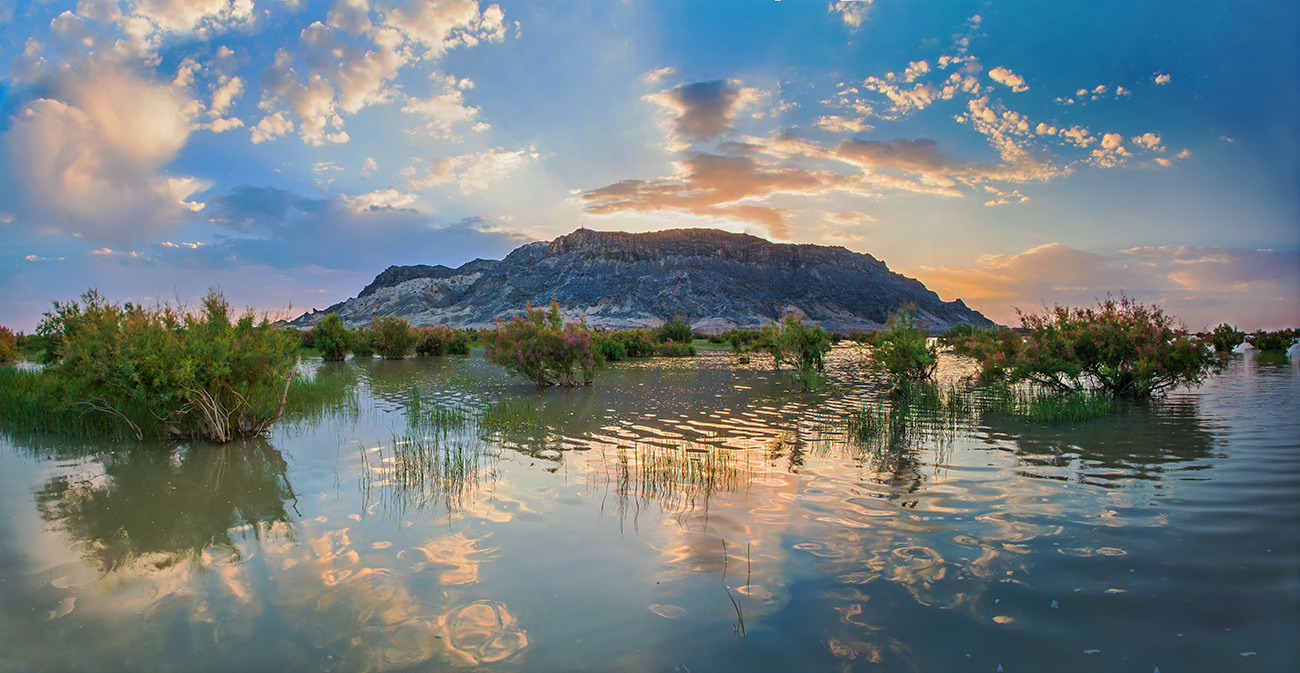
- Mount Khajeh

Highest point
- Elevation: 609 m (1,998 ft)
- Coordinates: 30.9391°N 61.2455°E

Geography
- Location within Iran Location within West and Central Asia
- Location: Sistan and Baluchestan, Iran

Geology
- Mountain type: Hill
- Rock type: Black basalt

Iran National Heritage List
- Official name: Kuh-e Khwajeh
- Type: Mound
- Designated: 1931
- Reference no.: 54
- Conservation organization: Cultural Heritage, Handicrafts and Tourism Organization of Iran

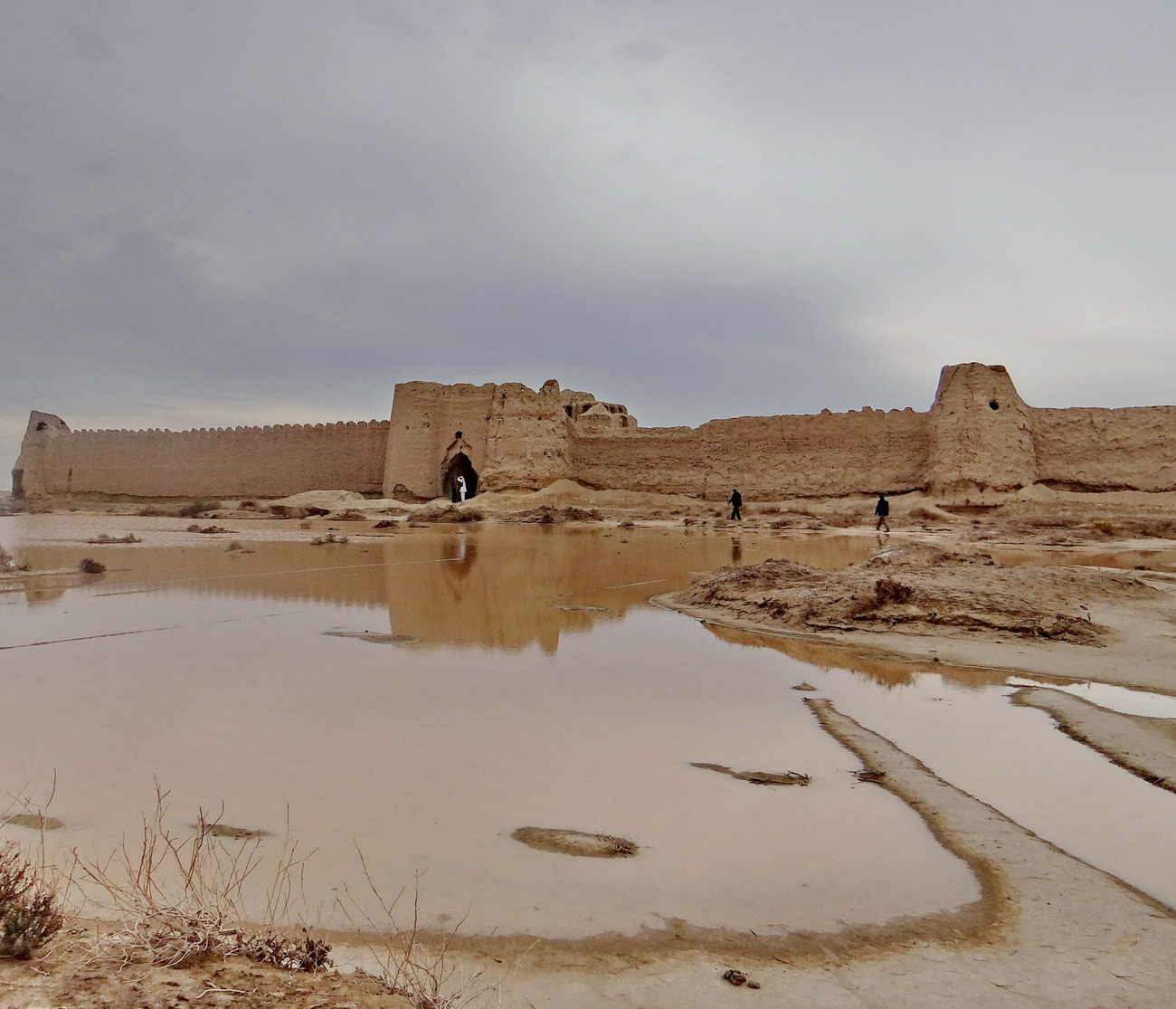
Rostam castle on Mount Khajeh

Mount Oshida or Mount Khwaja or Mount Khwajeh (Persian: کوه خواجه، کوه اوشیدا, romanized: Kūh-e Oshīdā Or Kuh-e Kh^{v}ājeh) is a flat-topped black basalt hill rising up as an island in the middle of Lake Hamun, in the Iranian province of Sistan and Baluchestan.

The trapezoid-shaped basalt lava outcropping, located 30 km southwest of the town of Zabol, rises to 609 meters above sea level and has a diameter ranging from 2.0 to 2.5 kilometres. It is the only natural height in the Sistan area, and is named after an Islamic pilgrimage site on the hill: the tomb and shrine of Khwaja Ali Mahdi, a descendant of Ali ibn Abi Talib.

Mount Khwaja is also considered an important archaeological site. On the southern promontory of the eastern slope, the ruins of a citadel complex - known as the Ghagha-Shahr - with its remains of a fire temple date to pre-Islamic Iran. According to Zoroastrian legend, Lake Hamun is "the keeper of Zoroaster's seed." In Zoroastrian eschatology, when the final renovation of the world is near, maidens will enter the lake and then give birth to the saoshyans, the saviours of humankind.

The citadel complex was first investigated by Marc Aurel Stein in 1915–1916. The site was later excavated by Ernst Herzfeld, and was again investigated in part by Giorgio Gullini in a short expedition of 1960. Initially, Herzfeld tentatively dated the palace complex to the 1st century CE, that is, to the Arsacid period (248 BCE-224 CE). Herzfeld later revised his estimate to a later date and today the Sassanid period (224-651 CE) is usually considered to be more likely. Three bas-reliefs on the outer walls that depict riders and horses are attributed to this later period. Beyond the citadel at the top of the plateau are several other unrelated buildings, of uncertain function and probably dating to the Islamic period.

== Murals ==
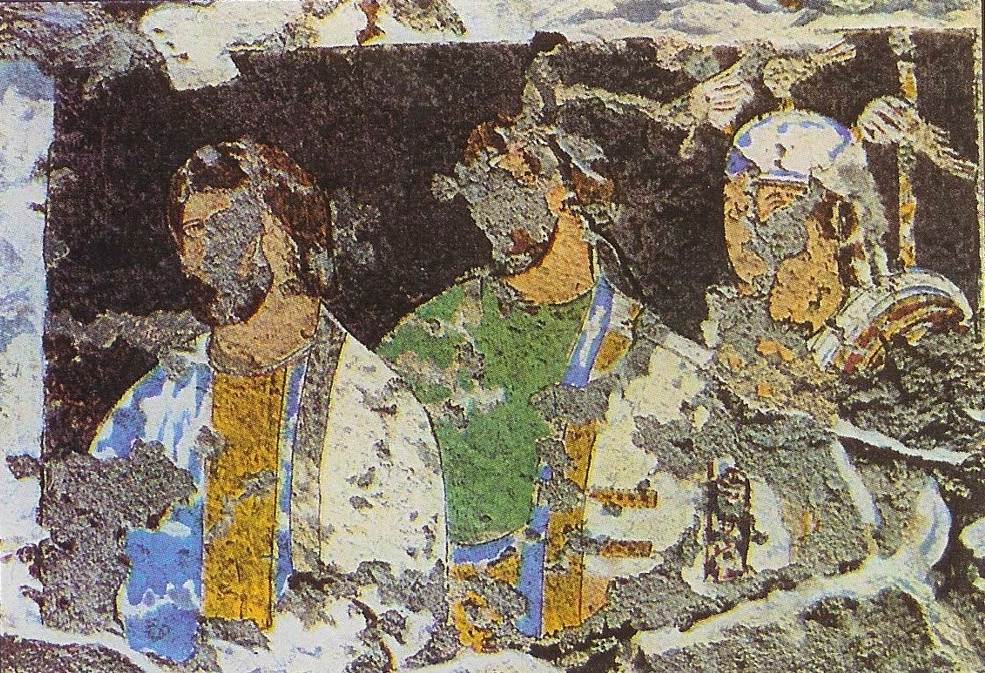
Mount Khajeh mural.

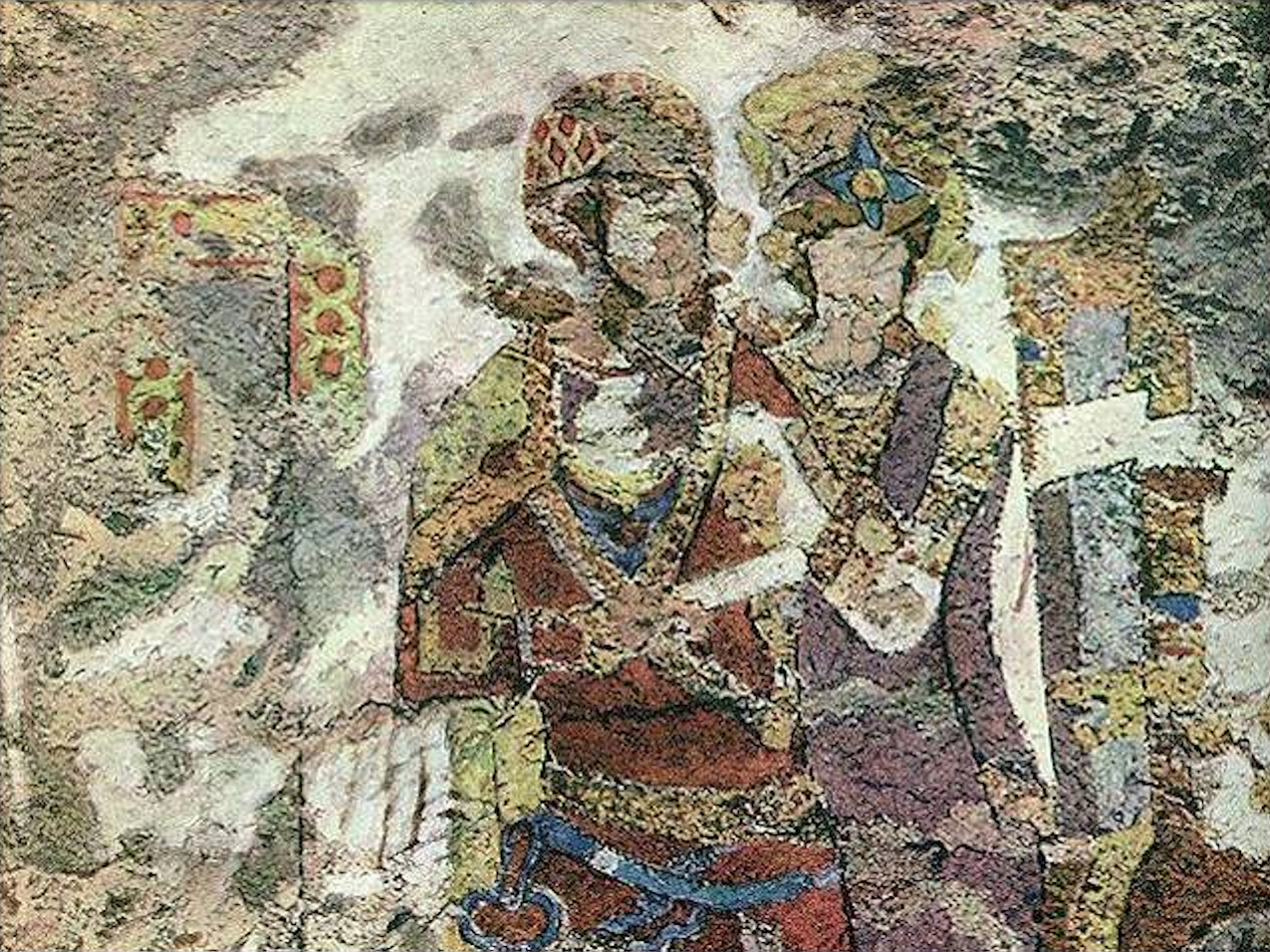
Mount Khajeh mural.

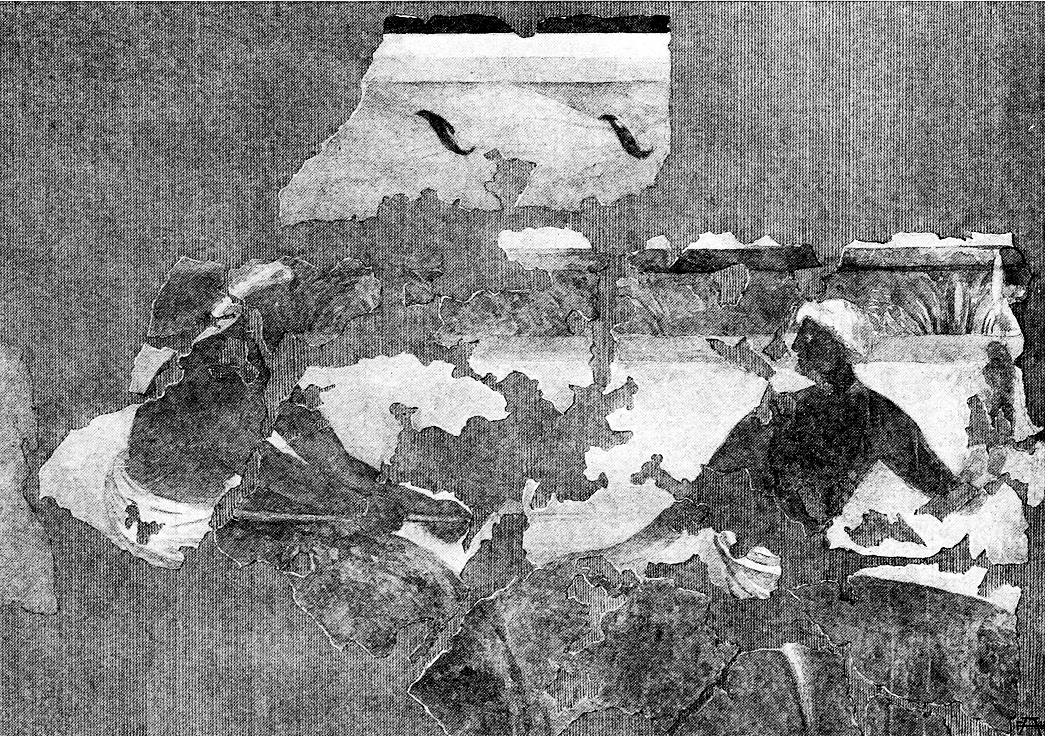
Drawing of a Mount Khajeh painting, Ghahga-Shahr.

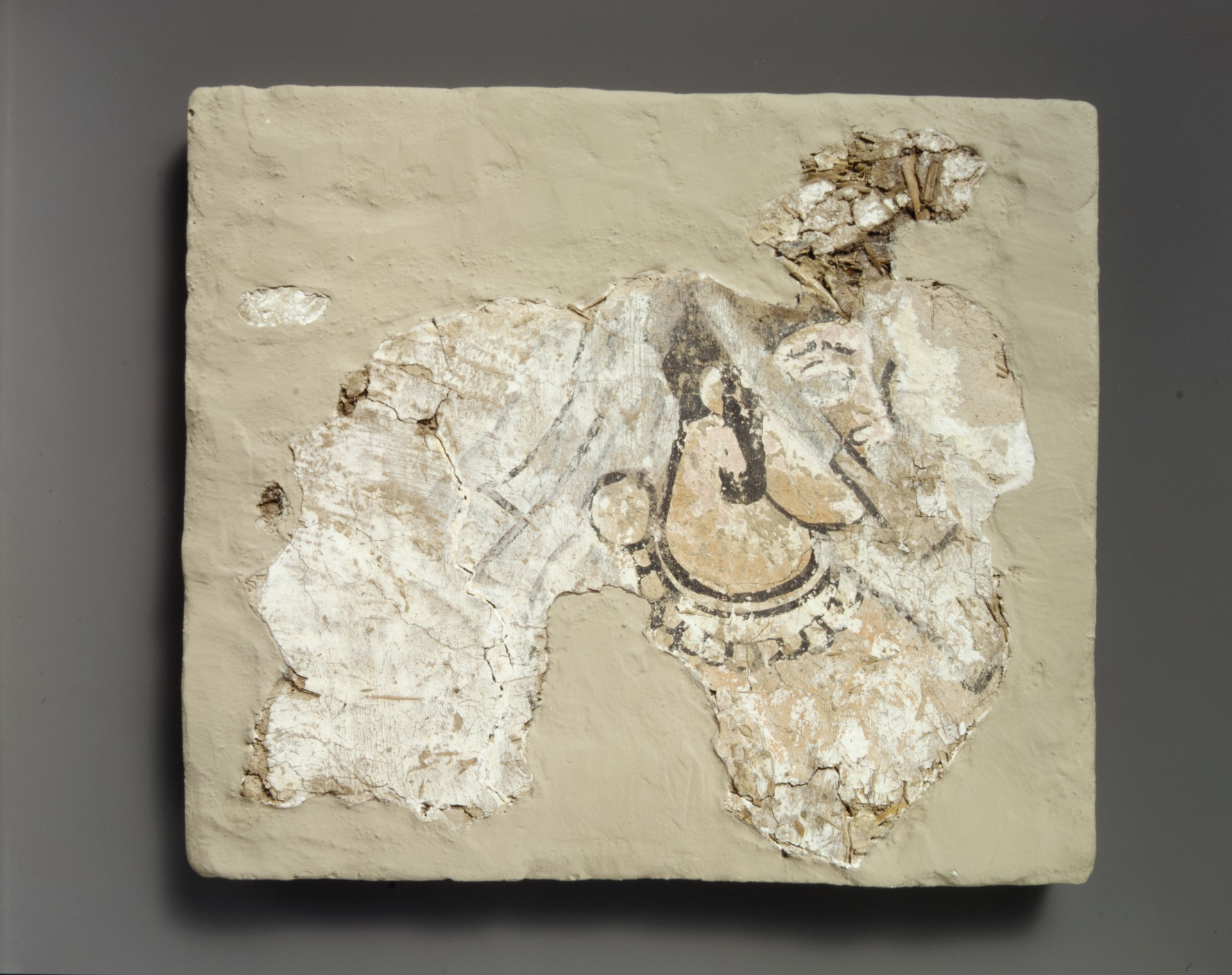
Kuh-i Khwaja Sasanian wall painting of a woman with mouth cover, 7th century CE.

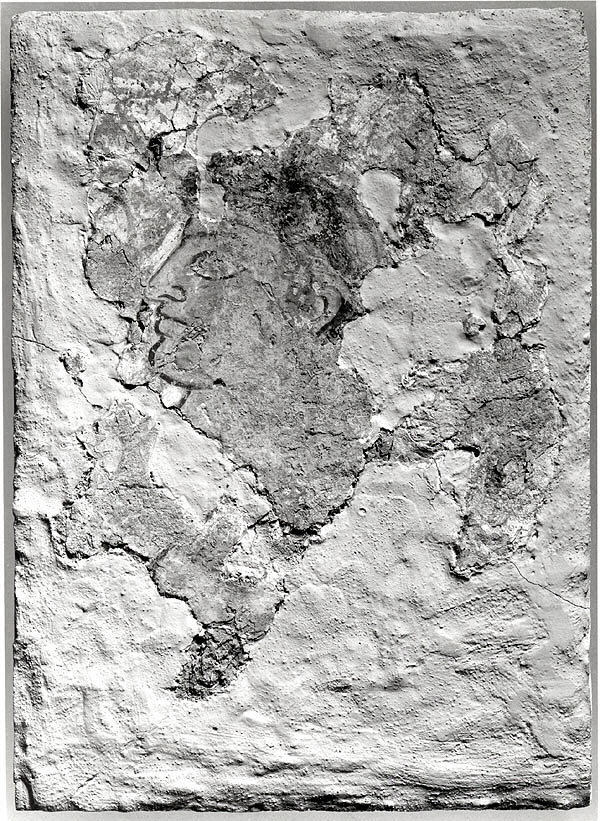
Kuh-i Khwaja Sasanian wall painting, 7th century CE.

== Ruins ==
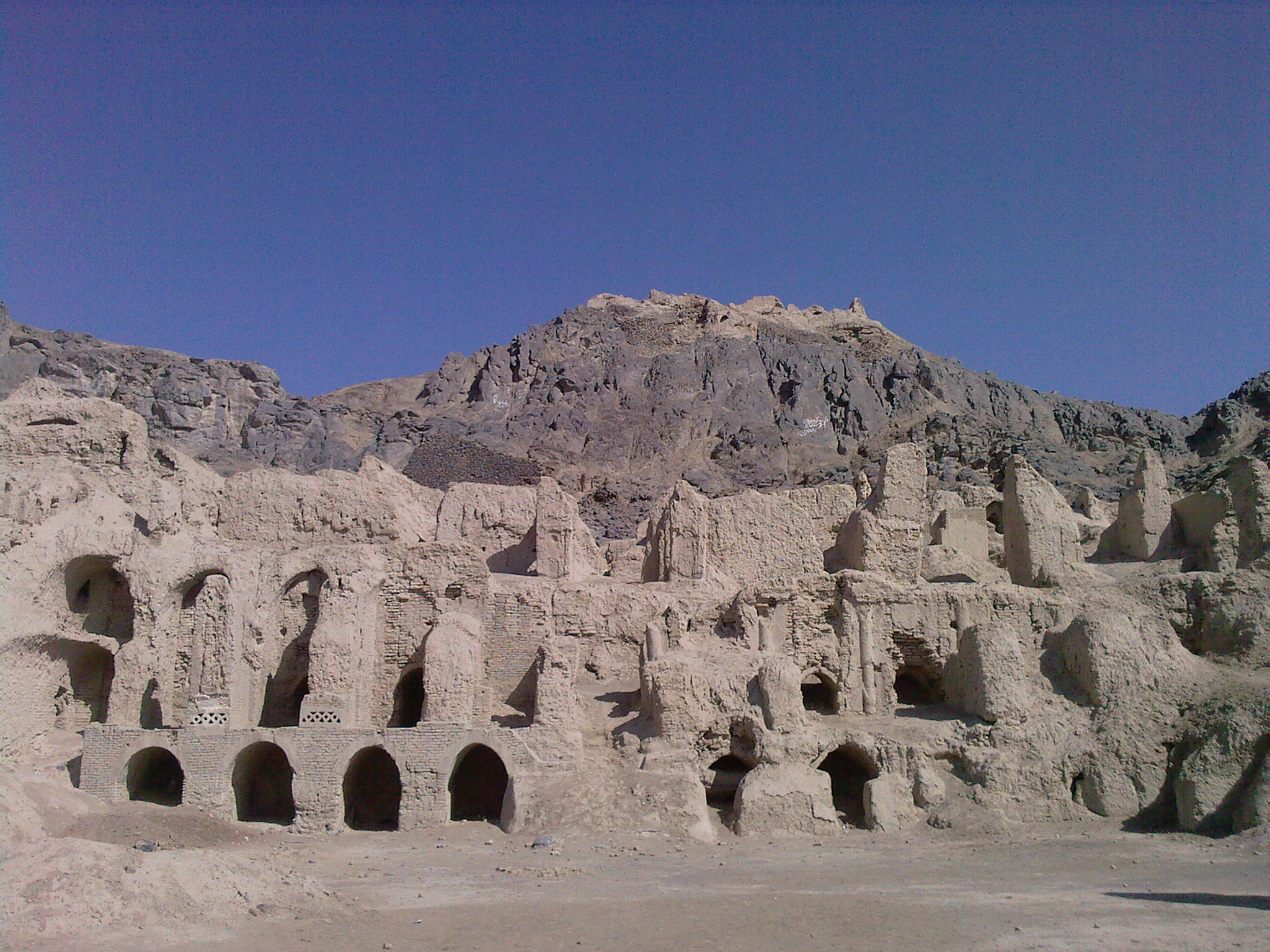

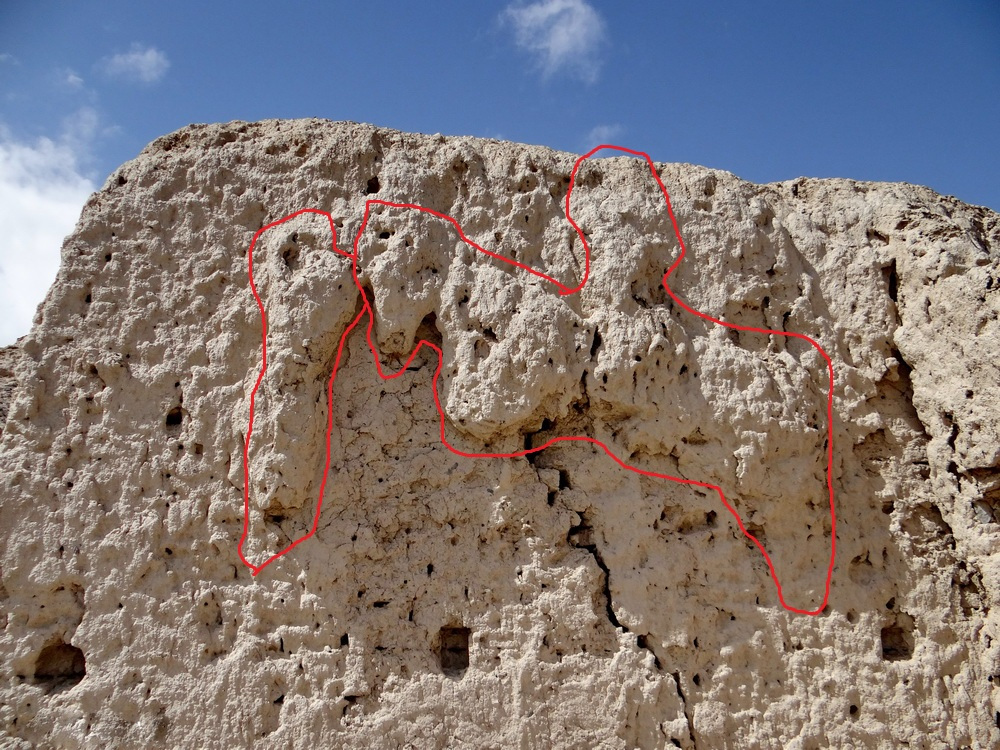

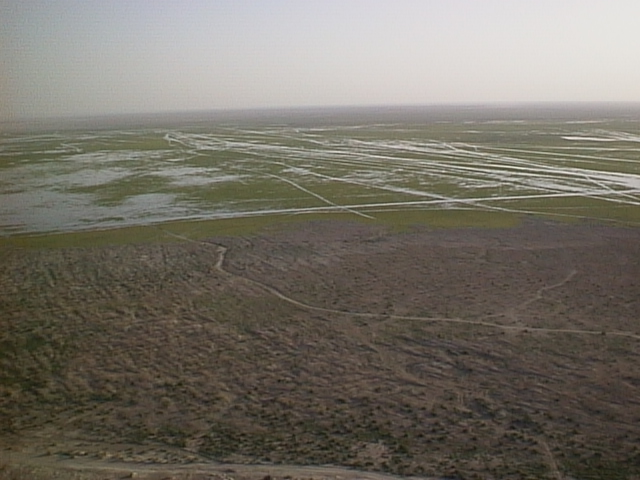

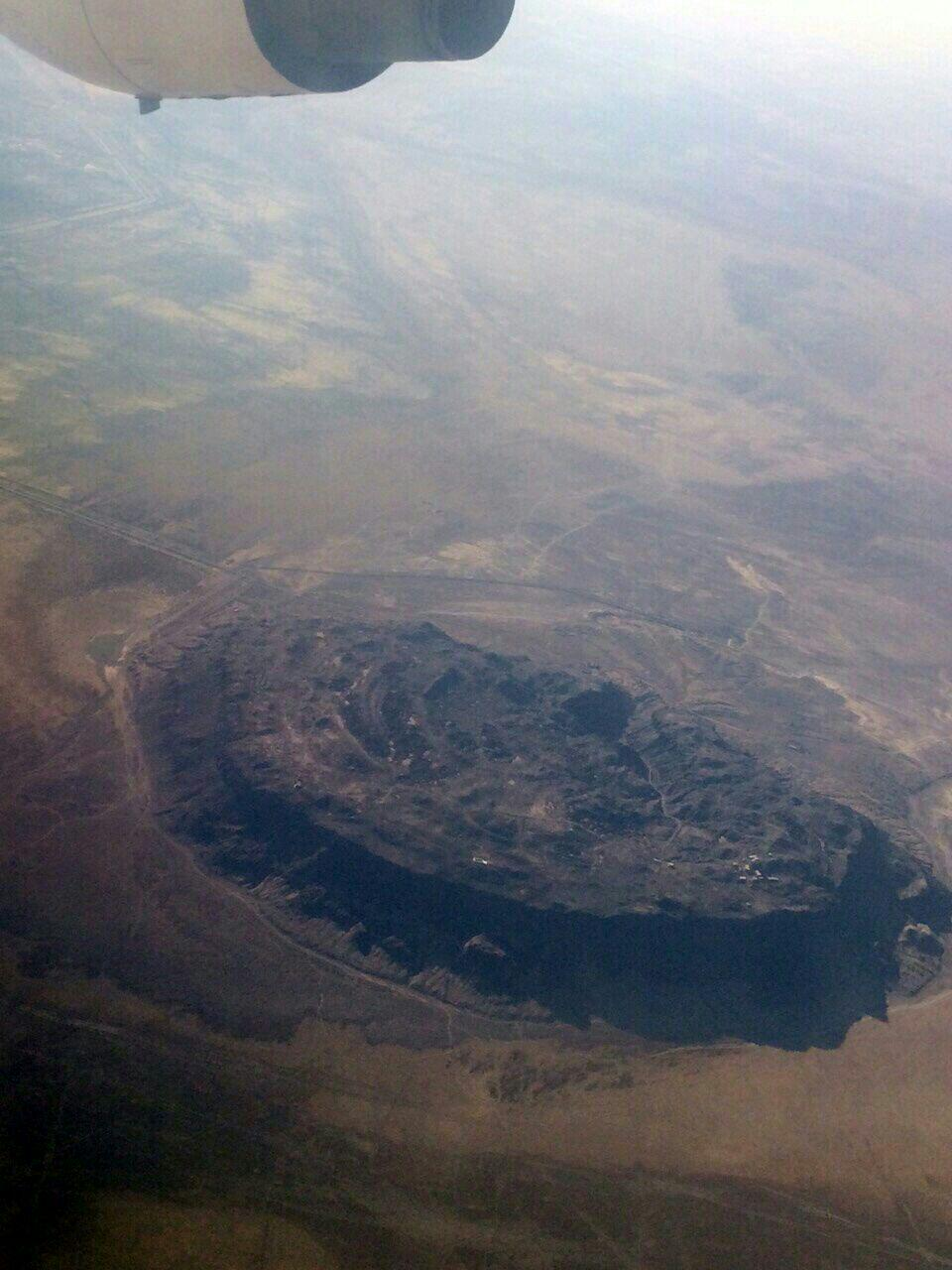

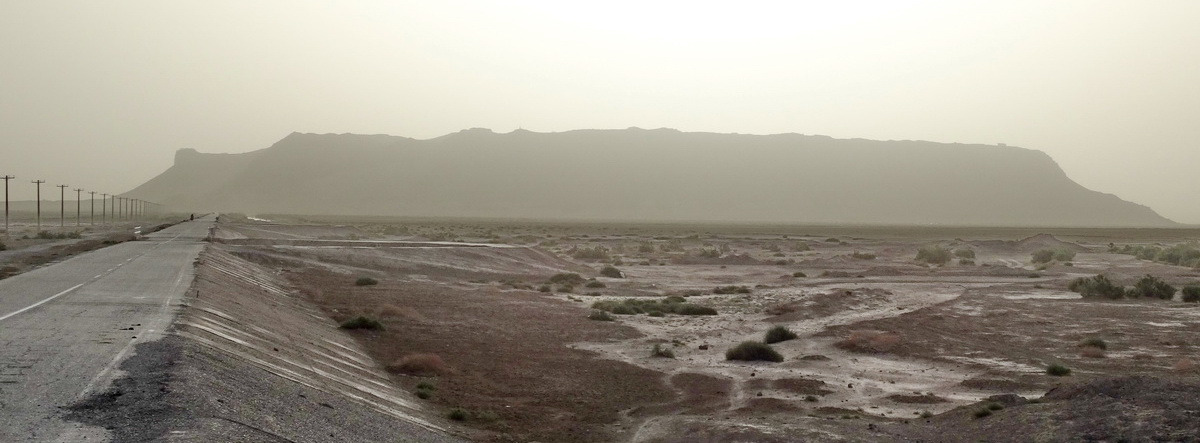

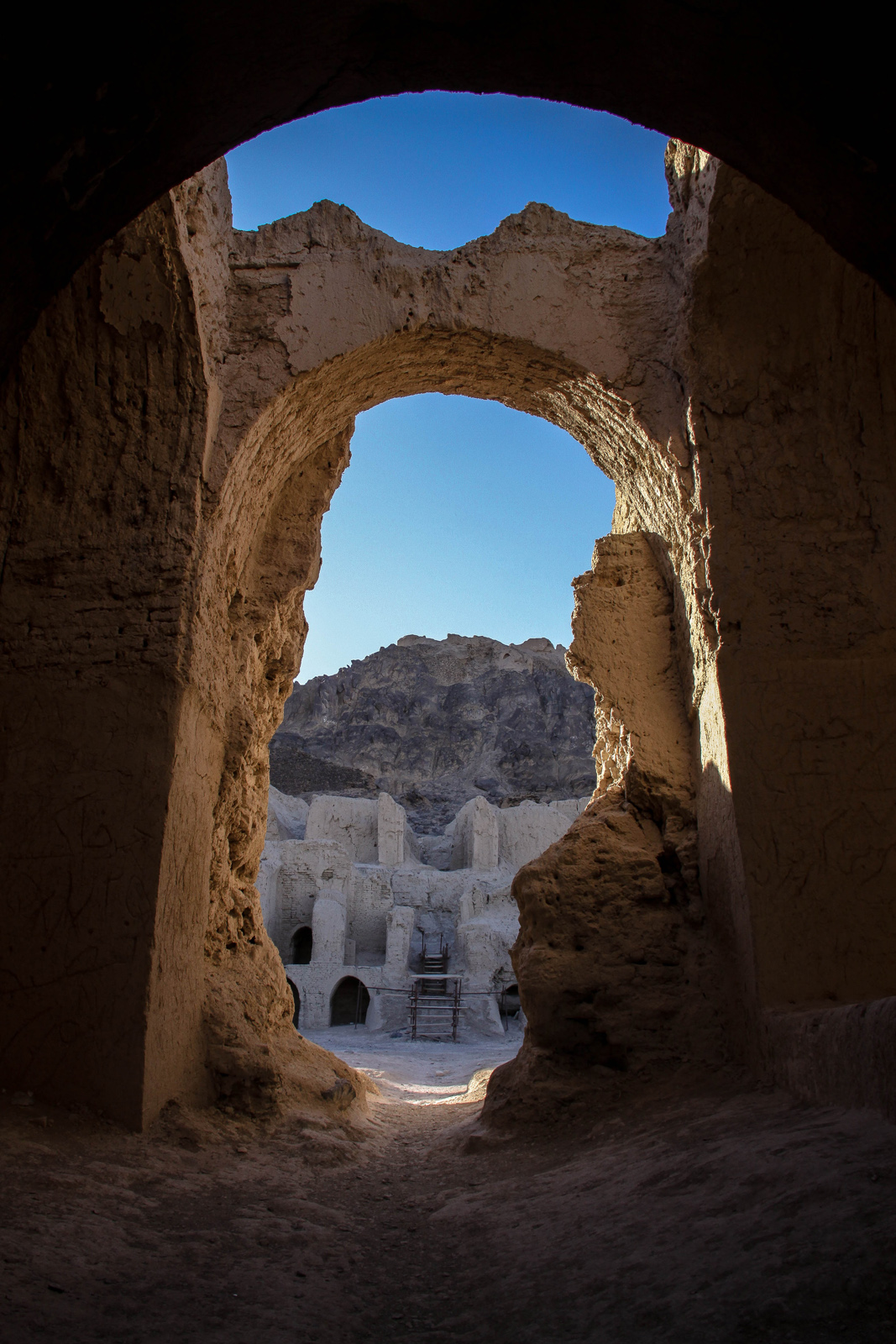

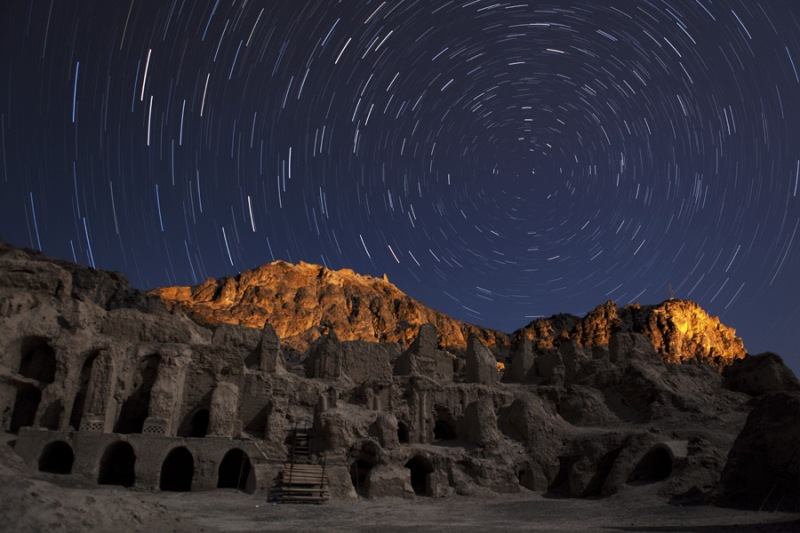

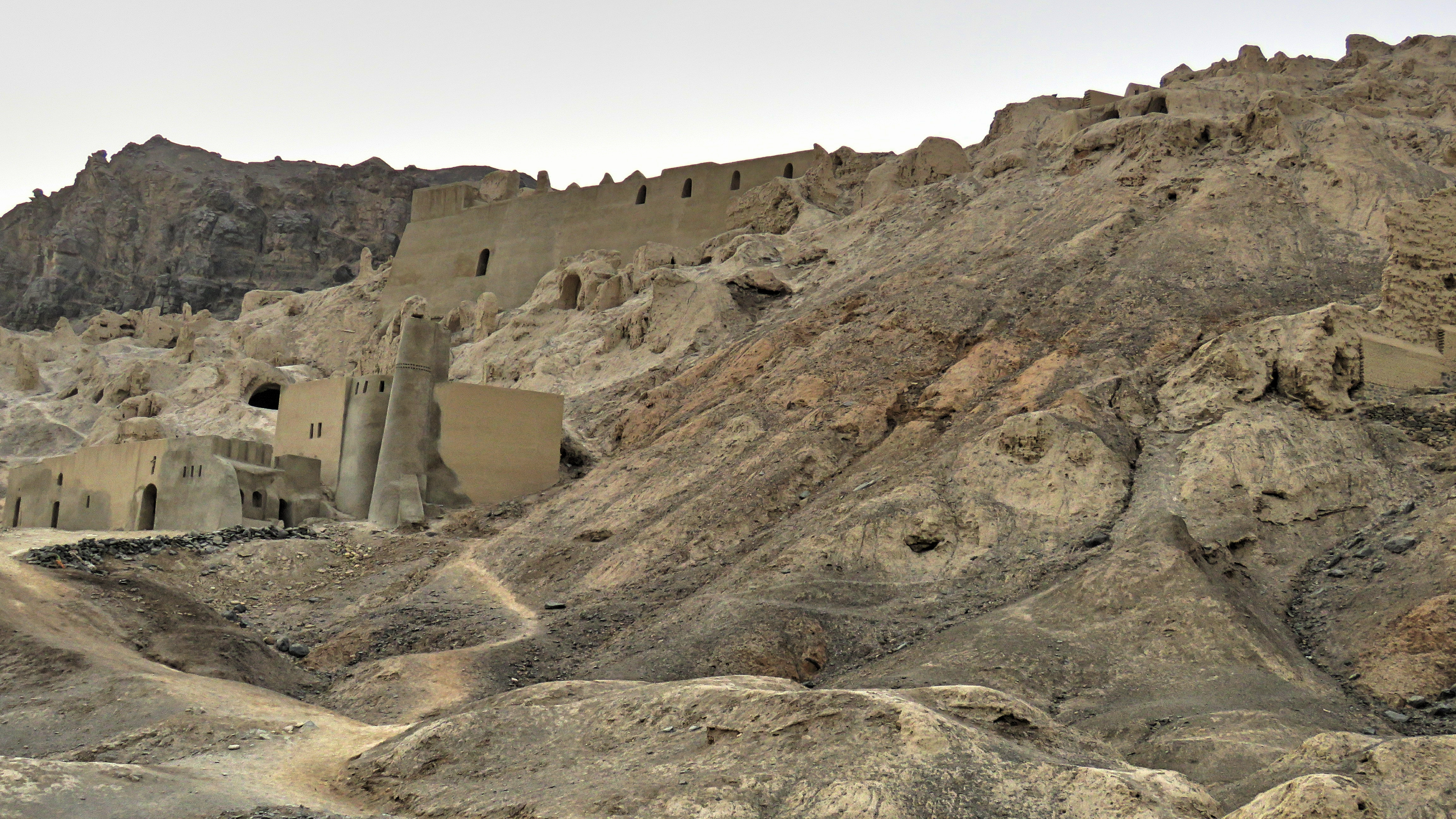

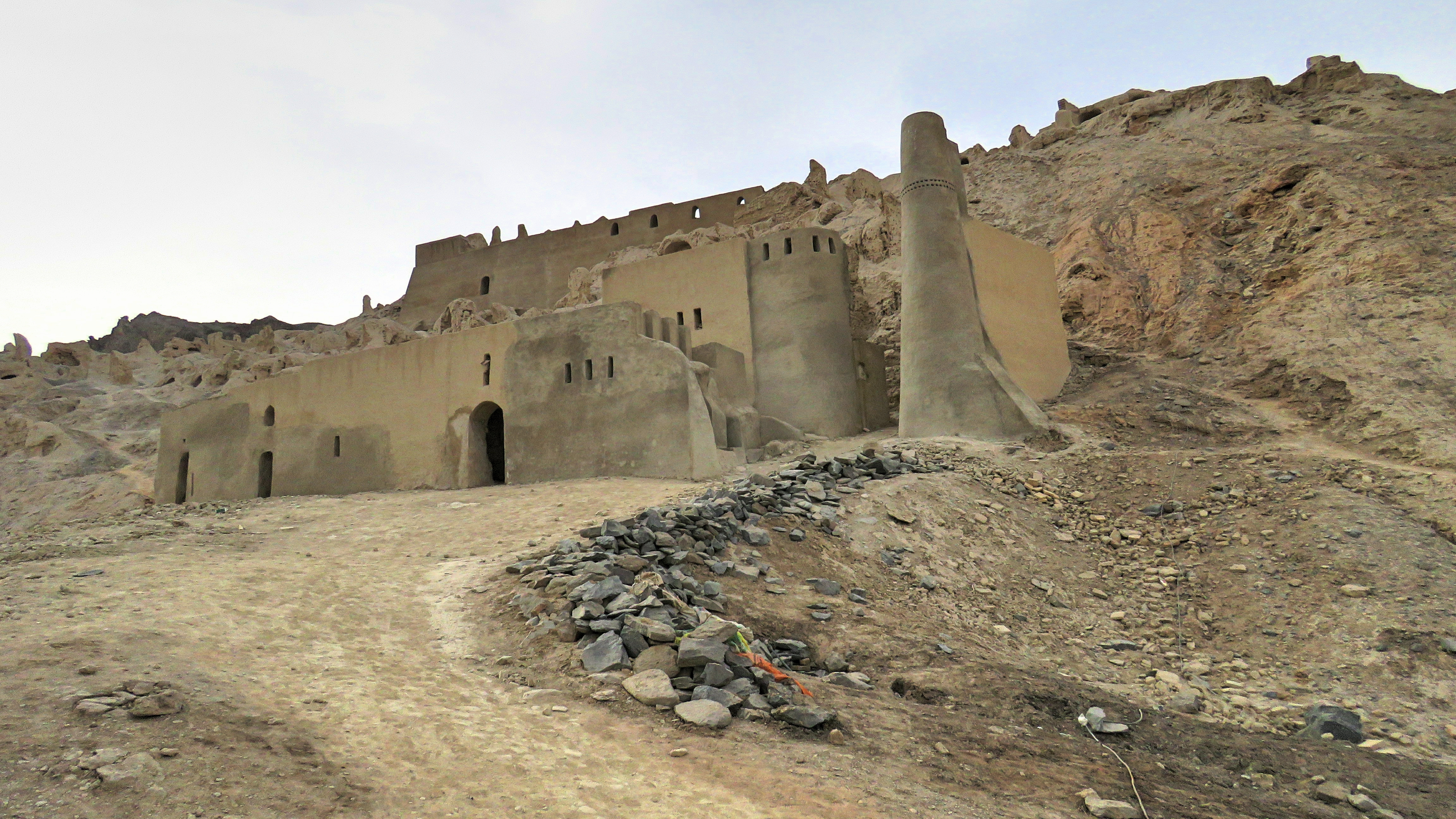

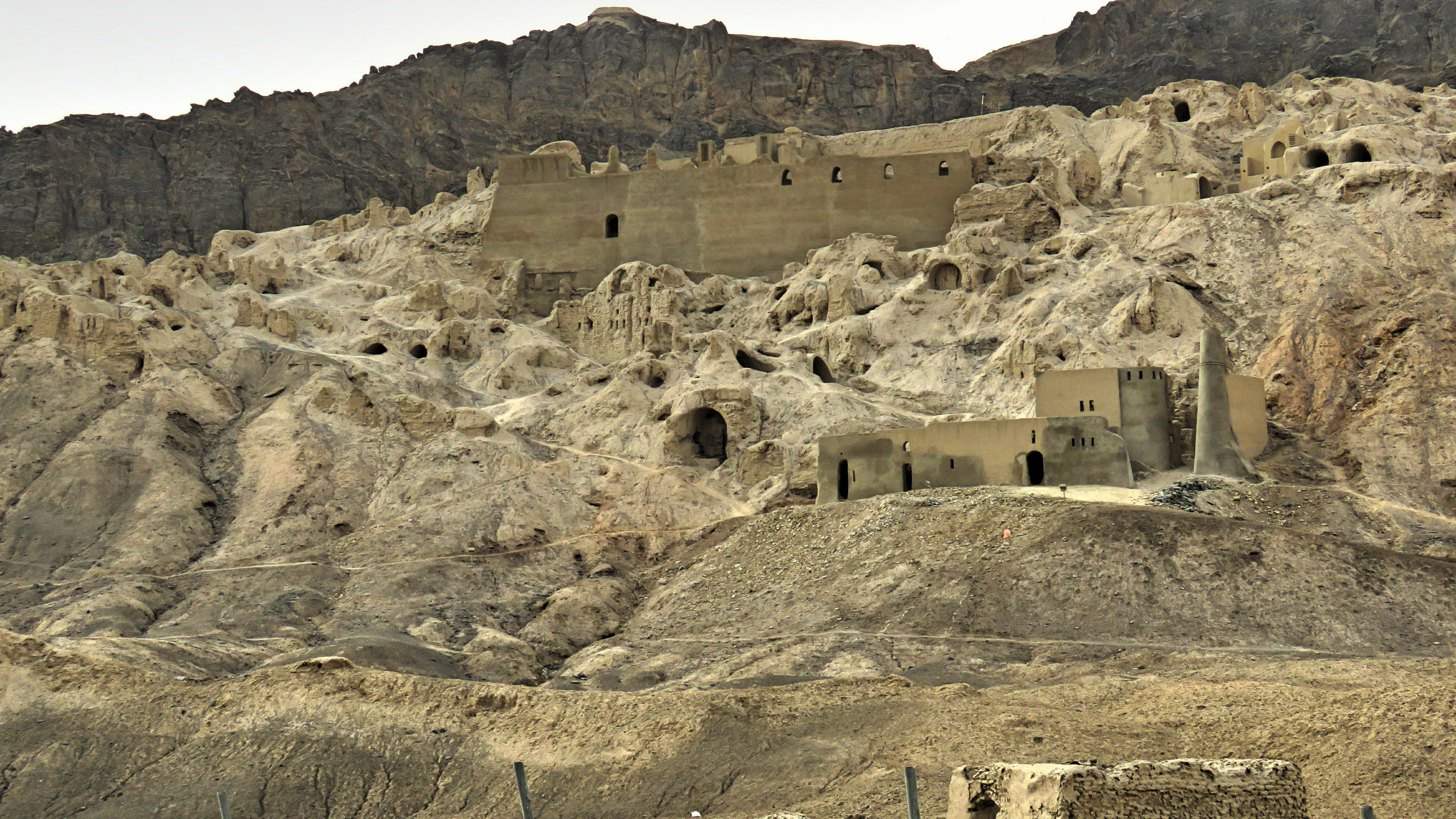

== See also ==
- Sistan Basin
- Helmand River

== Sources ==
- Keall, Edward J. "Architecture: Parthian Period". Encyclopædia Iranica. ISSN 2330-4804.
- Ramazan-nia, Nersi (February 1997). "The treasures of Lake Hamun: An Interview with Soroor Ghanimati". The Iranian. Berkeley, California: Abadan Publishing Co.
