= Zabol Medical Science University =

Coordinates: 31.036°N 61.489°E

- Established: 2005
- Faculty: 126
- Students: 2,146
- Location: Zabol، Sistan and Baluchestan province
- Website: Official website

Zabol University of Medical Science was established in 1960-61 (Anno Hegirae 1380–81). It is a coeducational, public university, located in Zabol, in the southeast of Iran. It operates under the administration of Iran's Health and Medical Education Ministry. Its programs include Medicine and Health and Science and Technology. Additional programs include Pharmacology, Toxicology and Emergency Medicine. The university enrolled slightly over 2,000 undergraduates (circa 2012, A.H. 1433).

== Health care ==
Health care workers' knowledge at the Medical Science Center is low; barely half of the HCWs at Zabol city have "acceptable" knowledge "on proper methods of blood and components transfusion."

== See also ==
- Health care in Iran
- Nursing in Iran
