= Sistan Basin =

Inland endorheic basin

Coordinates: 29°50′07″N 61°56′30″E

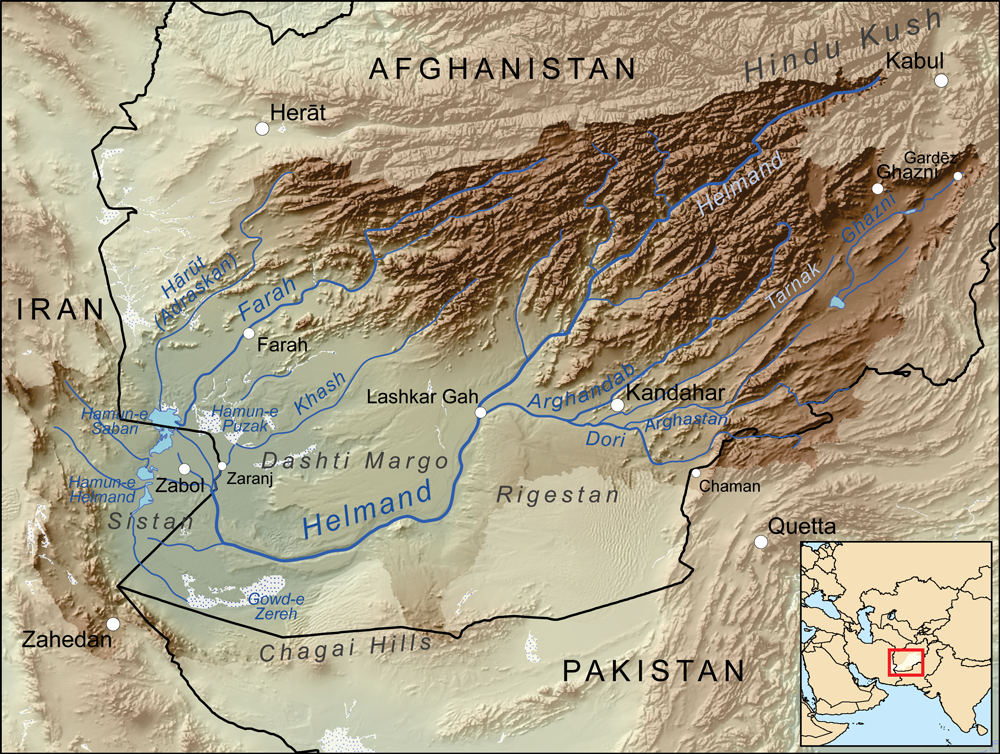
Map of the Sistan/Helmand River drainage basin

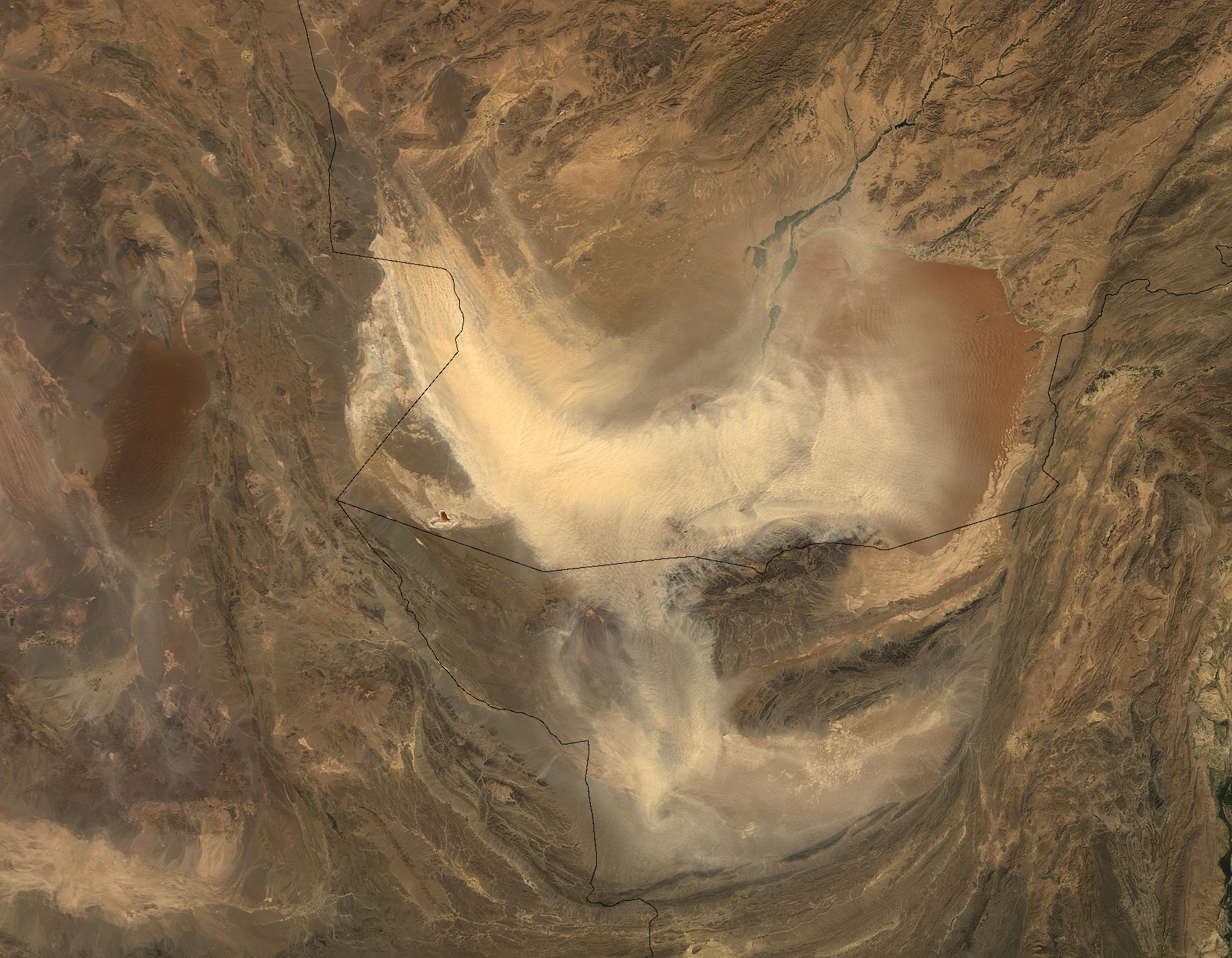
Satellite image of southern Afghanistan and Iran in dust storm

The Sistan Basin is an inland endorheic basin encompassing parts of southwestern Afghanistan and parts of southeastern Iran. It is one of the driest regions in the world and an area subject to prolonged droughts. Its watershed is a system of rivers flowing from the highlands of Afghanistan into freshwater lakes and marshes and then to its ultimate destination: Afghanistan's saline Godzareh Depression, part of the extensive Sistan terminal basin. The Helmand River drains the basin's largest watershed, fed mainly by snowmelt from the mountains of Hindu Kush, but other rivers contribute also.

A basalt hill, known as Mount Khajeh, rises beside the lakes and marshes of the basin.

== Lakes ==
The lowest part of the Sistan Basin contains a series of shallow lakes, known as hamuns. It appears that in the past there was a single Hamun Lake, but there are now three separate lakes. From north to south the lakes are:

=== Hamun-e Puzak ===
The Hamun-e Puzak lies mostly in Afghanistan. It receives water from the Shelah Charkh channel of the Helmand River, and also from the Khash River and other small rivers.

=== Hamun-e Sabari ===
The Hamun-e Sabari is split between Afghanistan and Iran. It receives water from the Parian branch of Helmand River, the Farah River and the Harut River.

=== Hamun-e Hirmand ===
The largest proportion of the Helmand River's waters flow into the Hamun-e Helmand, which is entirely in Iran, by a channel known as the Rud-e Sistan.

=== Hydrology ===
In times of flood the hamuns join into one large lake, and once every 20 years or so the floodwaters create an overflow from the Hamun-e Helmand by a normally dry river known as the Shela Rud, terminating in the Godzareh Depression. In 1885 there was an exceptional flood, and the floodwaters filled the depression for three years.

In recent years, particularly during a drought from 1998 to 2005, the hamuns have dried up completely.

== Ecological importance ==
Since the economy of the region is based on agriculture, subsistence depends on snowmelt and rainfall in the high mountains to sustain the health of the Sistan Basin and its wetlands. This source of water fluctuates severely over time and therefore has resulted in fundamental problems of survival for human settlements in the area. A severe drought began at the turn of twenty-first century and as of 2005 has lasted six years with extreme consequences for the populations.

The region's economic survival is dependent on the wetland's products. For example, beds of reeds provide livestock food, cooking and heating fuel, and the raw materials for structures and handicrafts. Water availability affects the income derived from fishing and hunting, an important source of income. The result of the drought has been the collapse of the local economy as well as destruction of the wetland's ecological system, causing damage to the agriculture in the delta based on the Helmand River's irrigation.

== Archaeology ==
For more than 5,000 years, the Sistan Basin has been inhabited by sophisticated cultures and thus contains some key archaeological sites. The Shahr-e Sukhteh, or "Burnt City", in Iran, built in 3100 B.C. near a currently dried-up branch of the Helmand River, was abandoned one thousand years later, most likely due climate changes that altered the river course.

Also, Shahdad, located further to the west, on the western side of Lut desert, is a related site from the Bronze Age.

Kang and Zaranj in Afghanistan were major medieval cultural hubs, now covered by sand. Here, signs of historical irrigation systems, including canals, are still visible in the Dasht-e Margo and Chakhansur areas while elsewhere canals are filled with silt and agricultural fields buried by shifting sand. Today the area is sparsely populated.

Excavations have also revealed a citadel complex, and the remains of a Zoroastrian fire temple, on Mount Khajeh in Zabol (other name: Sistan).

There are other important sites in this area.

- Dahan-e Gholaman is a major Achaemenid archaeological site. It is believed to be the capital of the ancient satrapy of Zranka/Drangiana.
- Ram Shahristan (or Abrashariyar) was an ancient capital of Sistan.

== See also ==
- Arachosia
- Bahram III
