= Godzareh Depression =

Lake in Afghanistan

Coordinates: 29°50′07″N 61°56′30″E

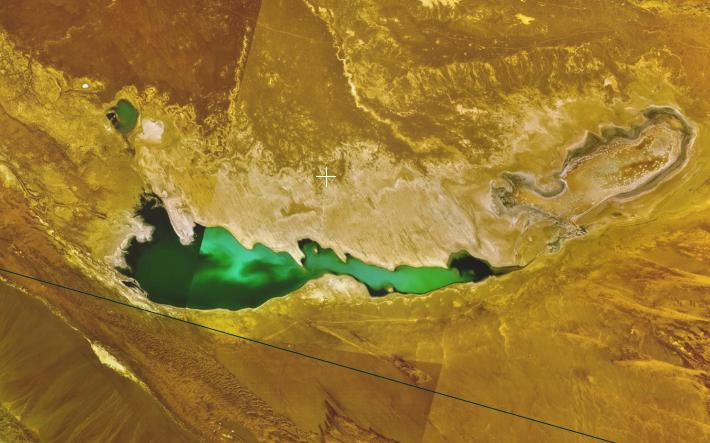
Satellite image of the Godzareh depression in southwestern Afghanistan

The Gowd-i zerrah, i.e., Zerrah Depression (Persian for "lake depression") is the lowest part of an inland drainage basin covering large parts of southern Afghanistan and Iran known as the Sistan Basin. The Sistan Basin is an endorheic basin and encompasses a complex system of rivers, shallow lakes, marshes, and wetlands as its watershed, draining into the Hamun Lakes in southeastern Iran. Occasional outflows from these lakes are carried back into Afghanistan by the seasonal Shile River to the basin's terminus, the Godzareh depression in Afghanistan. The depression is flat and very shallow with fine-textured sediment at its lowest portions. The lowest section of the Godzareh depression is 467 m above sea level. The depression only receives runoff water when the main tributaries are overflowing every 10 years on average.

In general, a geological depression is a landform that is sunken or lower than the surrounding area. The Godzareh depression is the lowest point in the Sistan Basin in Afghanistan and therefore is the terminus to which all the water flows.

== Water supply obligations ==
Under an accord signed between Iran and Afghanistan in 1972, Afghanistan is obliged to release water at a rate of at least 910 cubic feet per second (26 m^{3}/s). The Helmand River water agreement was signed in 1972 between Mohammad Musa Shafiq and Amir-Abbas Hoveyda, the then prime ministers of the country and Iran. The Taliban briefly stopped the flow of water to Iran when the latter threatened to attack in retaliation for the killing of Iranians who were claimed to be diplomats in Mazari Sharif when the Taliban retook the city from the Northern Alliance the second time in 1998. During that time, the Helmand Valley was experiencing a five-year drought.

To make good on its threat, the Taliban diverted the entire flow of the Helmand River southward through a canal into the Gowd Zerrah/Zerah Depression (also known as the Godzareh Depression). While the Zerah filled up with Helmand waters and uselessly, Iran's famous Hamun-e Helmand lake dried up, as did other regional pastures, leading to the death of flora, fauna, cattle, and birds in the Sistan and Baluchestan Province of Iran.

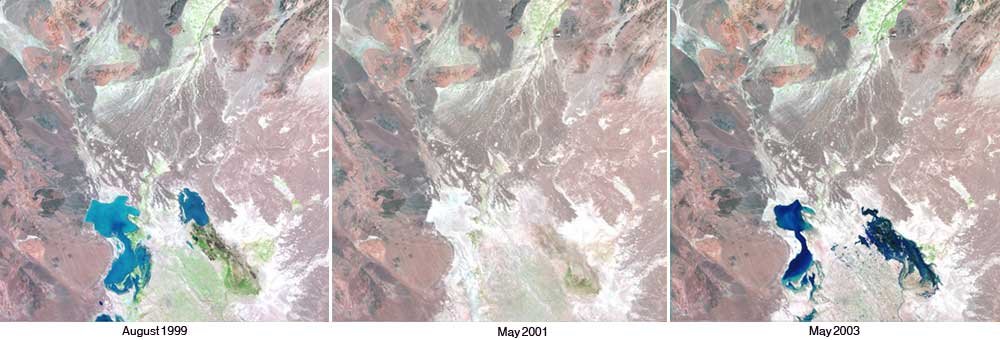
Time Series of Water in Lake Hamoun, Iran/Afghanistan

. Satellite photos taken at the time show the changes this caused.

== See also ==
- Afar Triangle
- Depression (geology)
- Endorheic basin
- Hamun
