= Zabol =

City in Sistan and Baluchestan province, Iran

Zabol Persian: زابل Zābul
- City
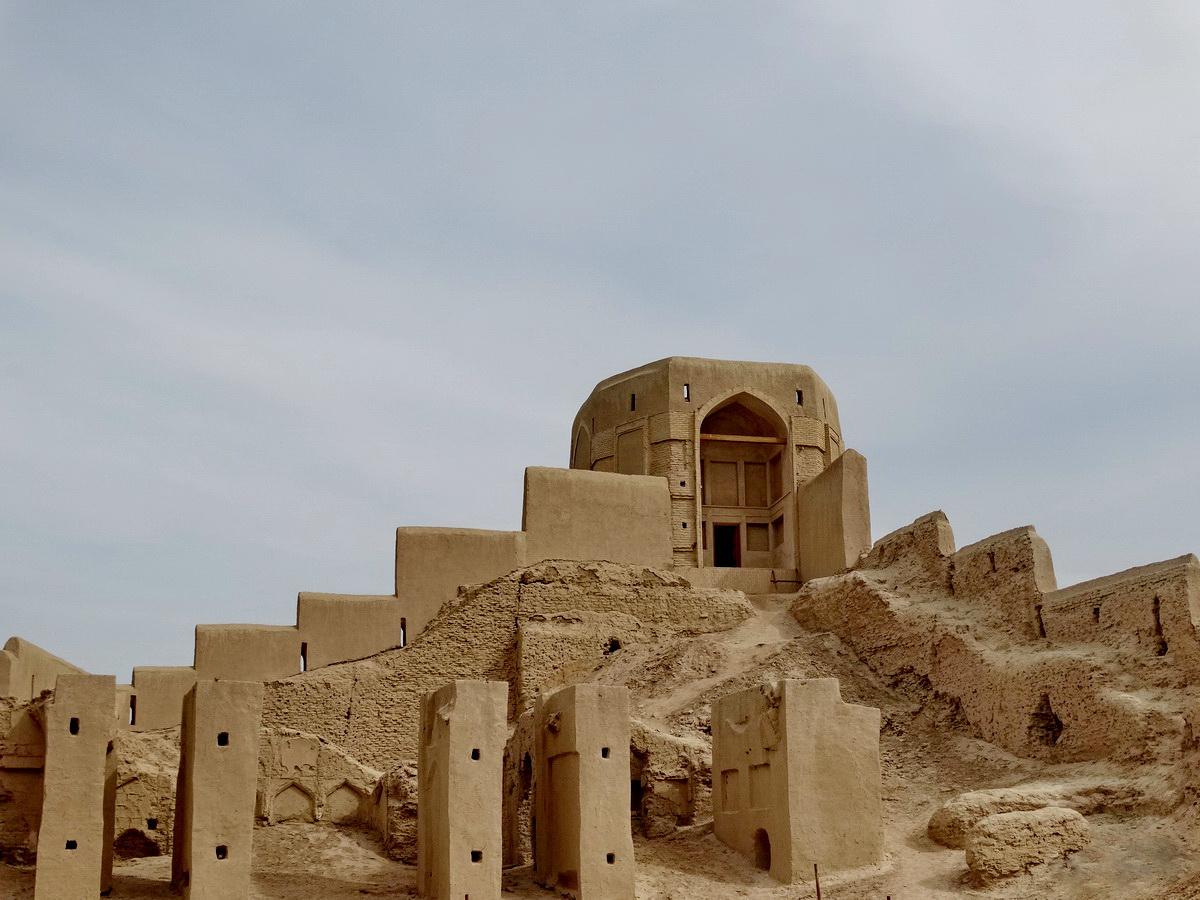

- Location within Iran Location within West and Central Asia
- Coordinates: 31°02′02″N 61°29′16″E
- Country: Iran
- Province: Sistan and Baluchestan
- County: Zabol
- District: Central

Population (2016)
  - Urban: 134,950
- Time zone: UTC+3:30 (IRST)

Zabol (Persian: زابل, Persian: [zɒːbol]) (Note: Also romanized as Zâbol; also known as Zābul. Referred to as Sistan until the late 1920s, the city was renamed Zabol by Reza Shah Pahlavi) is a city in the Central District of Zabol County, Sistan and Baluchestan province, Iran, serving as capital of both the county and the district. Zabol is near the border with Afghanistan.

== Demographics ==
=== Language and ethnicity ===
The people of Zabol are a mix of Persians who speak a variant of the Persian language known as Sistani or Seistani, and a small minority of Baloch who speak Balochi, a Northwestern Iranian language.

=== Population ===
At the time of the 2006 National Census, the city's population was 130,642 in 27,867 households. The 2011 census counted 137,722 people in 33,957 households. The 2016 census measured the population of the city as 134,950 people in 35,401 households.

== Geography ==
=== Location ===
Zabol is located near Lake Hamun, in the endorheic Sīstān Basin, and the region is irrigated by the Helmand River. Lake Hamun is a seasonal lake that is often dry.

Zabol is connected by road to Milak and Zaranj (across the border in Afghanistan). The Delaram-Zaranj Highway provides road connectivity to the rest of Afghanistan. Zabol thus provides Afghanistan access to the Arabian Sea and Persian Gulf via the Port of Chabahar. Zabol has a regional airport.

=== Air pollution ===
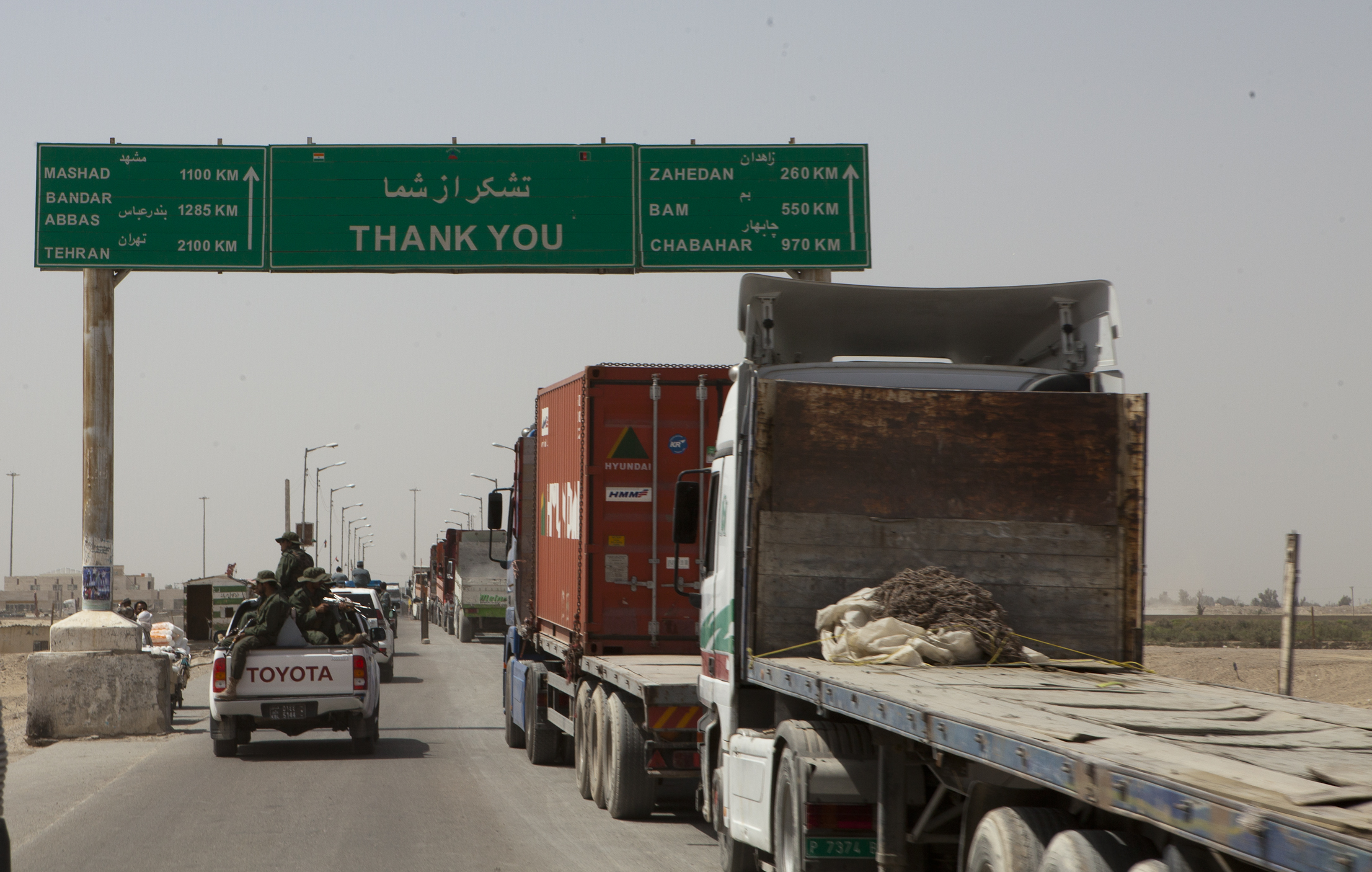
Trucks wait to cross into Iran at the Zaranj border crossing.

The Zabol area is well known for its "120-day wind" (bād-e sad-o-bist-roz), a highly persistent dust storm in the summer which blows from north to south. The disappearance in the 2000s of the nearby Hamoun wetlands has exacerbated the dusty conditions in Zabol, leading the World Health Organization to name Zabol the most polluted city in the world in 2016. A 2017 study in the journal Preventive Medicine suggested that the harm from 30 minutes of cycling outdoors in Zabol's polluted air would outweigh the benefits of the exercise.

=== Climate ===
Zabol has a hot desert climate (Köppen climate classification BWh).

Climate data for Zabol (normals 1991-2020, extremes 1962–present)
Month	Jan	Feb	Mar	Apr	May	Jun	Jul	Aug	Sep	Oct	Nov	Dec	Year
Record high °C (°F)	29.0 (84.2)	32.8 (91.0)	42.3 (108.1)	45.9 (114.6)	49.6 (121.3)	50.8 (123.4)	49.8 (121.6)	51.0 (123.8)	46.8 (116.2)	42.6 (108.7)	37.6 (99.7)	29.0 (84.2)	51.0 (123.8)
Mean daily maximum °C (°F)	15.9 (60.6)	19.4 (66.9)	25.4 (77.7)	32.3 (90.1)	37.5 (99.5)	41.3 (106.3)	42.5 (108.5)	40.8 (105.4)	36.9 (98.4)	31.0 (87.8)	23.4 (74.1)	17.6 (63.7)	30.3 (86.6)
Daily mean °C (°F)	8.5 (47.3)	11.6 (52.9)	17.3 (63.1)	23.9 (75.0)	29.5 (85.1)	33.6 (92.5)	35.3 (95.5)	33.6 (92.5)	28.9 (84.0)	22.3 (72.1)	15.0 (59.0)	9.7 (49.5)	22.4 (72.4)
Mean daily minimum °C (°F)	2.1 (35.8)	4.8 (40.6)	9.9 (49.8)	16.1 (61.0)	21.7 (71.1)	26.2 (79.2)	28.7 (83.7)	27.2 (81.0)	21.7 (71.1)	14.7 (58.5)	7.9 (46.2)	3.0 (37.4)	15.3 (59.6)
Record low °C (°F)	−12.0 (10.4)	−9.0 (15.8)	−2.2 (28.0)	3.0 (37.4)	7.2 (45.0)	14.0 (57.2)	19.0 (66.2)	12.0 (53.6)	6.0 (42.8)	0.0 (32.0)	−4.0 (24.8)	−10.0 (14.0)	−12.0 (10.4)
Average precipitation mm (inches)	12.5 (0.49)	9.9 (0.39)	14.8 (0.58)	4.6 (0.18)	1.2 (0.05)	0.1 (0.00)	0.0 (0.0)	0.0 (0.0)	0.0 (0.0)	0.3 (0.01)	2.2 (0.09)	5.7 (0.22)	51.3 (2.01)
Average snowfall cm (inches)	0.4 (0.2)	0.1 (0.0)	0.0 (0.0)	0.0 (0.0)	0.0 (0.0)	0.0 (0.0)	0.0 (0.0)	0.0 (0.0)	0.0 (0.0)	0.0 (0.0)	0.0 (0.0)	0.0 (0.0)	0.5 (0.2)
Average precipitation days (≥ 1.0 mm)	2.2	2.0	2.8	1.1	0.4	0.0	0.0	0.0	0.0	0.1	0.8	1.1	10.5
Average snowy days	0.2	0	0	0	0	0	0	0	0	0	0	0	0.2
Average relative humidity (%)	50	45	42	35	27	22	19	19	20	27	39	47	33
Average dew point °C (°F)	−1.5 (29.3)	−0.2 (31.6)	3.4 (38.1)	6.9 (44.4)	7.7 (45.9)	8.3 (46.9)	8.4 (47.1)	6.3 (43.3)	2.9 (37.2)	1.9 (35.4)	0.6 (33.1)	−1.5 (29.3)	3.6 (38.5)
Mean monthly sunshine hours	211	209	232	265	314	327	334	326	303	291	240	218	3,270
Mean daily daylight hours	10.4	11.1	12	12.9	13.7	14.1	13.9	13.2	12.3	11.4	10.6	10.2	12.1
Average ultraviolet index	4	5	6	7	9	9	9	8	7	6	5	3	7
Source 1: NOAA NCEI (snowfall and snow/sleet days for 1981-2010)
Source 2: Iran Meteorological Organization (records) Weather Atlas (UV index and daylight hours), Ogimet (April record high)

== Colleges and universities ==
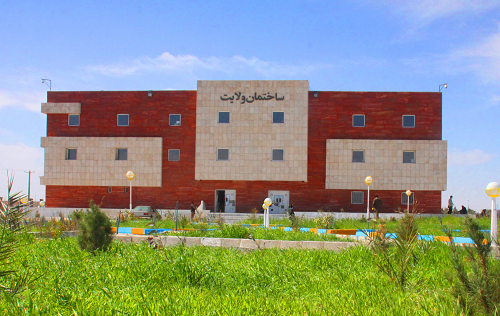
Presidential Building of Zabol University

The city is home to Zabol University, the largest university in the city, as well as the Zabol Medical Science University and the Sistan Museum of Anthropology.

- Islamic Azad university, Zabol Branch
- Payame-noor university of Zabol

== See also ==
Media related to Zabol at Wikimedia Commons
