= Dahan-e Gholaman =

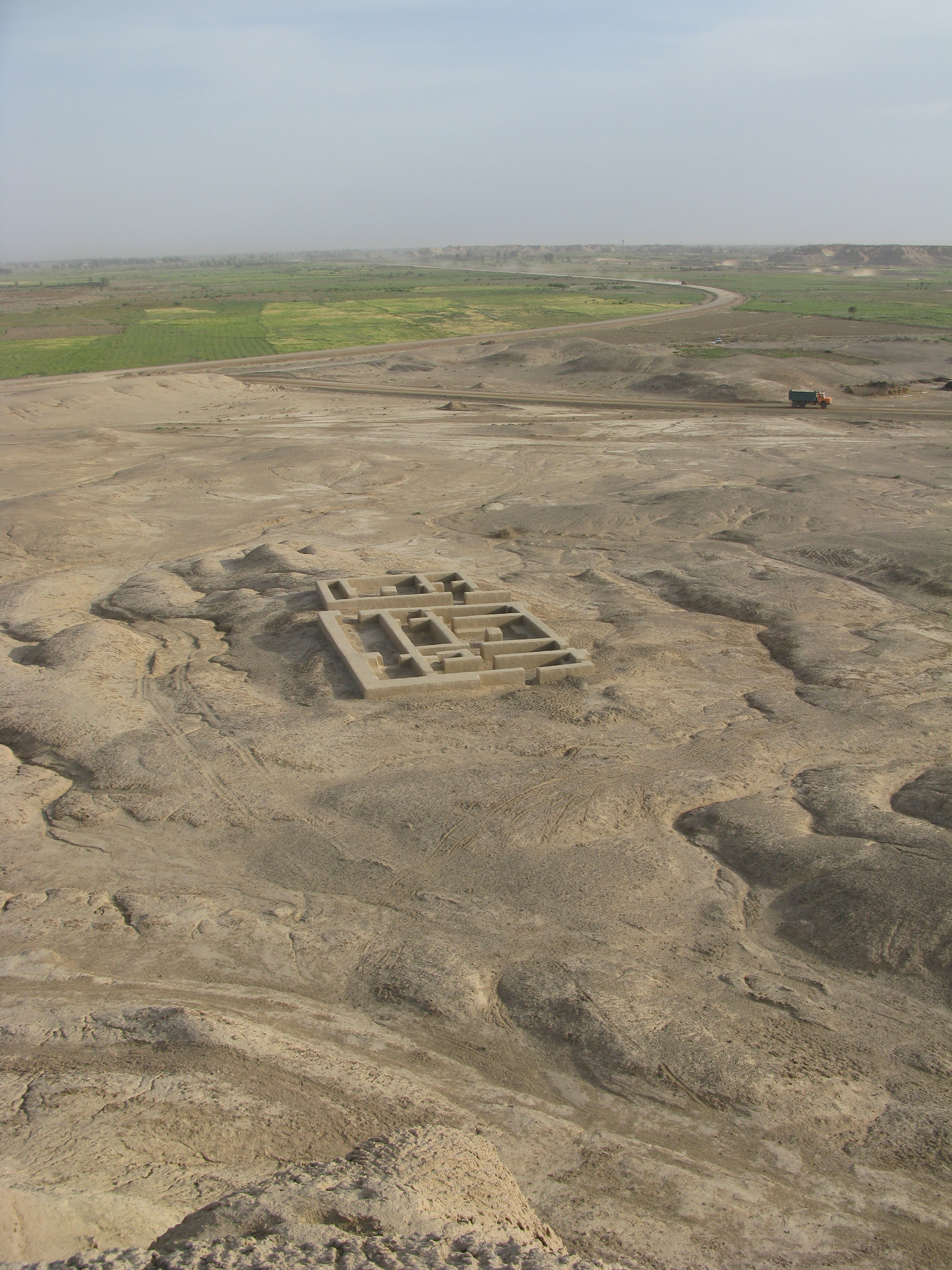

- Location within Iran
- 30°47′26″N 61°38′11″E

Iran National Heritage List
- Official name: Dahan-e Gholaman
- Type: Ruins
- Designated: 1931
- Reference no.: 55
- Conservation organization: Cultural Heritage, Handicrafts and Tourism Organization of Iran

Dahan-e Gholaman (Dahan-i Ġulāmān, Persian: دهان غلامان) or Dahaneh-e Gholaman (Dahāneh-ye Qolāmān, Persian: دهانه غلامان) is the modern name of a major Achaemenid archeological site in eastern Iran. It has been identified as Zranka/Zarin, the capital of the satrapy of Zranka/Drangiana.

== Geography ==
The archeological site known as Dahan-e Gholaman or Dahaneh-e Gholaman ("Gateway of the Slaves") is located some 30 km southeast of the modern city of Zabol on a neck of land separating two of the modern Chah Nimeh reservoirs, about 8.5 km from the nearest point on the Iran-Afghanistan border.

== Archeology ==
Dahan-e Gholaman is the largest Achaemenid site in all of eastern Iran. Some 27 structures aligned roughly in a straight line running SW to NE along the northern edge of the site were excavated by the Italian archeologist U. Scerrato in 1962–1965 and by the Iranian archeologist S. M. S. Sajjadi in 2000–2005. Further geophysical and surface exploration in 2007–2011 revealed the outline of another monumental building situated 2 km south of the northern complex of buildings. Several of the larger structures excavated or detected at Dahan-e Gholaman have regular rectangular or square plans and bear comparison with the palatial buildings and audience halls of the Achaemenid royal residences at Pasargadae and Persepolis, as well as Dasht-e Gohar. One of the structures has been identified as a religious building, its three altars possibly dedicated to the leading Persian gods Ahura Mazda, Anahita, and Mithra. Other structures are identified as having administrative, public, and industrial functions.

=== Architecture ===
The architecture of the city is a blend of Achaemenid as well as local traditions which aligns with the climate of the Sistan, including the orientation of the building and positioning of the entrances (aligned against the so-called 120-day-long winds in Northwest-Southeast direction prevailing in eastern Iran), the use of a central courtyard, and the use of local materials (notably adobe instead of brick, wood, or stone), and the use of vaulted and arched covers in roofs as opposd to flat roofs)

== Identification and History ==
The size of the site, unparalleled in eastern Iran, and the characteristic layout of its public structures indicate that it served as a significant Achaemenid administrative center. Consequently, Dahan-e Gholaman has been identified as the capital of the Achaemenid province of Zranka/Drangiana. As such, the site's ancient name was also probably Zranka or, a variation, Zarin. The site's features exhibit parallels to those attested in the reign of Darius I (r. 522–486 BC), which would match the expected overall time-frame for its construction.

The absence of stratigraphy at the site suggests a relatively short period of urban habitation, and it probably did not survive much beyond the Achaemenid period (c. 550–330 BC). In particular, if the identification with the capital of Zranka/Drangiana is correct, the site would have been visited by Alexander the Great during his pursuit of the usurper Bessos and his conquest of the region in the winter of 330–329 BC. After the decline and abandonment of Dahan-e Gholaman, the administrative center of the region was transferred 31 km to the northeast, to Nād-i `Alī in what is now Afghanistan, which was called Zaranj (or Zarang) in the Middle Ages. The name has since been transferred, yet again, to the modern city of Zaranj in Afghanistan, located 4.4 km south of medieval Zaranj (Nād-i `Alī) and 28 km northeast of ancient Zranka (Dahan-e Gholaman).

== Gallery ==
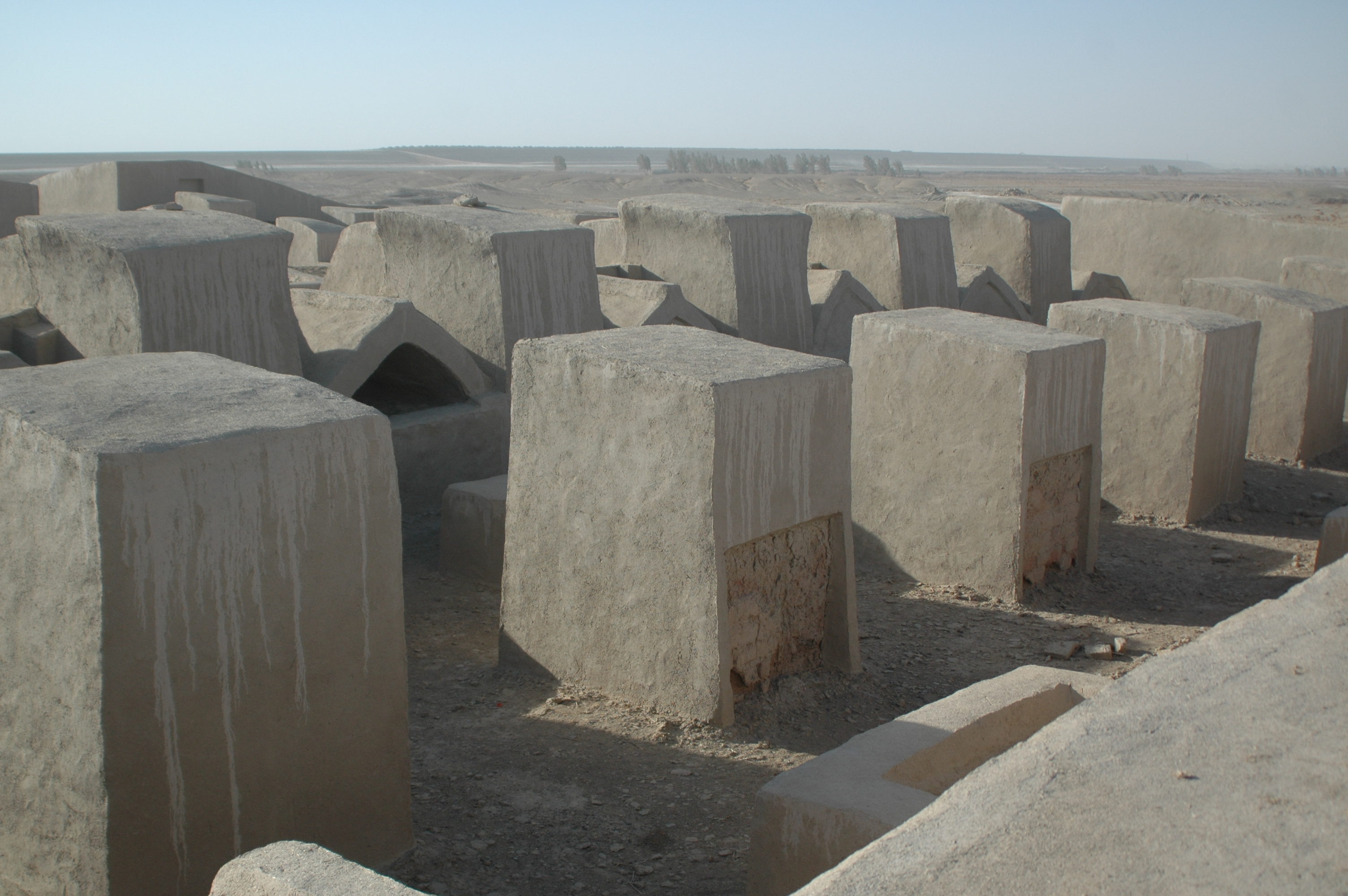

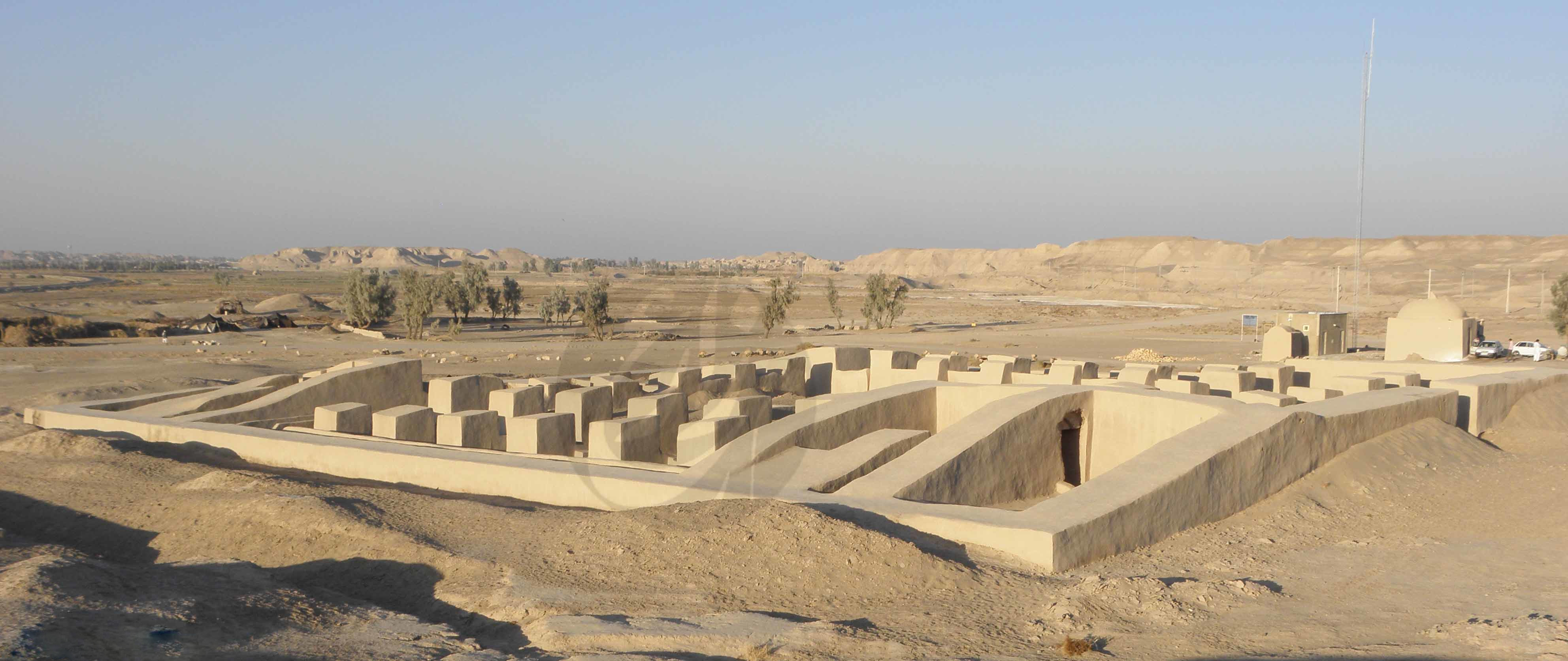

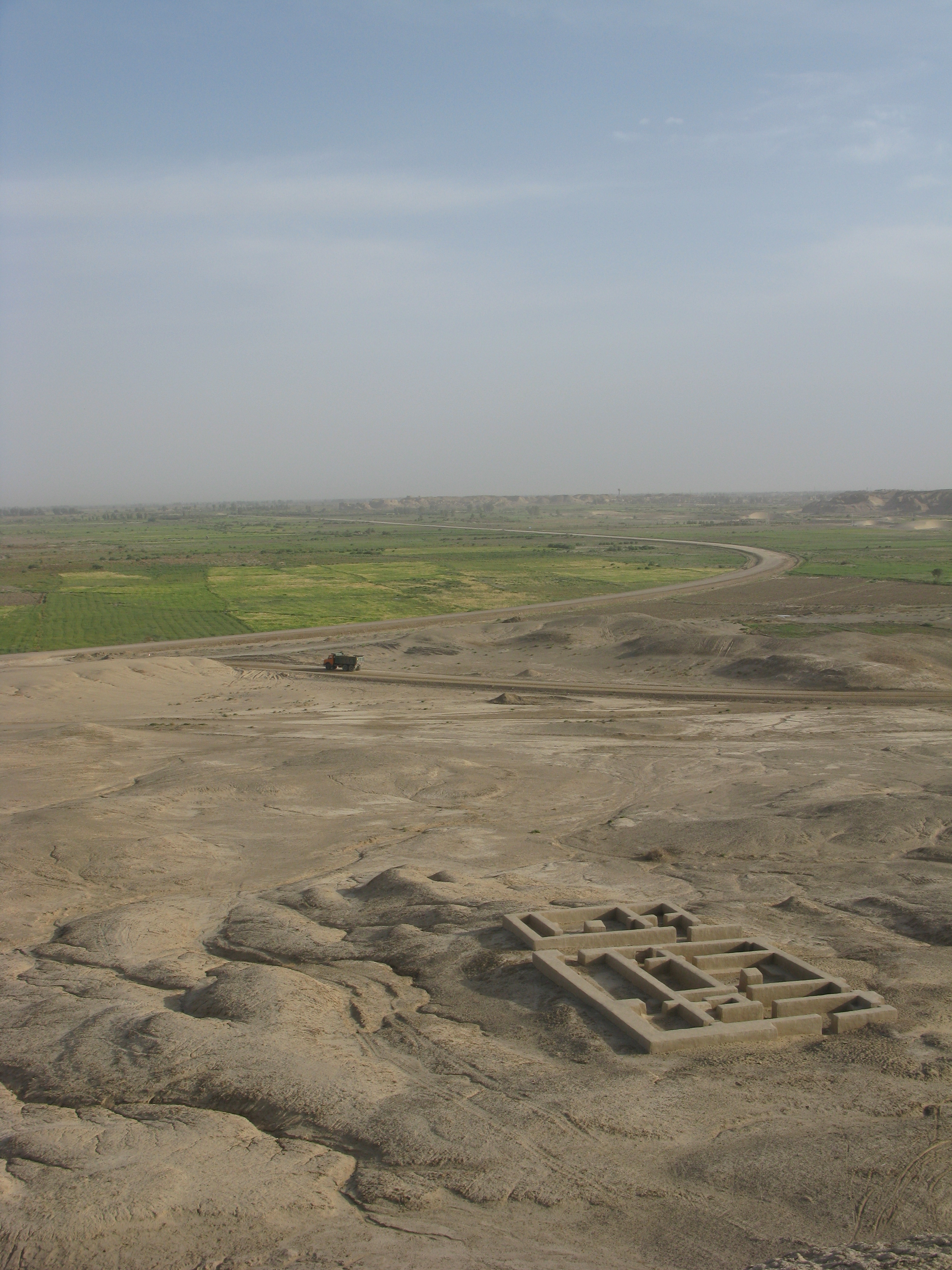

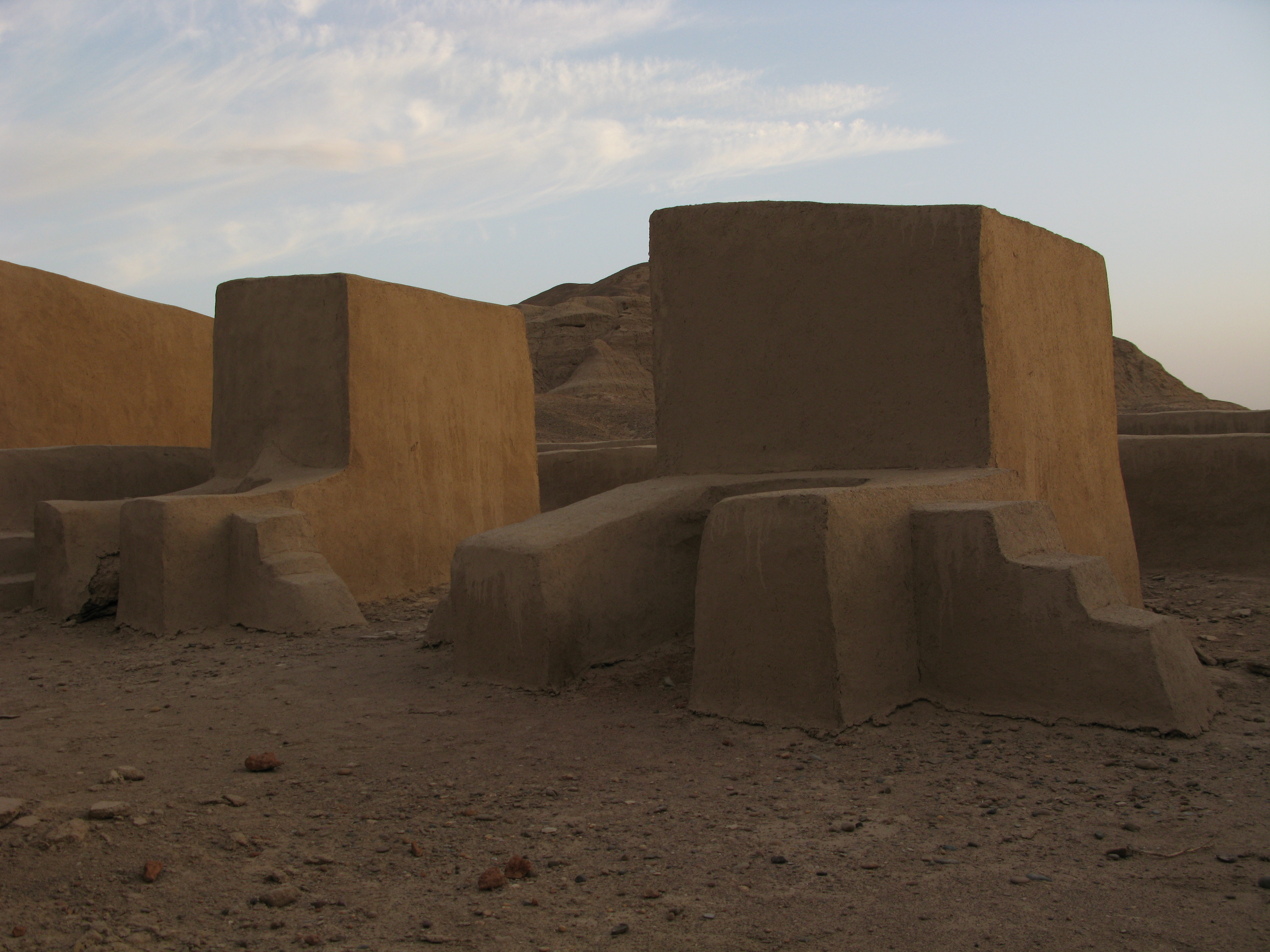

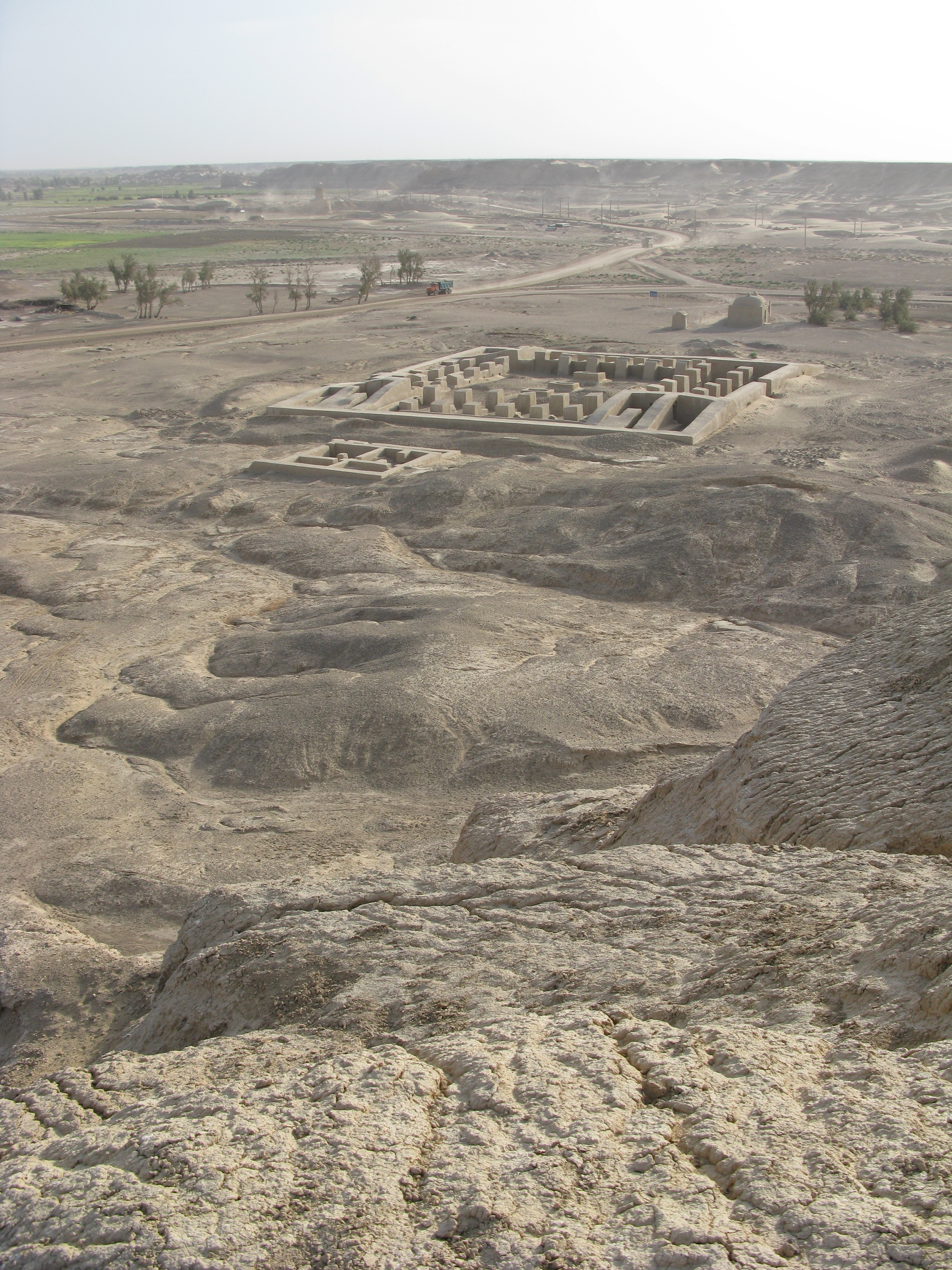

== See also ==
- Sistan Basin

== Bibliography ==
- Gnoli, G., "Dahan-e Ḡolāmān," in Encyclopaedia Iranica, vol. 6 (1993), 582–585.
- Mohammadkhani, K., "Une nouvelle construction monumentale achéménide à Dahaneh-e Gholaman, Sistan, Iran," Arta (2012.1) 1–18.
- Scerrato, U., "Excavations at Dahaneh-e Gholaman (Sistan-Iran), First Preliminary Report (1962–1963)," East and West, n.s. 16 (1966) 9–30.
- Schmitt, R., "Drangiana," in Encyclopaedia Iranica, vol. 7 (1995) 534–537.
- Talbert, R. J. A., Barrington Atlas of the Greek and Roman World, Princeton 2000.
