= Harut River =

Harut River Adraskan River
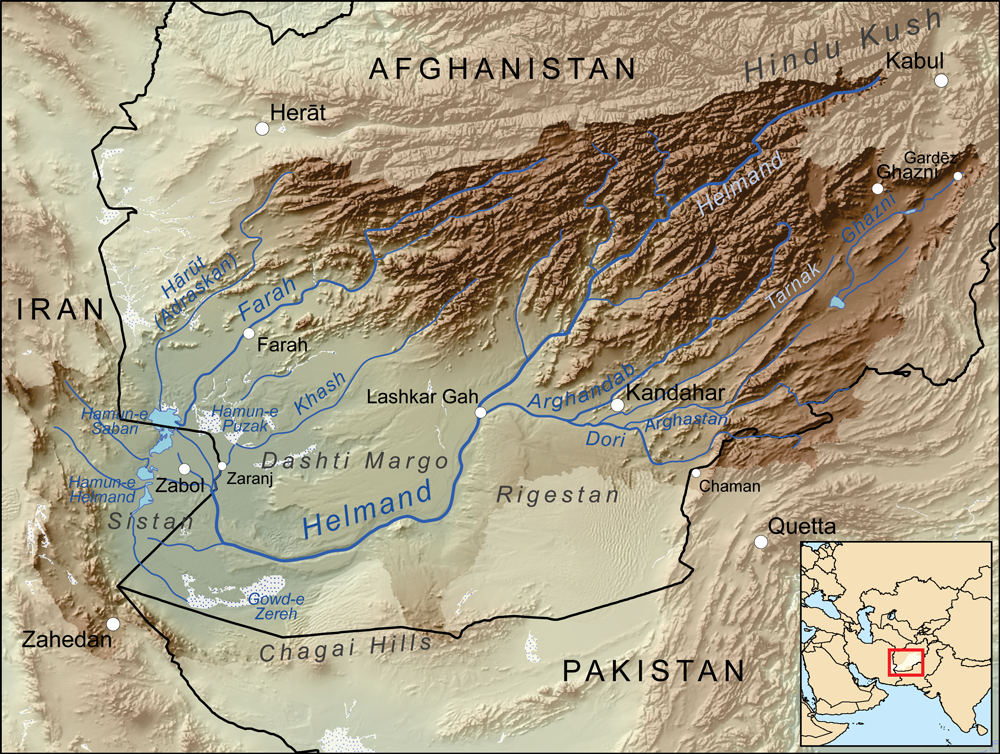
- Native name: هاروت رود (Pashto)

Location
- Country: Afghanistan

Physical characteristics
- Source
  - location: Sia koh mountains
- Mouth
  - location: Hamun Lake
- Length: 394 km (245 mi)
- Basin size: Sistan Basin

The Harut River or Adraskan River is a river of Afghanistan which belongs to the Sistan Basin. The source of the river lies in the mountains to the southeast of Herat. The river flows for about 394 kilometres (245 mi) into the Hamun Lake. Along its course are various canals for irrigation, particularly in the plains of Sabzvar and Anardarah. The Khushkek River enters the Harut.
