= Zabol University =

Coordinates: 35.6004°N 53.4367°E

University of Zabol (UOZ)
- دانشگاه زابل
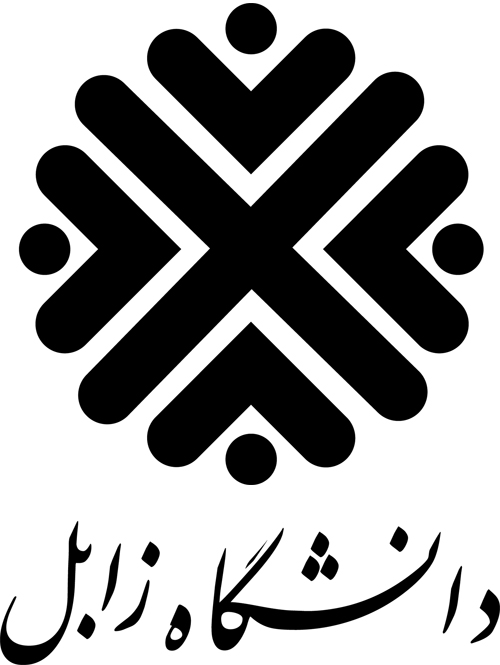
- Type: Public
- Established: 1999
- Chancellor: Peyman Afrasyab
- Faculty: 396
- Administrative staff: 850
- Students: 15,000
- Location: Zabol, Sistan and Baluchestan, Iran
- Campus: Urban
- Website: uoz.ac.ir

The University of Zabol (Persian: دانشگاه زابل, Danushgah-e Zabel), also known as Zabol University and UOZ, is a university based in Zabol, Iran, established in 1999.

== Overview ==
UOZ consists of eight faculties and a research complex including three institutes and one research center. The university has c. 15,000 students and 396 full-time faculty members, and offers 110 majors and minors, with courses leading to Bachelor's and Master's degrees, post-diploma programs and PhDs. Furthermore, this university consists of the educational-research complex of Baqiyatallah Azam (Chahnime) in 8000 hectares, laboratories, and an internet center.

Physical space limitation has remained to be one of the main problems of the university from the time it was established and has affected university activities.

== Faculties ==
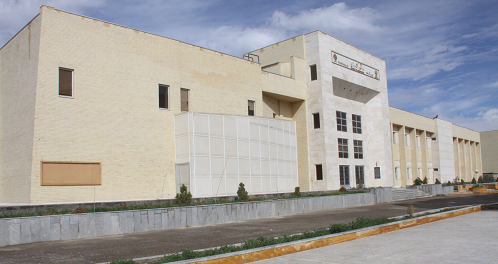
Faculty Of Agriculture. In 1990, this college due to the great need in the region, was converted to the Faculty, and students were accepted at the undergraduate level of animal sciences and agriculture in 1991.

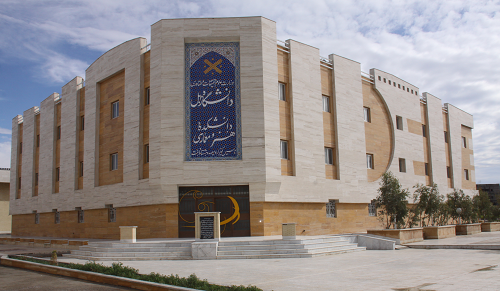
Faculty of Arts and Architecture

- Faculty Of Agriculture (1983)
- Faculty of Natural Resources (1999)
- Faculty Of Literature And Humanities (2000)
- Faculty of Science (2001)
- Faculty of Arts and Architecture (2001)
- Faculty of Engineering (2001)
- Faculty of Veterinary (2007)
- Faculty Of Water & Soil (2010)

== Institutes ==
- Hamoun International Wetland Research Institute (2006)
- Institute of Agriculture (2007)
- Institute of specific livestock (2006)
- Institute of Agricultural Biotechnology (2007)

== Gallery ==
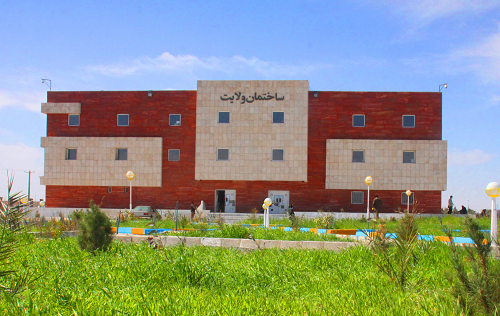
Presidential Building

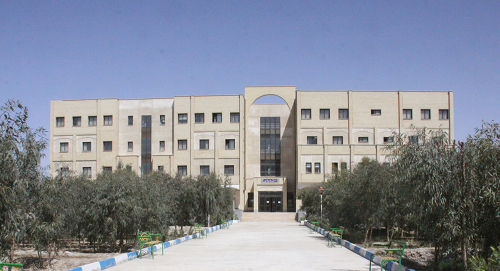
Faculty of Science

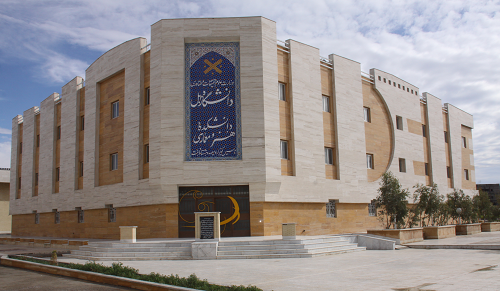
Faculty of Arts and Architecture

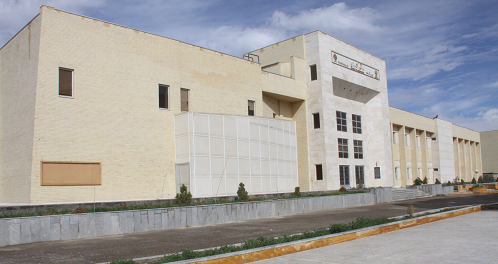
Faculty Of Agriculture

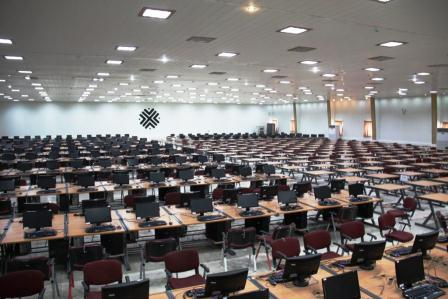
IT Building
