= Nursing in Iran =

Nursing educational programs in Iran are similar to the nursing educational programs in other countries in many aspects. Holding a secondary school diploma and passing the entrance exam is necessary for the admission. The entrance exams to governmental universities and Azad University are held separately. The duration of the associate degree course for operating room and anesthesia is two years, a bachelor's degree in nursing is four years, a master's degree in nursing is two to two and a half years, and a doctorate degree in nursing is four to five years.

In the beginning, nursing educational programs were part of medical educational programs. On the basis of this structure, the nurse followed the instruction of physician without any question. Nowadays, nursing educational program in Iran has been progressed and after the year 1992 considering the community base care, the nursing educational program also has changed.

In a bachelor's degree program, nursing students start the clinical work from the second term and continue through the completion of sixth term simultaneously with theoretical subjects. The seventh and eighth terms are allocated for a practical training program.

During the years of study, students have the opportunity to interact with patients in the various clinical areas, especially intensive care units, and gain great experience. Students' progress in clinical environments from simple issues toward more complex issues. At present, practical nursing degree and associate degree nursing programs have been eliminated and Iranian nurses must hold bachelor's degree to work in Iran from accredited universities confirmed by the Ministry of Health.

In 2014, the national curriculum envisaged 4 credits of clinical clerkship experiences in community-based healthcare centers to be completed between the 5th (1 credit) and the 8th semester (3 credits). Nursing students’ were involved in real and practical cases, while their education during clerkships was mainly based on lectures and on a variety of teacher-centered methods.

However, since the first three years of the undergraduate course students have the opportunity to join health care facilities, comprehensive of intensive care and specialist wards. A 2020 extended study on internal nursing students during their clerkships in Tehran university-affiliated hospitals showed spiritual beliefs, extraversion character and coping strategies play a significant role in increasing job satisfaction and in reducing the clinical practice stress, while the spiritual factor was associated to the need of a spiritual nourishment in the workplaces. Its impact seems to be because medical students with spiritual beliefs "consider caring patients glorified as a sacred job and a way to meet their spiritual goals."

== Nursing and related titles and education ==
- Nurse

Nurse is a person who is holding four years university degree and executes works relating to nursing profession including taking care of patients, perform health and medical services, educational, research and managerial affairs. At present annually 6000 persons are graduated in the bachelor's degree program in nursing.

- Practical Nurse

A person who is holding secondary school diploma in nursing and have completed 2 years program in nursing and cooperate in activities of nurses in medical sections under the supervision of nurses.

- Nursing Assistant

A person who is holding secondary school diploma and passing short term program for the execution of initial cares of patients under the supervision of nurses.

- Master in Nursing

Nurses after obtaining bachelor's degree and passing the entrance exam are eligible to continue their study in geriatric nursing, pediatric nursing, medical surgical nursing, community health nursing, psychiatric nursing and nursing education. These persons after graduation mainly become in charge of nurses' education or management of medical sections. Duration of this program is 2.5 years. At present annually 150 persons are graduated in master's degree program in nursing.

- PhD in Nursing

Nurses by holding master's degree after passing entrance exam, are eligible to continue their study in PhD in the field of Nursing. Duration of this program is 4 years and the graduates mainly will work in educational and research sections. At present annually 20 persons are graduated in this program.

== Nursing jobs in Iran ==
According to the census, approximately 120,000 nurses are currently working in Iran in various specialties.

Upon the approval and execution of the continuous education act, Iranian nurses should obtain score of 15 every year in various educational courses held by the Ministry of Health of Universities, Scientific Associations, and Nursing organizations.
