= Hamun Lake =

Lake in Sistan and Baluchestan, Iran

Hāmūn-e Helmand
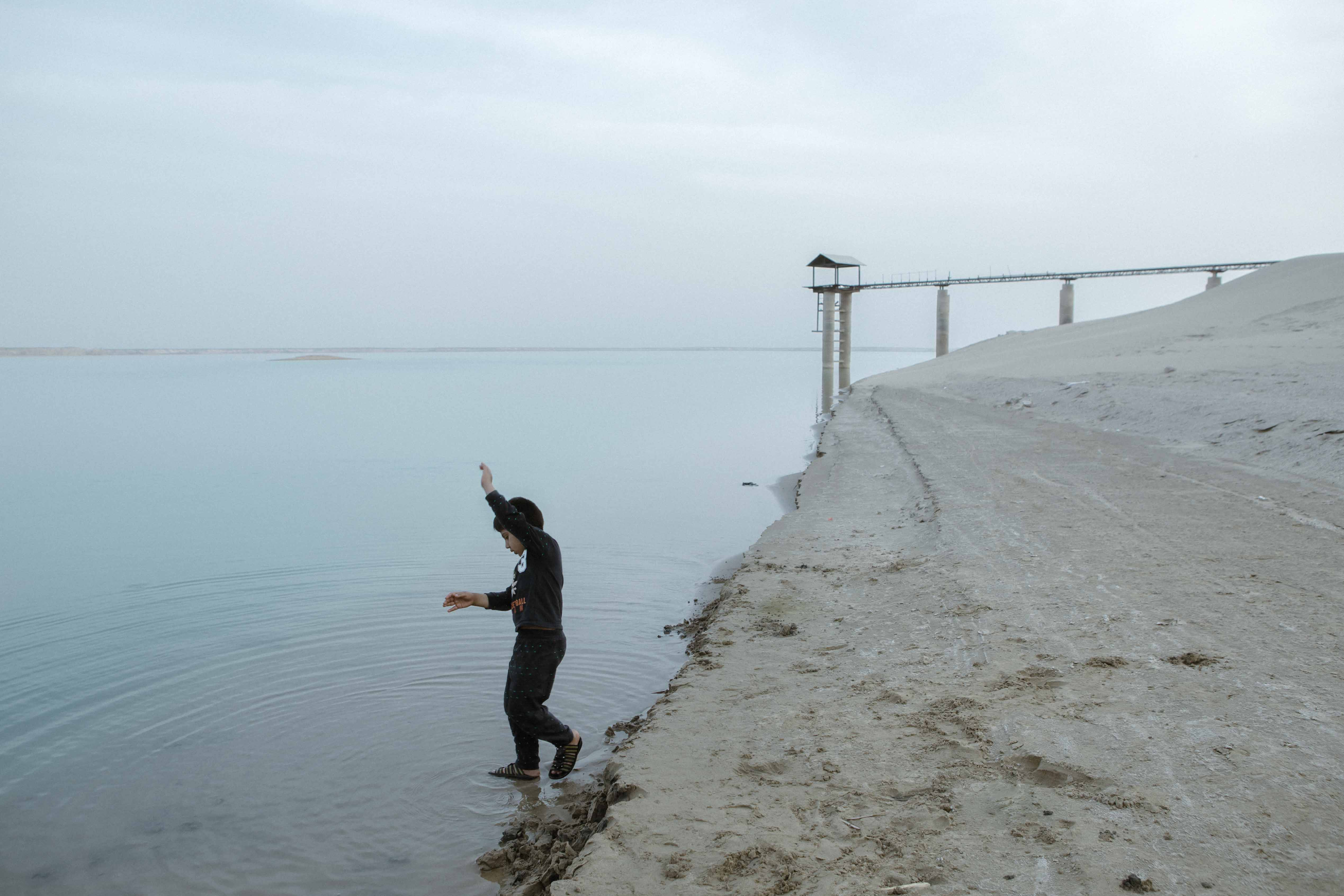
- A child plays on the bank of the Chah Nimeh reservoir, to the southeast of the lake, 2018

- Location within Iran
- Interactive map of Hāmūn-e Helmand
- Location: southeast Iran, southwest Afghanistan
- Coordinates: 30°50′N 61°40′E
- Primary inflows: Helmand River
- Basin countries: Afghanistan / Iran
- Surface area: 5,700 square kilometres (2,200 sq mi): Iran: 3,800 square kilometres (1,500 sq mi); Afghanistan: 1,900 square kilometres (730 sq mi)

Ramsar Wetland
- Official name: Hamun-e-Saberi & Hamun-e-Helmand
- Designated: 23 June 1975
- Reference no.: 42

Lake Hāmūn (Persian: دریاچه هامون, Daryāche-ye Hāmūn; Pashto: هامون ډنډ), or the Hamoun Oasis, is a seasonal lake and wetlands in the endorheic Sīstān Basin in the Sistan region on the Afghanistan–Iran border. In Iran, it is also known as Hāmūn-e Helmand, Hāmūn-e Hīrmand, or Daryāche-ye Sīstān ("Lake Sīstān").

Hāmūn is a generic term for shallow lakes (or lagoons), usually seasonal, that occur in the deserts of southeast Iran and adjacent areas of Afghanistan and Pakistan as a product of snowmelt in nearby mountains in spring. The term Hāmūn Lake (or Lake Hāmūn) equally applies to Hāmūn-e Helmand (entirely in Iran), as well to the shallow lakes Hāmūn-e Sabari and Hāmūn-e Puzak, which extend into the territory of present-day Afghanistan with the latter almost entirely inside Afghanistan.

The Hamun is fed by numerous seasonal water tributaries; the main tributary is the perennial Helmand River, which originates in the Hindu Kush mountains in Afghanistan. In modern times, and prior to the existence of the dams for agricultural irrigation, spring floods would bring into existence much larger lakes.

== Geography ==
It is located in Afghanistan on the Sīstān marshes west of the Dasht-e Mārgō desert where the Helmand River forms a dendritic delta. Water flows in a circular fashion through a string of lakes starting with Hāmūn-e Puzak in the northeast, sweeping into Hāmūn-e Sabari and finally overflows into Hāmūn-e Helmand in the southwest.

It used to cover an area of about 4,000 km^{2} (1,500 sq mi) with dense reed beds and tamarisk thicket fringing on the edges of the upper lakes. The area was thriving with wildlife animals and migratory birds.

A trapezoid-shaped basalt outcropping, known as Mount Khajeh, rises up as an island in the middle of which used to be Hāmūn Lake and the northeastern edge of Hāmūn-e Helmand. Its flat-topped peak rises up 609 meters above sea level with a diameter of 2–2.5 km (1.2–1.6 mi), being the only remaining natural uplift in the Sīstān flatlands.

Hamun Lake is sometimes categorized as three sibling shallow lakes, that is, Hamun-e Helmand, Hāmūn-e Sabari and Hāmūn-e Puzak, the latter extending into the Lash Wa Juwayn District of Farah Province in Afghanistan.

Lake Hāmūn is fed primarily by water catchments on the Afghan side, including the Harut River. It is in the Sistan region and it is in the Lash Wa Juwayn District of the Farah Province of Afghanistan. The Harut River flows into the lake on the Afghanistan side of the border. In 1976, when rivers in Afghanistan were flowing regularly, the amount of water in the lake was relatively high. Between 1999 and 2001, however, the lake all but dried up and disappeared, as can be seen in the 2001 satellite image.

When droughts occur in Afghanistan, or the water in watersheds that support Lake Hāmūn is drawn down by other natural or human-induced reasons, the result is a dry lake bed in Iran. In addition, when the lake is dry, seasonal winds blow fine sands off the exposed lake bed. The sand is swirled into huge dunes that may cover a hundred or more fishing villages along the former lakeshore. Wildlife around the lake is negatively impacted and fisheries are brought to a halt. Changes in water policies and substantial rains in the region hope to effect a return of much of the water in Lake Hamoun by 2003.

In 1975 the Hāmūn, together with Hāmūn-e Sabari, was designated a Ramsar site.

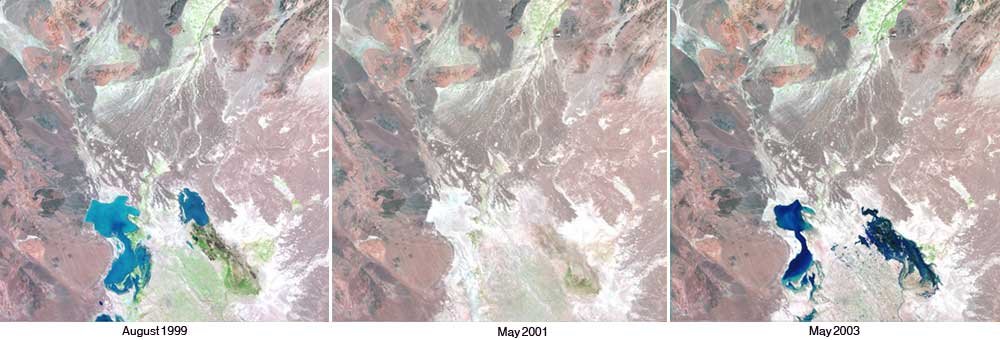
Time series of LANDSAT photographs showing water level in Lake Hāmūn, eastern Iran / southwestern Afghanistan.

== History ==
=== Archeological sites ===
The area has important archeological remains. The giant prehistoric city of Shahr-e Sukhteh is located in the area. Also the ruins of an ancient Achaemenid city Dahan-e Gholaman (“Gate of Slaves”) are near the Hāmūn Lake. Shahr-i-Sokhta is located about 35km southwest of Dahan-e Gholaman.

=== Irrigation ===
In the past five millennia, people have lived around Hamoun Oasis and its wetlands and their wildlife. Specific culture formed around the Hamoun with a way of life suited to the desert wetlands. They fashioned long reed boats to navigate the shallow waters and erected squat, red clay houses to withstand the heat of the desert. Their livelihood was based almost entirely on hunting, fishing, and farming.
Until the late 20th century, irrigation waxed and waned in the Sīstān Basin for over 4,000 years without destroying the wetlands, but then population rapidly increased and new water management technologies were brought to the region. Soon irrigation schemes began to snake their way throughout the basin. Farther west, revolving Afghan governments constructed large dams (Arghandab Dam, Kajaki Dam) that diverted water from the upper reaches of the river.

=== Devastation by extreme droughts in 1999-2001 ===
Precipitation variability in the Hindu Kush results in alternating periods of flooding in the Helmand and droughts, which may cause entire lagoons to dry up. This occurred several times in the 20th century when only the uppermost of the lakes remained flooded. Landsat satellite imagery show how dramatic decrease in precipitation resulted in decrease of snow-covered area in the Helmand Basin, from 41,000 km^{2} in 1998 to 26,000 km^{2} in 2000. By 2001, Iran and Afghanistan were experienced for the third consecutive year an extreme drought that was so severe that the Hamoun dried out completely.

Sīstān's population, swelled by refugees from war-torn Afghanistan, has been severely affected by water shortages. Irrigation channels have run dry and agriculture has come to a standstill, which has resulted in the abandonment of many villages as people migrate in search of water.

Combination of drought and the massive irrigation proved to be a shock to the wetlands. Within five years period (1998-2002) once fertile wetlands rapidly deteriorated. We could reasonably presume that transformation of Hamoun into arid country, like their surrounding areas, was mainly caused by irrigated agriculture expansion since the 1970s (represent as bright red patches on satellite images, mainly wheat and barley), coupled with one of the worst droughts ever witnessed in Central Asia in 1999-2001 period.
The wetlands have been replaced mostly by lifeless salt flats and decaying reed stands. The wildlife, the towns, the fisheries, and the agriculture that once surrounded the Hamoun have all fallen away, giving rise to a wasteland.

Winds that were once cooled by the waters of the wetlands now drifting dust, sand, and salt from the dried lakebeds onto the surrounding villages, and these sand drifts have submerged nearly 100 villages beneath dunes in a landscape reminiscent of the Aral Sea disaster. Most of the crops have been reduced to dust bowl conditions, livestock herds have been decimated, and thriving fishery with an annual catch of around 12,000 tons has been wiped out. Many who had lived around the Hamoun for generations either moved away or lost everything.
Local bird population disappeared and migratory birds no longer stop for lack of refuge, and wildlife that could not sustain themselves in the desert or make the long journey to another oasis died. The rest of the wetlands now give off the harsh glare of dried salt flats. The only relatively large bodies of standing water are Chāh-Nīmeh IV reservoir maintained for drinking water.

== See also ==
- Sīstān Basin
- Helmand River
- Mount Khajeh
- Arachosia
- Drangiana
- Sistan
