= Hamun =

A hamun (or hamoun) (Persian: هامون hāmūn) is an inland desert lake or marshland formed as a natural seasonal reservoir in areas adjoining the Helmand basin, found across eastern Iran, southern Afghanistan and western Pakistan. Hamuns form a critical link in the wildlife of the area, aquatic as well as avian and terrestrial.

The better-known hamuns include:

- Hamun-e Helmand, Afghanistan and Iran
  - Hamun Lake, Iran and Afghanistan
- Hamun-e Jaz Murian, Iran
- Hamun-e Mashkel or Mashkid, Balochistan mainly in Pakistan and border.
- Hamun-e Puzak, Afghanistan
- Hamun-e Saberi in Sistan, straddling Iran-Afghanistan border
- Hamun Zeheh, Goad-i Zereh or Godzareh Depression, Afghanistan
