= Afghanistan–Turkmenistan border =

International border

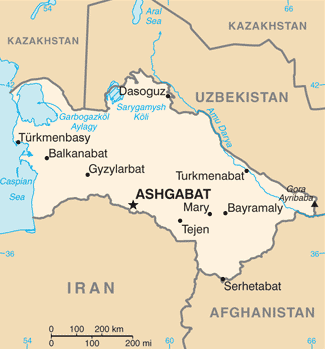
Map of Turkmenistan with Afghanistan to the south-east

Afghan and Turkmen boundary markers

The Afghanistan–Turkmenistan border is 804 km (500 mi) in length and runs from the tripoint with Iran to the tripoint with Uzbekistan.

== Description ==
The border starts at the tripoint with Iran on the Tedzhen river. Then proceeds eastwards in a series of mostly straight lines for about 90 km (56 mi), until reaching the Kushk River near the Afghan town of Torghundi, which it follows southwards for a 15 km (9.3 mi) section. It then proceeds across land for 150 km (93 mi) in a north-eastwards direction until reaching the Murghab River, which it follows northwards for 35 km (22 mi). It then continues across land north-eastwards for 370 km (230 mi) , until reaching the Amu Darya river just to the north of the Afghan town of Khamyab. The border then follows the thalweg of this river up to the tripoint with Uzbekistan.

The border traverses a thinly populated area consisting mostly of desert and some hills, except for the easternmost section where the Amu Darya is paralleled by a road and railway on the Turkmen side.

== History ==
The border was inherited from the old Soviet Union-Afghan border, which largely took its current shape during the 19th-century Anglo-Russian rivalry in Central Asia known as the Great Game. With the Russian Empire having conquered the Khanate of Khiva and the Emirate of Bukhara, and with the British Empire controlling the British Raj, the two powers agreed to leave Afghanistan as an independent buffer state between them.

In 1873 Britain and Russia agreed on a rough formulation of the border, with the Amu Darya declared to be the border going east from the vicinity of the village of Khwaja Salar to Lake Zorku, with the Wakhan Corridor to remain in Afghanistan. The western section of the border (i.e. the bulk of the modern Afghan-Turkmen boundary) was to be determined at a later date by a boundary commission.

Tensions mounted as the Russians expanded further into what is now Turkmenistan in the early 1880s, reaching a crisis with the Panjdeh incident (near Sandykachi in what is now Turkmenistan), an area claimed by Afghanistan. Discussions calmed the situation and a joint Anglo-Russian boundary commission demarcated the boundary as it is today over the period 1885–88. As the village of Khwaja Salar could no longer be identified it was agreed that the boundary should meet the Amu Darya in the vicinity of Khamiab, Afghanistan.

The easternmost section of the border (now forming part of the Afghan-Tajik boundary) was not finally delimited until 1893–95, with the Afghans agreeing to waive any claims to lands north the Amu Darya. This agreement also stipulated the position of the land border in the section east of Lake Zorkul up to China, with a series of boundary pillars subsequently erected.

In 1921 a Soviet-Afghan treaty was signed whereby Russia agreed "to hand over to Afghanistan the frontier districts which belonged to the latter in the last century, observing the principles of justice and self-determination of the population inhabiting the same." However this treaty was never implemented, and was explicitly annulled by the Frontier Agreement of 1946, which kept the boundary as it was, with riverine islands to be subsequently allocated by a joint commission.

In 1979 Soviet troops of the 40th Army crossed the border at Ymamnazar/Kushka as part of the Soviet Invasion of Afghanistan, en route to Herat and Kandahar.

There have been a number of incidents in recent years connected to the ongoing conflict and instability in Afghanistan, prompting Turkmenistan to increase its military presence on the frontier. In 2017 Turkmen president Gurbanguly Berdimuhamedow personally visited the border to inspect security arrangements there.

After the Taliban seized many regions in Afghanistan in 2021, a number of Afghan military and civilians crossed the border into Turkmenistan.

== Incidents ==
- There were several incidents along the border in 2014. In February Turkmen border guards killed a militant who crossed the border illegally and captured two others. In retaliation three Turkmen border guards were killed later that month. In May that year three Turkmen guards were killed by an armed group crossing the border from Ghormach District, Afghanistan.
- In October 2015, several Taliban fighters were chased onto an island in the Amu Darya by Afghan forces, forcing Turkmenistan's border security to prevent them entering their territory. This incident occurred a few weeks after Turkmenistan strongly protested Kazakhstan's president Nursultan Nazarbayev expressing concern about the security situation along the Afghan-Turkmen frontier.
- In 2017, four fighters believed to be affiliated with the Islamic State were apprehended crossing illegally into Turkmenistan.
- On 3 January 2021, a skirmish occurred at the Afghan-Turkmen border between the Taliban forces and the Turkmen border guards. The incident was reported by Hilal Balkhi, head of the Jowzjan province's department of culture and information, quoted by Aamaj News. It is alleged that three days earlier, Turkmen border troops killed one Afghan civilian and beat another. On 3 January, Taliban militants arrived at the border and the Turkmen border forces allegedly fired at them. The Taliban returned fire, and the militants suffered no losses.

== Border crossings ==
- Torghundi (AFG) -Serhetabat (TKM) (road and rail)
- Aqina (AFG) - Ymamnazar (TKM) (rail)

== Settlements near the border ==
=== Afghanistan ===
- Murichaq
- Jalajin
- Muhammad Tashi
- Soltan Robat
- Yaka Haji
- Bai Khan
- Kawk
- Khamyab
- Qarqin
- Keleft

=== Turkmenistan ===
- Serhetabat
- Bashbeden
- Khodzhali
- Ymamnazar
- Bosaga

== See also ==
- Afghanistan–Turkmenistan relations
