= Tajik Railways =

GUP "Rohi ohani Toçikiston" КВД «Роӽи оӽани Тоҷикистон» ГУП «Таджикская железная дорога»
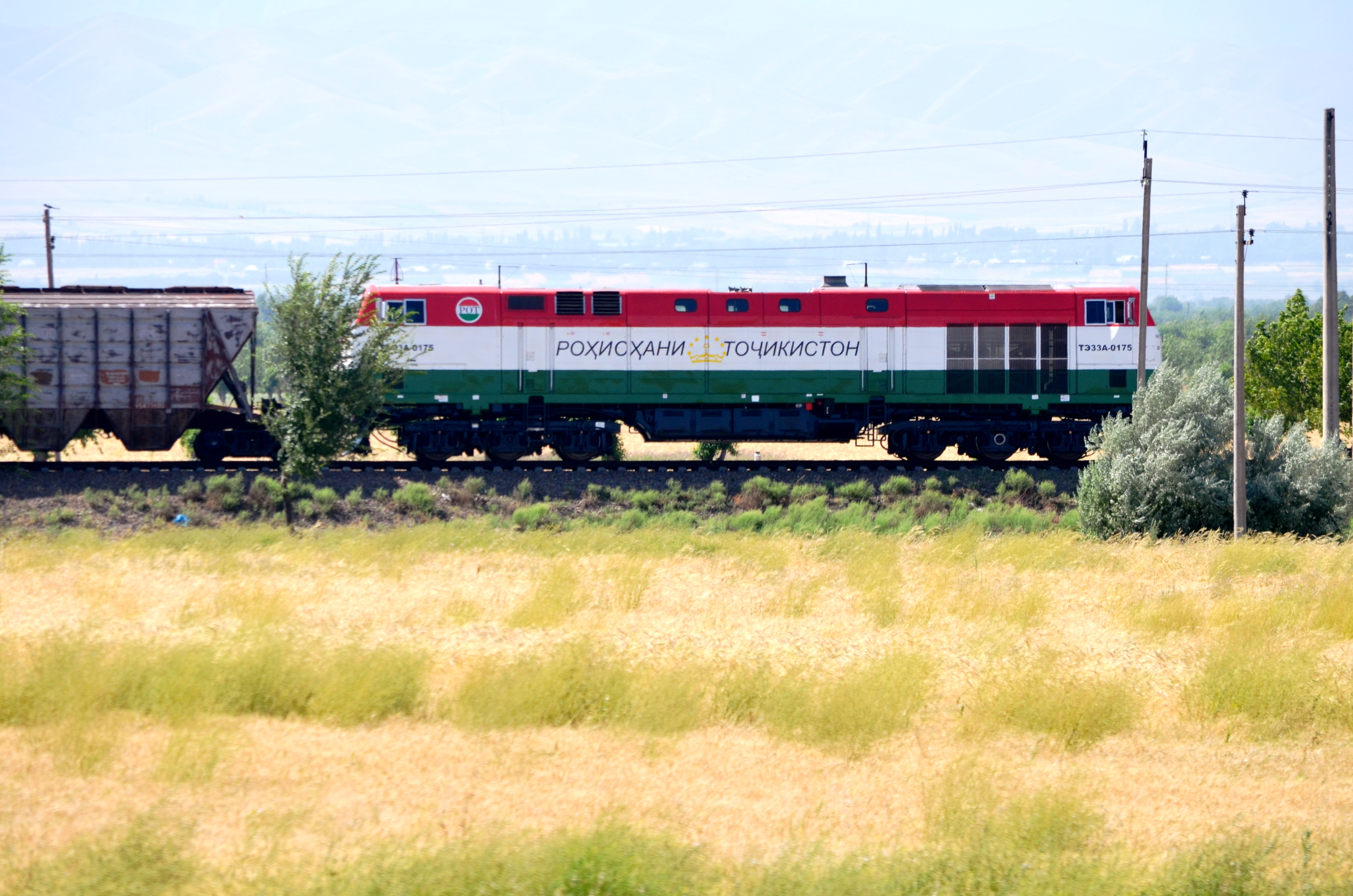
- Type: Unitary enterprise
- Industry: Rail transport
- Predecessor: Soviet Railways
- Founded: 1999; 27 years ago
- Headquarters: Dushanbe, Tajikistan
- Area served: Tajikistan
- Services: Passenger trains, Cargo
- Website: railway.tj

Tajik Railways (Tajik: Роӽи оӽани Тоҷикистон; Russian: Таджикская железная дорога) is Tajikistan's state-owned railway company, both owning and managing infrastructure and operating freight and passenger train services in Tajikistan. As of 2016, the system is limited, as the railroad system totals only 997 kilometres (620 mi) of non-electrified, single-track railway, all of it 1,520 mm (4 ft 11 27/32 in) Russian gauge.

== Infrastructure ==
Tajik Railways ГУП «Таджикская железная дорога»
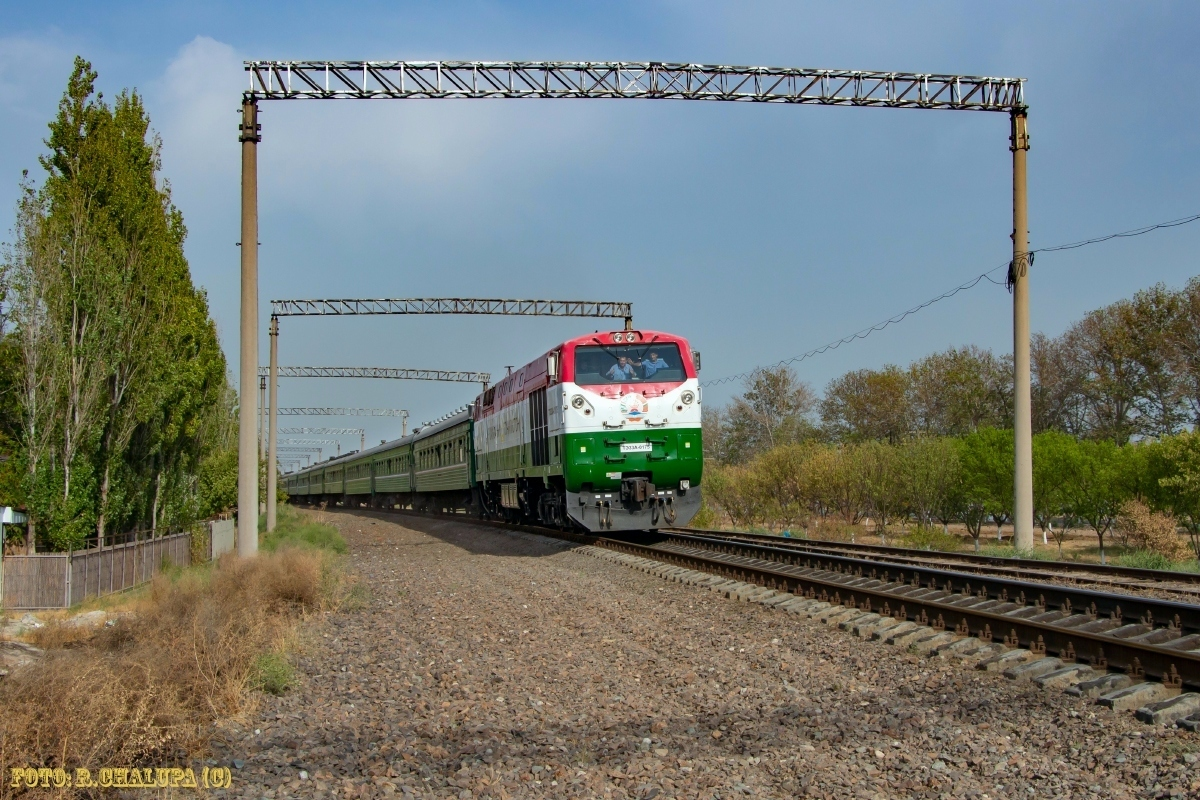

Overview
- Headquarters: Dushanbe
- Reporting mark: РОТ, ТЖД
- Locale: Tajikistan
- Dates of operation: 1999–present
- Predecessor: Soviet Railways

Technical
- Track gauge: 1,520 mm (4 ft 11 27/32 in)
- Length: 977 km (607 mi)

Other
- Website: railway.tj

The system connects the main urban centres of western Tajikistan with points in neighboring Uzbekistan. In 1999 a new line connected the southern cities of Bokhtar and Kulob. In 2016, another line connected both cities to the capital Dushanbe, thus linking southern and central railway networks together.

The northern branch around Khujand remains physically disconnected from this main Tajik railway network, accessible only through a lengthy transit via Uzbekistan. As of 2017, the passenger service remains limited to infrequent international trains from Dushanbe and Khujand to Moscow, one weekly train from Dushanbe to Khujand (via Uzbekistan) as well as a local service between Dushanbe and Pakhtaabad (daily) and Kulyob/Shahrtuz (twice weekly).

Passenger transit through Tajikistan has been hindered by periodic failures of Tajik Railways to pay transit tariffs and by safety issues.

=== Network ===
The system is currently limited to the following railways lines:

- Kulyab – Bokhtar – Yavan – Vakhdat – Dushanbe I – Pakhtaabad line with Kurgantyube – Shaartuz branch and exit from Pakhtaabad station to the Termez branch of Uzbek Railways;
- The Spitamen – Istiqlol line (Sogd section) with the Kanibadam – Isfara – Shurab branch and exits from Istiqlol station to the Ferghana branch, from Spitamen station to the Kokand branch of Uzbek Railways.

=== Railway links with adjacent countries ===
- Afghanistan – no link, same gauge 1,520 mm (4 ft 11 27/32 in).
- China – no link, break of gauge 1,520 mm (4 ft 11 27/32 in)/1,435 mm (4 ft 8 1/2 in).
- Kyrgyzstan – no link, same gauge 1,520 mm (4 ft 11 27/32 in).
- Uzbekistan – yes, linked with Uzbek Railways, same gauge 1,520 mm (4 ft 11 27/32 in).

== Five Nations Railway Corridor ==
Tajikistan is a key participant in the proposed Five Nations Railway Corridor (FNRC), a multi-country transit initiative designed to establish an overland rail corridor linking China, Kyrgyzstan, Tajikistan, Afghanistan, and Iran across an estimated total route of 2,100 kilometres (1,300 mi).

The project envisions a southern Eurasian freight route running from Kashgar in western China through southern Kyrgyzstan, traversing central and southern Tajikistan, continuing through northern and western Afghanistan (via Kunduz, Mazar-i-Sharif, and Herat), and connecting to the Iranian rail system at Khaf.

The proposed alignment within Tajikistan spans roughly 392 to 500 kilometres (244 to 311 mi), entering from Kyrgyzstan via the Rasht Valley or Karamyk pass, running southwest through the Vahdat–Dushanbe corridor, and continuing south towards Panji Poyon (formerly known as Nizhny Pyanj) on the Afghan border.

For Tajik Railways, the project would provide several major strategic advantages:

- Direct overland rail connections to Iranian seaports on the Persian Gulf and Gulf of Oman (such as Chabahar Port and Bandar Abbas), bypassing traditional transit dependencies through northern regional routes.
- Potential integration into transcontinental trade corridors connecting Chinese manufacturing centres directly to Middle Eastern and European markets.

Significant technical and financial challenges remain, including the mountainous topography of the Pamir-Alay ranges, high construction capital costs, regional security considerations along the Afghan section, and break of gauge operations between 1,435 mm (4 ft 8 1/2 in) standard gauge (used in China and Iran) and the 1,520 mm (4 ft 11 27/32 in) broad gauge used across Tajikistan.

== See also ==
- Railway stations in Tajikistan
- North-South Transport Corridor
- Ashgabat Agreement, a Multimodal transport agreement signed by India, Oman, Iran, Turkmenistan, Uzbekistan and Kazakhstan, for creating an international transport and transit corridor facilitating transportation of goods between Central Asia and the Persian Gulf.
- Five Nations Railway Corridor
