= Dishu =

Dishu may refer to:

- Dishu, Afghanistan, village in Dishu District, Helmand Province, Afghanistan
- Dishu District, district in Helmand Province, Afghanistan
- Dishu system, legal and moral system involving marriage and inheritance in ancient East Asia
- Ground calligraphy (地書, dishu), a recreational practice of calligraphy, involving writing with a large water brush on the ground, in Chinese culture
