= Rail transport in Afghanistan =

Rail Transport in Afghanistan
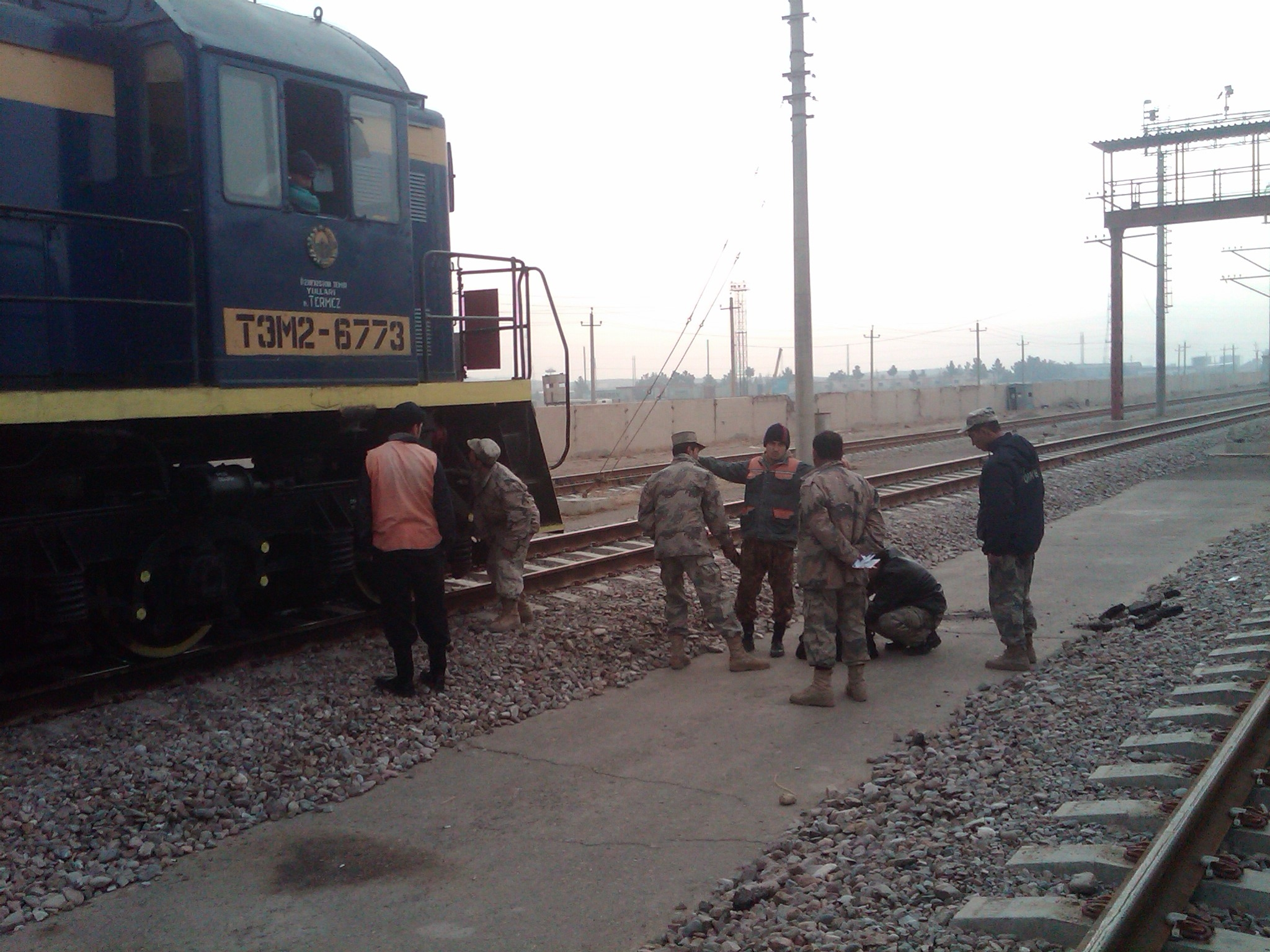
- Afghan Border Force inspecting a locomotive at Hairatan, Afghanistan (2011)

Statistics
- Ridership: N/A
- Freight: No Info

System length
- Total: 400 km (250 mi)
- Electrified: None

Track gauge
- Main: 1,435 mm (4 ft 8 1/2 in)
- Standard gauge 1,435 mm (4 ft 8 1/2 in): 107.7 km (66.9 mi)

Features
- Longest bridge: Afghanistan–Uzbekistan Friendship Bridge; 816 m (2,677 ft)

Afghanistan has four railway lines in the north and northwest of the country. The first is between Mazar-i-Sharif and Hairatan in Balkh Province, which then connects with Uzbek Railways of Uzbekistan (opened 2011). The second links Torghundi in Herat Province with Turkmen Railways of Turkmenistan (opened 1960). The third is between Turkmenistan and Aqina in Faryab Province of Afghanistan (opened in 2016), which extends south to the city of Andkhoy. The country currently lacks a passenger rail service, but a new rail link from Herat in Afghanistan to Khaf in Iran for both cargo and passengers is under construction. Passenger service is also proposed in Hairatan – Mazar-i-Sharif section and Mazar-i-Sharif – Aqina section.

Afghanistan's rail network is in the developing stage. The current rail lines are to be extended in the near future, with plans to include cargo and passenger services. This will connect the four subcontinents of Asia through Afghanistan.

== History ==
=== Kabul tramway ===
In the 1920s, King Amanullah bought three small steam locomotives from Henschel of Kassel in Germany, which were put to work on a 2 ft 6 in (762 mm) gauge roadside railway, 7 km (4.3 mi) long, linking Kabul and Darulaman. The December 1922 issue of The Locomotive magazine includes: "Travellers from Afghanistan state a railway is being laid down for a distance of some six miles from Kabul to the site of the new city of Darulaman, and also that some of the rolling stock for it is being manufactured in the Kabul workshops". The August 1928 issue of The Locomotive magazine mentions: "The only railway at present in Afghanistan is five miles long, between Kabul and Darulaman". The tramway closed (date unknown), and was dismantled in the 1940s, but as of 2004 the locomotives were held, outdoors, at the National Museum of Afghanistan in Darulaman.

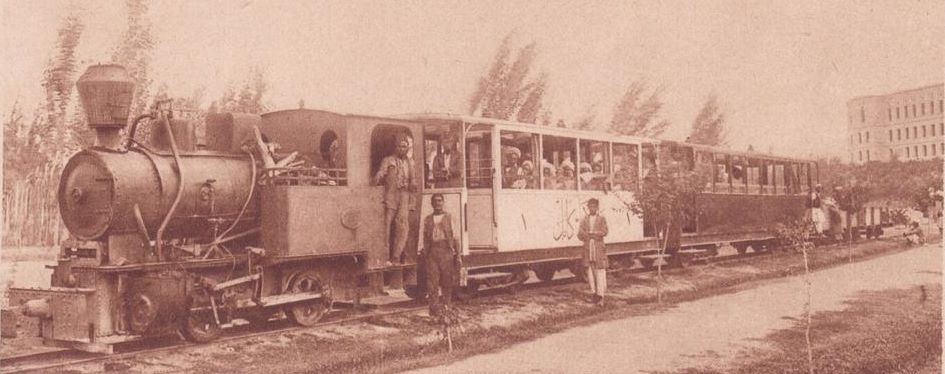
The 7 km long railway between Kabul and Darum-Aman

In total, three small Henschel 0-4-T steam locomotives were used. Those three survive in the Kabul Museum since 2002. The third locomotive (Henschel 19691 of 1923) might be a different gauge, implying its origin is from a different railway all together. However Henchel 19680 and 19681 of 1923 were found in the former engine shed of the Kabul and Darulaman Railway, characterized with its green paint (mostly faded).

=== Proposed railways ===
Over the 19th century and a half, plenty of proposals have been made about building railways in Afghanistan. In 1885, the New York Times wrote about plans for connecting the Russian Transcaspian Railway, then under construction, with British India via Sarakhs, Herat, and Kandahar. When completed, the project would allow British officers to travel from London to British India, mostly by rail, in 11 to 12 days (crossing the English Channel, the Black Sea, and the Caspian Sea by boat).

About 1928, proposals were put forward for a railway to link Jalalabad with Kabul, eventually connecting to the then-British Indian system at Peshawar. Lines to join Kabul with Kandahar and Herat would follow later. Owing to political upheavals these plans were not implemented.

In 1930s, the Japanese Ministry of Railways proposed Eurasian high speed rail from Tokyo to Paris via Busan (through Korea Strait undersea tunnel), Beijing, Baotou, Turfan, Kashgar, Kabul, Tehran, Baghdad, Istanbul with connection to Berlin and Rome but never realised at the beginning of the World War II.

=== Industrial railways ===
In the 1950s a hydroelectric power station was built at Surobi, east of Kabul. Three Henschel four-wheel 600 mm (1 ft 11 5/8 in) narrow gauge diesel-hydraulic locomotives built in 1951 (works numbers 24892, 24993, 24994) were supplied to the power station.

In 1979 mining and construction locomotive builder Bedia Maschinenfabrik of Bonn supplied five D35/6 two axle diesel-hydraulic 600 mm (1 ft 11 5/8 in) narrow gauge locomotives, works numbers 150–154, to an unknown customer in Afghanistan.

On 24 March 2026 Afghanistan was suspended from the OTIF for not paying contributions, losing its voting rights in the organization, the suspension was announced to be in practice since 1 January 2026 until dues are paid.

== Timeline ==
=== 2007 ===
- April - Work begins on Khaf-Herat railway.

=== 2010 ===
- 27 January - Construction on Uzbekistan Afghanistan railway begins.

=== 2011 ===
- May 2011 - Kerki - Ymamnazar - Aqina - Andkhoy railway project approved.
- 20/21 August - First freight services begin from Hairatan to Mazar-e Sharif.

=== 2013 ===
- March - Turkmenistan-Afghanistan-Tajikistan(TAT) Railway is approved in a trilateral meeting held in Lebap, approved from Kerki to Kholm.
- June - Construction begins on the Kerki - Aqina railway.

=== 2016 ===
- April - Joint agreement made to begin feasibility study on Torghundi - Herat railway by afghan and turkmen governments.
- September - First section of the Khaf-Herat railway, Khaf-Sangan railway completed.
- November - Turkmenistan-Afghanistan railway section Kerki-Aqina is completed.

=== 2017 ===
- October - Second section of the Khaf - Herat railway completed Sangan to shamtiq border crossing inside iran completed.
- 23 November - Afghan and Turkmen governments ink an MoU regarding the repair of the Torghundi - Serhetabad railway and related infrastructure.

=== 2018 ===
- 23 February 2018 - The Torghundi - Serhetabad railway was officially commissioned after being renovated.

=== 2019 ===
- February - Aqina – Andkhoy railway line MoU signed.
- July - Construction begins on the Aqina - Andkhoy railway.

=== 2020 ===
- December - Third section of the Khaf-Herat railway, border crossing Shamtiq - Rozanak, Ghurian District completed.

=== 2021 ===
- 14 January - Aqina-Andkhoy railway inaugurated.
- February - It was announced that the Feasibility study of the Peshawar- Jalalabad railway would be completed by June 2021.

=== 2022 ===
- 10 November - Zahedan- Khash section of the Chabahar-Zahedan railway officially inaugurated.

=== 2023 ===
- 11 July - Freight operations on the Khaf-Herat railway begins.

=== 2024 ===
- 30 July - Feasibility Study approved for Tajik section of TAT Railway funded by KOICA.
- September - Construction of the fourth section of the Khaf-Herat railway, Rozanak - Herat section begins.
- 11 September - Construction begins on the first section of the Torghundi - Herat railway, the Torghundi - Sangbor section.

=== 2025 ===
- Late February - Turkmen and Afghan officials discuss beginning of feasibility study for the 55 km (34 mi) Andkhoy-Sheberghan railway.
- April - Iranian officials announce that the Khaf - Herat railway would be completed by March 2026.
- 22 October - Iranian, Turkish and Afghan officials discussed the Herat-Mazar-i-Sharif section of the FNRC, a $10 million feasibility study was initiated with completion scheduled in March 2026.
- Late October - Iranian officials announce that the Chabahar-Zahedan railway is 84% complete.

=== 2026 ===
- Late January - Iranian officials state that the substructure of Chabahar-Zahedan railway is 96% complete, 75% of tracks laid, station buildings almost complete, key stations complete, overall completion by end of 2026 and railway operations by June 2027.
- 4 February - Uzbek president Shavkat Mirziyoyev formally decreed to launch procedures to begin a joint feasibility study on the UAP railway project with Afghan and Pakistani governments.
- February - Iranian officials expanded some railway stations in Section 4 of the Khaf-Herat railway as logistical depots.
- 24 March - OTIF suspends Afghanistan for not paying dues, Afghanistan temporarily loses its voting rights in the organization.

== Track gauge ==
Until the 21st century, less than 25 km (16 mi) of railway existed inside Afghanistan, which was built to 1520 mm (4 ft 11 27/32 in) Russian gauge. For strategic reasons, past Afghan governments averted the construction of railways which could aid foreign interference in Afghanistan by Britain or Russia. The gauges in adjacent countries were:

- Iran, to the west, and China, to the east: 1435 mm (4 ft 8 1/2 in)
- Pakistan, to the south and east: 1676 mm (5 ft 6 in)
- Turkmenistan, Uzbekistan, and Tajikistan, to the north: 1520 mm (4 ft 11 27/32 in).

In 2010, the international 1435 mm (4 ft 8 1/2 in) "standard gauge" was chosen to be the country's railway gauge. The Khaf-Herat railway, a joint project between Afghanistan and Iran completed in 2020, was built to that gauge. As of 2020 it was 130 km (81 mi) long, of which 60 km (37 mi) was in Afghanistan; the remainder was in Iran. It links Afghan with Turkey, Europe and Iranian ports in the Persian Gulf.

== Network ==
This is the list of the current and future Railway Network of Afghanistan.

Afghanistan Railway Network
No.	Corridor	Gauge	Sections	From	To	Length (km)	Construction period	Note	Status
1	CASA railway corridor (Turkmenistan) (Afghanistan) (Pakistan)	1520 mm	Phase 1	Serhetabat (Turkmenistan)	Torghundi	4	Soviet Era - 1974. Rehabilitation in 2017– 23 February 2018	Supported by Turkmenistan and Kazakhstan to connect to Spin Boldak on the Pakistan border	Operational
1	CASA railway corridor (Turkmenistan) (Afghanistan) (Pakistan)	1520 mm	Phase 2	Torghundi	Sangbor	22	11 September 2024–Present	Supported by Turkmenistan and Kazakhstan to connect to Spin Boldak on the Pakistan border	Under construction
1	CASA railway corridor (Turkmenistan) (Afghanistan) (Pakistan)	1520 mm	Phase 3	Sangbor	Herat (Robat-e-Parian)	90		Supported by Turkmenistan and Kazakhstan to connect to Spin Boldak on the Pakistan border	Planned
1	CASA railway corridor (Turkmenistan) (Afghanistan) (Pakistan)	1520 mm	Phase 4	Herat (Robat-e-Parian)	Herat (Airport)	57		Supported by Turkmenistan and Kazakhstan to connect to Spin Boldak on the Pakistan border	Planned
1	CASA railway corridor (Turkmenistan) (Afghanistan) (Pakistan)	1435 mm or 1520 mm or dual gauge	Section 1	Herat	Farah	216		Supported by Turkmenistan and Kazakhstan to connect to Spin Boldak on the Pakistan border	Proposed
1	CASA railway corridor (Turkmenistan) (Afghanistan) (Pakistan)	1435 mm or 1520 mm or dual gauge	Section 2	Farah	Lashkargah	420		Supported by Turkmenistan and Kazakhstan to connect to Spin Boldak on the Pakistan border	Proposed
1	CASA railway corridor (Turkmenistan) (Afghanistan) (Pakistan)	1435 mm or 1520 mm or dual gauge	Section 3	Lashkargah	Kandahar	140		Supported by Turkmenistan and Kazakhstan to connect to Spin Boldak on the Pakistan border	Proposed
1	CASA railway corridor (Turkmenistan) (Afghanistan) (Pakistan)	1435 mm or 1520 mm or dual gauge	Section 4	Kandahar	Spin Boldak	96		Supported by Turkmenistan and Kazakhstan to connect to Spin Boldak on the Pakistan border	Proposed
1	CASA railway corridor (Turkmenistan) (Afghanistan) (Pakistan)	1435 mm or 1520 mm or dual gauge	Section 5	Spin Boldak	Chaman (Pakistan)	12		Approved on May 29, 2012, but never started	Approved
2	Trans-Afghan Railway (Uzbekistan) (Afghanistan) (Pakistan)	1520 mm	Section 1	Termez (Uzbekistan)	Hairatan		Soviet Era - 1982		Operational
2	Trans-Afghan Railway (Uzbekistan) (Afghanistan) (Pakistan)	1520 mm	Section 2	Hairatan	Mazar-i-Sharif International Airport	75	27 January 2010– 20/21 August 2011		Operational
2	Trans-Afghan Railway (Uzbekistan) (Afghanistan) (Pakistan)	1520 mm	Section 3	Naibabad	Puli Khumri	177			Planned
2	Trans-Afghan Railway (Uzbekistan) (Afghanistan) (Pakistan)	1520 mm	Section 4	Puli Khumri	ShashPul, Bamyan	175			Planned
2	Trans-Afghan Railway (Uzbekistan) (Afghanistan) (Pakistan)	1520 mm	Section 5	ShashPul, Bamyan	Kabul	171			Planned
2	Trans-Afghan Railway (Uzbekistan) (Afghanistan) (Pakistan)	1520 mm	Section 5	Kabul	Logar	171			Planned
2	Trans-Afghan Railway (Uzbekistan) (Afghanistan) (Pakistan)	1520 mm	Section 6	Logar	Kharlachi (Pakistan)	124			Planned
3	Five Nations Railway Corridor (Northern Line)	1435 mm	Section 1 & 2	Khaf, Iran	shamtiq border crossing	0	April 2007 - October 2017		Completed
3	Five Nations Railway Corridor (Northern Line)	1435 mm	Section 3	shamtiq (Iran)	Rozanak	62	inaugurated in December 2020		Completed
3	Five Nations Railway Corridor (Northern Line)	1435 mm	Section 4- Phase 1	Rozanak	Robat Pariyan	43	Inaugurated on September 28, 2026		Completed
3	Five Nations Railway Corridor (Northern Line)	1435 mm	Section 4- Phase 2	Robat Pariyan	Herat Airport	44	Work started on 11 September 2024		Under construction
3	Five Nations Railway Corridor (Northern Line)	1435 mm	Herat To Mazar-i-Sharif 650km	Herat	Sangbor	100		Part of Turkmenistan-Afghanistan-Tajikistan(TAT) Railway Proposed	Planned
3	Five Nations Railway Corridor (Northern Line)	1435 mm	Herat To Mazar-i-Sharif 650km	Sangbor	Balamurghab			Part of Turkmenistan-Afghanistan-Tajikistan(TAT) Railway Proposed	Planned
3	Five Nations Railway Corridor (Northern Line)	1435 mm	Herat To Mazar-i-Sharif 650km	Balamurghab	Qeysar	121		Part of Turkmenistan-Afghanistan-Tajikistan(TAT) Railway Proposed	Planned
3	Five Nations Railway Corridor (Northern Line)	1435 mm	Herat To Mazar-i-Sharif 650km	Qeysar	Maimana	57		Part of Turkmenistan-Afghanistan-Tajikistan(TAT) Railway Proposed	Planned
3	Five Nations Railway Corridor (Northern Line)	1435 mm	Herat To Mazar-i-Sharif 650km	Maimana	Sheberghan	296		Part of Turkmenistan-Afghanistan-Tajikistan(TAT) Railway Proposed	Planned
3	Five Nations Railway Corridor (Northern Line)	1435 mm	Herat To Mazar-i-Sharif 650km	Sheberghan	Naibaabad Mazar Sharif			Part of Turkmenistan-Afghanistan-Tajikistan(TAT) Railway Proposed	Planned
3	Five Nations Railway Corridor (Northern Line)	1435 mm	Mazar-i-Sharif To Wakhan 700 Km	Naibabad	Qala-e-Zal	123		Part of Turkmenistan-Afghanistan-Tajikistan(TAT) Railway Proposed	Planned
3	Five Nations Railway Corridor (Northern Line)	1435 mm	Mazar-i-Sharif To Wakhan 700 Km	Qala-e-Zal	Sherkhan Bandar	123		Part of Turkmenistan-Afghanistan-Tajikistan(TAT) Railway Proposed	Planned
3	Five Nations Railway Corridor (Northern Line)	1435 mm	Mazar-i-Sharif To Wakhan 700 Km	Qala-e-Zal	kunduz	55		Part of Turkmenistan-Afghanistan-Tajikistan(TAT) Railway Proposed	Planned
3	Five Nations Railway Corridor (Northern Line)	1435 mm	Mazar-i-Sharif To Wakhan 700 Km	Kunduz	Badakhshan	199			Planned
3	Five Nations Railway Corridor (Northern Line)	1435 mm	Mazar-i-Sharif To Wakhan 700 Km	Badakhshan	Wakhan (China)	367			Planned
4	Aqina to Sheberghan	1520 mm	Phase 1	Kerki (Turkmenistan)	Aqina	0	June 2013 - November 2016	Part of Turkmenistan-Afghanistan-Tajikistan(TAT) Railway	Completed
4	Aqina to Sheberghan	1520 mm	Phase 2	Aqina	Andkhoy - North	30	July 2019 - 14 January 2021	Part of Turkmenistan-Afghanistan-Tajikistan(TAT) Railway	Completed
4	Aqina to Sheberghan	1520 mm	Phase 3	Andkhoy - North	Andkhoy - East	10		Part of Turkmenistan-Afghanistan-Tajikistan(TAT) Railway	Under construction
4	Aqina to Sheberghan	1520 mm	Phase 4	Andkhoy - East	Sheberghan	55		Part of Turkmenistan-Afghanistan-Tajikistan(TAT) Railway	Planned
5	Kandahar to Kabul	1435							
5	Kandahar to Kabul	1435	Section 4	Kandahar	Zabul				Proposed
5	Kandahar to Kabul	1435	Section 5	Zabul	Ghazni				Proposed
5	Kandahar to Kabul	1435	Section 6	Ghazni	Logar				Proposed
5	Kandahar to Kabul	1435	Section 7	Logar	Kabul				Proposed
6	Herat to Bamyan (Central Line)	1435	Section 1	Herat	Ghor	574 km			Proposed
6	Herat to Bamyan (Central Line)	1435	Section 2	Ghor	Bamyan	574 km			Proposed
7	Jalalabad to Peshawar			Jalalabad	Torkham	76			Proposed
8	Lashkargah to Bahramcha	1676 mm		Lashkargah	Bahramcha	254			Planned
9	Zarang to Delaram	1435		Zarang	Delaram	204			Planned
Total									

== Railway stations ==
There are currently no passenger services or passenger train stations in Afghanistan. If any of the various cross-border links are completed and opened to passenger service, new passenger stations will have to be built.

=== Proposed ===
Details of the preliminary list of stations to be served, which circle the central mountains of Afghanistan are available.

== National Rail Authority ==
The Afghan government planned to form a railway construction commission with technical cooperation provided by the European Commission, which was discussed at the G8 meeting in July 2011. The commission would be responsible for supervising construction of a rail network within the country and its connection with the country's neighbors. In October 2011, the Asian Development Bank approved funding for Afghanistan's national rail authority. The Afghanistan Railway Authority has a website but, as of August 2017, there is very little on it. It does state that Afghanistan Railway Law (12 chapters and 105 clauses) was drafted in February 2013 and is awaiting approval from "relevant institutions". Training has been provided by the United States Army's Afghanistan Railroad Advisory Team (ARAT).

== Current railways and future plans ==
=== Afghanistan–Iran rail service ===
Khaf-Herat Railway Map (highlighted in red)

The Khaf-Herat railway is 225 km (140 mi) long, with 140 km (87 mi) of the track traversing Afghanistan and the remaining 85 km (53 mi) running through Iran. The construction of the Khaf-Herat rail line, which links Khaf in eastern Iran with Herat in western Afghanistan, began back in 2007.

The Iranian railhead closest to the Afghan border is at Khaf near Mashhad, and this is a 1,435 mm (4 ft 8 1/2 in) standard gauge freight line. Since 2002, Afghans and Iranians have been planning to extend this line east to Herat in Afghanistan. The line is currently operational to as far as Rozanak station in the Ghorian District of Herat Province.

The Khaf-Herat rail route has four sections, two in Iran and two in Afghanistan. Within Iran, section 1, running from Khaf to Sangan (14 km [8.7 mi]), was completed in September 2016. Section 2, from Sangan to the Afghanistan–Iran border at Shamtiq (64 km [40 mi]), was completed in October 2017. Section 3, running within Afghanistan from the border at Shamtiq–Jono to Rozanak in Ghorian District (61.2 km [38.0 mi]) was completed in December 2020. On May 9, 2023, the first trial run of cargo from Iran to Afghanistan via the Khaf-Herat railway was completed. This shipment included 17 wagons that transferred 655 tons of railway equipment that will be used in the further construction of the rail line.

On 10 November 2022 the Khash-Zahedan railway was officially inaugurated as part of the larger Chabahar-Zahedan railway, the Chabahar-Zahedan railway is a vital corridor to Afghanistan's potential alternative to Karachi and Gwadar, Chabahar Port.

Section 4 is the line from Rozanak to Guzara District (86 km [53 mi]). Work is ongoing on this section, which ends at an industrial area next to Herat International Airport. In September 2024 work on Khaf-Herat railway had resumed simultaneously with the Torghundi-Herat railway from Turkmenistan. In April 2025 Iranian officials announced that the 225 km (140 mi) Khaf-herat railway would be completed by March 2026.

On 22 October 2025 Afghan, Iranian and Turkish officials discussed the Herat - Mazar-i-Sharif railway as part of the FNRC at the UIC summit in Istanbul, a US$10 million feasibility study was agreed with completion scheduled in March 2026.

On 25 October 2025, Iranian officials stated that the Chabahar-Zahedan railway was 84% complete and was expected to be fully constructed by Nowruz (20 March 2026).

In the first weeks of November 2025, Afghanistan was said to have imported 5,000 tonnes of diesel by rail via the Khaf-Herat railway.

In late January 2026 Iranian officials reported that the substructure work of the Chabahar-Zahedan railway was 96% completed and track laying was 75% completed with station buildings almost complete and key stations like Iranshahr ready for operation. The railway was expected to be completed by the end 2026 and be operational in June of 2027.

In February 2026 Iranian officials reported expansion of railway station in Afghanistan as well as railway trade reaching 94,000 tons in Bahman of the same year.

In August 2026 the Iranian transport minister Farzaneh Sadegh stated that track laying along the railway was complete and the railway will be operational within three months.

=== Afghanistan–Pakistan rail service ===
There is currently no rail link between Afghanistan and Pakistan. Two broad gauge 1,676 mm (5 ft 6 in) Pakistan Railways lines with steep gradients terminate on the border at Chaman and Torkham. In July 2010, the two countries signed a memorandum of understanding for laying rail tracks but the project was soon canceled. It was to connect Quetta in Pakistan with Kandahar in Afghanistan and Peshawar in Pakistan with Jalalabad in Afghanistan. On May 29, 2012, the section from Chaman in Pakistan to Spin Boldak in Afghanistan (12 km [7.5 mi]) was approved, though it never started.

=== Afghanistan–Tajikistan rail service ===
A multination rail link was planned between Afghanistan and Tajikistan in March 2013. The Turkmenistan-Afghanistan-Tajikistan (TAT) railway was planned to run on the Kerki-Ymamnazar-Aqina- Andkhoy-Mazar-i-Sharif- Kholm, Tajik and Afghan officials could not finalize on the final afghan section of the railway with Afghans wanting to extend the railway to Kunduz and then having it turn to the Tajik border making it 383 km (238 mi) long in Afghanistan while Tajik officials wished for the railway to extend to Kaldar near Hairatan from Kholm where the railway would join the tajik border making the railway 323 km (201 mi) long inside Afghanistan.

In 2018 a 50 km (31 mi) extension from Kolkhozobod in Tajikistan to the Afghan crossing at Sher Khan Bandar via Panji Poyon (Lower Panj) was approved with construction expected to start that year.

On February 3 2021 the Tajik ministry of transport announced that it needed US $128 million to construct the Tajik section of the TAT Railway that passed through the Jaloliddin Balkhi and Panj Districts.

A feasibility study funded by KOICA was approved on 30 July 2024 for the TAT Railway Tajik section. The feasibility study involved the study of the 51 km (32 mi) long Jaloliddin Balkhi- Jayhun-Panji Poyon route involving 28 bridges and 160 drainage systems. The cost of the feasibility study alone reached US$4 million.

=== Afghanistan–Turkmenistan rail service ===
A 10 km-long (6.2 mi) line extends from Serhetabat in Turkmenistan to the town of Torghundi in Afghanistan. An upgrade of this Soviet-built line dating back to the 1960s, using Russian gauge, began in 2007. In April 2016, an agreement was reached for a technical feasibility study for a proposal to extend this line approximately 100 km (62 mi) to the city of Herat, where it could connect to the standard-gauge line to Iran that is being built. In accordance with earlier decisions, the line is likely to be standard gauge, with break of gauge at Torghundi. In April 2018 it was decided by the Turkmen government to build a railway from Galkynysh Gas Field in the direction of Afghanistan, towards Torghundi.

Another rail line was opened further east in November 2016, connecting Aqina in Faryab province via Ymamnazar with Atamyrat/Kerki in Turkmenistan. Work on a 58 km (36 mi) extension to Andkhoy soon began, which was completed in January 2021. The Turkmen section alone is 85 km (53 mi) long.

It is planned to become part of a rail corridor through northern Afghanistan, connecting it via Sheberghan to Mazar-i Sharif and on to the border of Tajikistan.

On 11 September 2024 a $40 million USD project was commenced to extend the 1,520 mm railway to Sangbor.

In late February 2025, Afghanistan and Turkmenistan signed several MoUs regarding several matters including the expansion of the Torghundi railway station, completion of the 10 km (6.2 mi) section of Aqina-Andkhoy railway and the continuation of construction of the 22 km (14 mi) Torghundi-Sangbar. The initiation of a feasibility study for the 55 km (34 mi) Andkhoy-Sheberghan railway was also discussed, the planned route was through the districts of Khan Char Bagh and Khwaja Du Koh in Jowzjan with future plans involving connection to Mazar-i-Sharif.

On 24 April 2025, Afghanistan, Turkmenistan and Kazakhstan signed a protocol of intent to begin the construction of the Torghundi-Herat-Kandahar-Spin Boldak railway line, the meeting was led by the Kazakh minister of national economy Serik Jumanğarin. Talks included the building of a fibreoptic cable along the railway as well as expansion of dryports and use of AIFC as a regional financial hub.

On 11 July 2025 the kazakh foreign minister Murat Nurtileu signed a US$500 million in Kabul in support of the 115–120 km (71–75 mi) Herat-Torghundi railway line.

=== Afghanistan–Uzbekistan rail service ===
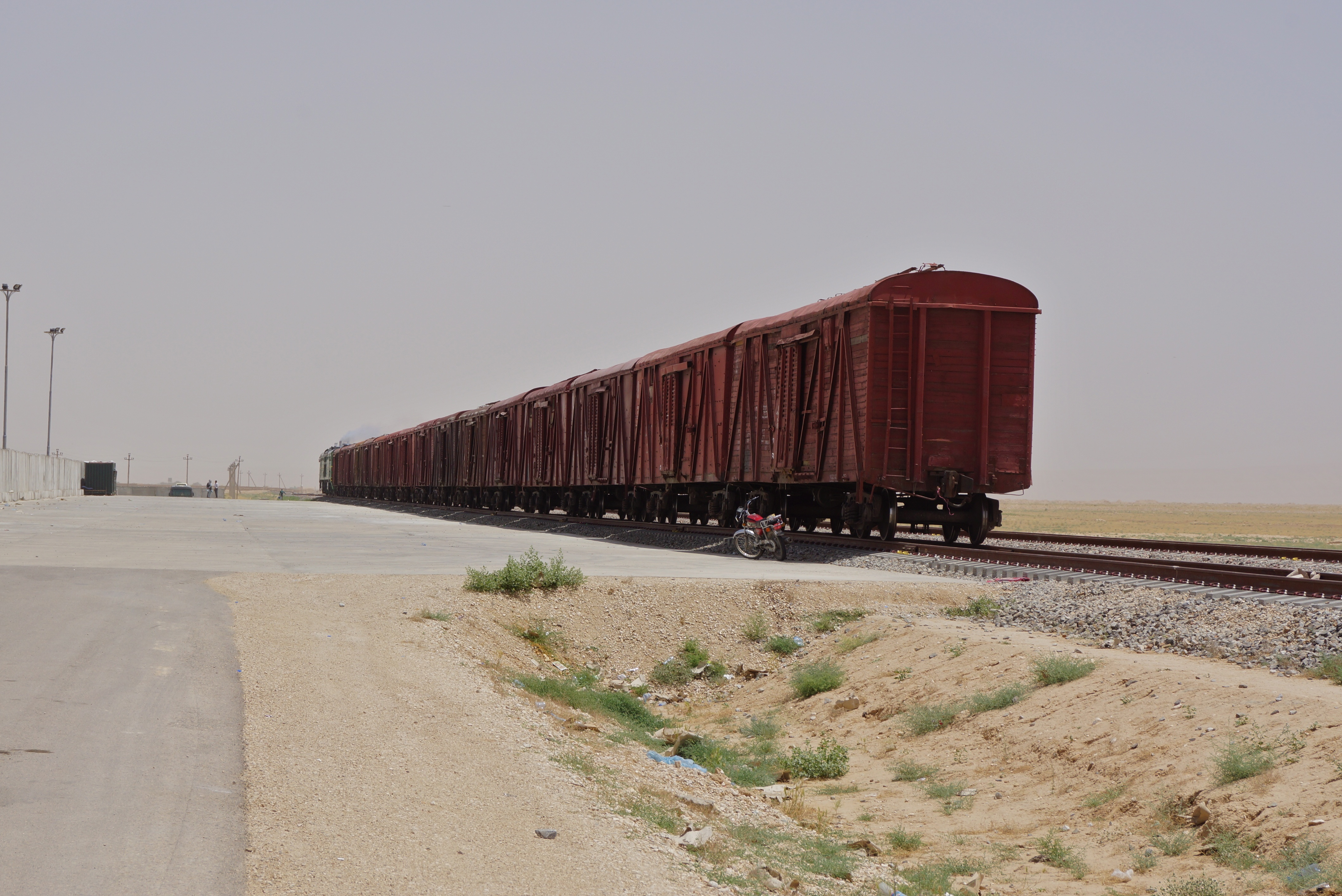
Freight train in Mazar-i-Sharif, Afghanistan

In the early 1980s, the Soviet Union built an approximately 15 km (9.3 mi) rail line from Termez in Uzbekistan to Kheyrabad in Afghanistan, crossing the Amu Darya river on the Afghanistan–Uzbekistan Friendship Bridge.

In January 2010, construction began on a 75 km (47 mi) extension line between Afghanistan and Uzbekistan; this line is also Russian gauge as the first one built by the Soviets. The line, which starts from Hairatan to Maulana Jalaluddin Balkhi International Airport in Mazar-i-Sharif, was originally operated by Uzbekistan's national railway Uzbekiston Temir Yullari for a three-year-term until Afghanistan Railway Authority (ARA) took over responsibility. The first freight services began running around August 2011.

Uzbekistan has pledged in 2018 to part fund a major 657 km (408 mi) rail link from Mazar-i-Sharif west to Herat, which could create a route from Iran via Herat to Central Asia and potentially the Wakhjir Pass in Wakhan District of Badakhshan Province.

=== North–South Corridor ===
In September 2010, China Metallurgical Group Corporation (MCC) signed an agreement with the Afghan Minister of Mines to investigate construction of a north–south railway across Afghanistan, running from Mazar-i-Sharif to Kabul and then to the eastern border town of Torkham. MCC was recently awarded a copper mining concession at Mes Aynak which would be linked to this railway. MCC is constructing a 921 km-long (572 mi) 1,676 mm (5 ft 6 in) gauge railway line that will link Kabul with Uzbekistan in the north and Pakistan in the east.

=== Breaks of gauge ===
The initial phase of railway construction from 2010 sees the creation of five break-of-gauge stations.

- Kandahar 1,676 mm (5 ft 6 in) / 1,435 mm (4 ft 8 1/2 in)
- Khyber Pass 1,676 mm (5 ft 6 in) / 1,435 mm (4 ft 8 1/2 in)
- Torghundi 1,520 mm (4 ft 11 27/32 in) / 1,435 mm (4 ft 8 1/2 in)
- Mazar-i-Sharif 1,520 mm (4 ft 11 27/32 in) / 1,435 mm (4 ft 8 1/2 in)
- Sher Khan Bandar 1,520 mm (4 ft 11 27/32 in) / 1,435 mm (4 ft 8 1/2 in)

In late 2016 updates, there are multiple breaks-of-gauge. These include: 1,520 mm (4 ft 11 27/32 in)/1,676 mm (5 ft 6 in) in the northern area, and 1,435 mm (4 ft 8 1/2 in)/1,520 mm (4 ft 11 27/32 in)/1,676 mm (5 ft 6 in) at Herat.

== See also ==
- Transport in Afghanistan
- Khyber train safari
- Khyber Pass Railway
- Eurasian Land Bridge
- North-South Transport Corridor
- Ashgabat Agreement, a Multimodal transport agreement signed by India, Oman, Iran, Turkmenistan, Uzbekistan and Kazakhstan, for creating an international transport and transit corridor facilitating transportation of goods between Central Asia and the Persian Gulf.
- Broad gauge
- Dual gauge
