= Ashgabat Agreement =

International multimodal transport agreement

The Ashgabat Agreement is a multimodal transport agreement between the governments of Kazakhstan, Uzbekistan, Turkmenistan, Iran, India, Pakistan, and Oman for creating an international transport and transit corridor facilitating transportation of goods between Central Asia and the Persian Gulf. The agreement came into force in April 2016. Ashgabat in Turkmenistan is the depository state for the agreement.

The agreement was originally signed by Iran, Oman, Qatar, Turkmenistan and Uzbekistan on April 25, 2011. Qatar subsequently withdrew from the agreement in 2013, the same year Kazakhstan applied for membership, which was eventually approved in 2015. Pakistan has also joined the Agreement from November 2016. India formally joined in February 2018. As of 2025, Armenia intends to join the agreement.

== Objective ==
The objective of this agreement is to enhance connectivity within Eurasian region and synchronize it with other transport corridors within that region including the International North–South Transport Corridor (INSTC).

== Indian plans ==
The Indian government in March 2016 requested approval for acceding to the agreement. It received consent from the agreement's founding members before getting a formal entry on 3 February 2018.

== Connectivity ==
=== North–South Transport Corridor ===
For enhanced connectivity, the Ashgabat Agreement will also synchronize with the International North–South Transport Corridor encompassing ship, rail including Trans-Caspian railway, and road route for moving freight between India, Russia, Iran, Europe and Central Asia. The route primarily involves moving freight from India, Iran, Azerbaijan and Russia via ship, rail and road.

=== Eurasian Railway Connectivity ===
This agreement will also leverage the Turkmenistan-Afghanistan-Tajikistan (TAT) rail line from 2013, Afghanistan-Turkmenistan-Azerbaijan-Georgia-Turkey transportation corridor in 2014, Iran-Turkmenistan-Kazakhstan railroad and TRACECA (Transport Corridor Europe-Caucasus-Asia) comprising the EU and 14 Eastern European, South Caucasus and Central Asian states.

=== Chabahar-Afghanistan ===
The Chabahar Port in Iran has since 2017 created a trade link from India to Afghanistan, without having to cross through Pakistani territory. The agreement between the three countries was first signed in 2015.

Earlier in 2011, India was finalising a proposal to construct a 900-km railway line that will connect Chabahar port in Iran to the mineral-rich Hajigak region of Afghanistan. It is yet to be implemented.

== See also ==
- Gwadar Port
- China-Pakistan Economic Corridor
- Port of Chabahar
- Lapis Lazuli corridor
- Chabahar-Zaranj-Delaram-Hajigak railway: Indian-Iranian project, would link future Indian iron-ore mining operations at Hajigak to Chabahar, 900 kilometres away
- Turkmenistan–Afghanistan–Pakistan–India Pipeline
- Afghanistan rail network
- Rail transport in Afghanistan
- Rail transport in Armenia
- Rail transport in Kazakhstan
- Rail transport in India
- Rail transport in Iran
- Rail transport in Oman
- Rail transport in Pakistan
- Rail transport in Tajikistan
- Rail transport in Turkmenistan
- Rail transport in Uzbekistan
