= Bakht-ur-Rehman Sharafat =

Afghan politician

Bakht-ur-Rehman Sharafat بخت الرحمن شرافت

Chief Executive Officer of the Afghanistan Railways Authority
- Incumbent
- Assumed office 14 March 2022 (Note: Acting: 14 March 2022 – 15 August 2025)
- Prime Minister: Mohammad Hassan Akhund
- Leader: Hibatullah Akhundzada

Deputy Minister of Public Works for Administration and Finance
- In office 2021 – March 2022
- Leader: Hibatullah Akhundzada

Personal details
- Party: Taliban
- Occupation: Politician, Taliban member

Bakht-ur-Rehman Sharafat is an Afghan Taliban politician who is serving as the head of the railway administration since 14 March 2022. He has also served as Deputy Minister of Administration and Finance at the Ministry of Public Works
