= Andkhoy (city) =

Andkhoy اندخوی
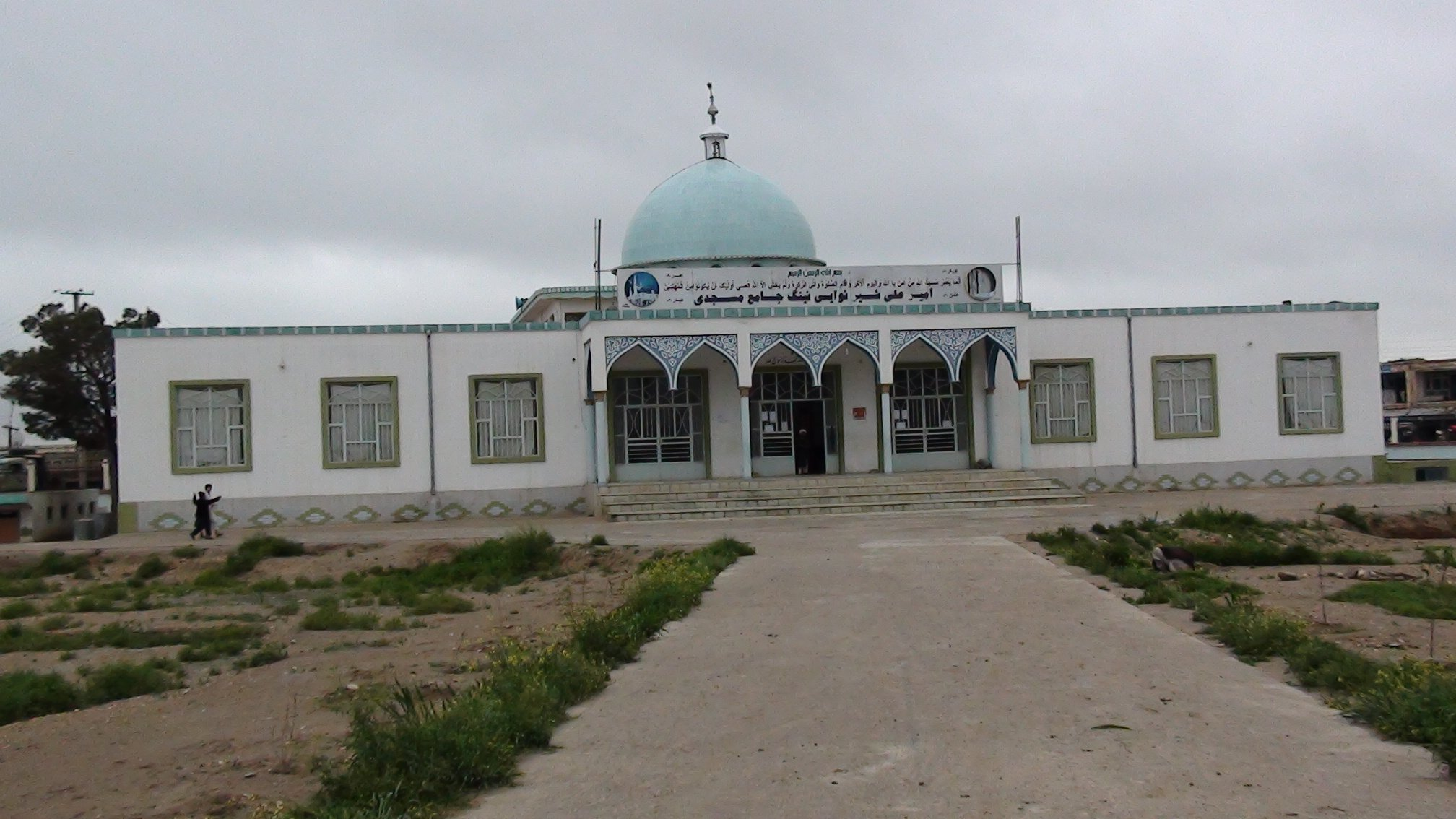
- A mosque in Andkhoy

- Location within Afghanistan
- Coordinates: 36°57′N 65°07′E
- Country: Afghanistan
- Province: Faryab
- District: Andkhoy

Government
- Elevation: 1,037 ft (316 m)

Population (2021)
  - Total: 47,857
- Time zone: + 4.30

Andkhoy (Dari: اندخوی; Pashto: اندخوی ولسوالۍ) is a city in the northern part of Afghanistan, which has a population of about 47,857 people. They include all the major ethnic groups of the country. The city serves as the capital of Andkhoy District in the Faryab Province. It is around 35 kilometres (22 mi) of driving distance southwest from the Aqina–Imamnazar border crossing between Afghanistan and Turkmenistan. There is also a rail station in the city, which was recently opened for import and export purposes with neighboring Turkmenistan. The Sheberghan Airfield in neighboring Jowzjan Province is the closest airport to Andkhoy.

== History ==
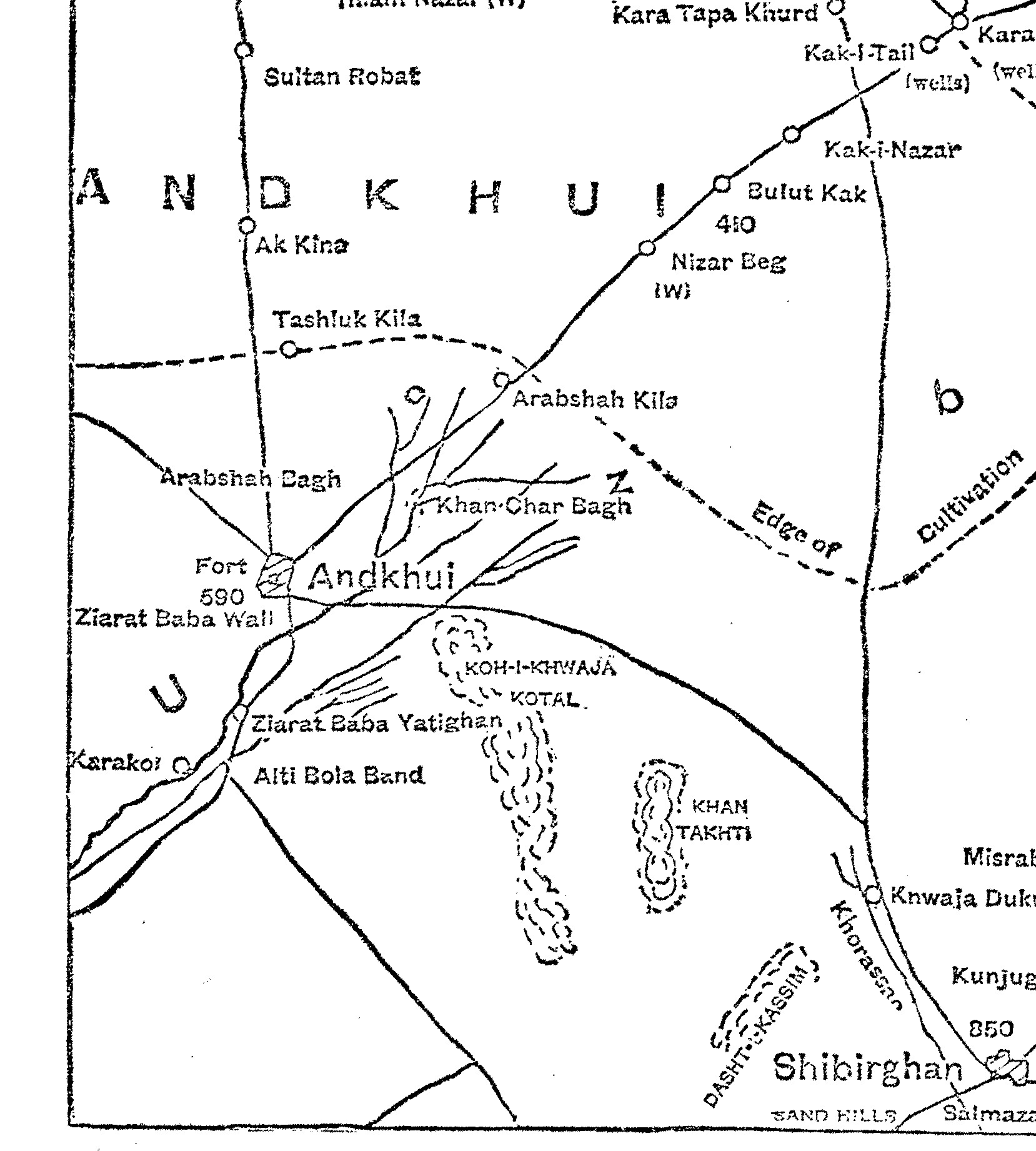
1886 Map of Andkhoy District

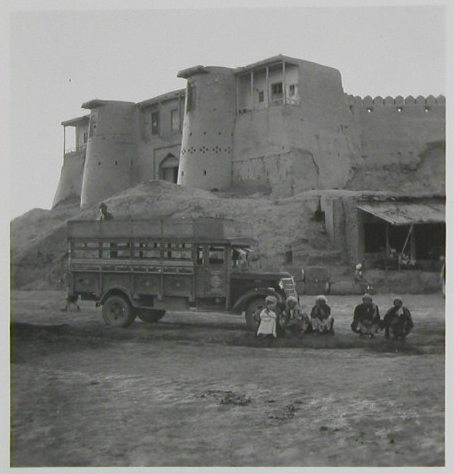
Andkhoy in 1939

The tract in which Andkhoy stands is fertile, but proverbially unhealthy; the Persians accounted it as "a Hell upon Earth" due to its scorching sands, brackish water, flies, and scorpions. Nonetheless, Andkhoy was reported to grow good melons and pomegranates by a mid-17th century author. The city also had a small citadel, a market, a hospice, and a college at that time.

The town was founded by "The Ruwe Arjans" and stands between the northern spurs of the Paropamise and the Oxus; it is 100 km. due west of Balkh, on the edge of the Turkmen desert. The area was an independent Khanate, ruled by members of the Afshar tribe from 1747 to 1880. In 1847, the city was sacked by Yar Mohammad Khan, the ruler of Herat, from which it never recovered.

Renovation of Andkhoy started in 1959, mainly at the eastern parts of the old town. The original plan of the infrastructure was reconditioned and reduced to half its volume of the developments to take place. The property owners refused to sell their land for further developments and the plan consequently failed. The infrastructure remained poor; for example, in 1973 only 13% of the houses had access to electricity, in particular for nights. Lack of sanitary drinking water remained a major problem. The 15 meter deep wells had salty and awfully bad tasting water and the trenches had only twenty days running water in a month. To counteract this, there were water pools to preserve water for bad days to come every month.

== See also ==
- Battle of Andkhud
- Sayyid Baraka
