= Aqina =

Aqina اقينه
- Location within Afghanistan
- Coordinates: 37°13′43″N 65°15′47″E
- Country: Afghanistan
- Province: Faryab Province
- District: Khani Chahar Bagh

Languages
  - Uzbek
  - Turkmen
- Time zone: UTC+4:30

Aqina (Dari: اقينه; Pashto: اقينه), also known as Aqina Port, is a border checkpoint and border crossing in the northern Faryab Province of Afghanistan. It has a train station by the same name, which serves as the second rail service between Afghanistan and neighboring Turkmenistan. Aqina is located in the northern part of Khani Chahar Bagh District, directly adjacent to the border with Turkmenistan.

Security in and around Aqina is provided by the Afghan National Security Forces, which includes the Afghan Border Force. Every visitor or traveler between Afghanistan and Turkmenistan must possess a valid travel visa. The city of Andkhoy is less than 35 kilometres (22 mi) of driving distance to the southwest of Aqina.

== Rail station and heliport ==
Aqina is the southern terminus of a railway line via Imamnazar to Kerki in Turkmenistan, which officially became operational in late 2016. It became one of three railways in Afghanistan.

The rail extension from Aqina to Andkhoy was completed in early 2021. Unknown when it will actually happen, the rail line will eventually become part of a railway corridor through northern Afghanistan.

There is a small dry port with basic facilities in Aqina, which includes a heliport where about a dozen helicopters can be parked.

== See also ==
- Afghanistan–Turkmenistan relations
- Torghundi (second border crossing between Afghanistan and Turkmenistan)
- Hairatan (border crossing between Afghanistan and Uzbekistan)
- Sherkhan Bandar (border crossing between Afghanistan and Tajikistan)
