= Qala-e Mafushad =

Settlement in Afghanistan

Qala-e Mafushad is the easternmost village in Afghanistan, near the Chinese border. It is a Kyrgyz settlement in the Little Pamir, east of Lake Chaqmaqtin, in the Wakhan. Due to its favourable geographic location, it has been proposed as a terminus of a future rail corridor (Corridor 6) of the Afghanistan National Railway Plan, which would allow goods to be transferred through it to Xinjiang.
