= Railway system of the Soviet Union =

Soviet Railways
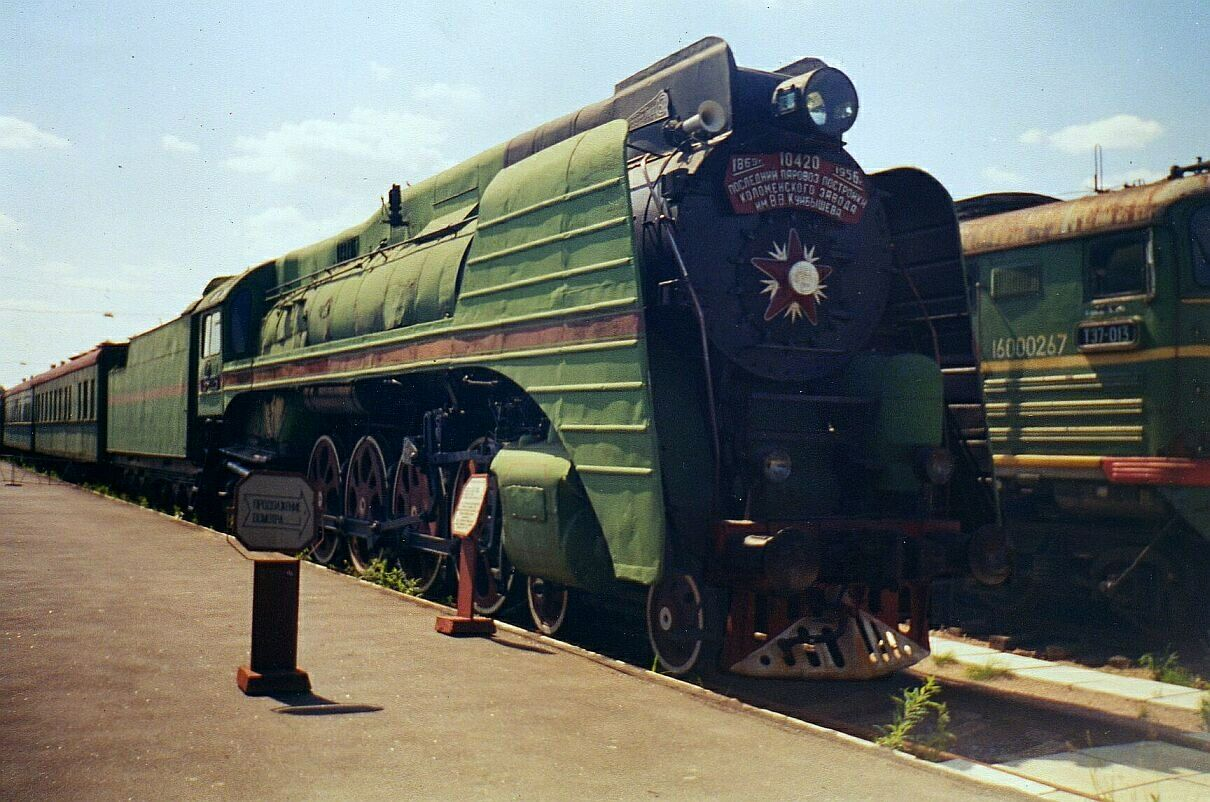
- Steam locomotives, such as the P36, were the quintessential symbol of the Soviet Railways.

Overview
- Headquarters: Moscow
- Reporting mark: SZhD, SZD
- Locale: Soviet Union
- Dates of operation: 1922–1991
- Predecessor: RIZhD, JGR
- Successor: RŽD, UZ, BCh, ADDY, SR, HYU, LG, CFM, EVR, LZD, KTZ, OTY, TZD, KTJ

Technical
- Track gauge: 1,520 mm (4 ft 11 27/32 in)
- Electrification: 3 kV DC, 25 kV AC, 50 Hz
- Length: 147,400 km (91,600 mi)

Soviet Railways (Russian: Советские железные дороги (СЖД)) was the state owned national railway system of the Soviet Union, headquartered in Moscow. The railway started operations in December 1922, shortly after the formation of the Soviet Union. Soviet Railways greatly upgraded and expanded the Russian Imperial Railways to meet the demands of the new country. It operated until the dissolution of the Soviet Union in December 1991.

The Soviet Railways were the largest unified railway in the world and the backbone of the Soviet Union's economy. The railway was directly under the control of the Ministry of Railways in the Soviet Union.

After the dissolution of the Soviet Union, Soviet Railways split into fifteen different national railways belonging to the respective countries. After the end of Soviet Railways, however, rail transport in the former Soviet states greatly declined and has not recovered to its former efficiency to this day. By mileage, Russian Railways was the primary successor of Soviet Railways. Newly-independent countries following the breakup, such as those in Central Asia, inherited the Soviet infrastructure.

== Successor railways ==
Railway	Native name	Country	Year started	Length (in km)	Notes
Armenian Railways	Հայկական երկաթուղի Haykakan yerkat’ughi (HYU)	Armenia	1992–2008	845 km	Railway operations and infrastructure taken over by South Caucasus Railway (Հարավկովկասյան երկաթուղի, Haravkovkasyan yerkat’ughi) in 2008, a subsidiary of Russian Railways.
Azerbaijan Railways	Azərbaycan Dəmir Yolları (ADY)	Azerbaijan	1991	2,932 km	
Belarusian Railway	Беларуская чыгунка Belaruskaya Chygunka (BCh)	Belarus	1992	5,490 km	
Estonian Railways	Eesti Raudtee (EVR)	Estonia	1992	816 km	Train operations have since been separated as Elron, Edelaraudtee, Operail and GoRail.
Georgian Railways	საქართველოს რკინიგზა sakartvelos rk'inigza (SR)	Georgia	1992	1,513 km	In the de facto independent Abkhazia, the railway has been operated by Abkhaz Railway since 1992.
Kazakhstan Railways	Қазақстан Темір Жолы; Kazakhstan Temir Zholy (KTZ)	Kazakhstan	1997	15,000 km	
Kyrgyz Railways	Кыргыз Темир Жолу; Kyrgyz Temir Jolu (KTJ)	Kyrgyzstan	1992	417 km	
Latvian Railways	Latvijas dzelzceļš (LDz)	Latvia	1992	2,269 km	Passenger operations have since been taken over by the separate company Pasažieru vilciens (PV).
Lithuanian Railways	Lietuvos geležinkeliai (LTG)	Lithuania	1991	1,766 km	
Moldovan Railways	Calea Ferată din Moldova (CFM)	Moldova	1992	1,156 km	Railway operations in the de facto independent Transnistria are operated by Transnistrian Railway (Приднестровская железная дорога, Pridnestrovskaya zheleznaya doroga).
Russian Railways	Российские железные дороги Rossiyskie zheleznye dorogi (RŽD)	Russia	1992	85,281 km	
Tajik Railways	Роӽи оӽани Тоҷикистон; Rohi ohani Toçikiston	Tajikistan	1992	616 km	
Türkmendemirýollary	Demirýollary	Turkmenistan	1997	4,980 km	
Ukrainian Railways	Укрзалізниця; Ukrzaliznytsia (UZ)	Ukraine	1991	22,300 km	
Uzbek Railways	Oʻzbekiston Temir Yoʻllari (OTY)	Uzbekistan	1994	4,669 km	

== See also ==
- Rail transport in the Soviet Union
- Rail transport in Ukraine
- Ukrainian Railways
- Russian Railways
- History of rail transport in Russia
- Transport in the Soviet Union
- Industrial railway
- Sibirjak
- Russian Railway Museum, in Saint Petersburg, which is home to former Soviet locomotives and other machinery.
