= Five Nations Railway Corridor =

Proposed rail link in Central Asia from Iran to China

Overview
- Status: Running
- Termini: Kashgar, China; Khaf, Iran

Technical
- Line length: 2,100 km (1,300 mi)

The Five Nations Railway Corridor or FNRC or Five States Railway Corridor is a proposed rail link in Central Asia between Iran in the west, through Afghanistan, Tajikistan, Kyrgyzstan, and reaching China in the east. Around half of the length of the railway would pass through northern Afghanistan. A preliminary agreement for developing the FNRC project was signed in the Tajik capital Dushanbe in December 2014 and has moved sluggishly since then. The project with a length of 2100 kilometres will run through five countries- China, Tajikistan, Kyrgyzstan, Afghanistan, and Iran, connecting China with the Iranian ports of Chabahar and Bandar Abbas. About 50 percent of the total railway line, roughly 1148 kilometres, will cross through Afghanistan's Kunduz, Balkh, Jawozjan, Faryab, Badghis, and Herat provinces. A preliminary agreement for the railway link was first signed in 2014, with costs estimated at US$2 billion, however construction of the main section through Afghanistan was uncertain due to the conflict in Afghanistan.

== Background ==
On 9 May 2023, the first trial run of cargo from Iran to Afghanistan via the Khaf-Herat railway was completed. This shipment included 17 wagons that transferred 655 tons of railway equipment that will be used in the further construction of the rail line. The Khaf-Herat railway is 225 kilometers long, with 140 km of the railway track traversing Afghanistan and the remaining 85 km running through Iran. The construction of the Khaf-Herat railway line, which links Khaf in eastern Iran with Herat in western Afghanistan, began back in 2007. In 2007, work started on an Iranian government funded railway connecting Khaf in Iran across the border with Herat in Afghanistan. This line is part of the proposed railway route. The section between Khaf and Ghurian (Afghanistan) was inaugurated in 2020. A railway link between Afghanistan's northern border town of Hairatan and southern Uzbekistan opened in 2011, but has only been used incidentally for trains originating from China.

Plans for the railway line are supported by the Chinese government, as part of its Belt and Road Initiative, and by Iran, which is becoming an increasingly important trading partner for Afghanistan. The Asian Development Bank has committed funding for the Afghan section of the line.

On 22 October 2025 Afghan, Iranian and Turkish officials discussed the Herat-Mazar-i-Sharif section of the FNRC at the UIC summit in Istanbul, a USD $10 million feasibility study was agreed with completion scheduled in March 2026.

In January 2026, the Kazakh government via its ambassador in Pakistan offered to fully finance the construction of a railway connecting Kazakhstan to Pakistani ports via Afghanistan.

== Route ==
The route of the Iran-China railway link discussed in 2015 is as follows:

- Tehran, Iran
- Ashgabat, Turkmenistan
- Tashkent, Uzbekistan
- Samarkand, Uzbekistan
- Bishkek, Kyrgyzstan
- Almaty, Kazakhstan
- Yining, China
- Urumqi, China

== Gauge ==
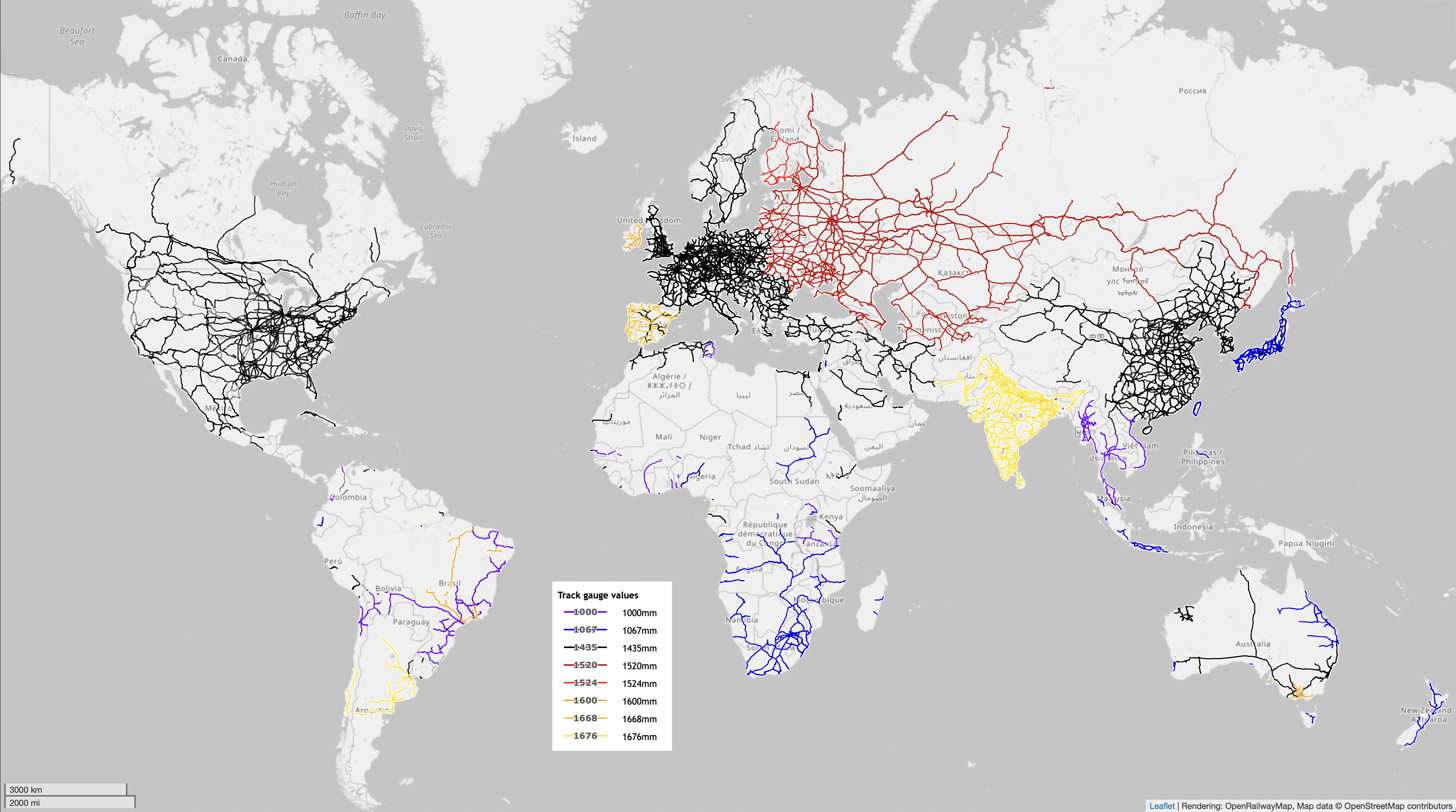
Map of the world's railways showing the different gauges in use.: 3 ft gauge (914 mm); Meter gauge (1,000 mm); Cape gauge (1,067 mm); Standard gauge (1,435 mm); Russian gauge (1,520 mm); Five foot gauge (1,524 mm); Irish gauge (1,600 mm); Iberian gauge (1,668 mm); Indian gauge (1,676 mm)

Trains between China and Europe currently always have to pass a break of gauge. The proposed route of the Five Nations Railway Corridor would bridge the gap between the Chinese and the European/Central Asian standard gauge rail networks. However, the new tracks will not use standard gauge only. A section in Kazakhstan uses Russian gauge, while an Uzbekistan-built section in Afghanistan uses five foot gauge.

== Impact ==
The railway is expected to especially benefit the landlocked Afghanistan, which would gain direct access to the Iranian seaports of Chabahar and Bandar Abbas. Through Iran, the line can connect to the Turkish railway network. Tajikistan and Kyrgyzstan would also benefit from access to Iran's ports, and would reduce their dependency on neighbors Turkmenistan, Uzbekistan and also on Russia.

== See also ==
- China–Kyrgyzstan–Uzbekistan railway
- Rail transport in Afghanistan
- Mazar-i-Sharif-Kabul-Peshawar railway line
