= China–Kyrgyzstan–Uzbekistan railway =

International railway under construction between China, Kyrgyzstan and Uzbekistan

Overview
- Native name: 中吉乌铁路; Кытай–Кыргызстан–Өзбекстан темир жолу Xitoy–Qirgʻiziston–Oʻzbekiston temir yoʻli
- Status: Under construction
- Owner: China–Kyrgyzstan–Uzbekistan Railway Company (Kyrgyz section)
- Locale: China, Kyrgyzstan and Uzbekistan
- Termini: Kashgar, China; Andijan, Uzbekistan
- Stations: 20 planned in the Kyrgyz section

Service
- Type: International railway
- Operator: To be determined

History
- Opened: 2030 (target)

Technical
- Line length: 530 km (330 mi)
- Num of tracks: 1
- Track gauge: 1,435 mm (56.5 in) (standard gauge) (Kashgar–Makmal); 1,520 mm (60 in) (Russian gauge) (Makmal–Andijan)
- Electrification: None initially; provision for future electrification
- Operating speed: 120 km/h (75 mph)

The China–Kyrgyzstan–Uzbekistan railway (CKU railway; Chinese: 中吉乌铁路; Kyrgyz: Кытай–Кыргызстан–Өзбекстан темир жолу; Uzbek: Xitoy–Qirgʻiziston–Oʻzbekiston temir yoʻli) is an international railway under construction between China, Kyrgyzstan and Uzbekistan. It is planned to run from Kashgar in Xinjiang through the Torugart Pass, Makmal and Jalal-Abad in Kyrgyzstan to Andijan in eastern Uzbekistan.

The railway is intended to provide a new east–west transport corridor linking western China with Central Asia and, through connecting railway networks, with the Middle East and Europe. It has been promoted by the three governments as part of the Belt and Road Initiative.

Published figures for the length of the railway have varied as the project has advanced through feasibility studies and detailed design. A 2025 account by Railway Gazette International described a 523-kilometre (325 mi) route, including 213 kilometres (132 mi) in China, 260 kilometres (160 mi) in Kyrgyzstan and 50 kilometres (31 mi) in Uzbekistan. By 2026, reports on the final engineering plan placed the total length at approximately 530 to 533 kilometres (329 to 331 mi), with about 304 to 305 kilometres (189 to 190 mi) in Kyrgyzstan.

Plans for the railway date to the 1990s, but the project remained under discussion for almost three decades because of disputes over financing, route selection and railway gauge, as well as political and geopolitical considerations. The governments signed an intergovernmental agreement on 6 June 2024, followed by a ceremonial launch of construction on 27 December 2024. Construction of three major tunnels began on 29 April 2025, and the project entered active construction during 2025.

== History ==
=== Early proposals ===
The railway was first proposed in the 1990s following the dissolution of the Soviet Union and the independence of the Central Asian republics. China, Kyrgyzstan and Uzbekistan signed a memorandum concerning the railway in 1997, but the project made little progress during the following decades.

The project was discussed intermittently during the 2000s and 2010s. Among the principal unresolved questions were the route through Kyrgyzstan, construction costs and financing, and whether the railway through Kyrgyzstan should use China's 1,435 mm (56.5 in) standard gauge or the 1,520 mm (60 in) gauge inherited from the Soviet railway system.

Kyrgyzstan also sought a route that would provide domestic transport benefits rather than function solely as an international transit line. The mountainous geography of the country made this considerably more expensive than more direct alternatives, as the selected alignment requires numerous long tunnels and bridges.

Russia's attitude towards the project was also cited as a geopolitical factor during the lengthy negotiations. The line would allow freight between China and markets farther west to travel on a route that does not pass through Russia. Interest in developing alternative Eurasian transport corridors increased following the Russian invasion of Ukraine in 2022.

=== Renewed negotiations ===
The project gained momentum in the early 2020s. During 2022 and 2023, the three countries undertook further negotiations and feasibility work on the proposed route. By 2023, the parties had reached agreement on proceeding with a route through Torugart, Makmal and Jalal-Abad.

On 6 June 2024, China, Kyrgyzstan and Uzbekistan signed a trilateral intergovernmental agreement establishing a legal and institutional framework for construction of the railway. The agreement specified the Kashgar–Torugart–Makmal–Jalal-Abad–Andijan corridor and provided for the establishment of a joint project company in Kyrgyzstan.

Under the agreed division of responsibilities, China is responsible for construction on Chinese territory, Uzbekistan for upgrading the relevant railway infrastructure within Uzbekistan, and the joint project company for financing, construction and subsequent operation of the new railway in Kyrgyzstan.

A ceremonial launch was held at Tosh-Kutchu in the Jalal-Abad Region of Kyrgyzstan on 27 December 2024. Kyrgyz President Sadyr Japarov attended the ceremony, together with representatives of the Chinese and Uzbek governments. At that stage, construction of the main Kyrgyz section was scheduled to begin in July 2025 and to take approximately six years.

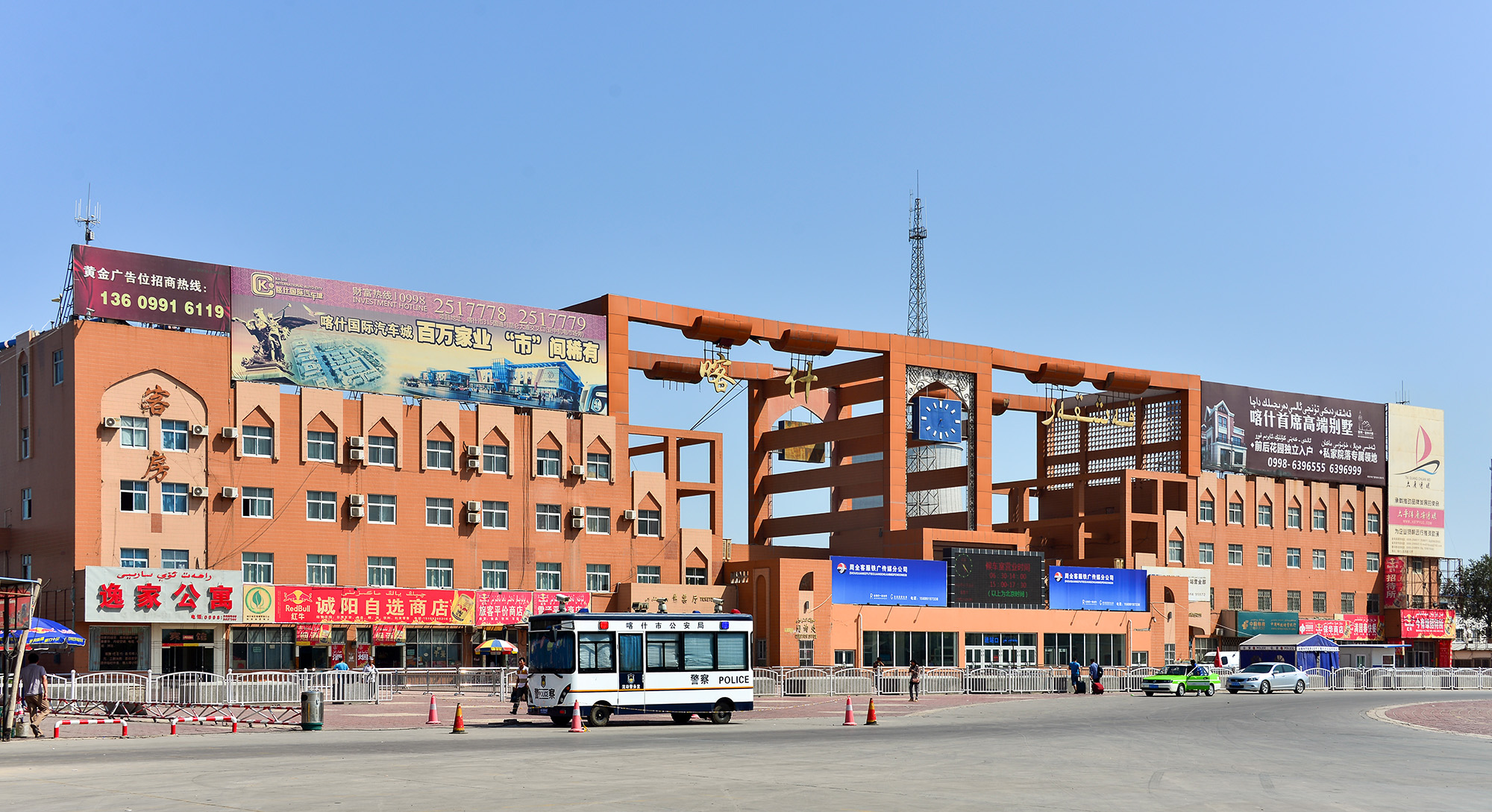
Kashgar Railway Station

== Route ==
The selected alignment runs west from Kashgar in China's Xinjiang region to the Chinese–Kyrgyz border at the Torugart Pass. It then crosses Kyrgyzstan through the Tian Shan mountains, following a corridor through Arpa, Kosh-Dobo and Makmal before turning southwest towards Jalal-Abad. From there, the line reaches the Kyrgyz–Uzbek border and connects with the Uzbek railway network towards Andijan.

The Kyrgyz section crosses primarily mountainous terrain in Naryn Region and Jalal-Abad Region. Much of the alignment in Kyrgyzstan requires new infrastructure through areas without an existing railway. The line is also intended to improve connections between parts of Kyrgyzstan whose railway infrastructure is currently fragmented.

From Andijan, freight can continue through the existing Central Asian railway network. The railway has been discussed as a possible feeder into westbound corridors towards the Caspian Sea, Turkey and Europe, including connections with the Trans-Caspian International Transport Route. Connections with prospective southbound corridors towards Afghanistan and Pakistan have also been discussed, although those routes remain under development.

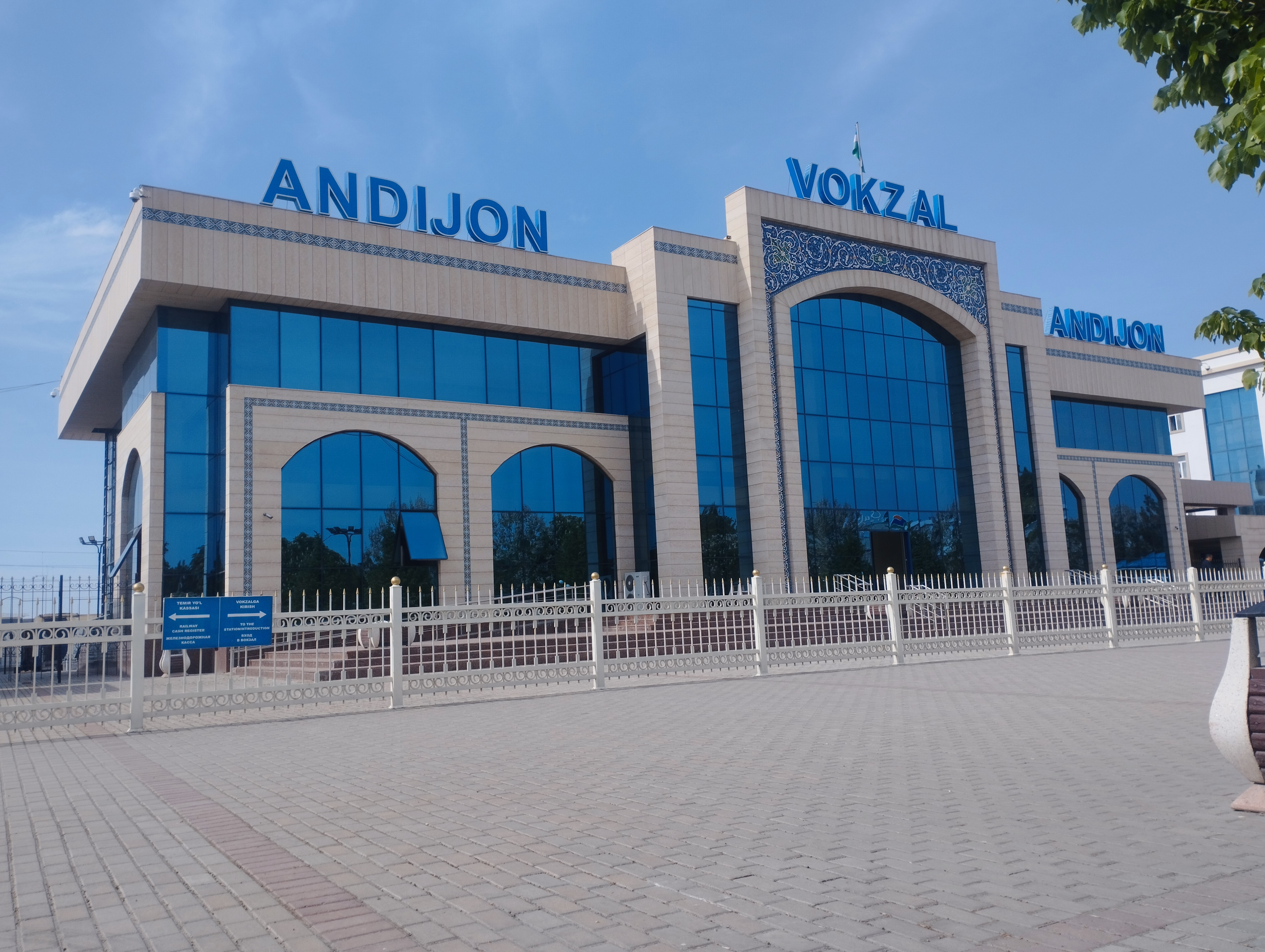
Andijon Station

== Engineering and infrastructure ==
=== Track gauge ===
A major technical issue during the project's development was the difference in railway gauge. China operates a 1,435 mm (56.5 in) standard-gauge network, while Kyrgyzstan and Uzbekistan inherited the 1,520 mm (60 in) broad-gauge railway standard of the former Soviet Union.

The final design uses both gauges. The line from China through Torugart to Makmal is to use 1,435 mm (56.5 in) standard gauge, while the section west of Makmal towards Jalal-Abad and Uzbekistan is to use 1,520 mm (60 in) gauge.

A break of gauge and transshipment complex is therefore planned at Makmal. According to the 2026 project description, the Torugart–Makmal standard-gauge section is approximately 160 kilometres (99 mi) long and the Makmal–Jalal-Abad broad-gauge section approximately 145 kilometres (90 mi). The Makmal facility is intended to handle cargo transshipment, train formation, container handling, weighing and the transfer of rolling stock between the two gauges.

=== Bridges and tunnels ===
The mountainous Kyrgyz section is the most engineering-intensive part of the project. By 2026, the design included 50 bridges and 29 tunnels. The tunnels have a combined length of approximately 104.83 kilometres (65.14 mi), and several exceed 5 kilometres (3.1 mi) in length.

Three of the most important tunnelling projects are the Fergana range, Naryn No. 1 and Koshtet tunnels. Construction of these three works began on 29 April 2025, marking the transition of the project into main-line construction.

Earlier design figures varied. At the December 2024 launch ceremony, Uzbek officials referred to 20 stations, 42 bridges and 25 tunnels in Kyrgyzstan, while other contemporary reports cited higher figures. These numbers were subsequently revised as engineering design progressed.

The railway is designed initially as a single-track line suitable for diesel operation at up to 120 km/h (75 mph). Provision is to be made for future electrification. The projected long-term freight capacity is approximately 15 million tonnes per year. Passenger services have also been considered, although freight transport is the primary stated purpose of the project.

== Construction ==
The ceremony held on 27 December 2024 was described as the official launch of the project, although large-scale main-line works were not initially scheduled to begin until 2025.

On 29 April 2025, construction began on the Fergana Mountain, Naryn No. 1 and Koshtet tunnels in Kyrgyzstan. China State Railway Group described the commencement of the three tunnels as the beginning of substantive main-line construction.

By July 2025, the CKU railway was under active construction. By July 2026, excavation was reported to be taking place on all 29 planned tunnels, while earthworks had begun on several sections of the railway. Approximately 192 kilometres (119 mi) of temporary construction roads had been built, together with power infrastructure serving construction sites.

Around 5,000 workers were employed on the project in Kyrgyzstan in mid-2026, including approximately 2,000 Kyrgyz citizens. Kyrgyz officials were aiming to complete approximately five per cent of the railway by the end of 2026.

The original construction programme announced in late 2024 envisaged a six-year construction period. In March 2026, Japarov stated that the target was to complete the railway in 2030. Uzbek railway officials have suggested that construction could potentially be completed earlier, although 2030 remains the publicly stated target.

In September 2026, Chinese officials announced the successful completion of the first tunnel of the Kyrgyz section.

== Project company and financing ==
A joint project company, commonly referred to as the China–Kyrgyzstan–Uzbekistan Railway Company, was established in Kyrgyzstan to implement the Kyrgyz section of the railway. China holds 51 per cent of the venture, while Kyrgyzstan and Uzbekistan each hold 24.5 per cent.

The company is responsible for financing, construction and operation of the Kyrgyz section. China Railway International, a subsidiary of China State Railway Group, is the leading Chinese participant in project implementation.

Its estimated cost has generally been reported at approximately US$4.7 billion, although earlier public estimates for the wider project had reached approximately US$8 billion.

The principal financing package was finalised in December 2025. On 16 December, the joint project company and a consortium of Chinese banks signed the financing agreement. Under the arrangement, approximately US$2.3 billion—about half of the project's estimated cost—is being provided as a 35-year Chinese loan to the joint venture.

The remainder is to be provided through equity contributions by the three shareholders broadly corresponding to their ownership shares, with China holding 51 per cent and Kyrgyzstan and Uzbekistan 24.5 per cent each. Reports have differed over the precise amount of Kyrgyzstan's own contribution and how much of it will ultimately be financed from the Kyrgyz state budget or through additional borrowing.

== Economic and strategic significance ==
The railway is intended to create a shorter connection between western China and Central Asia and to provide an additional Eurasian freight route towards the Middle East and Europe. Estimates of the saving have varied depending on the route used for comparison. Published estimates have suggested a reduction of approximately 700 to 900 kilometres (430 to 560 mi) and a saving of around seven to ten days in freight transit time compared with some existing routes.

For Kyrgyzstan, the project will create the country's first direct railway connection with China and increase its role as a transit state between China and Uzbekistan. Kyrgyz officials have argued that the railway could encourage the development of logistics centres, warehousing, mining and processing industries along the route, as well as provide employment in Naryn and Jalal-Abad regions.

Uzbekistan is expected to gain a more direct rail route to China and improved access to east–west transport networks. From Andijan, traffic could continue westwards through the Uzbek railway system and potentially connect with routes towards the Caspian Sea, Iran, Turkey and Europe.

The CKU railway is also regarded as an alternative to Eurasian corridors running north through Kazakhstan and Russia. However, analysts have noted that the railway will enter an increasingly competitive freight market that includes the Trans-Caspian Middle Corridor and established northern routes. Its mountainous alignment and resulting capacity and operating costs may mean that it functions as a complementary or feeder corridor rather than replacing existing Eurasian routes.

== Challenges and controversies ==
=== Financing and debt ===
Financing was one of the principal reasons for the project's long delay. Kyrgyzstan has considerably fewer financial resources than China, while the mountainous section within Kyrgyzstan is the most expensive part of the railway to construct.

Before the final financing package was agreed, estimates of Kyrgyzstan's required contribution and the terms of Chinese lending varied substantially. This generated debate in Kyrgyzstan over public debt and the distribution of financial risks and benefits.

The December 2025 financing agreement resolved the principal project-level lending arrangements, although debate over Kyrgyzstan's own financing obligations has continued.

=== Engineering and environmental issues ===
The railway traverses high-altitude and seismically active parts of the Tian Shan. The large number of bridges and tunnels makes the Kyrgyz section technically difficult to construct and potentially expensive to maintain.

Environmental concerns have included possible effects of tunnelling, blasting, road construction and other works on mountain ecosystems and water resources. In 2026, contractors working on the railway were reported to have been fined by Kyrgyz environmental authorities for violations.

=== Land acquisition and resettlement ===
Land acquisition and compensation have also become issues during construction. According to reporting in 2026, 214 houses in Kyrgyzstan were expected to be demolished for the project, most of them in Jalal-Abad Region. Property assessments and compensation procedures were under way, with some affected residents disputing the amounts offered.

=== Geopolitical considerations ===
The railway provides a potential China–Central Asia–Europe transport route independent of Russian territory. Russia had historically been described as reluctant to support the project, although its opposition diminished as negotiations accelerated in the early 2020s.

Analysts have also noted that the railway does not automatically make the southern corridor commercially dominant. Its competitiveness will depend on freight volumes, border procedures, tariffs, transshipment costs at Makmal and the development of connecting infrastructure beyond Uzbekistan.

== See also ==
- Belt and Road Initiative
- China–Central Asia–West Asia Economic Corridor
- Trans-Caspian International Transport Route
- Five Nations Railway Corridor
- Rail transport in China
- Rail transport in Kyrgyzstan
- Rail transport in Uzbekistan
