= Sayyid Baraka =

Mongol spiritual teacher (1343–1403)

- Born: 1343
- Died: 1403 (aged 59–60)
- Occupations: Holy man of Tirmidh, Fief of Andkhoy
- Known for: Mongol spiritual teacher to Timur

Sayyid Baraka (1343–1403) was a holy man of the commercial city of Tirmidh, and spiritual teacher and friend to the 14th century Central Asian conqueror Timur. Timur is buried facing Baraka in the same tomb.

== Meeting Timur ==
In 1370 Timur was traversing a mountain pass known as the Iron Gate south of the Qashqadaryo (river), where he encountered Sayyid Baraka, a Meccan who claimed descent from Muhammad. Baraka presented Timur with a banner and a large drum, symbols associated with rulership, and predicted his future success. Timur publicized these predictions and brought Baraka into his court along with other influential religious figures in Mawarannahr.

== Later life ==
Baraka subsequently served as Timur's spiritual adviser and remained closely associated with him throughout his life.

Baraka was a fief of Andkhoy in Afghanistan, a town given to him by Timur.

Timur is buried facing Baraka in the same mausoleum, Gur-e Amir, at Samarkand.
