= Dishu, Afghanistan =

Location in Helmand Province, Afghanistan

Dishu دیشو
- Location in Afghanistan
- Coordinates: 30°26′4″N 63°19′6″E
- Country: Afghanistan
- Province: Helmand Province
- District: Dishu District
- Elevation: 1,962 ft (598 m)

Population (2007)
  - Total: 9,482
- Time zone: UTC+4:30

The village of Dishu (also Deshu, Deh Šu) is the center of Dishu District in Helmand Province, Afghanistan. Like other settlements in the district, it is located near the Helmand River on 30.4344°N 63.3183°E at 598 m altitude. The population was 9,482 according to calculations for 2007.

== See also ==
- Helmand Province
