= Bahramcha =

Location in Helmand Province, Afghanistan

Bahramcha بھرامچه
- Town
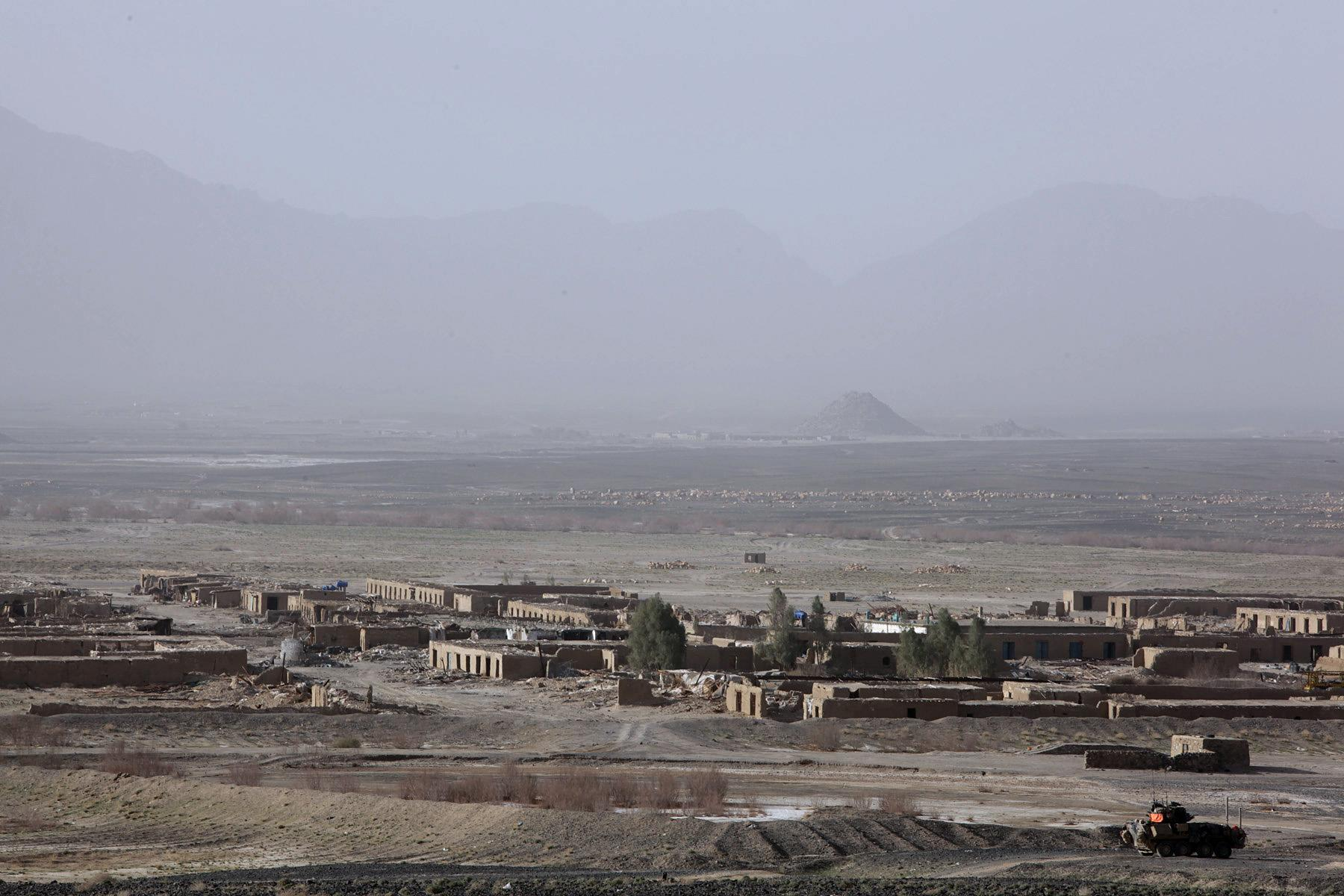
- Bahramcha in 2011 with heavy destruction from US bombardment visible

- Location in Afghanistan
- Coordinates: 29°25′N 64°3′E
- Country: Afghanistan
- Province: Helmand
- District: Dishu
- Elevation: 1,546 m (5,072 ft)

Population
  - Total: 19,032
- Time zone: UTC+04:30 (Afghanistan Time)

Bahramcha (Pashto: بھرامچه; Dari: بھرام چاه) is the capital of Dishu District in Afghanistan's southern Helmand Province. It has an estimated population of about 19,032 people. There is an official border post near the Durand Line (Afghanistan-Pakistan border), which is one of the routes used by the Afghans in Pakistan to enter Afghanistan.

== Destruction caused by fighting ==
During the War in Afghanistan (2001–2021), the town was repeatedly attacked by US as well as allied forces.

Early in 2009, fights between government and taliban forces with support from British and Estonian troops occurred in the area, with US bombers dropping 500lb bombs on structures used by the Taliban forces.

During the night leading to December 1, 2017, residential areas were bombarded. According to media reports based on government information, dozens of civilians were killed and considerable destruction was caused to structures in the area.

== Smuggling route ==
During the Afghanistan war, Bahramcha was sometimes used by suspected Taliban members to export poppy to Pakistan for processing, becoming an important center of the Helmand opium trade. It is claimed that the 3rd Light Armored Reconnaissance killed over 100 Taliban fighters during a raid in 2011, which badly crippled that trade.
