= Sangbor, Afghanistan =

Sangbor
- Location in Afghanistan
- Coordinates: 35°1′39″N 62°18′20″E
- Country: Afghanistan
- Province: Badghis Province
- Time zone: + 4.30

Sangbor is a village in Badghis Province in northwestern Afghanistan.
