= Uzbek Railways =

National railway system

JSC Uzbekistan Railways „Oʻzbekiston temir yoʻllari“ Aksiyadorlik Jamiyati

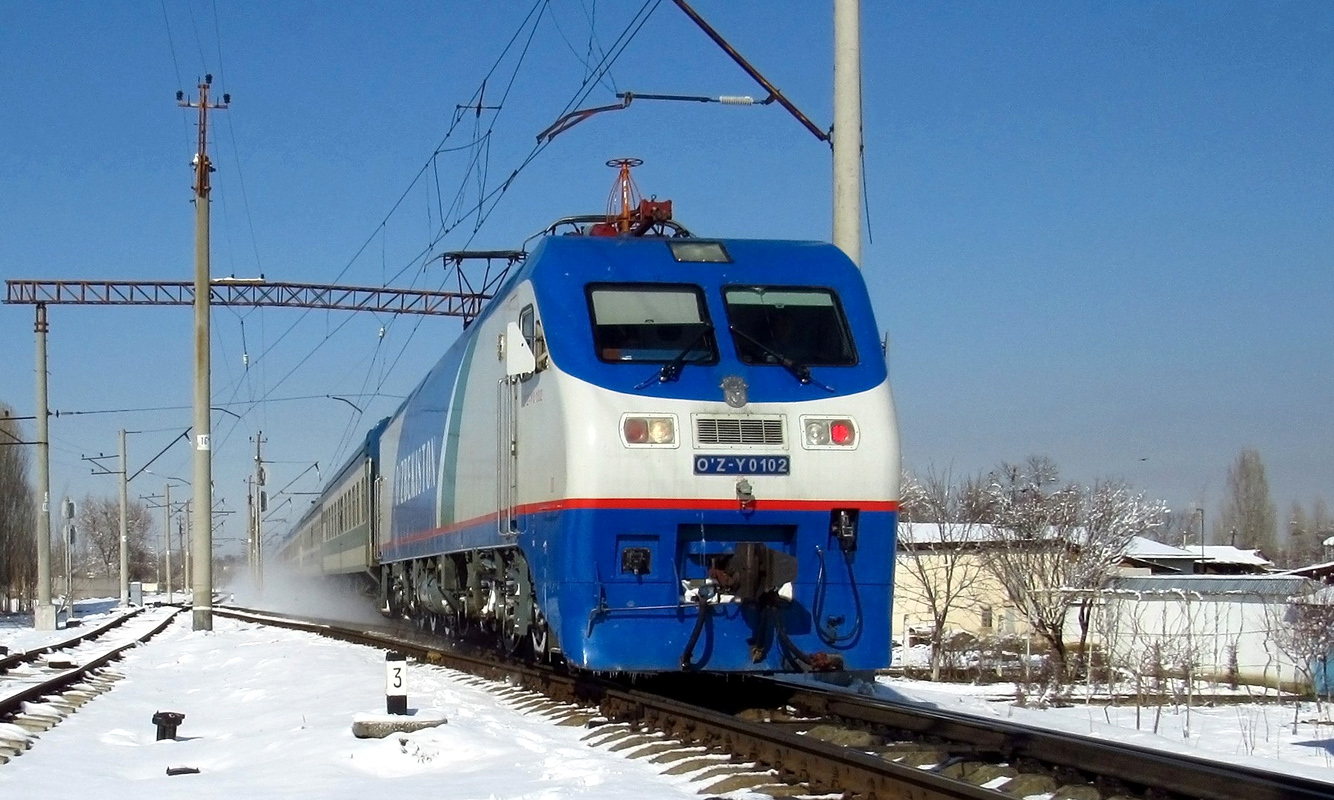
- Type: Joint-stock company
- Industry: railway
- Predecessor: Soviet Railways
- Founded: 1994; 32 years ago
- Headquarters: Tashkent, Uzbekistan
- Area served: Uzbekistan
- Services: Passenger; rail transport; cargo; high-speed rail
- Owner: Government of Uzbekistan
- Number of employees: 54,700 (2017)
- Website: railway.uz

Uzbekistan Railways (Note: Uzbek: Oʻzbekiston Temir Yoʻllari, cyrillized: Ўзбекистон Темир Йўллари, arabized: اۉزبېكستان تېمير يۉللرى) is the national railway company of the Republic of Uzbekistan. It owns and manages all infrastructure and operating freight and passenger train services in the country, and has a near-monopoly on long-distance train travel in Uzbekistan. It is a vertically integrated state-owned stock company, formed in 1994 to operate railways within Uzbekistan. As of March 2017, the total length of its main railway network is 4,669 km (2,446 km of which is electrified).

== Infrastructure ==
Oʻzbekiston Temir Yoʻllari Ўзбекистон Темир Йўллари Uzbekistan Railways

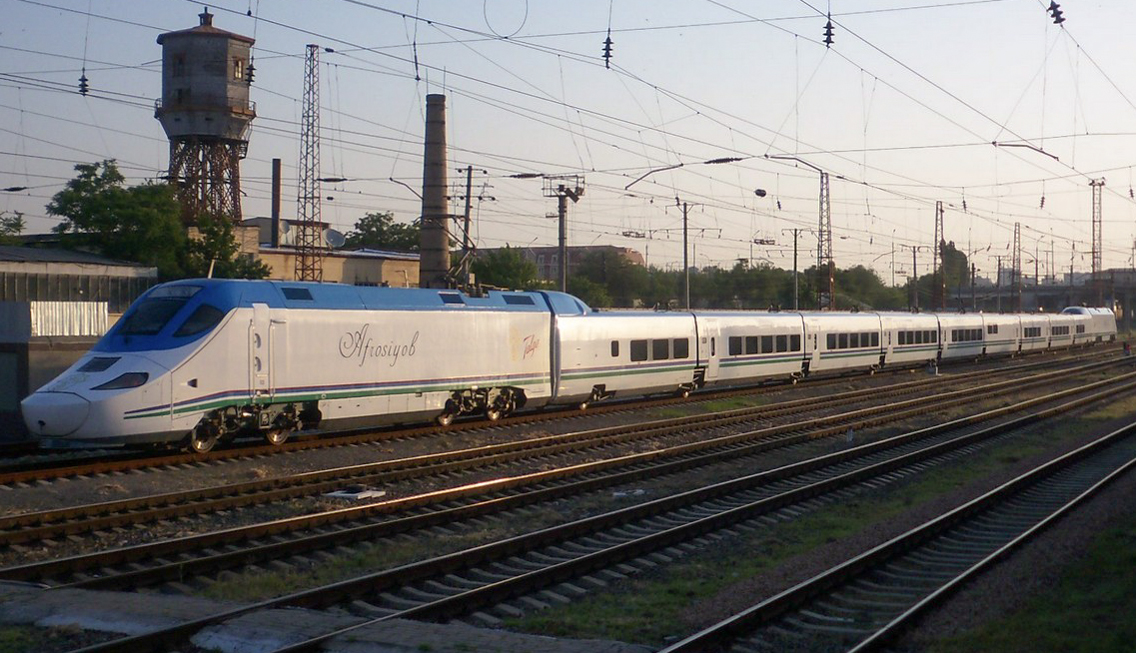

Overview
- Headquarters: Tashkent
- Reporting mark: OTY
- Locale: Uzbekistan
- Dates of operation: 1994–present
- Predecessor: Soviet Railways

Technical
- Track gauge: 1,520 mm (4 ft 11 27/32 in)
- Electrification: 25 kV AC
- Length: 4,669 km (2,901 mi)

Other
- Website: railway.uz

4,714 kilometres (2,929 mi) rail network carries about 40% of total freight volume in the country, and about 4% of the total land passenger volume. Around 2,350 km of the network is currently electrified, as of 2019.

=== Branches ===
Uzbekistan Railways has the following 6 regional railway junctions (Russian: Региональный железнодорожный узел (РЖУ); Uzbek: Mintaqaviy temir yo'l uzeli (MTU)):

No.	Branch name in Russian	Branch name in Uzbek	Website	Managed from
1	Кунградский РЖУ	Qo‘ng‘irot MTU	kungrad.aitm.uz	Qońirat
2	Бухарский РЖУ	Buxoro MTU	buxoro-mtu.railwayinfra.uz	Bukhara
3	Ташкентский РЖУ	Toshkent MTU	toshkentmtu.uz	Tashkent
4	Кокандский РЖУ	Qo‘qon MTU	kokand.aitm.uz	Kokand
5	Каршинский РЖУ	Qarshi MTU	qarshimtu.uz	Qarshi
6	Термезский РЖУ	Termiz MTU	N/A	Termez

=== High-speed lines ===
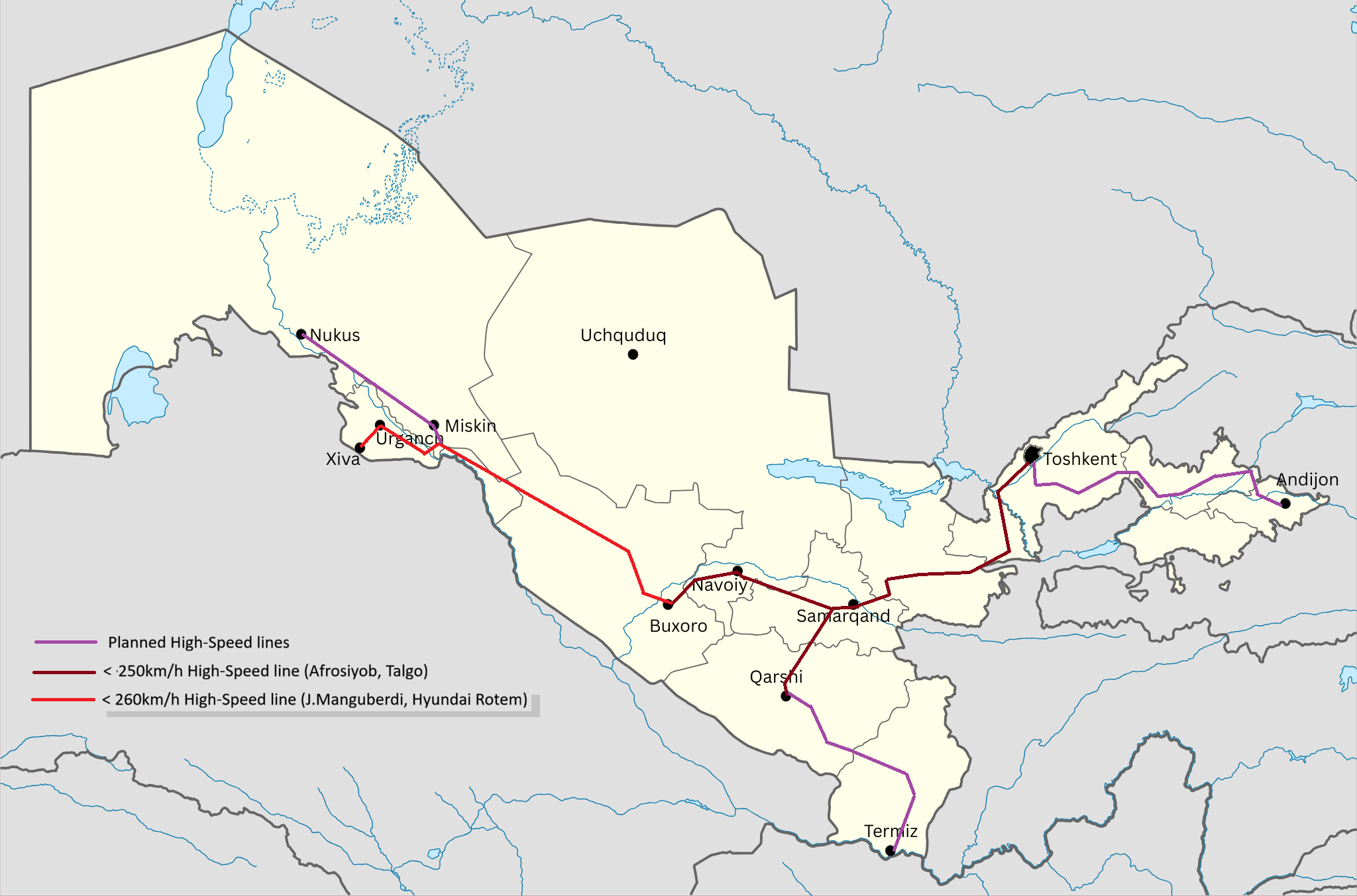
Uzbekistan HSR-network 2026

The Tashkent–Bukhara high-speed rail line started operation in September 2011 after being upgraded. The line reached Khiva in 2026, and is planned to be extended till Nukus by 2027.

Line	Termini	Length	Type	Maximum speed	Opening	Status
Tashkent–Bukhara	Tashkent–Bukhara	600 km (370 mi)	New	250 km/h (160 mph)	2011	Operational
Bhukhara–Khiva	Bukhara-Khiva	465 km (289 mi)	New	260 km/h (160 mph)	2026	Operational
Miskin–Nukus	Miskin–Nukus	196 km (122 mi)	New	260 km/h (160 mph)	2027	Under Construction

=== Railway links with adjacent countries ===
- Afghanistan – yes, linked, same gauge 1,520 mm (4 ft 11 27/32 in).
- Kazakhstan – yes, linked with Kazakhstan Temir Joly, same gauge 1,520 mm (4 ft 11 27/32 in).
- Kyrgyzstan – yes, linked with Kyrgyz Railways, same gauge 1,520 mm (4 ft 11 27/32 in).
- Tajikistan – yes, linked with Tajik Railways, same gauge 1,520 mm (4 ft 11 27/32 in).
- Turkmenistan – yes, linked with Demirýollary, same gauge 1,520 mm (4 ft 11 27/32 in).

Uzbek Railways has direct passenger train links to Moscow, Ufa, Chelyabinsk, Novosibirsk, Saratov, Penza and Saint Petersburg (via Kazakhstan). From Almaty connecting trains are provided to Urumchi in China. Also Tajik trains of Dushanbe-Moscow (No: 319), Moscow-Dushanbe (No: 320), Khujand-Saratov (No: 335), Khujand-Atyrau (No: 335), Saratov-Khujand (No: 336), Khujand-Moscow (No: 359), Moscow-Khujand (No: 360), Kanibadam-Bokhtar (No: 389), Bokhtar-Kanibadam (No: 389) and Atyrau-Khujand (No: 692) passes through Uzbekistan.

The Karshi-Termez line, which extends across the border into Afghanistan, is being electrified. In March 2018, Uzbek Railways began a new service, connecting Tashkent with Balykchy. The China–Kyrgyzstan–Uzbekistan railway, which started construction in 2025, aims to build 523 km of new track (50 km of which is in Uzbekistan) connecting Kashgar, China via Kyrgyzstan to Andijan.

== Rolling stock ==
=== Passenger trains ===
Class	Type	Number	Year	Manufacturer	Notes
ER9E	EMU		1962	RVR	refurbished
ER2	EMU		1962	RVR	refurbished
Talgo 250 (Afrosiyob)	EMU	6	2011–2021	Talgo	
UTY EMU-250	EMU	6+8	2026	Hyundai Rotem	
RegioPanter	EMU	10	2028	Škoda	planned
	DMU				

=== Freight ===
- 3ES5K locomotives (~7, Novocherkassk Electric Locomotive Plant, 2018–2020)

== See also ==
- Transport in Uzbekistan
