= Ymamnazar =

- Location in Turkmenistan
- Coordinates: 37°14′56″N 65°15′47″E
- Country: Turkmenistan
- Province: Lebap Province
- District: Kerki District
- Time zone: UTC+5 (TMT)

Ymamnazar (also Ymam Nazar, Imamnazar) is a former settlement in Lebap province, Turkmenistan. It is situated immediately adjacent to Turkmenistan's southern border with Afghanistan, opposite to Aqina. The nearest city in Turkmenistan is Kerki.

In 2007, an international border crossing point was opened in Ymamnazar, making it one of two international border crossings on the Turkmenistan-Afghanistan border, the other being Serhetabat-Torghundi. The border crossing is officially called "Saparmyrat", after Saparmyrat "Türkmenbaşy" Nyýazow, the first president of Turkmenistan.

There are basic transshipment facilities here, including a small oil terminal for shipping Turkmen hydrocarbons onward into Afghanistan.

== Railhead ==
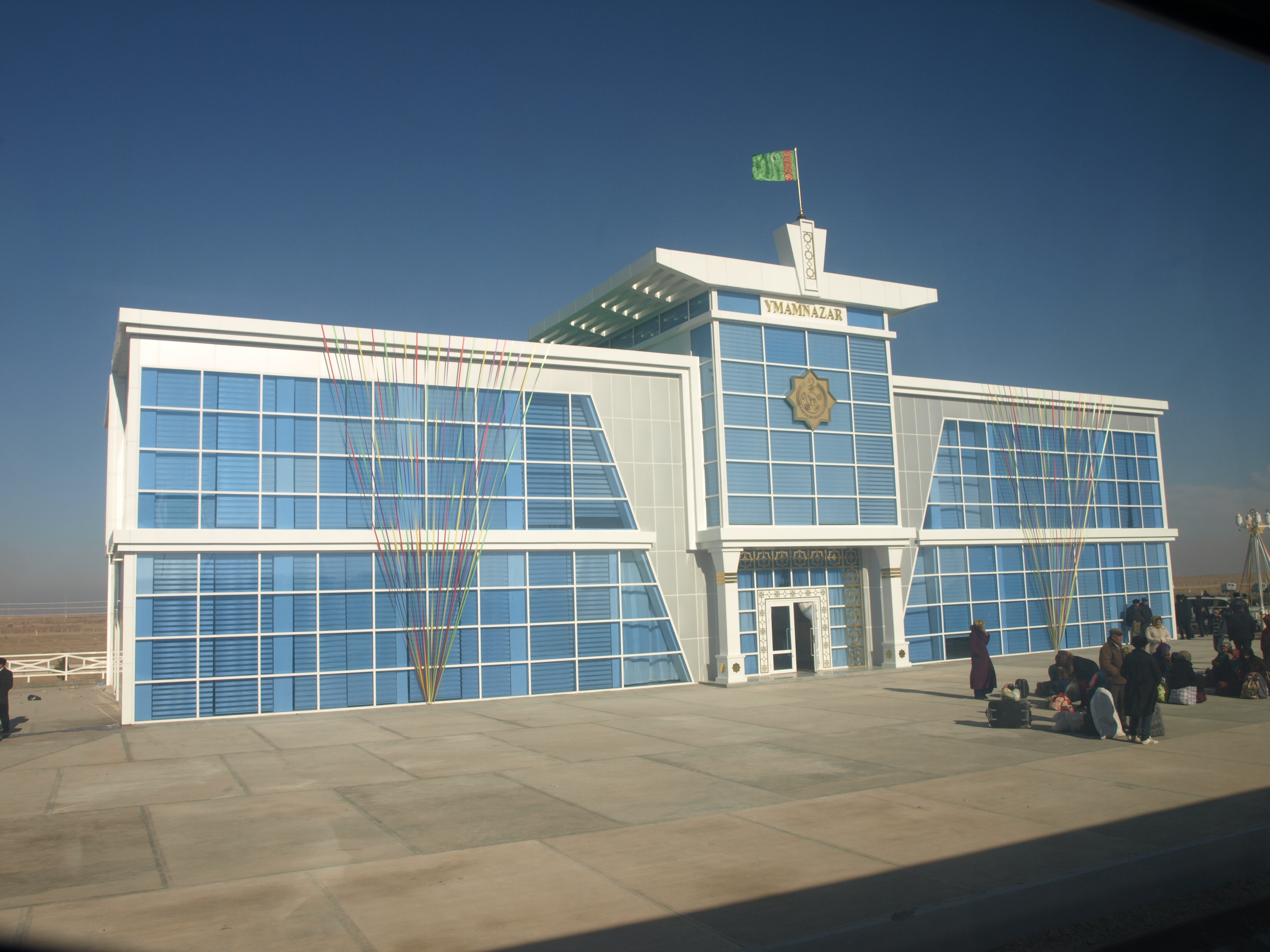
The passenger rail station at Ymamnazar, Turkmenistan, on the border with Afghanistan.

In 2015, Ymamnazar became the southern terminus of a railway line from Kerki. In 2016 the line was extended across the border into Afghanistan to Aqina and opened for traffic in November 2016. It is one of only three railways in Afghanistan. The line is eventually planned to form part of railway corridor through northern Afghanistan, linking Turkmenistan with Tajikistan via Sheberghan, Mazar-i-Sharif and Sher Khan Bandar.

== Petroleum Depot ==
As of November 2016 Ymamnazar featured a petroleum depot with 45,000 m^{3} capacity. The depot is designed for delivery of fuel to Afghanistan, and includes 12 storage tanks for motor fuels and liquid petroleum gas, including seven tanks of 5,000 m^{3} each and five tanks of 2,000 m^{3} each. Design capacity of the depot is 540,000 tonnes per year. Fuel is delivered to the petroleum depot by rail and by a pipeline from the Seýdi oil refinery.

== See also ==
- Kerki
- Rail transport in Turkmenistan
- Serhetabat
