= Chabahar–Zahedan railway =

Railway line under construction in Iran

Overview
- Status: Completed
- Locale: Iran
- Termini: Port of Chabahar; Zahedan

History
- Planned opening: Late 2026

Technical
- Line length: 750 km (470 mi)
- Operating speed: 120 km/h (75 mph)

The Chabahar–Zahedan railway is a railway line in Iran. Construction was completed on September 25th, 2026 and it is expected to be open and operational by late 2026.

== Location ==
The rail line is to connect the port of Chahbahar, which is located on the Indian Ocean, to the country's rail network via Zahedan - from 2021 according to the original plans. The railway is to pass through Khash, Iranshahr and Nikshahr. The port is the only deep-water port in Iran that has direct access to the Indian Ocean without ships having to pass through the narrow Strait of Hormuz. The railroad therefore also has strategic military significance for Iran. For India, this route represents a chance for freight traffic to obtain a water/land connection to Russia, bypassing Pakistan. India was therefore reported to contribute to the construction of the railroad line financially. There were confusion about Indian involvement in the project later in 2020.

== History ==
The first tracks were laid in November 2020, in 2022 commissioning was scheduled for 2024. On 10 November 2022, the Zahedan- Khash railway was officially inaugurated. On 25 October 2025, Iranian officials stated that the project was 84% complete and was expected to be finished by Nowruz (20 March 2026). In late January 2026 iranian officials reported that the substructure work was 96% completed and track laying was 75% completed with station buildings almost complete and key stations like Iranshahr ready for operation. The railway was expected to be completed by the end 2026 and be operational in June of 2027. On 16 August 2026 the Iranian transport minister Farzaneh Sadegh stated that track laying along the railway was complete and the railway will be operational within three months.

== Technical details ==
The line will be 750 kilometers long and built on a single track with the standard gauge common in Iran. The maximum gradient will be 15 ‰ with a maximum curve radius of 1000 meters. The line is designed for a maximum permissible speed of 120 km/h for passenger trains and 90 km/h for freight trains. It is planned to transport 1.3 million tons of goods in the first year of operation, which is planned to be increased to 35 million tons within the next 20 years.

== Expansion plans ==
At a later date, the route is to be extended from Zahedan around 800 kilometers north via Mashhad to Seraqs on the border with Turkmenistan. This will create a north–south connection along Iran's eastern border, giving the landlocked Central Asian states the shortest access to a seaport. A branch to Afghanistan is planned near Zaranj to facilitate trade in goods. The route is part of the INSTC.

== See also ==
- International North–South Transport Corridor
