= Torghundi =

Town in Herat Province, Afghanistan

Torghundi تورغونډۍ
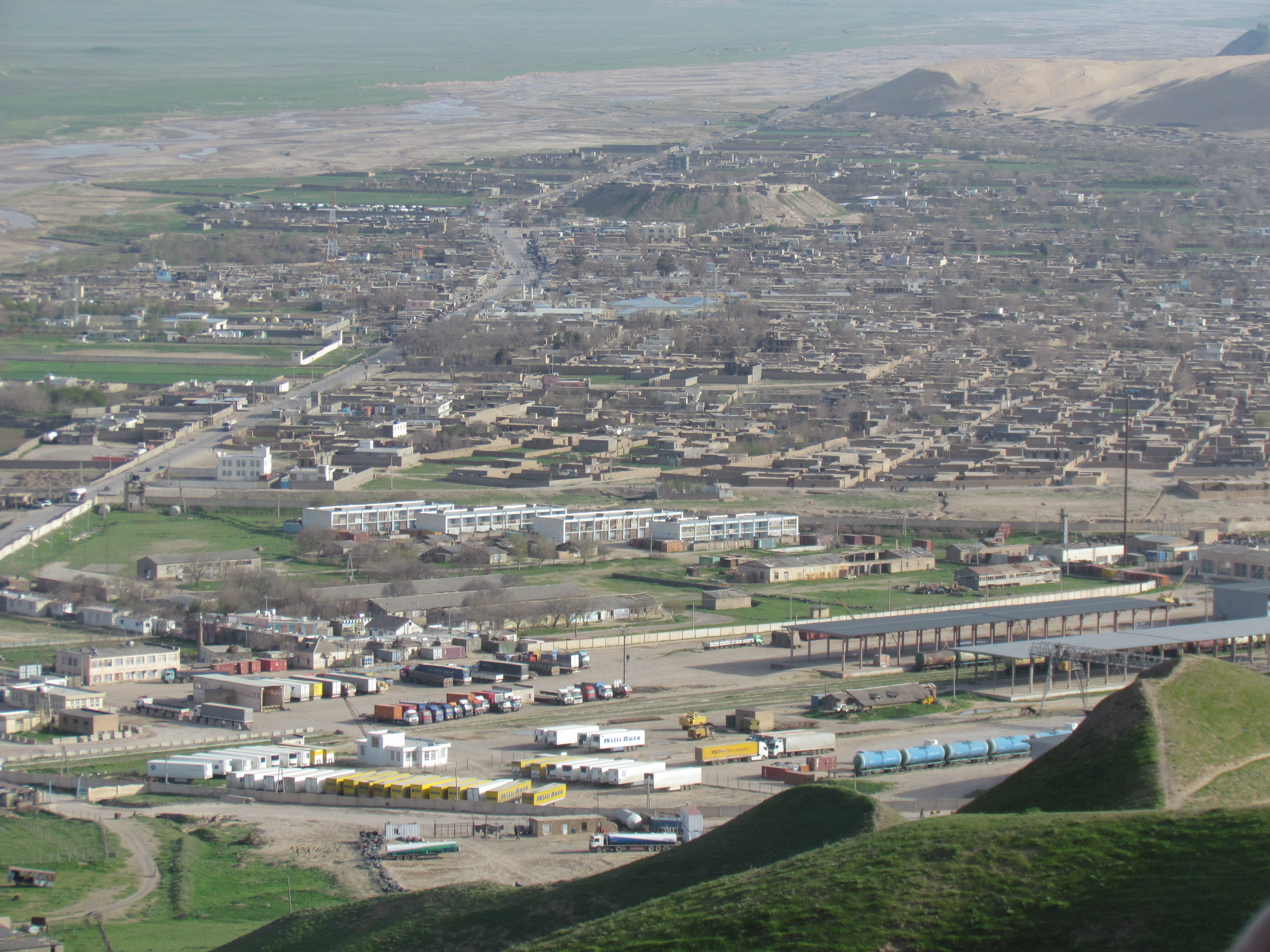
- View of Torghundi in 2013

- Location in Afghanistan
- Coordinates: 35°15′N 62°17′E
- Country: Afghanistan
- Province: Herat Province
- District: Kushk District
- Elevation: 2,224 ft (678 m)
- Time zone: UTC+4:30 (AFT)

Torghundi (Pashto: تورغونډۍ, romanized: Torghūnḍəi, pronounced [ˌt̪oɾɣuɳˈɖəɪ]) or Turgundy (Turkmen pronunciation: [ˌtʊɾɢuːnˈdɯ]) is a border town in northern Herat Province of Afghanistan. The town's main attraction is the Torghundi custom house and border checkpoint, which officially connects Afghanistan by road with Turkmenistan. Torghundi is the second checkpoint and border crossing between the two countries, with Aqina to the northeast being the other. Torghundi is connected by both a regular road and a 1520 mm gauge railroad with the neighboring town of Serhetabat in Turkmenistan. The city of Herat in Afghanistan is located about 100 km (62 mi) of driving distance south from Torghundi.

The railroad at Torghundi was originally established in the early 1960s as a single track, and was upgraded in 2017. Torghundi has become the starting point of the Lapis Lazuli trade corridor.

Situated at 678 m (2,224 ft) above sea level in the Kushk District of Herat Province, Torghundi serves as one of the major transporting, shipping and receiving locations in Afghanistan. It also serves as one of the official border crossings between the people of Afghanistan and Turkmenistan. Security in and around the town is provided by the Afghan National Security Forces, which include the Afghan Border Force. The town fell to Taliban forces in July 2021, as part of the wider 2021 Taliban offensive. Every visitor or traveler between Afghanistan and Turkmenistan is required to possess a valid travel visa.

== Name ==
The name Torghundi means Dark Hill or Black Hill in Pashto language.

== Climate ==
With an influence from the local steppe climate, Torghundi features a cold semi-arid climate (BSk) under the Köppen climate classification. The average temperature in Toraghundi is 15.8 °C, while the annual precipitation averages 300 mm.

July is the hottest month of the year with an average temperature of 28.5 °C. The coldest month January has an average temperature of 3.4 °C.

Climate data for Torghundi
Month	Jan	Feb	Mar	Apr	May	Jun	Jul	Aug	Sep	Oct	Nov	Dec	Year
Mean daily maximum °C (°F)	9.0 (48.2)	10.4 (50.7)	16.4 (61.5)	22.5 (72.5)	29.4 (84.9)	34.6 (94.3)	36.7 (98.1)	35.1 (95.2)	30.8 (87.4)	24.8 (76.6)	17.3 (63.1)	11.6 (52.9)	23.2 (73.8)
Daily mean °C (°F)	3.4 (38.1)	4.8 (40.6)	10.0 (50.0)	15.5 (59.9)	21.2 (70.2)	26.0 (78.8)	28.5 (83.3)	26.8 (80.2)	21.7 (71.1)	16.0 (60.8)	9.7 (49.5)	5.5 (41.9)	15.8 (60.4)
Mean daily minimum °C (°F)	−2.2 (28.0)	−0.7 (30.7)	3.7 (38.7)	8.6 (47.5)	13.0 (55.4)	17.4 (63.3)	20.4 (68.7)	18.5 (65.3)	12.7 (54.9)	7.3 (45.1)	2.2 (36.0)	−0.5 (31.1)	8.4 (47.1)
Source: Climate-Data.org

== See also ==
- Afghanistan–Turkmenistan border
- Afghanistan–Turkmenistan relations
- Land border crossings of Afghanistan
- Turkmenistan–Afghanistan–Pakistan–India Pipeline (TAPI)
