= Dishu District =

Dishu دېشو ولسوالۍ
- District
- Location within Afghanistan
- Coordinates: 30°26′11″N 63°20′09″E
- Country: Afghanistan
- Province: Helmand Province

Population (2012)
  - Total: 19,900

Dishu (Pashto: دیشو ولسوالۍ) is a district in the south of Helmand Province, Afghanistan, bordering Pakistan. Its population, which is 80% Pashtun and 20% Baloch, was estimated at 19,900 in 2012. The district centre is the village of Dishu; most of the settlements in the district are along the Helmand River. The other important town is Bahramcha.
