= Khani Chahar Bagh District =

Khan Char Bagh خان چارباغ
- District
- Location within Afghanistan
- Coordinates: 37°07′N 65°14′E
- Country: Afghanistan
- Province: Faryab

Area
  - Total: 1,056 km^{2} (408 sq mi)
- Elevation: 278 m (912 ft)

Population (2013)
  - Total: 70,000

Khan Chahar Bagh or Khan Char Bagh (Uzbek: خان چارباغ) is the most northerly district in Faryab province. The main village, Chahar Bagh 37.0444°N 65.2308°E, is in the southern part of the district. In the north the district's border is with Turkmenistan. The population in 2013 was estimated at 70,000. Ethnic composition includes 25% Turkmen and 75% Uzbek.
