= Trans-Afghan Railway Project =

Railway line in Central Asia

Pakistan-Afghanistan-Uzbekistan railway

Overview
- Status: Under study
- Owner: Uzbekistan, Afghanistan, Pakistan
- Locale: Uzbekistan, Afghanistan, Pakistan
- Termini: Tashkent, Uzbekistan; Kharlachi, Kurram, Pakistan

Service
- Type: Passenger and freight

Technical
- Line length: 573 km (356 mi)

The Uzbekistan–Afghanistan–Pakistan (UAP) Railway Project is an extensive project undertaking with the objective of creating a direct railway link between Uzbekistan and Pakistan, passing through Afghanistan's territory. This project aims to enhance trade and logistics efficiency by establishing a 573 km (356 mi) rail connection that would connect Tashkent, the capital of Uzbekistan, to Kabul and Peshawar, the capital of Afghanistan and the provincial capital of Pakistan, respectively.

== Project Details ==
The estimated cost of the UAP project is US$4.8 billion, and its implementation is anticipated to strengthen trade relations between Pakistan and Central Asia. The trilateral agreement spanning 760 km (470 mi) was signed by Pakistan, Afghanistan, and Uzbekistan, aiming to significantly reduce cargo delivery times between Uzbekistan and Pakistan by approximately five days.

The railway route will traverse through Termez, Mazar-i-Sharif, and Logar in Afghanistan, and continue to the Kharlachi border crossing in Pakistan's northwestern Kurram district. Designed to facilitate both passenger and freight services, the railway is poised to foster regional trade and contribute to overall economic growth in the area.

On 17 July 2025, a joint feasibility study was agreed upon by the three countries.

In January 2026, the Kazakh government via its ambassador in Pakistan offered to fully finance the construction of a railway connecting Kazakhstan to Pakistani ports via Afghanistan.

On 4 February 2026, the Uzbek president Shavkat Mirziyoyev formally decreed to launch procedures to begin a joint feasibility study on the railway project with Afghan and Pakistani governments.

== Gauge ==
Three different gauges are involved:

- Iran in the West (1435mm)
- Afghanistan in the center (1435mm Iranian built railways, 1520mm Turkmen and Uzbek built railways)
- Uzbekistan, Tajikistan and Kyrgyzstan in the North (1520mm) with dual gauge (1435mm) to bypass two breaks of gauge.
- Pakistan in the South (1676mm)
- China in the East (1435mm)
