= Afghanistan–Turkmenistan relations =

Afghanistan–Turkmenistan
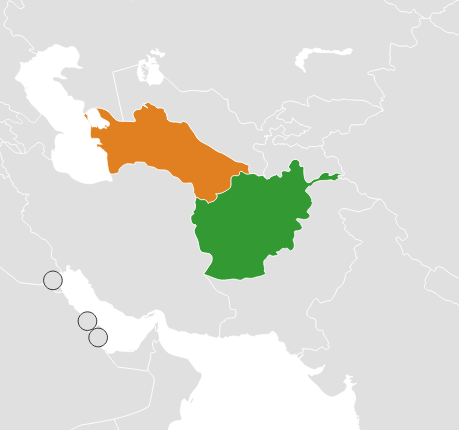

- Afghanistan: Turkmenistan

Diplomatic mission
- Afghan Embassy, Ashgabat: Turkmen Embassy, Kabul

Envoy
- Chargé d'Affaires Fazal Muhammad Sabir: Ambassador Hoja Ovezov

The contemporary borders of the nations of Afghanistan and Turkmenistan are the products of The Great Game in Central Asia between the British and Russian Empires. As a result, the two countries have some cultural ties, with Afghanistan having 1.2 million Turkmen, the third largest Turkmen population behind Iran and Turkmenistan.

Afghanistan depends on Turkmenistan for meeting a large part of the country's electricity needs, as the country imports more than 800 megawatts of electricity collectively from Turkmenistan, Iran, Uzbekistan, and Tajikistan.

Before the full takeover of Afghanistan by the Taliban in mid-August 2021, Turkmenistan opened a major railway link to the country in 2016 to facilitate fuel exports.

Turkmenistan, alongside most of the countries excluding Russia, has not officially recognized the Taliban government, the Islamic Emirate of Afghanistan, as legitimate. However, Turkmenistan has de facto diplomatic relations with the Taliban government and has facilitated the Taliban's appointment of diplomats to the Afghan Embassy in Ashgabat. The current chargé d'affaires is Fazal Muhammad Sabir, appointed in March 2022.

== History ==
The protocol on the establishment of diplomatic relations between Turkmenistan and the Islamic Republic of Afghanistan was signed on 21 February 1992. The territories of the two countries were under unified control during the periods of the Samanid, Ghaznavid, and Timurid dynasties. In 1750, a Treaty of Friendship was signed between the Afghan ruler Ahmad Shah Durrani and the Bukharan ruler Muhammad Murad Beg, with the Amu Darya River becoming the official boundary of Afghanistan. On 11 July 2007, a two-kilometer cross-border road between the two countries was restored. The restoration cost amounted to 550,000 US dollars. President of Turkmenistan Gurbanguly Berdimuhamedov stated that his country would assist Afghanistan in rebuilding its economy, which had suffered from many years of civil war.

Since 2022, the new government of Afghanistan (the Taliban) has been implementing a large-scale project to construct the Qosh Tepa Canal, diverting water from the Amu Darya River. This canal could significantly reduce the amount of fresh water available to Turkmenistan.

== Diplomatic missions ==
The Embassy of Turkmenistan in the Islamic Republic of Afghanistan is located in Kabul, with consulates operating in Herat and Mazar-i-Sharif.

In Ashgabat, the Embassy of the Islamic Republic of Afghanistan functions, headed by Extraordinary and Plenipotentiary Ambassador Fazal Muhammad Sabir.

== See also ==
- Torghundi, a border crossing between Afghanistan and Turkmenistan
- Turkmenistan–Afghanistan–Pakistan–India Pipeline (TAPI)
