= Afghan Border Force =

Border Guard of Afghanistan

- Active: December 2017 – August 2021
- Country: Islamic Republic of Afghanistan
- Branch: Afghan National Army
- Type: Border guard
- Role: Counterinsurgency
- Engagements: War in Afghanistan

Insignia
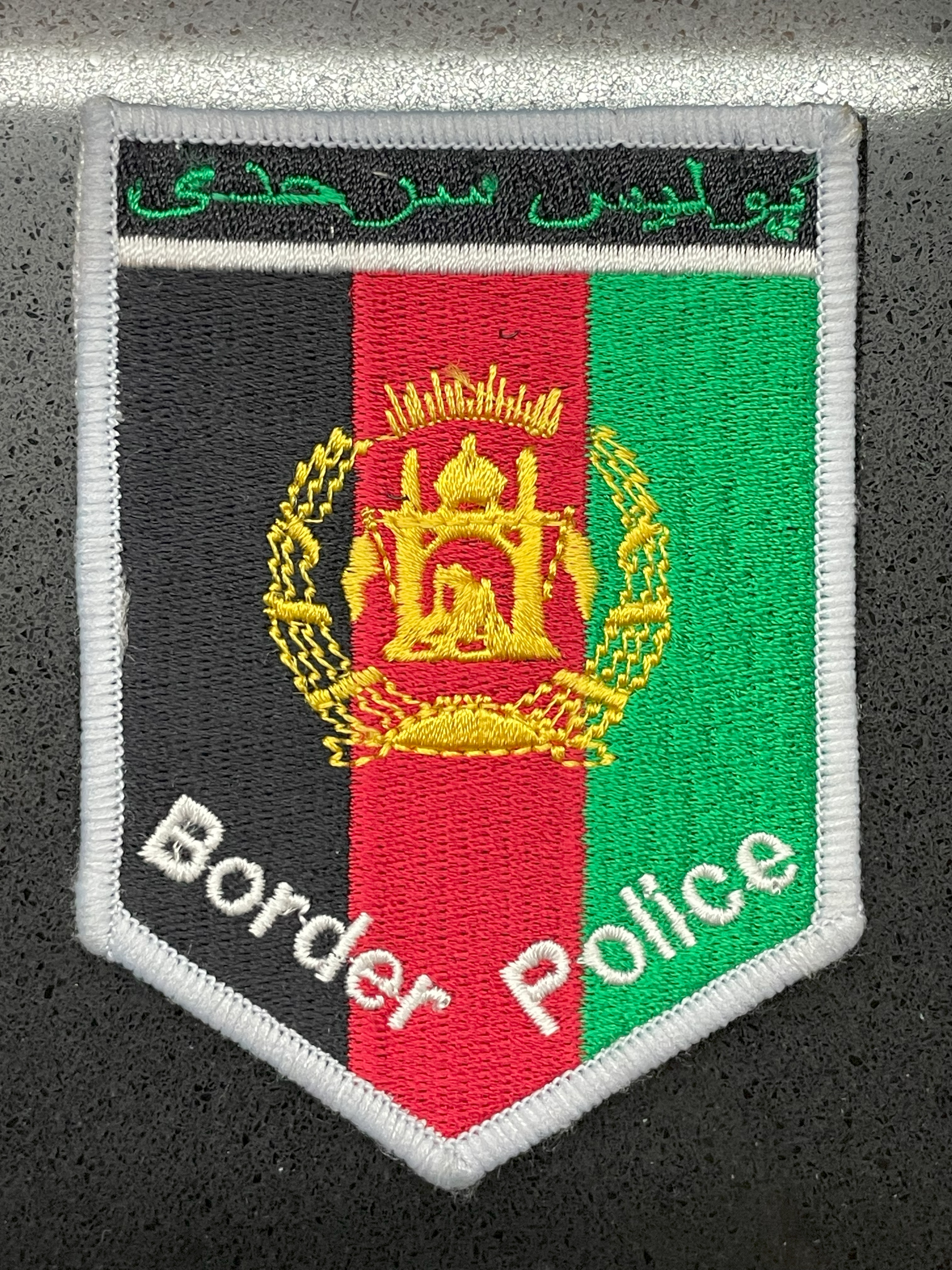
- ABP patch

The Afghan Border Force (abbreviated ABF) was a paramilitary police responsible for counterinsurgency and security of Afghanistan's border area with neighboring countries extending up to 30 miles (48 km) into the interior and formed part of the Afghan National Army.

The ABF, and its predecessor the ABP, anti-narcotic efforts were a prominent concern to the international community during the War in Afghanistan. The ABF, and the ABP in its former role, patrolled a 50 km-wide corridor along the entirety of Afghanistan's 5,529 kilometres (3,436 mi) border, particularly the long and porous Durand Line border in the southeast with neighboring Pakistan.

== History ==
In December 2017, most of the Afghan Border Police (ABP) personnel of the Afghan National Police were transferred to the Afghan National Army to form the Afghan Border Force. The ABP retained 4,000 personnel for customs operations at border crossings and international airports such as checking documents of foreigners entering the country or deporting them.

The Afghan Border Forces was apparently been dissolved after the collapse of the Islamic Republic of Afghanistan in August 2021.

== Organization ==
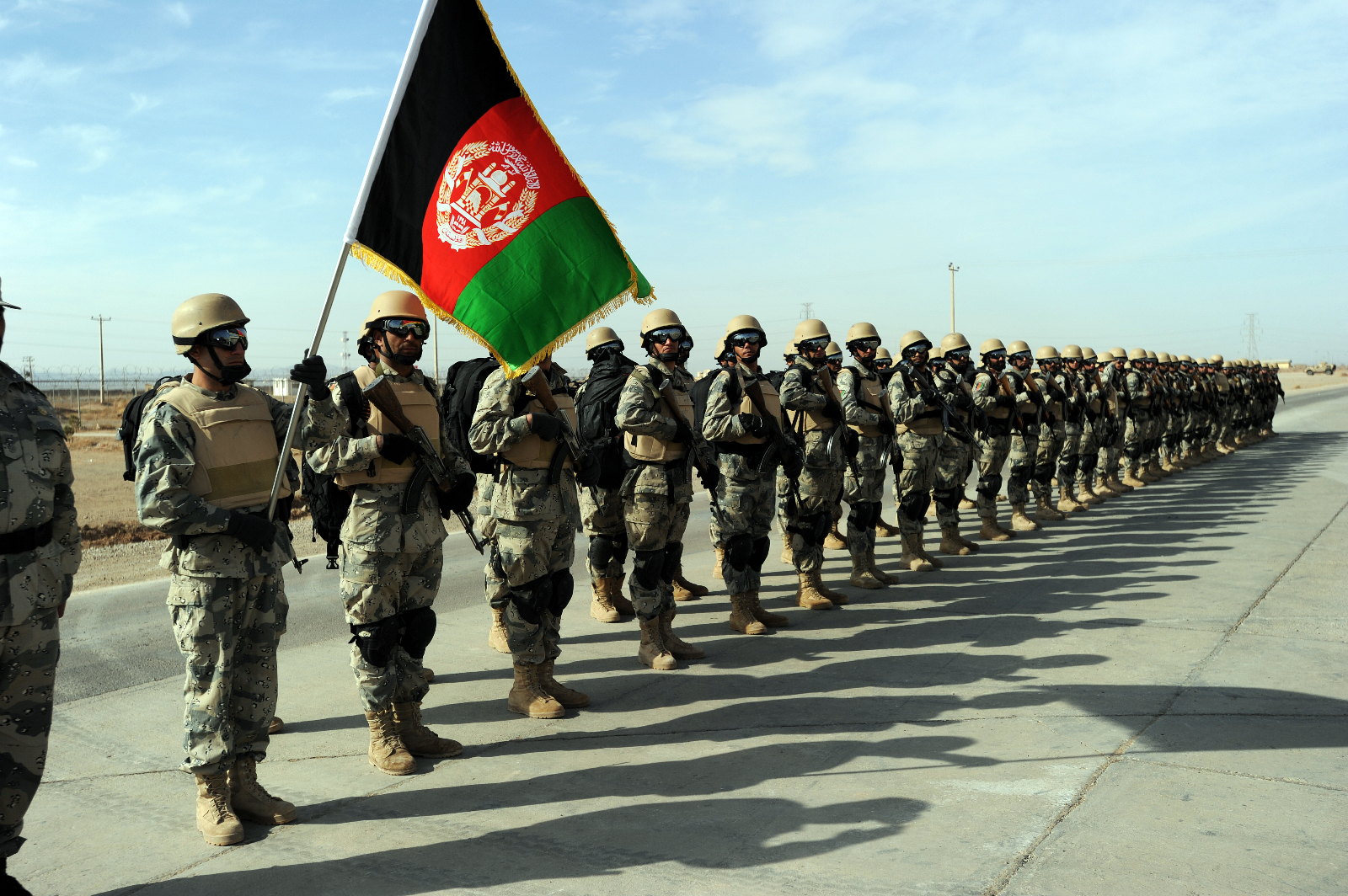
Afghan Border Police (ABP) Regional Command – West in Herat Province of Afghanistan.

The ABP fell under the command of the Afghan National Police (ANP) which was under the administrative control of the Ministry of Interior Affairs. The ABP was headquartered in Kabul, in the nation's capital, and was commanded by a Lieutenant General. Prior to 2017, the Afghan Border Police divided command of its 23,000 members across 6 zones to protect 14 Border Crossing Points and 5 Major Airports.

=== Mazar-e-Sharif (Northern Zone) ===
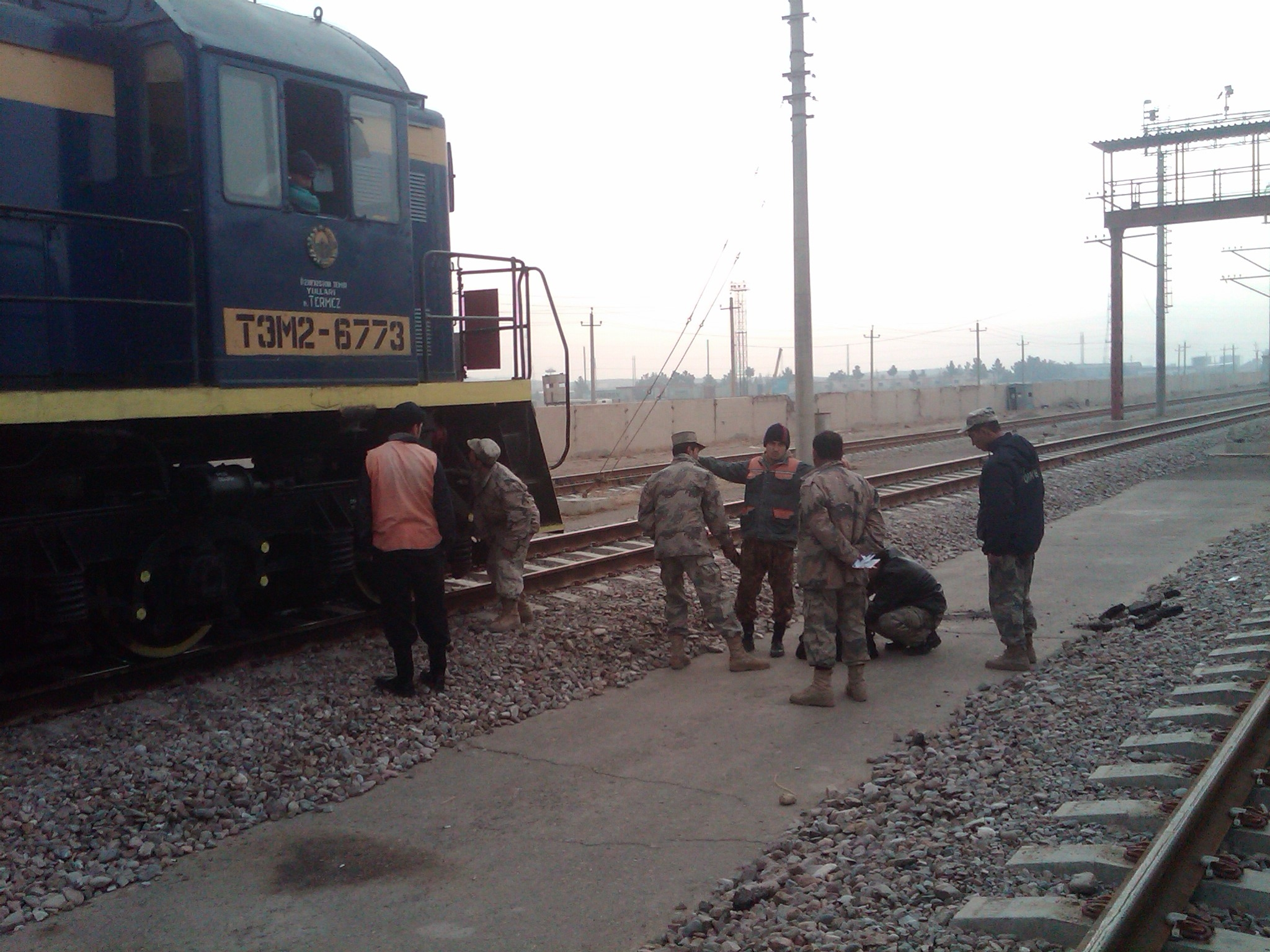
Members of the ABP search a locomotive near the Hairatan border crossing point.

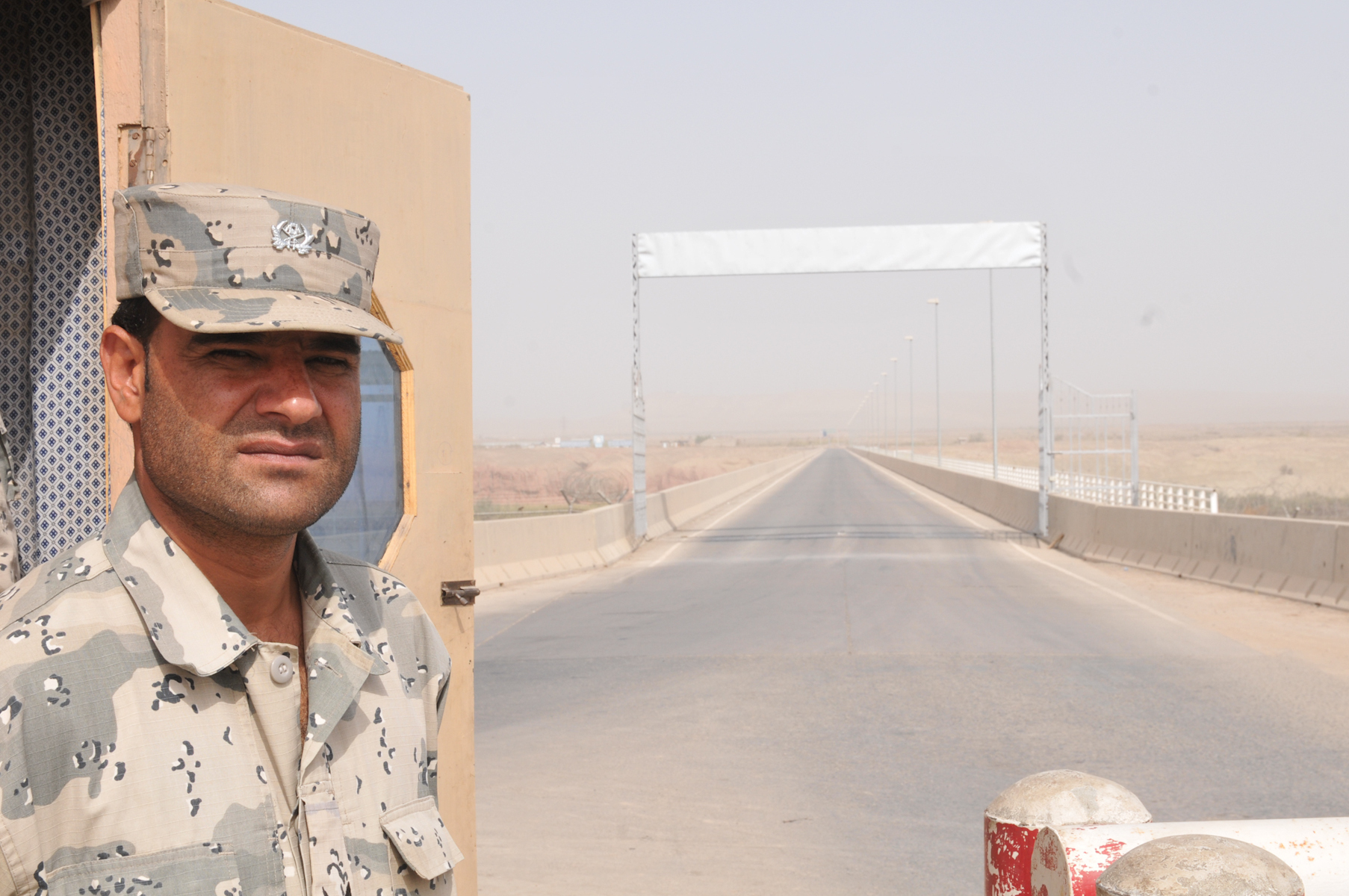
Afghan border agent near the Afghanistan-Tajikistan Bridge at Sher Khan Bandar in Kunduz Province

- Faryab Province
  - Almar District
  - Shirin Tagab District
  - Dawlat Abad District
  - Qaramqol District
  - Andkhoy District
  - Khani Chahar Bagh District
- Jowzjan Province
  - Khwaja du koh District
  - Khamyab District
  - Qarqin District
- Balkh Province
  - Shortepa District
  - Kaldar District
- Kunduz Province
  - Qalay-I-Zal District
  - Imam Sahib District

=== Fayzabad (Northeastern Zone) ===
- Takhar Province
  - Khwaja Ghar District
  - Yangi Qala District
  - Sarqad District
  - Chah Ab District
- Badakhshan Province
  - Shahri Buzurg District
  - Yawan District
  - Ragh District
  - Kuf Ab District
  - Shekay District
  - Darwaz district
  - Darvaz-e Bala District
  - Shighnan District
  - Ishkashim District
  - Wakhan District
  - Zebak District
  - Kuran wa Munjan District

=== Jalalabad (Eastern Zone) ===
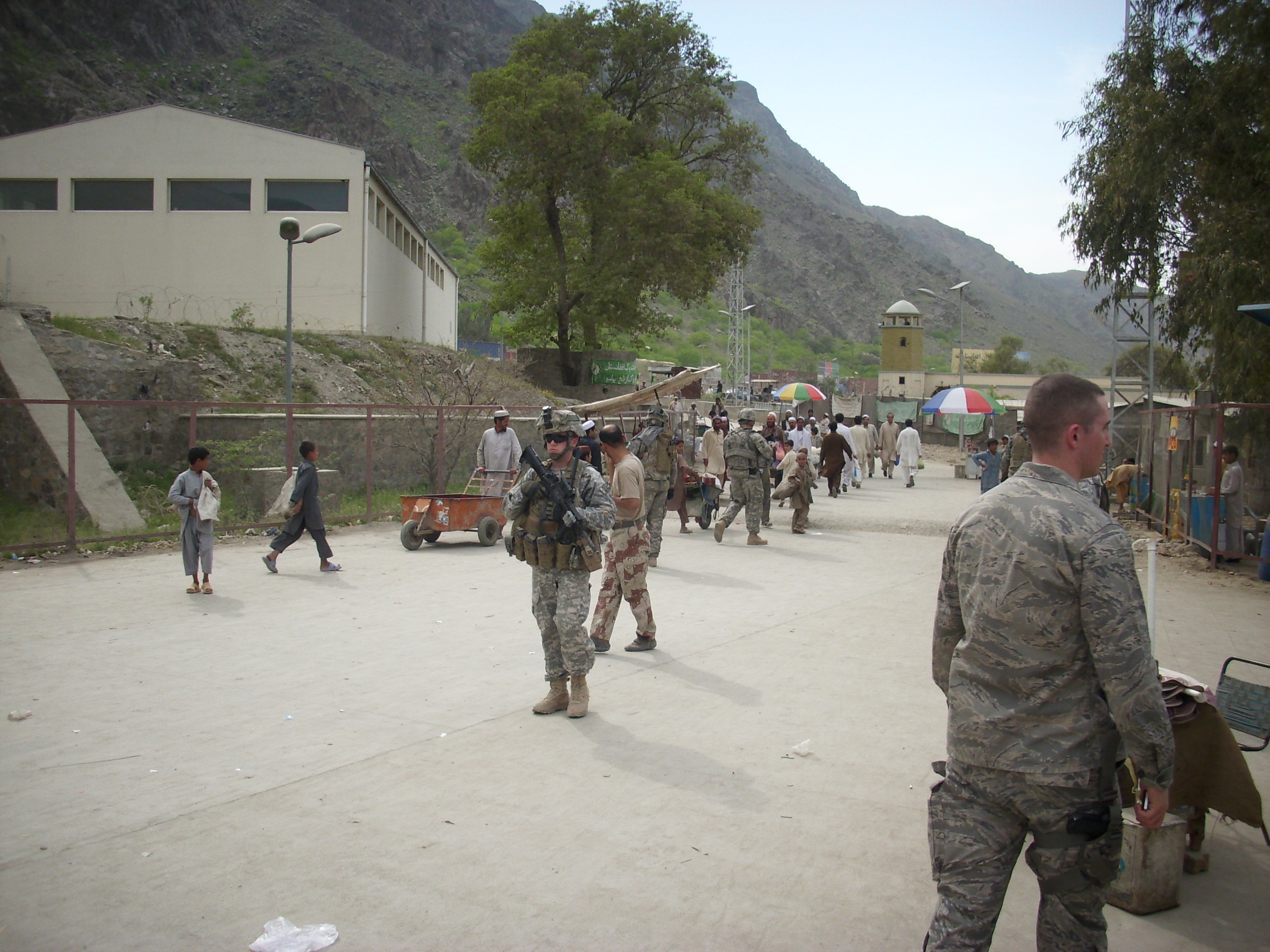
Torkham in Nangarhar Province, the main border crossing between Afghanistan and Pakistan.

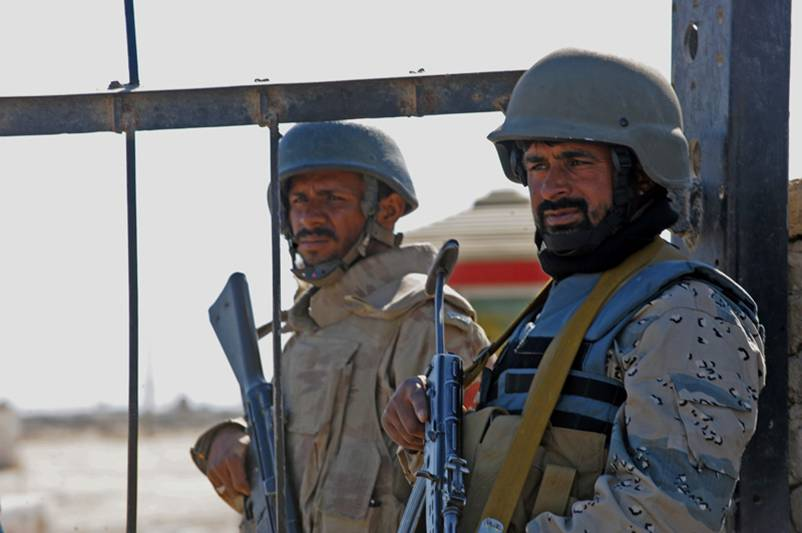
Frontier Corps Balochistan soldier (left) and the Afghan Border Police soldier (right) guards at the Friendship Gate Chaman, a border gate at Afghanistan-Pakistan border which is seven km southeast of Spin Boldak, Afghanistan.

- Nuristan Province
  - Bargi Matal District
  - Kamdesh District
- Kunar Province
  - Nari District
  - Dangam District
  - Marawara District
  - Sirkanay District
  - Khas Kunar District
- Nangarhar Province
  - Goshta District
  - Lal Pur District
  - Momand Dara District
  - Dur Baba District
  - Achin District
  - Dih Bala District
  - Pachir Wa Agam District
  - Khogyani District
  - Sherzad District

=== Gardez (Southeastern Zone) ===
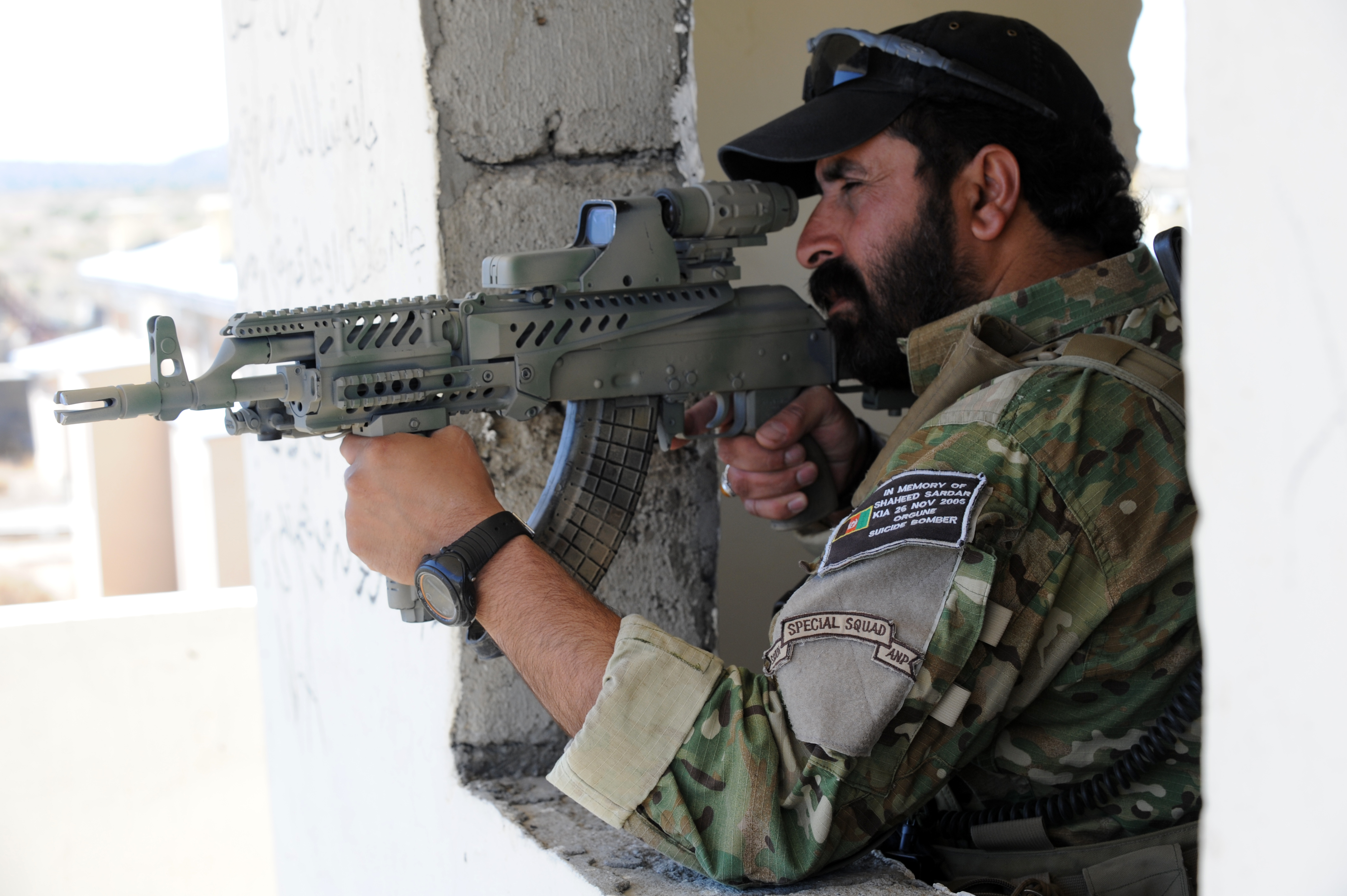
ABP officer aiming a modified AMD-65 at the border post in Paktika Province

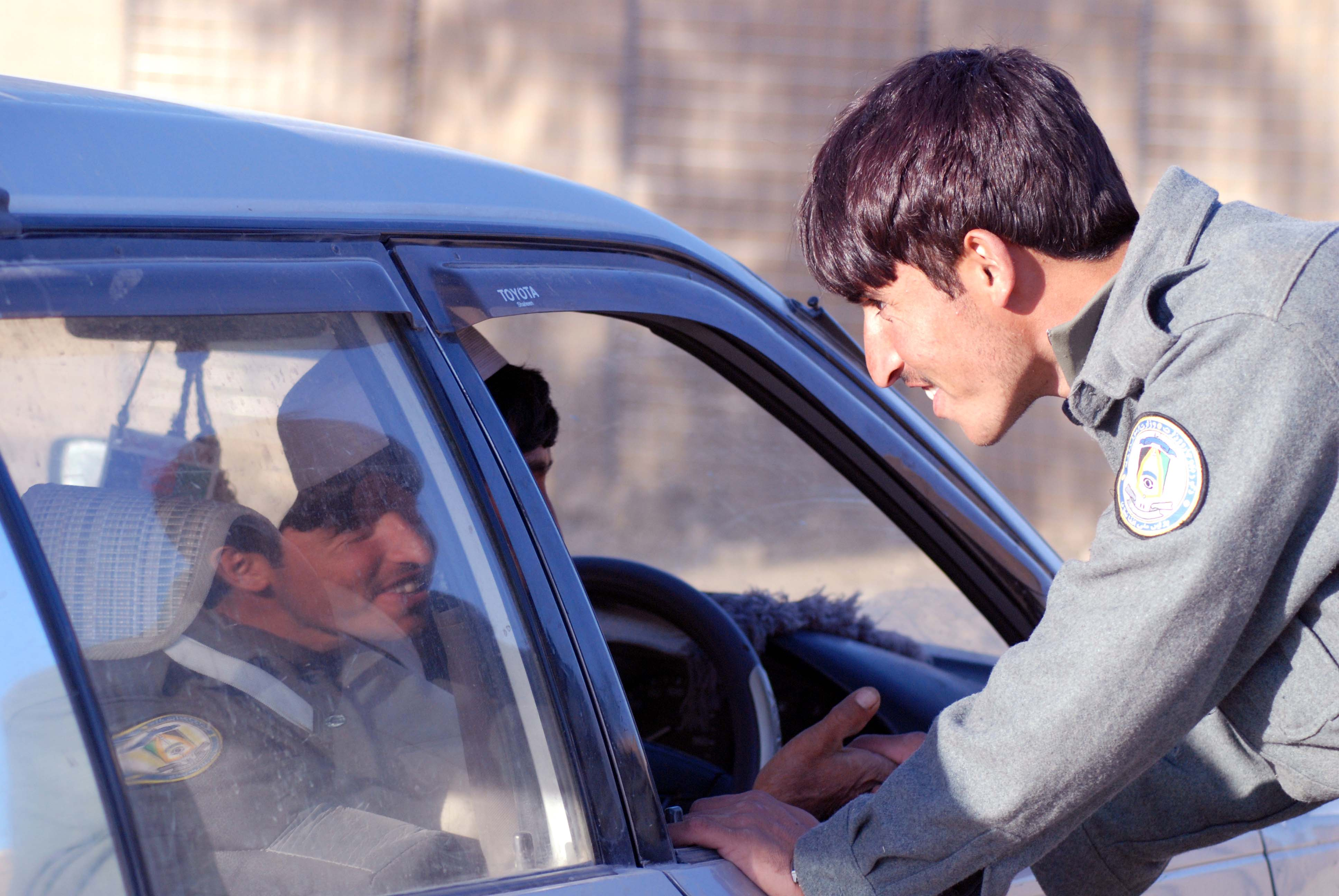
An Afghan Border Police agent at Khost border crossing in 2007

- Paktia Province
  - Azra District
  - Zazi District
  - Dand Wa Patan District
- Khost Province
  - Jaji Maydan District
  - Bak District
  - Tirazayi District
  - Khost District
  - Gurbuz District
  - Tani District
  - Spera District
- Paktika Province
  - Ziruk District
  - Urgon District
  - Gayan District
  - Barmal District
  - Gomal District
  - Wor Mamay District

=== Kandahar (Southern Zone) ===
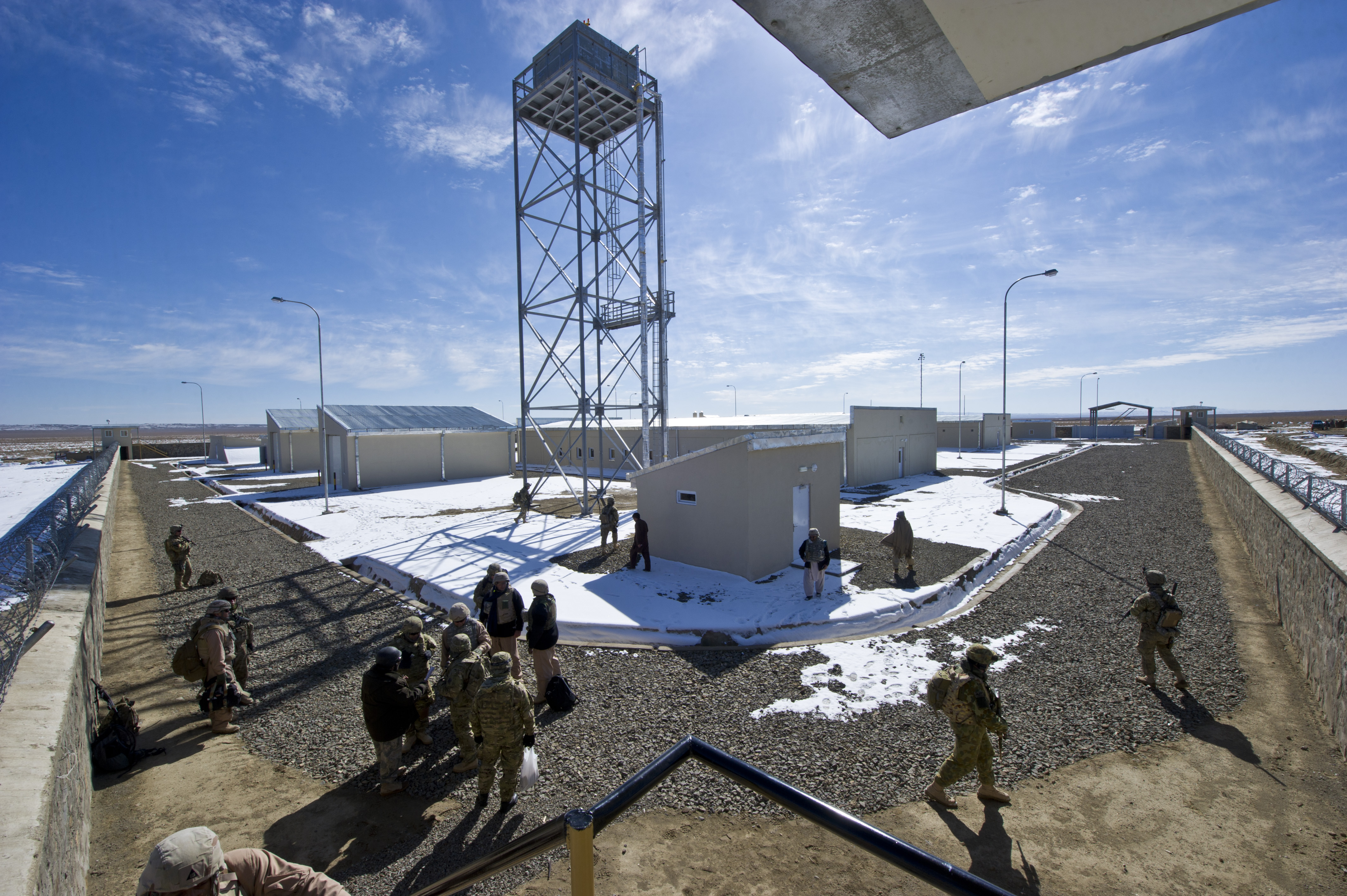
An ABP garrison in Kandahar Province during final inspection by United States Armed Forces.

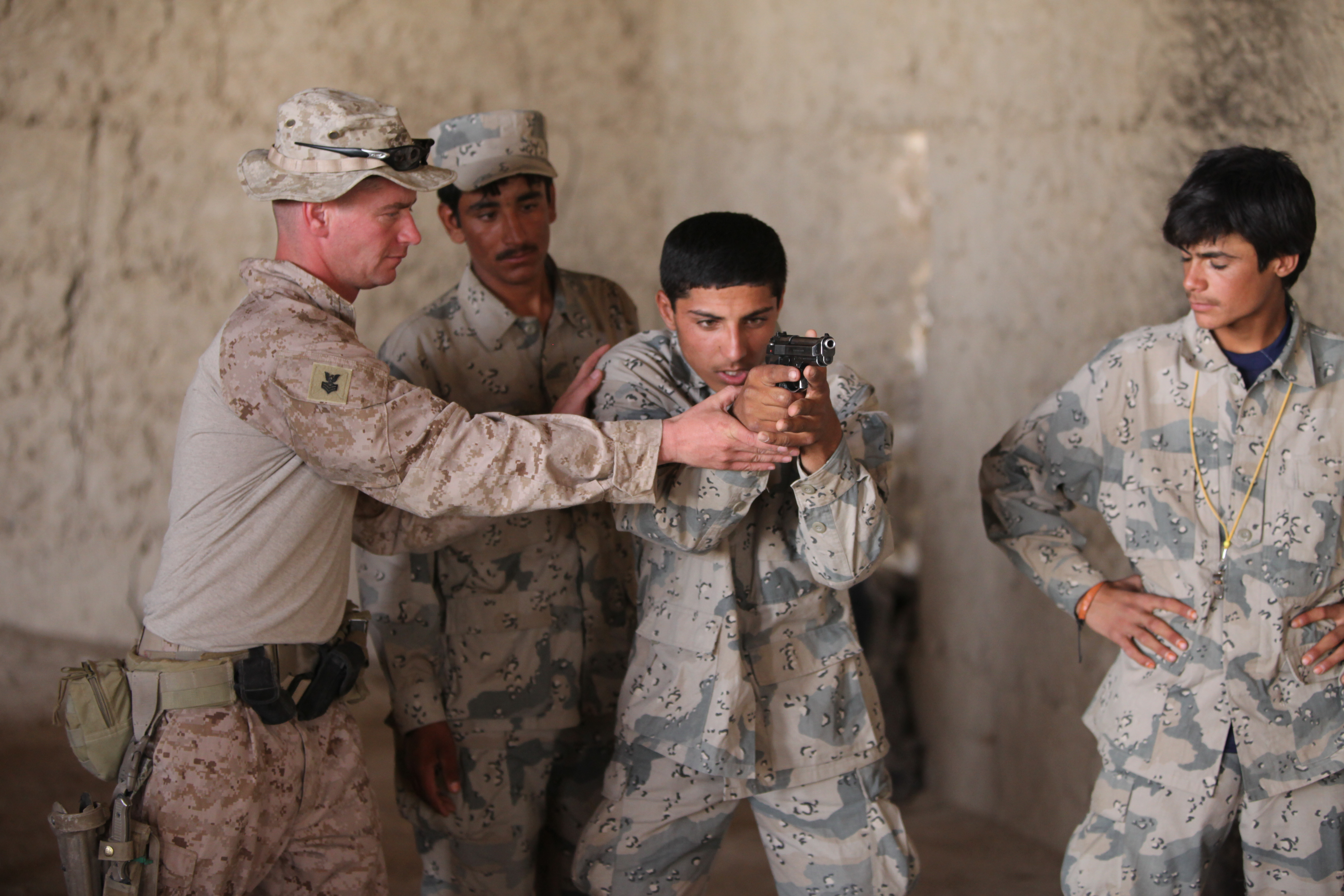
A Hospital Corpsman instructs Afghan soldiers on proper weapons handling at the border patrol compound in Shamshad, Afghanistan

- Zabul Province
  - Shamulzayi District
  - Atghar District
- Kandahar Province
  - Maruf District
  - Arghistan District
  - Spin Boldak District
  - Shorabak District
  - Reg District
- Helmand Province
  - Garmsir District
  - Dishu District
- Nimruz Province
  - Chahar Burjak District
  - Zaranj District
  - Kang District

=== Herat (Western Zone) ===
Gen. David H. Petraeus visiting Herat in 2010.

- Farah Province
  - Lash Wa Juwayn District
  - Shib Koh District
  - Qala i Kah District
  - Anar Dara District
- Herat Province
  - Adraskan District
  - Ghoryan District
  - Kohsan District
  - Gulran District
  - Kushk District
  - Kushki Kuhna District
- Badghis Province
  - Ab Kamari District
  - Muqur District
  - Murghab District
  - Ghormach District

== Training ==
The majority of the Afghan Border Police officers were trained by the United States Armed Forces and various Federal government employees as well as by the European Union Police Mission (EUPOL). In order to prepare for their duties as ABP, recruits attended an 8-week course designed by the German Bundespolizei (BPOL). Also Italy provided qualified training to ABP personnel in West Region by TF GRIFO deployed in Herat by the Guardia di Finanza. The BPOL were still heavily involved in mentoring ABP officers as of 2009.

In January 2011, there were at least 25 U.S. Immigration and Customs Enforcement and Customs and Border Protection officers providing training to the Afghan Border Police. Homeland Security Secretary Janet Napolitano stated that the number could reach 65 or more by the end of 2011. Napolitano visited the Torkham border crossing with Pakistan and was satisfied with the progress being made there.

The ABP was known to have jointly trained with the Tajik Border Troops, its equivalent in Tajikistan, which was overseen by the Organization for Security and Co-operation in Europe.
