= Kushk, Afghanistan =

Kushk
- Location in Afghanistan
- Coordinates: 33°17′44″N 61°57′08″E
- Country: Afghanistan
- Province: Herat Province
- District: Kushk District
- Elevation: 3,504 ft (1,068 m)

Population
  - Total: 17,479
- Time zone: UTC+4:30

Kushk or Koshk is a town in Afghanistan that shares its name with the Kushk River which flows by the town. It is the center of Kushk District, Herat Province. The population is 17,479. It is located at 33.29565°N 61.952206°E at 1,068 m altitude

== See also ==
- Herat Province
