= Al-Kashkari =

Hospital physician from Baghdad

Al-Kashkari (Arabic: الكسكري; 322 in AH/c. 934 CE in Kashkar – 414 AH/1023 CE in Fushanj) was a hospital physician from Baghdad.

In diagnosing mental disorder, al-Kashkari used criteria such the temperament of the patient as indicators to ascertain the nature of the mental disorder: sluggishness and forgetfulness point to a cold temperament, which requires a different treatment from a warm one, which is revealed through insomnia.
