= Fil Kush =

- (Dari: فيل کش)
- Location within Afghanistan

Highest point
- Elevation: 1,201 m (3,940 ft)
- Parent peak: Hindu Kush
- Coordinates: 33°08′46″N 63°28′46″E

Geography
- Location: Farah Province, Afghanistan
- Parent range: Hindu Kush

Fil Kush (Dari: فيل کش) is a mountain of the Hindu Kush in southwestern Afghanistan. The name of the mountain literally means "elephant killer". It is located in Farah Province.
