= Jihadiyar Sahib =

Deputy Governor of Farah Province

Respected Jihadiyar Sahib
- جهادیار صاحب د

Deputy Governor of Farah
- Incumbent
- Assumed office 7 November 2021
- Governor: Noor Mohammad Rohani

Jihadiyar Sahib (Pashto: جهادیار صاحب د) is a member of the Afghan Taliban militant organization who is currently the deputy governor of Farah province, having been in the post since 7 November 2021.
