= Zendeh Jan District =

Zendeh Jan زنده‌جان
- District
- Location within Afghanistan
- Coordinates: 34°22′10″N 61°43′46″E
- Country: Afghanistan
- Province: Herat Province

Population (2012)
  - Total: 55,500

Zinda Jan District (Persian: ولسوالی زنده‌جان); is located in the central part of Herat Province in Afghanistan. It borders Gulran and Kushk districts to the north, Injil and Guzara districts to the east, Adraskan District to the south and Ghoryan and Kohsan districts to the west. The population is 55,500 (2012 year). The district center is the town of Zendeh Jan, situated in the valley of the Hari River.

== Agriculture ==
The following table demonstrates the total amount of irrigated and rain-fed lands in the district.

Total (jerib)	Irrigated (jerib)	Rainfed (jerib)	Forest (hectare)
24,120	16,600	7,567	0

== District map ==
- Map of Settlements IMMAP, September 2011
