= Gulran =

- Location in Afghanistan
- Coordinates: 35°6′0″N 61°40′12″E
- Country: Afghanistan
- Province: Herat
- District: Gulran
- Elevation: 3,087 ft (941 m)
- Time zone: UTC+4:30

Gulran is a village in Herat Province, Afghanistan. It is the center of the Gulran District. the population is overwhelmingly Tajik with small pockets of Pashtun population.

== Climate ==
Gulran has a cold steppe climate (Köppen: BSk) with very hot summers and cool winters.

Climate data for Gulran
Month	Jan	Feb	Mar	Apr	May	Jun	Jul	Aug	Sep	Oct	Nov	Dec	Year
Daily mean °C (°F)	3.4 (38.1)	5.2 (41.4)	10.2 (50.4)	16.1 (61.0)	21.3 (70.3)	26.3 (79.3)	28.1 (82.6)	26.1 (79.0)	21.3 (70.3)	15.5 (59.9)	9.8 (49.6)	5.6 (42.1)	15.7 (60.3)
Average precipitation mm (inches)	37.6 (1.48)	48.2 (1.90)	57.1 (2.25)	32.3 (1.27)	12.2 (0.48)	0.0 (0.0)	0.0 (0.0)	0.0 (0.0)	0.0 (0.0)	5.2 (0.20)	14.4 (0.57)	27.8 (1.09)	234.8 (9.24)
Average relative humidity (%)	56	61	53	45	30	18	16	17	20	31	48	52	37
Source 1: ClimateCharts
Source 2: World Weather Online (humidity)

== See also ==
- Herat Province
