= Pusht Rod District =

Pusht Rod پشت رود
- District
- Location within Afghanistan
- Coordinates: 32°28′01″N 62°01′48″E
- Country: Afghanistan
- Province: Farah

Pusht Rod (Pashto: پشټ راډ) is a district in Farah province, Afghanistan. Its population, which is mostly Pashtun with a minority of Tajiks, was estimated at 52,000 in September 2004.
