= Bakwa District =

Bakwa بکواه
- District
- Bakwa District
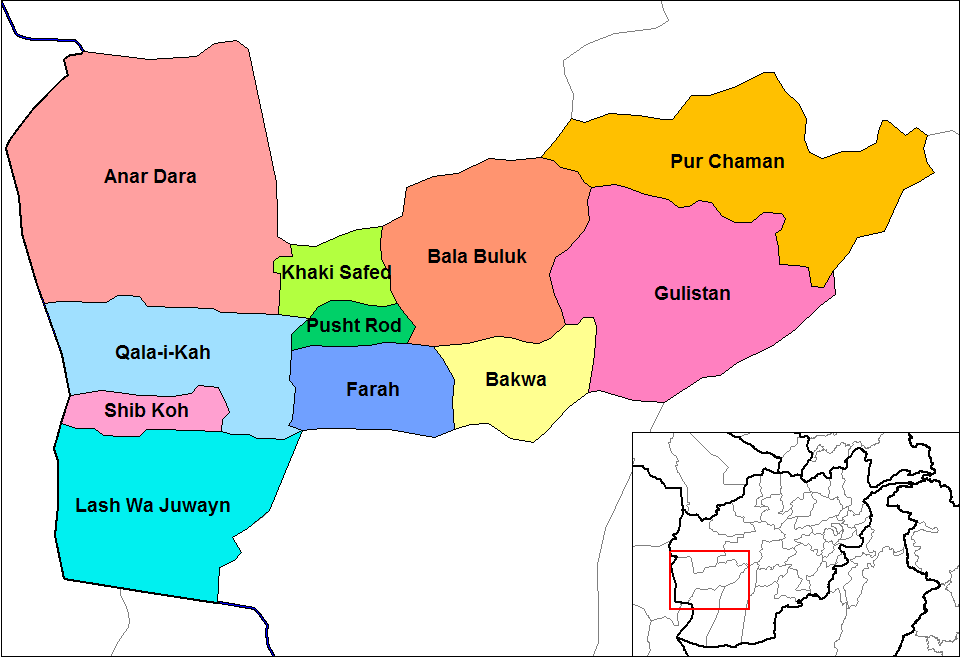
- Map of the Bakwa District within the Farah Province

- Location within Afghanistan
- Coordinates: 32°15′05″N 62°57′27″E
- Country: Afghanistan
- Province: Farah

Government
  - Governor: Haji Maulavi Asif (Taliban)

Population (2004)
  - Total: 79,529
- Control: (Afghanistan) Taliban

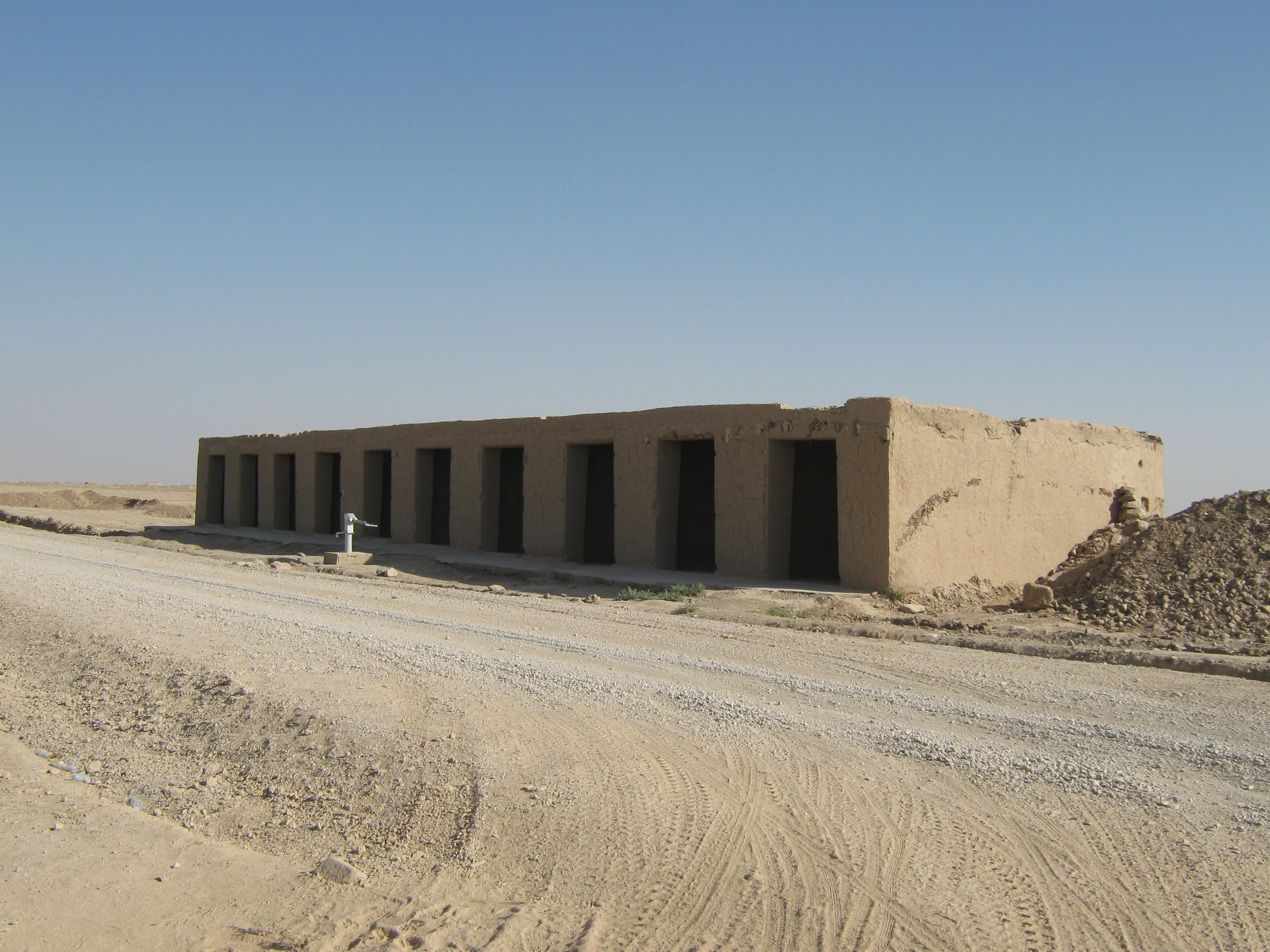
Bakwa District Center Bazaar on Route 515

Bakwa (Pashto: بکوا) is a district in Farah province, Afghanistan. Its population, which is majority Pashtun with a Tajik minority, was estimated at 79,529 in November 2004. The district center is Sultani Bakwa. It is situated at an altitude of 726 m.

== History ==
=== Pre-war ===
The New York Times quoted a local businessman that the district was almost fully empty with nothing but the desert landscape prior to the rise of opium production.

=== War in Afghanistan ===
According to the Afghan government, airstrikes in 2019 against the Taliban in the district destroyed 68 drug labs and killed 150 insurgents. Governor Abdul Ghafoor Mujahid claimed 45 civilians were killed in the strikes, which Defense spokesman Qais Mangal denied.

During the war in Afghanistan, the district, including the town of Shagai was a major hub of production and trade for opium, heroin and methamphetamines.

In 2021, the Taliban captured the district as part of the 2021 Taliban offensive.

Months after the withdrawal of US troops and the takeover by the Taliban, Leader Haibatullah Akhundzada declared that all opium production is prohibited nationwide. Taliban fighters then begin to destroy the remaining labs within the district by setting them on fire, causing farmers to move out of the district or switch to wheat farming. The Taliban appointed governor of the district Haji Maulavi Asif called it "an exam", comparing it to a social experiment.

== Gallery ==
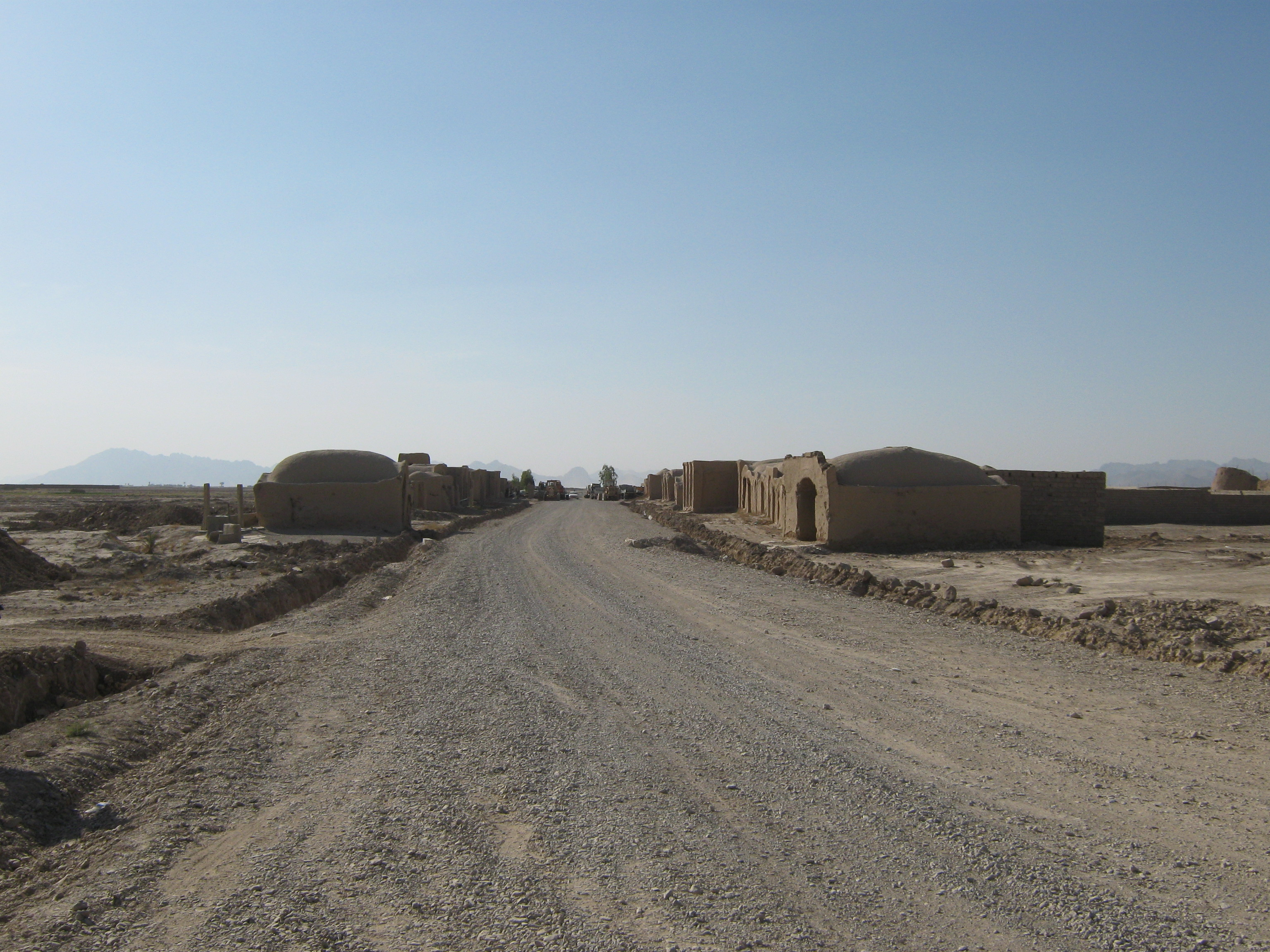
Route 515 in Bakwa
