= Pusht-e-Koh District =

Pusht-e-Koh پشت کوه
- District
- Country: Afghanistan
- Province: Farah

Pusht Koh (Pashto: پشت کوه) is a district in Farah province, Afghanistan. Its population, which is 70% Pashtun and 30% Tajik, was estimated at 35,000 in January 2005.
