= Khaki Safed District =

Khaki Safed
- District
- Location within Afghanistan
- Coordinates: 32°39′14″N 62°06′08″E
- Country: Afghanistan
- Province: Farah

Population (2010)
  - Total: 29,500

Khaki Safed or Speena Khawra (Pashto: سپینه خاوره, "white dust") is a district in Farah province, Afghanistan. Its population was estimated at 43,000 in October 2004. The main village, Khaki Safed (also called Alagadari Pashto: الګاداري ), is situated at 676 m altitude in the central part of the district.

== Security and Politics ==
It was reported on 17 November 2009 that armed Taliban fighters kidnapped 5 civilians. 2 were beheaded and accused of spying while the other 3 were released. According to the Provincial police chief Faqir Mohammad Askar, the victims were innocent government employees.
