= Kushki Kuhna =

- Interactive map of Kushki Kuhna
- Country: Afghanistan
- Province: Herat Province
- District: Kushki Kuhna District
- Elevation: 3,691 ft (1,125 m)
- Time zone: UTC+4:30

Kushki Kuhna is a town and the center of Kushki Kuhna District, Herat Province, Afghanistan. It is located at 34.8714°N 62.5483°E at 1125 m altitude and is 170 km northeast of Herat.

== See also ==
- Herat Province
