= Noor Mohammad Rohani =

Governor of Farah Province

Maulvi Noor Mohammad Rohani
- مولوی نورمحمد روحانی

Governor of Farah
- Incumbent
- Assumed office 7 November 2021
- Prime Minister: Hasan Akhund
- Emir: Hibatullah Akhundzada
- Preceded by: Hizbullah Afghan

Maulvi Noor Mohammad Rohani (Pashto: مولوی نورمحمد روحانی) is a member of the Afghan Taliban militant organization who is currently the governor of Farah province, having been in the post since 7 November 2021.
