= Anar Dara District =

Anar Dara انار دره
- District
- Location within Afghanistan
- Coordinates: 32°46′08″N 61°40′38″E
- Country: Afghanistan
- Province: Farah

Population (2005)
  - Total: 30,000
- Control: (Afghanistan) Taliban

Anar Dara (Dari: انار دره) is a district in Farah province, Afghanistan. Its population, which is approximately 90% Tajik with a Pashtun minority, was estimated at 30,000 in January 2005. Its capital, Anar Dara, is situated at 801 m altitude, with a population of about 13,300 people.

== War in Afghanistan ==
In September 2019, Taliban forces temporarily gained control of the district from Afghan security forces after heavy fighting. According to the spokesperson for Farah province Mohibullah Mohid, two policemen were killed and 8 others wounded.

In December 2020, Taliban forces attacked a police headquarters in the district. According to the Governor of Farah province Muhammad Mujahid, a security force member was killed and two others wounded while several Taliban were killed.

In June 2021, Taliban forces recaptured the district as part of the 2021 Taliban offensive. According to the deputy head of the provincial council Shah Mahmoud Naimi, three policemen were killed and several others wounded. Taliban forces blew up a government building in the district after capturing it.

== Gallery ==
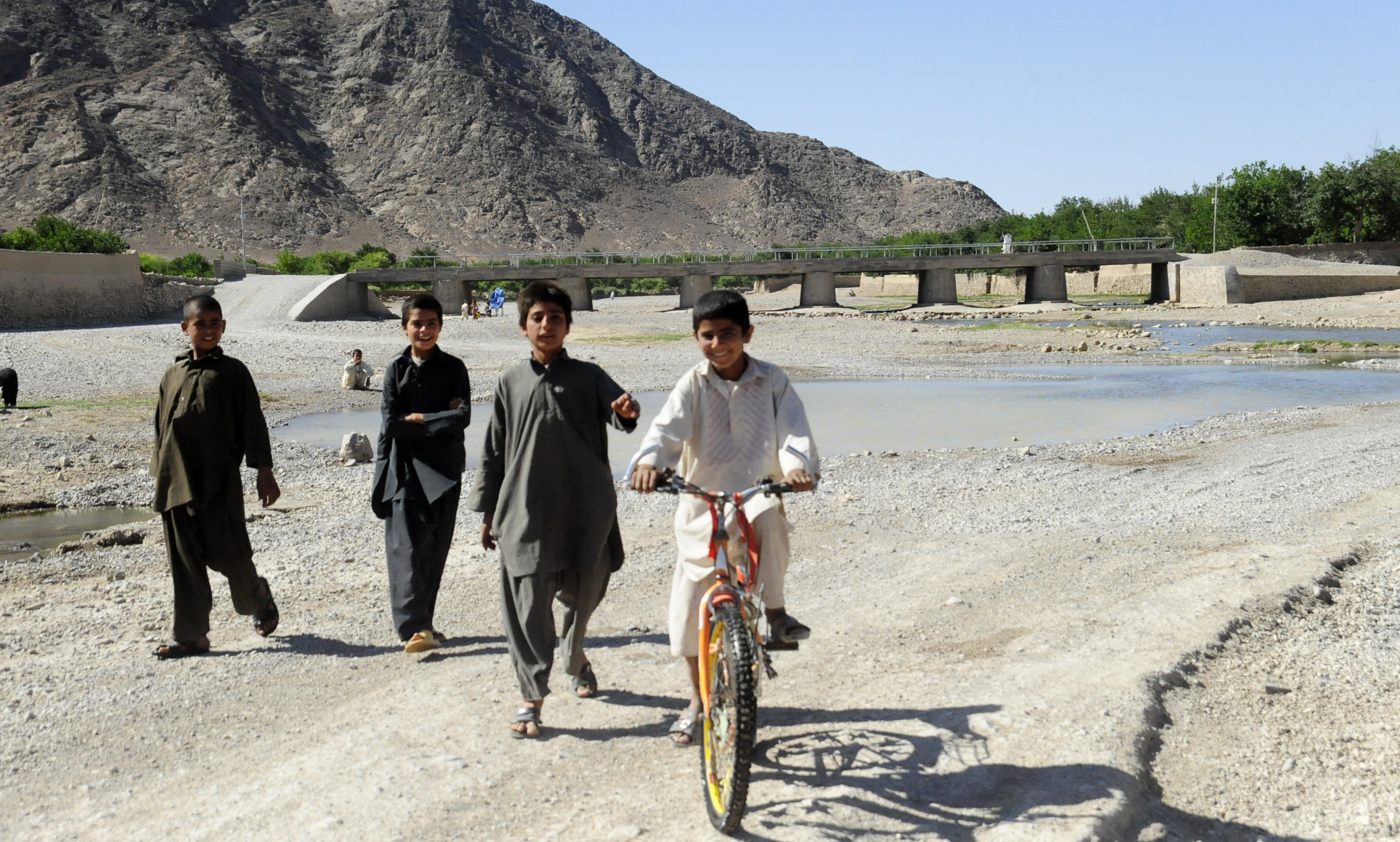
Anar Dara
