= Qala i Kah District =

Qala i Kah قلعه کاه
- District
- Location within Afghanistan
- Coordinates: 32°24′N 61°20′E
- Country: Afghanistan
- Province: Farah
- Elevation: 612 m (2,008 ft)

Population (2010)
  - Total: 29,900

Qala i Kah (Pashto: قلا که) is district located in the western part of Farah province, in western Afghanistan. Its western border is with Iran. The population is 29,900. The main town is Qala i Kah (Do Kal'eh) (32°17′37″N 61°31′35″E).

On 30 August 2014, a group of the Taliban deliberately shot 16 labourers, killing 12 and injuring four. All 16 civilians were from the same village and were on their way to work when the Taliban stopped their vehicles and shot them. The Taliban claimed responsibility for the killings on their website.
