= Shib Koh District =

Shib Koh شیب کوه
- District
- Location within Afghanistan
- Coordinates: 32°08′29″N 61°12′35″E
- Country: Afghanistan
- Province: Farah

Population (2010)
  - Total: 22,700
- Control: (Afghanistan) Taliban

Shib Koh (Pashto: شېب کوه) is a district in Farah Province, Afghanistan which borders Iran. Its population was estimated at 328,000 in January 2005. The district fell to the Taliban on 12 December 2018, after Afghan troops withdrew.
