= Kushk River =

Coordinates: 36.0502°N 62.7397°E

Kushk
- Native name: Guşgy (Turkmen)

Location
- Country: Turkmenistan
- Towns/Cities: Kushk

Physical characteristics
- Source: Aq Robat and Galleh Chagar Rivers
  - location: Paropamisus mountains north-western Afghanistan
- Mouth: Morghāb River
  - location: Marghab District, Afghanistan
- Length: 150 mi (240 km)
- Discharge
  - average: 0.11 cubic km

The Kushk (known in Turkmenistan as Guşgy) is a river which, for a portion of its course, forms the boundary between Afghanistan and Turkmenistan, and used to form part of the southernmost border of the Russian Empire and the Soviet Union. The Kushk is fed by the Aq Robat and Galleh Chagar rivers in north-western Afghanistan. After 150 km, it flows into the Murghab River.

== Etymology ==
It is also known as Kushka River. The river gives its name to Kushk, the chief town in the Afghan province of Herat, situated some 32 kilometres (20 mi) from the Turkmenistan border, and to Kushka (now Serhetabat), a former military post on the border of Turkmenistan. There it joins Egriyok River and then pours into Morghāb River. In the summer months, parts of the river are dry but in general the river irrigates farmland in the lower parts.

== Geography ==
One bridge over the river was built in 1960, it carries a railroad track. Linking Torghundi with Serhetabat. It later had a road bridge built as well. For about 16 km of its path, the Kushk river marks the border between Afghanistan and Turkmenistan. This river flows towards northwest and after passing the town of Koshk-e Kohneh joins Moqor river.

The Kushk was once also crossed by the Chahil Dukhteran Bridge (or 'Pul-i-Kishti'), now in ruins.

=== Ecological significance ===
The region of the Kushka River was home to the Persian leopard. In the past, the Caspian tiger and Asiatic cheetah had occurred here.

== See also ==
- Badhyz State Nature Reserve
- Tejen River
