= Kushk District =

Kushk کوشک
- District
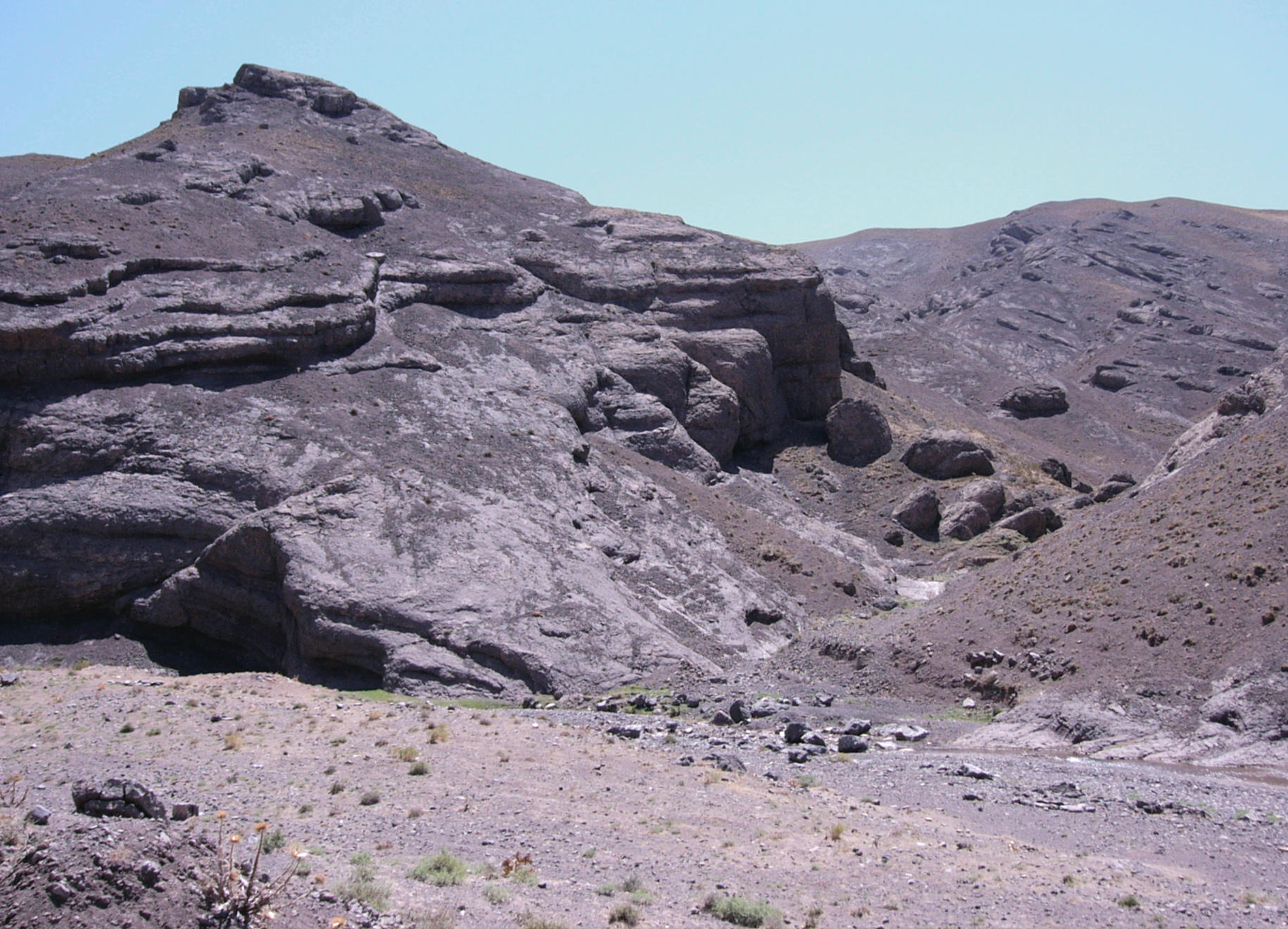
- Rocks

- Location within Afghanistan
- Coordinates: 35°03′34″N 62°17′43″E
- Country: Afghanistan
- Province: Herat Province

Population (2012)
  - Total: 121,000

Kushk District is situated in the northern part of Herat Province, Afghanistan and also may be referred to as Rubat-i-Sangin or Rabat-e-Sangi. It borders Turkmenistan to the north, Gulran District to the west, Zinda Jan District, Injil District and Karukh District to the south and Kushki Kuhna District to the east. The population is 121,000 (2012).

The main road from Herat to Kushka in Turkmenistan passes through the district, along the Kushk River. Torghundi is the main border crossing town.

== Agriculture ==
The following table demonstrates the total amount of irrigated and rain-fed lands in the district.

Total (Jereb)	Irrigated (Jereb)	Rainfed (Jereb)	Forest (Hectare)
458,207	66,753	391,454	93

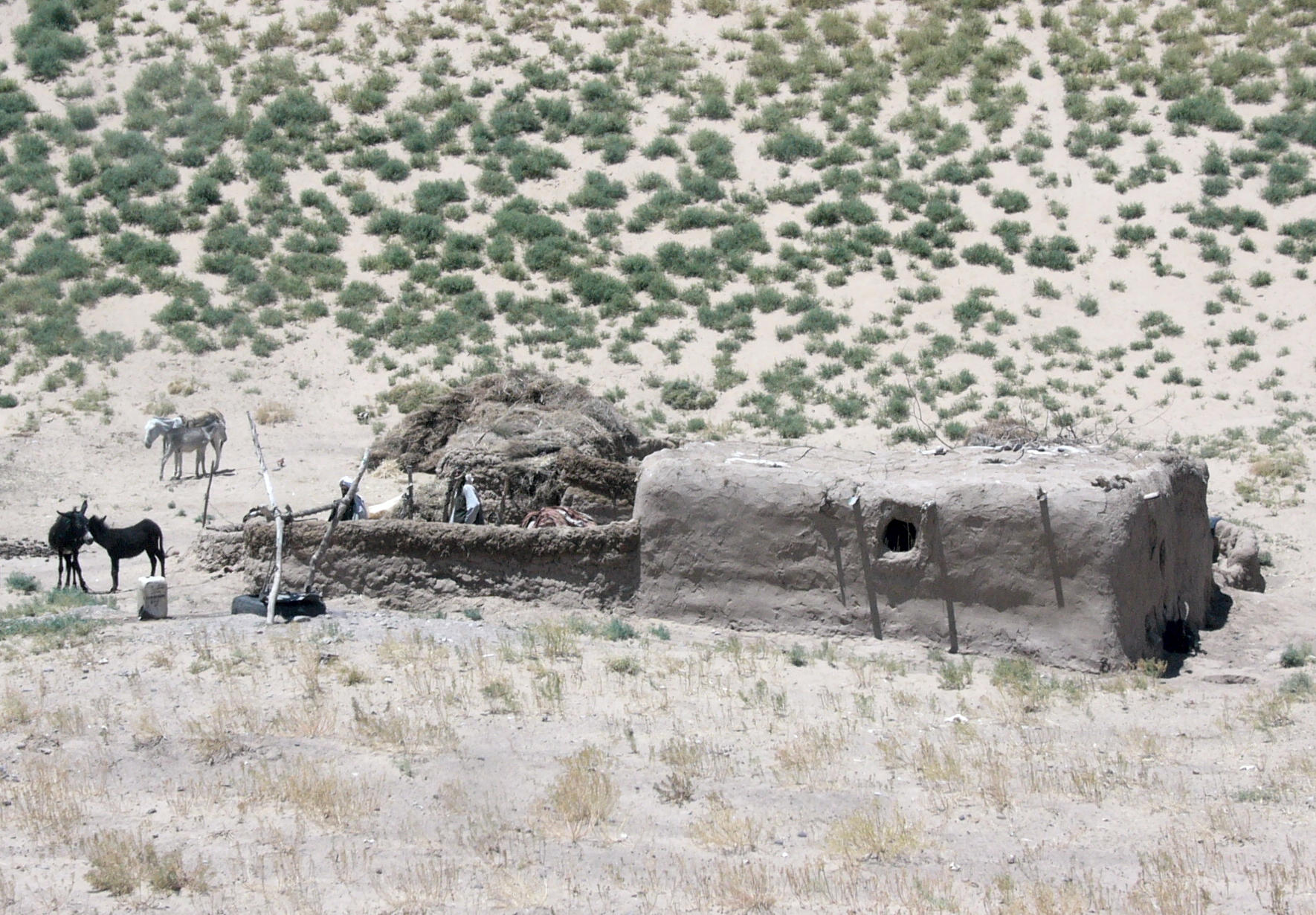
Farm
