= Kushki Kuhna District =

Kushki Kuhna کشک کهنه
- District
- Location within Afghanistan
- Coordinates: 34°52′17″N 62°32′54″E
- Country: Afghanistan
- Province: Herat Province

Population (2012)
  - Total: 44,400

Kushki Kuhna is a district of Herat province in northwestern Afghanistan. It is situated in the northern part of the province. It borders Kushk District to the west, the nation of Turkmenistan to the north, Badghis Province to the east, and Karukh District to the south. The population Kushki Kuhna is 44,400 (as of 2012), which includes the following ethnic groups: 55% Tajik, 40% Pashtun and 5% Hazara.

The headquarters or district center is also known as Kushki Kuhna. The main source of income is the agriculture. The infrastructure, health and education systems have been improved since 2002.

== Agriculture ==
The following table demonstrates the total amount of irrigated and rain-fed lands in the district.

Total (Jerib)	Irrigated (Jerib)	Rainfed (Jerib)	Forest (Hectare)
20,000	2,000	18,000	100,000

== See also ==
- Districts of Afghanistan
