= Gulran District =

Gulran گلران
- District
- Location within Afghanistan
- Coordinates: 35°06′00″N 61°40′12″E
- Country: Afghanistan
- Province: Herat Province

Area
  - Total: 6,078 km^{2} (2,347 sq mi)

Population (2012)
  - Total: 91,500

Gulran District (Pashto: ګلران) is situated in northwestern part of Herat province, Afghanistan and borders Iran to the west, Turkmenistan to the north, Kushk District to the east, and Zinda Jan District and Kohsan District to the south. The population is 91,500 (2012). The district center is the village of Gulran. There are no mountains in the district.
