= Goshta District =

Coordinates: 34°21′22″N 70°46′20″E

- District
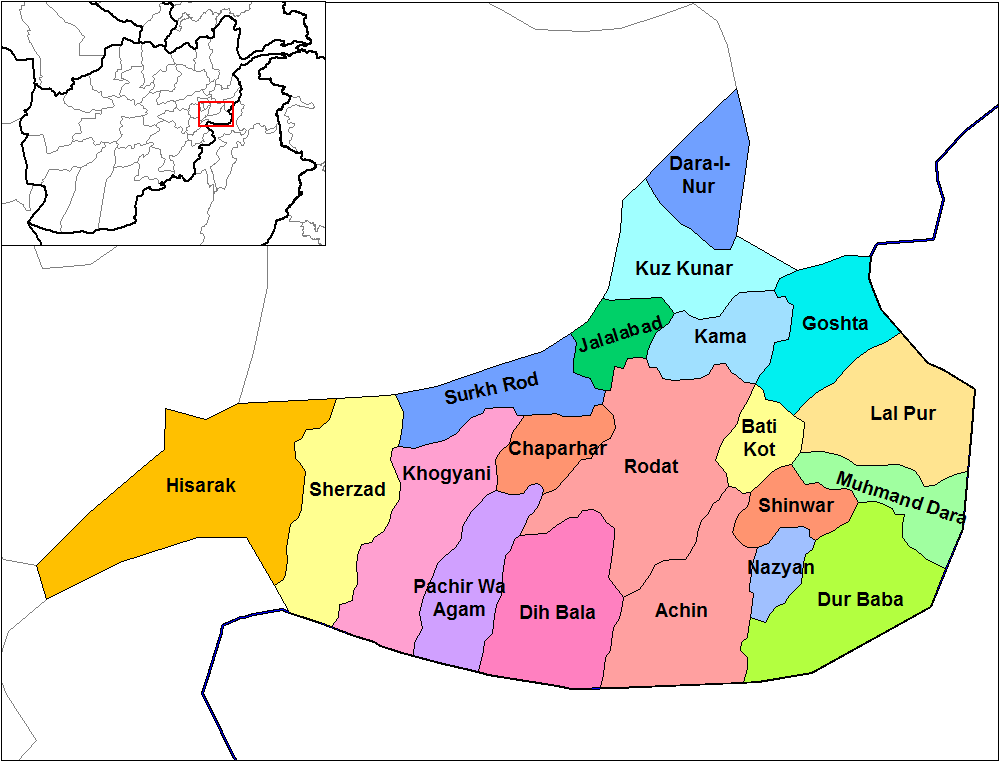
- Goshta District, Nangarhar Province.
- Country: Afghanistan
- Province: Nangarhar Province
- Capital: Goshta

Population (2002)
  - Total: 160,000
- Time zone: UTC+4:30 (Afghanistan Standard Time)

Goshta (Pashto: ګوشتا) is a district located in the northeast of Nangarhar Province, Afghanistan and borders Durand Line between Afghanistan and Pakistan. The district's population is Pashtun and was estimated at 160,000 in 2002, of whom 30,000 were children under 12. The district is within the heartland of the Mohmand tribe of Pashtuns. The district centre is the village of Goshta, on the Kabul River.

== Location and Economy ==
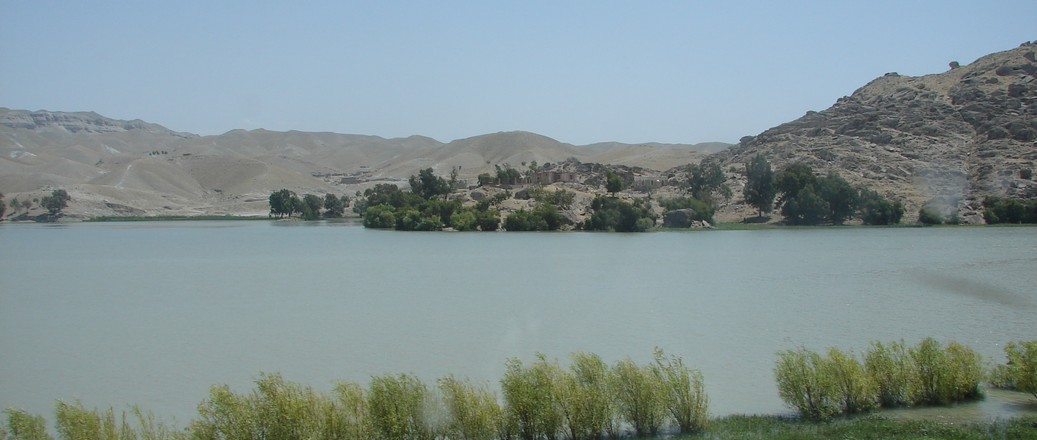
Kunar River Lake in Nangarhar

The Goshta district is located on the Durand Line between Afghanistan and the Khyber Pakhtunkhwa province of Pakistan. From the highlands that define the border, dry hilly country with seasonal streams slopes down to the flat land along the north side of the Kunar river valley where most of the people live, at an elevation of about 540 m. Average temperatures in the valley range from 3^{o} in January to 27^{o} in July. Precipitation is low, perhaps 150mm per year, mostly falling in the spring.

Agriculture is the main source of income. Crops include wheat, corn, sugar cane and rice. At times, opium poppies have been an important crop. Goshta's residents do not have a modern water supply system for their crops. They traditionally drain water from the Kunar river, which flows along the south of the district, using hand pumps and shallow wells. Floods often destroy valuable fields. In the hill country, water must often be carried long distances by pack animal. Most villagers do not have access to potable water.

== Villages and tribes ==
Goshta is the home to the Khwaizi and Baize clans, part of Mohmand Pashtun tribes. There are many sub tribes. In the past, the Kunar (Chitral) valley that runs through the Goshta district was an important trade route from the Pamir Mountains' passes, Kabul and Jalalabad down to the plains of the Punjab. The people of Goshta have strong cultural and historical links to the people of Peshawar, further down the valley in Pakistan.

Large villages include Goshta, Khwaizi, Arkhai, Warsak, Ragha, Dawar khel, Khoga Khel, Mama Khel, Ala Khail, Tootkai and Bachahe Ghondey. In 2002, the UNHCR reported that the head of the District controlled only 18 major villages. The remaining 32 small villages, which are closer to the border of Pakistan, were beyond the control of the head of the district. The Pakistan Government exercised significant influence in these areas and provided some facilities such as roads and electricity.

== Education ==
Literacy is poor. According to a survey held by Saanga, a local magazine, in 2003, 7% of the population is educated. The UN estimated that only 2% were literate. Goshta have 5 high schools for boys (Abdul Hameed Momand High School), one high for girls primary school for girls and 15 primary schools, only three of which are for girls. There are also two religious schools one is Warsak village and other in the Arkhi

== Politics ==
The majority of the people of Goshta are members of the Mujahedeen. However, there are followers of Khalq Party as well as Mujahedeen political movements. The local shura is consulted on occasion by the head of the district to share information and participate in decision-making.

== Sports ==
The main sports are cricket, volleyball, nartopa swimming, wrestling, and local games called Khusay and Dabee Toona (a game similar to baseball). And this district also has a good cricket team which had participated in international games.

== History ==
In a strategic location, Goshta has witnessed many invasions. For much of its history under Persian control, it has been invaded by Greeks, Bactrians, Chingisids and others. It was a field of war against British Raj during the nineteenth century, starting with the First Anglo-Afghan War (1839 to 1842), with several later conflicts. During the "Mohmand Disturbances" of 1937–1938 British Forces were thrown back by the army of local people who voluntarily participated in war under the command of Chaknawar Mullah Sahib there is a shrine of Shaheed Kharoot who was khowaizi belonging to Mir Qala fought against British soldiers under the command of Chaknawar Mullah Sahib and got martyred (Shaheed) after killing few British Soldiers.

Afghanistan was invaded by the Soviets in the late nineteen seventies. In the Soviet–Afghan War, local people took up their weapons to defend their homeland against the Russians. The signs of the battle can still be seen in the form of ruins left behind: clinics, mosques, bridges, roads, schools and houses were destroyed in Goshta, as throughout Afghanistan. The war left many dead, disabled, widows and orphans.

== Current issues ==
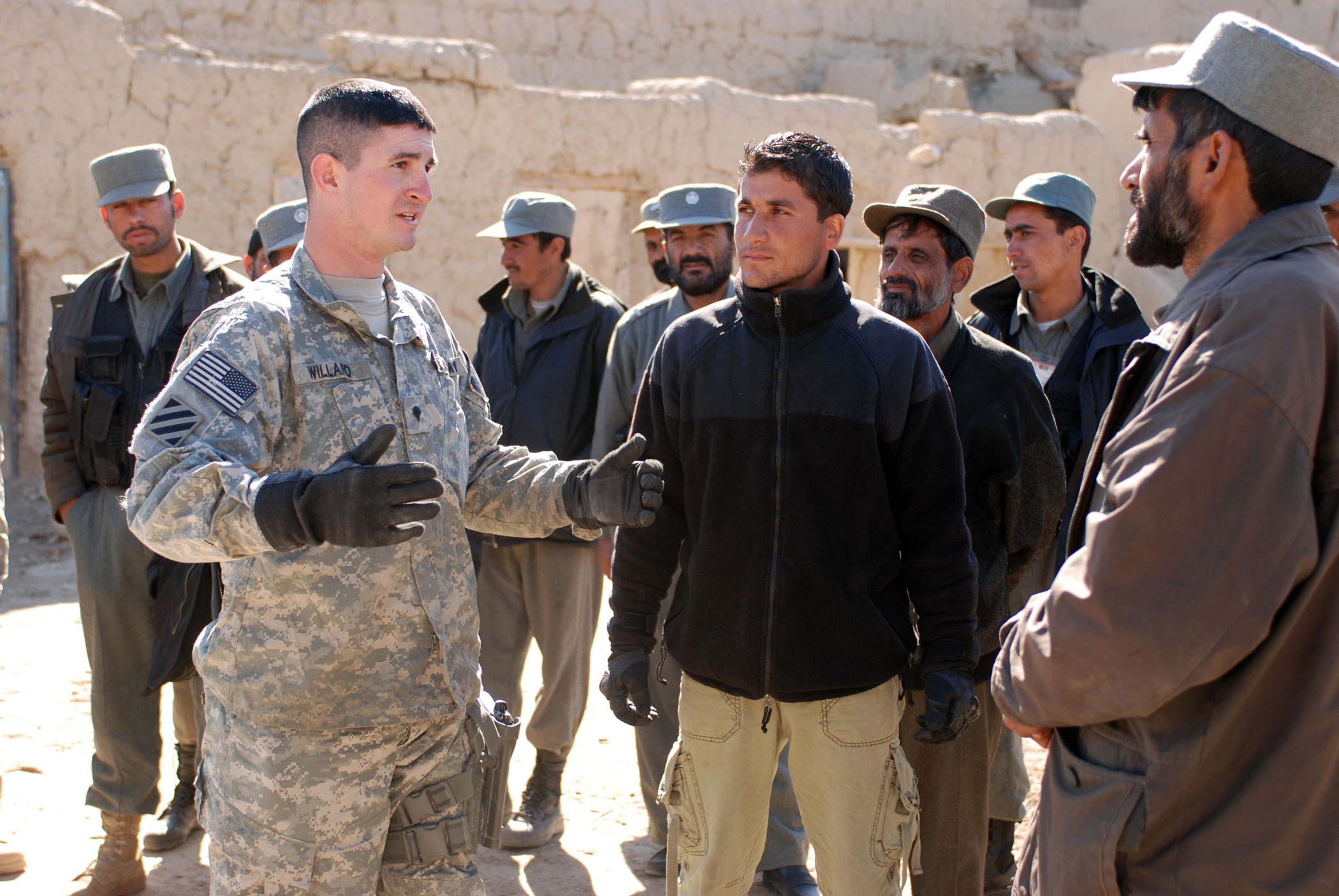
US soldier teaches a class on vehicle searches to Afghan National Policemen in Nangarhar Province

More recently, Goshta has been afflicted by the war on terror against Al-Qaeda and the Taliban since 2001. In addition to the presence of Afghan government troops, NATO forces and Taliban fighters, various Saanga magazine and IWPR news agency's reports in 2003–2005 indicate that troops from Pakistan have made incursions into the province. NATO troops are assisting government forces in attempting to improve the situation, but face major problems.
