= Farah Province =

Province of Afghanistan

Farah فراه
- Province
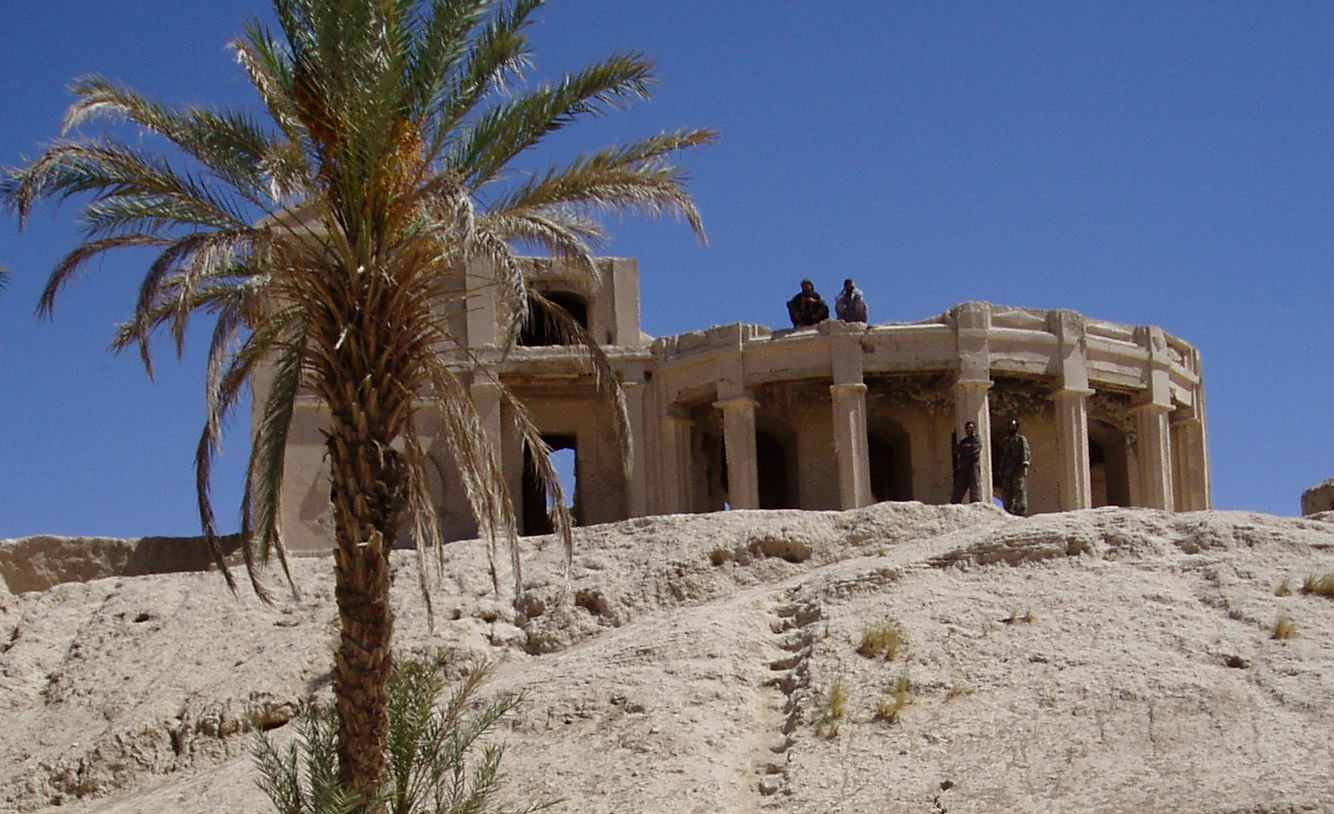
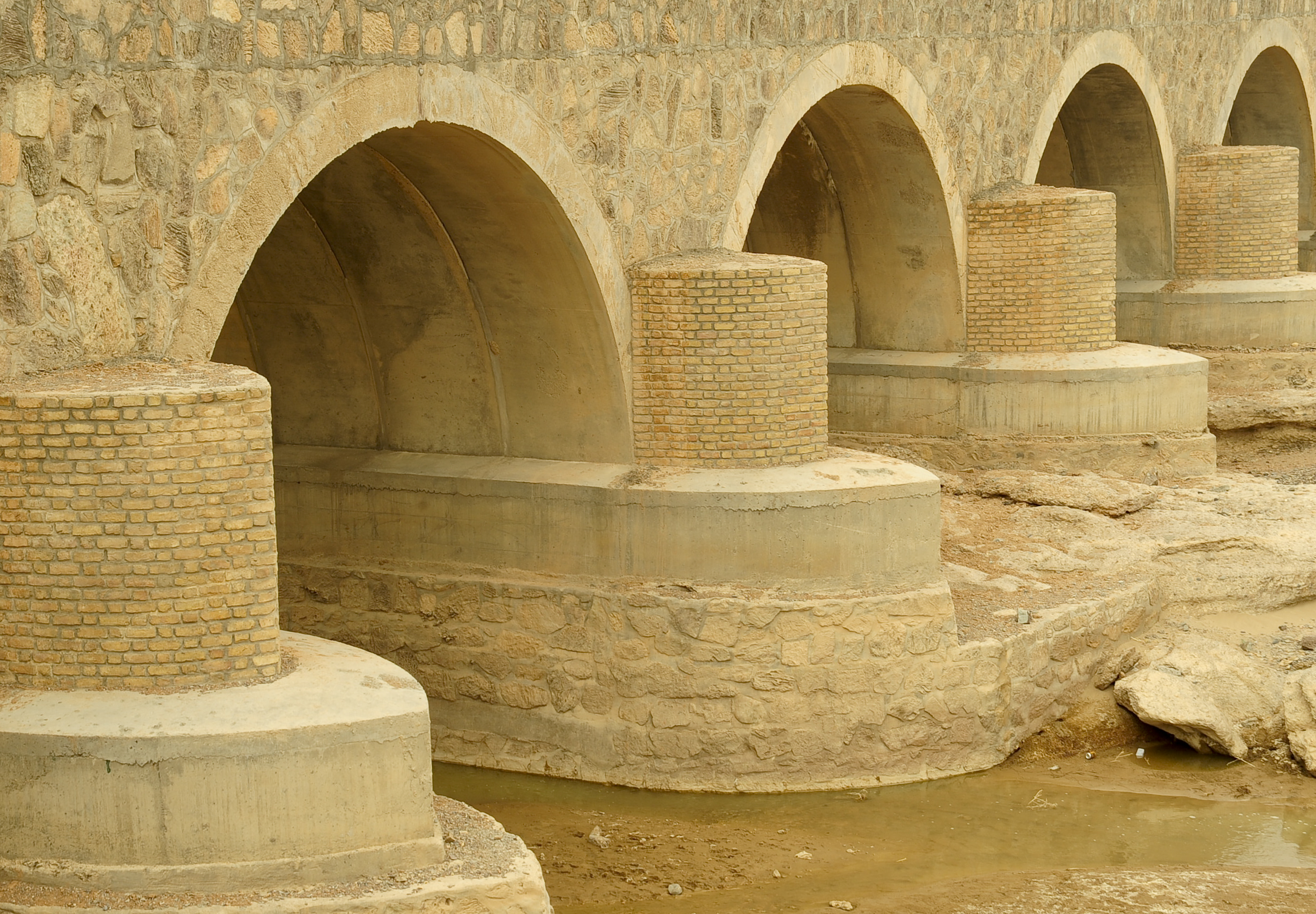
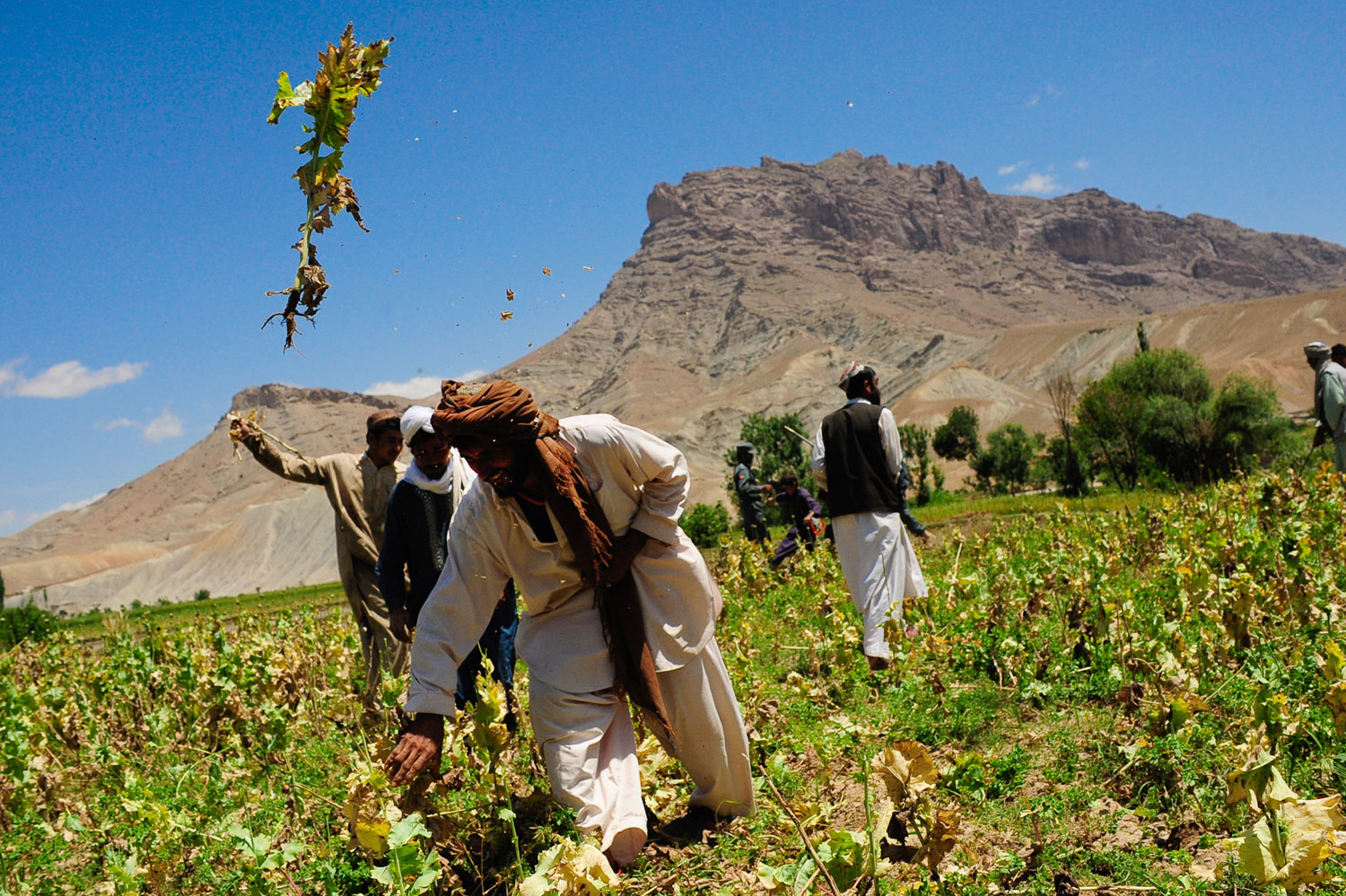
- From the top, Farah Citadel, Togj Bridge, Pur Chaman District

- Map of Afghanistan with Farah highlighted
- Coordinates (Capital): 32.5°N 63.5°E
- Country: Afghanistan
- Capital: Farah

Government
  - Governor: Noor Mohammad Rohani
  - Deputy Governor: Jihadiyar Sahib
  - Police Chief: Haji Sahib Masoom

Area
  - Total: 48,470.9 km^{2} (18,714.7 sq mi)

Population (2021)
  - Total: 573,146
  - Density: 11.8245/km^{2} (30.6254/sq mi)
- Time zone: UTC+4:30 (Afghanistan Time)
- Postal code: 31XX
- ISO 3166 code: AF-FRA
- Main languages: Pashto

Farah (Pashto, (Note: Pashto pronunciation: [pa.rɑ, fa.rɑ]) Dari: (Note: Dari pronunciation: [fä.ɾɑ́ː]) فراه) is one of the 34 provinces of Afghanistan, located in the western part of the country on the border with Iran. It is a spacious and sparsely populated province, divided into eleven districts and contains hundreds of villages. It has a population of about 563,026, mostly a rural tribal society. The Pashtuns of Farah speak southern dialect (Kandahari Pashto) and mostly belongs to the Durrani clan of Pashtuns. The Farah Airport is located near the city of Farah, which serves as the capital of the province. Farah is linked with Iran via the Iranian border town of Mahirud. The famous tourism sites of the province include Pul Garden, New Garden, Kafee Garden, shrine of Sultan Amir and Kafer castle.

Geographically the province is approximately 48,000 square kilometres (19,000 sq mi), roughly twice the size of Maryland, or half the size of South Korea. The province is bounded on the north by Herat, on the northeast by Ghor, the southeast by Helmand, the south by Nimroz, and on the west by Iran. It is the fourth largest province in Afghanistan by area, but the second least densely populated province.

== History ==
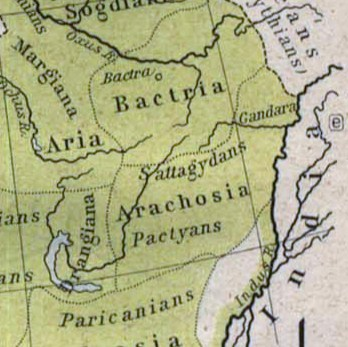
The ancient Drangiana, between Ariana and Arachosia, during 500 BC.

Shahr-e Kohne ("Old City") or Fereydun Shahr ("City of Fereydoon") is located in Farah city. This ancient city is more than 3000 years old. It was one of the ancient places of the Persian kings, as Farah belonged historically to the Iranian empires. The name "Fereydun" here refers to a hero of the Persian epic Shahnameh.

The territory was known around 500 BC as Drangiana, with Arachosia being to the east and Ariana to the north. It was part of the Median Empire followed by the Achaemenids. In 330 BC Alexander the Great took possession of the land and made it part of his empire. Upon Alexander's untimely death in 323 BC the region, along with the rest of his vast empire, was fought over by his generals all vying to be his successor. Eventually several of these were successful in carving out parts of Alexander's empire for themselves thereby becoming his official successors or Diadochi. One of these generals, Seleucus, made this region part of his domain giving it his name as the Seleucid Empire. They were replaced by other rulers and the area eventually fell to the Sassanids, then to the Arab Muslims. The Saffarids rose to power in 867 AD in Zaranj and made Farah part of their empire. By the 10th century the province became part of the Ghaznavid Empire, whose capital was located in Ghazni. They were replaced by the Ghurids and then after a century later the area saw the Mongol invasion.

The province was taken by Timur and eventually fell to the Safavid dynasty. It had been lost by the Safavids to the Uzbeks of Transoxiana, but was regained following a Safavid counter-offensive around 1600 CE, along with Herat and Sabzavar. In 1709, the Afghans gained independence from the Safavids and Farah became part of the Hotaki Empire. By 1747, it became part of Ahmad Shah Durrani's last Afghan empire. During the 19th century, the British army passed through the province to support Afghan forces in Herat Province against the invading Persians.

Following the Marxist revolution in 1978, Farah was one of the cities in which civilian massacres were carried out by the now-dominant Khalqi communists against their political, ethnic, and religious opponents. At the start of the 1980s, the majority of Farah was allied with the Harakat-i-Inqilab-i-Islami movement, but after 1981 the province split along linguistic lines, with Pashto-speaking opponents of the communist government remaining with Harakat, Group-e-Malema (Teacher Group) and Tajiks moving to the Jamiat-e Islami.

Following the 1992 collapse of the communist-backed Democratic Republic of Afghanistan, Farah Province, unlike many other provinces was relatively peaceful. Most of the Farah Mujahideen belonged to Harakat Islami of Malavi Khalas, Group-e-Malema (Teacher Group), Hizb-e-Islami and Jamiat Islami.

A 1995 Oxfam report lists Farah as "severely mined", and indicated that Farah was particularly problematic due to the wide variety of mine devices employed there, as well as usage of mines to deny access to irrigation systems. By late 1995, the stalemate broke as the Taliban counterattacked after Ismail Khan's failed drive to Kandahar, and all of Farah fell as the Taliban swept to take Herat on 5 September 1995.

=== Recent history up to 2009 ===
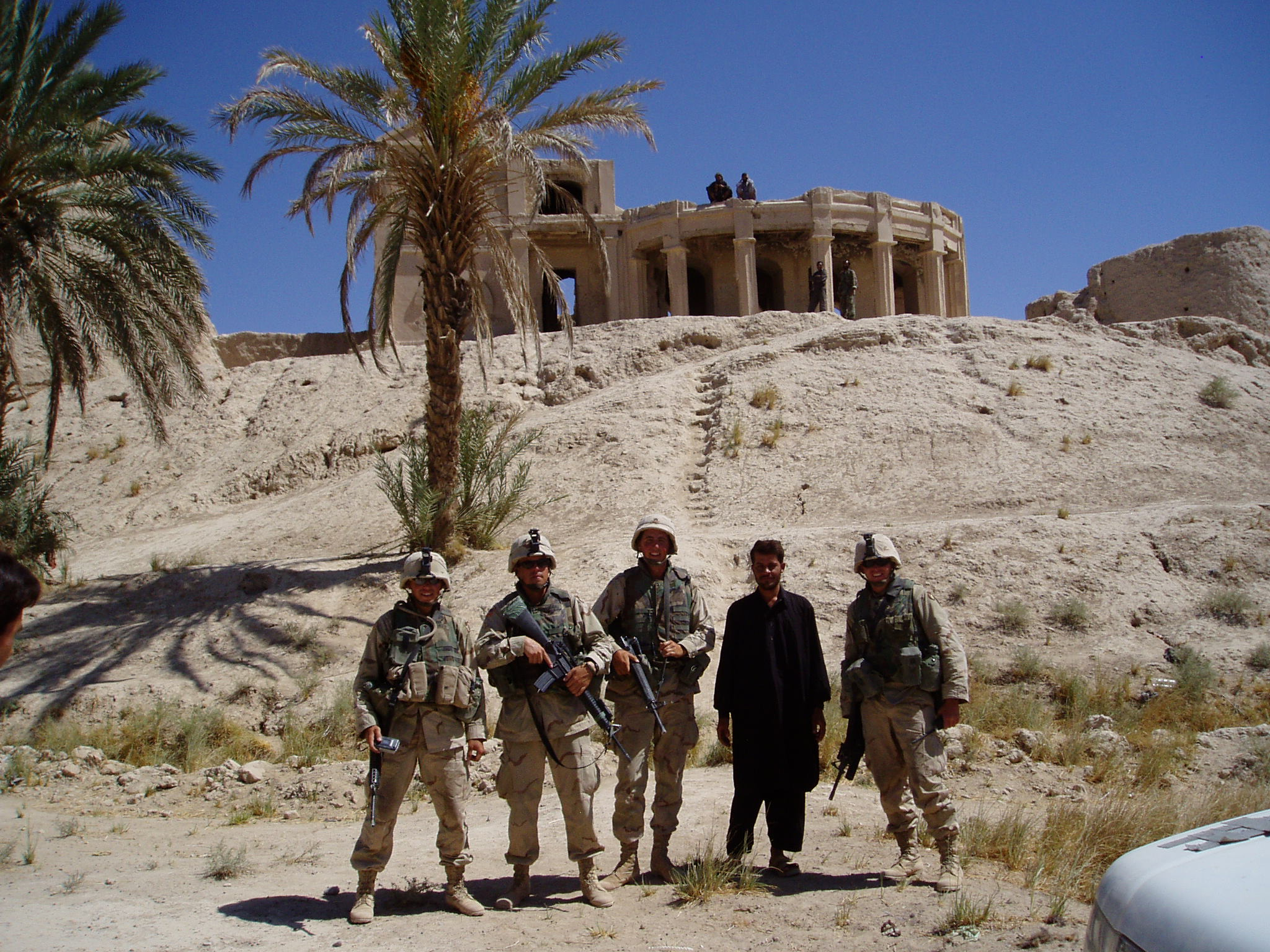
U.S. forces outside the Citadel of Alexander the Great near the city of Farah in 2004.

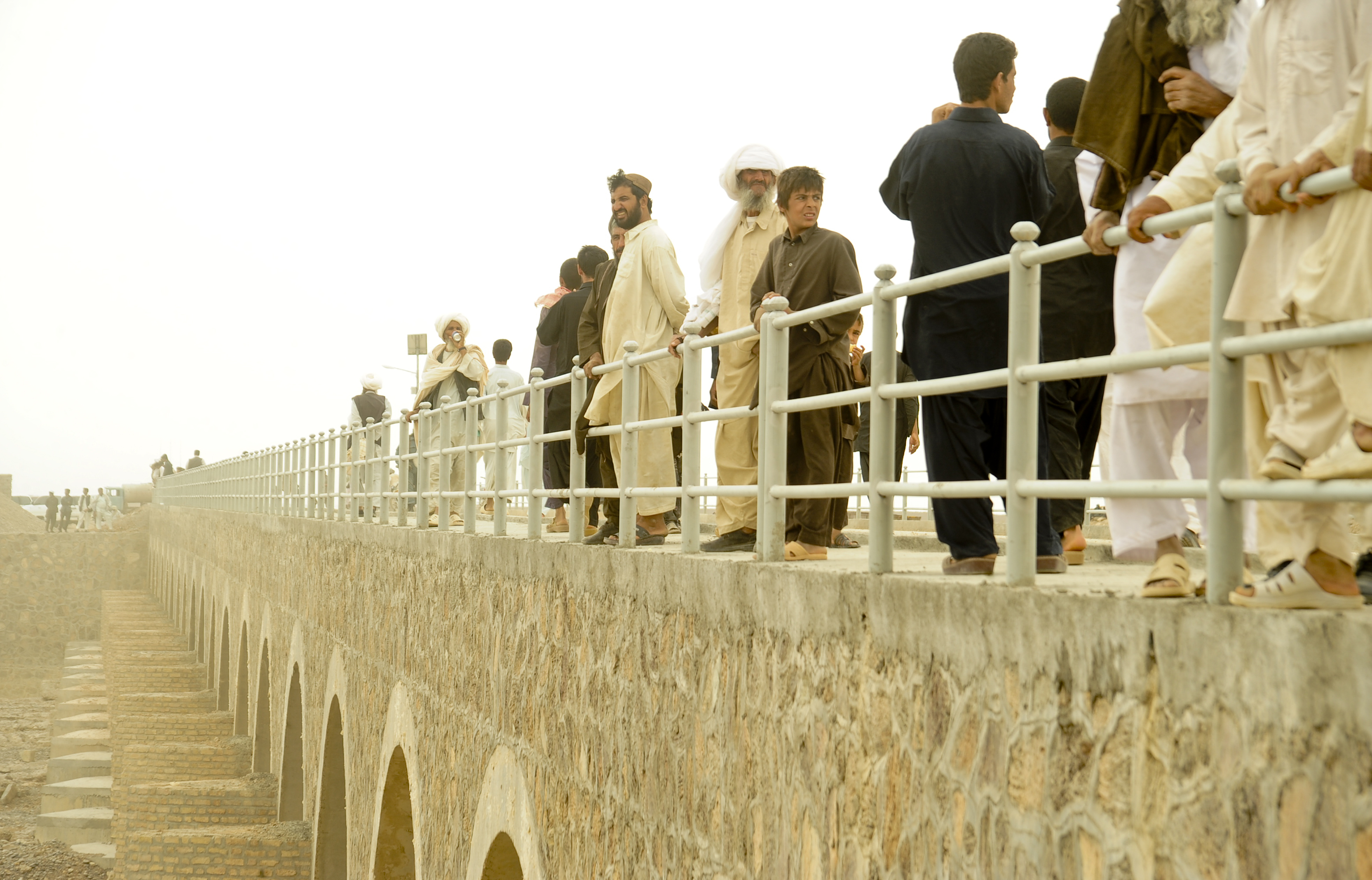
The Togj bridge in Farah Afghanistan was rebuilt by the Provincial Reconstruction Team in 2010

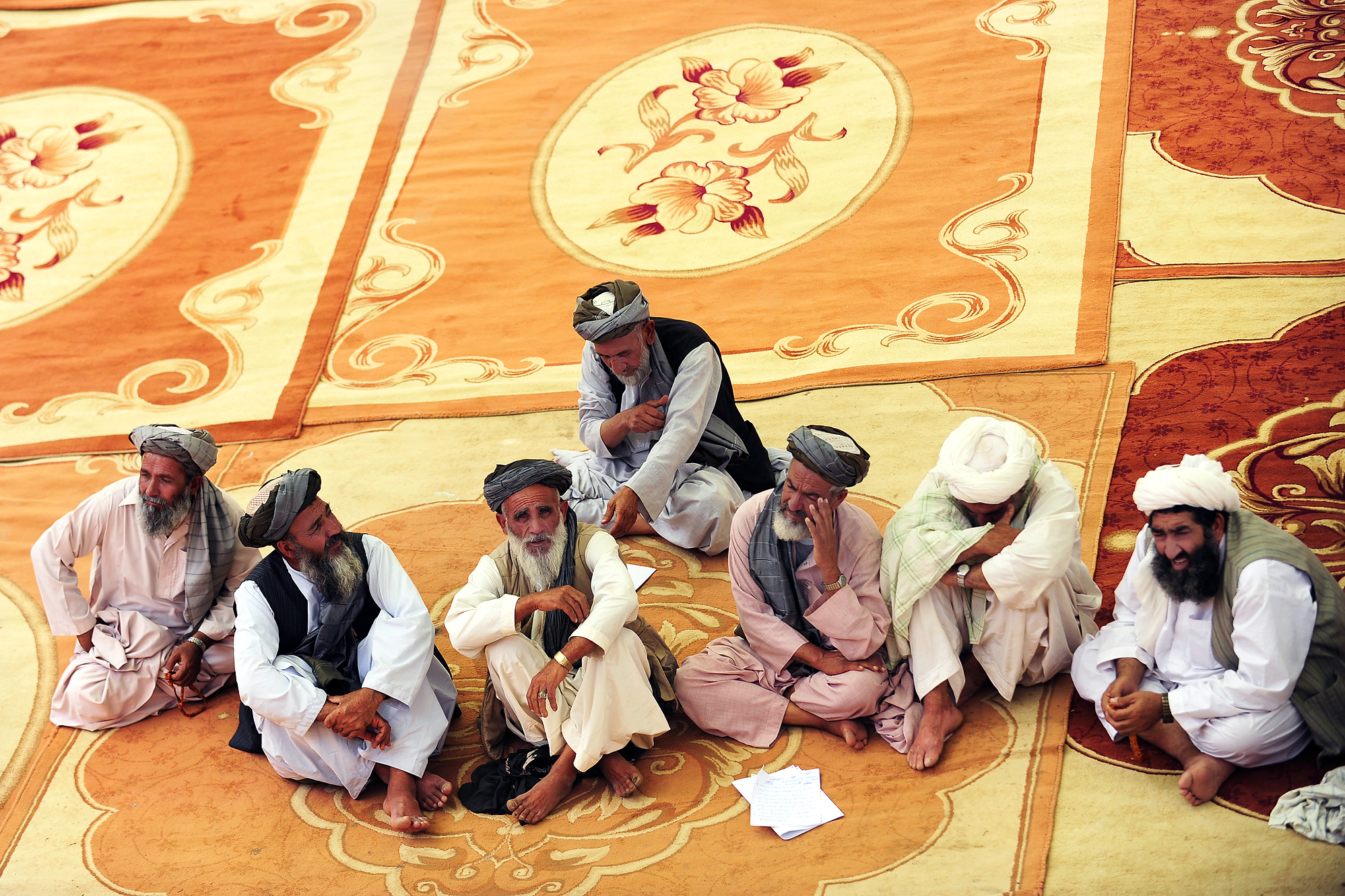
Village elders attend the graduation ceremony for the first Afghan local police unit in the Bala Baluk district.

Due to its isolation from the Taliban's area of focus, Farah exerted some small level of local control during Taliban rule. By the end of the Taliban period, there were eight United Nations Development Program (UNDP) schools, for both boys and girls, recognized and supported by the Taliban in Kandahar and Farah. UNDP noted that the local authorities in Farah were "particularly cooperative" on the subject.

Following the Coalition entry and union with the Northern Alliance after September 11, 2001, the Taliban withdrew from Farah due to the heavy Coalition aerial campaign, though ground troops were not sent to the province until some time later.

Farah witnessed heavy clashes after the US backed overthrow of the Taliban in 2001, and is being considered insecure, relative to many parts of the country. Although there was sporadic heavy combat in the Bala Baluk, Bakwa, Khak-e-Safid, Pusht-e-Road and Gulestan districts. Due to its proximity to the restive Helmand and Uruzgan provinces, Farah experienced problems with roaming insurgent gangs moving through the province and occupying parts of the province for brief periods of time. Incidents of this type have increased as Taliban fighters face heavy pressure from the International Security Assistance Force (ISAF) offensives in the south.

The roads in Farah province have seen massive improvement since May 2005 and are still being improved to date April 2006. The education system greatly improved and a large number of illegal weapons were collected and destroyed in the province as testimony to the Provincial Reconstruction Team. The United States built a base at Farah Airport, which is being expanded and also houses the Afghan National Security Forces (ANFS).

In May 2009, an American airstrike in the village of Granai in Bala Buluk District occurred that killed a large number of civilians. According to The New York Times, the villagers said that 147 were killed, an independent Afghan human rights group put the number of killed at 117. The Americans claimed the airstrike was targeting Taliban militants, but villagers said that the Taliban had left by the time the airstrike occurred. On May 19, the U.S. Ambassador to Afghanistan Karl Eikenberry visited Farah town to talk with the survivors. He promised that "the United States will work tirelessly with your government, army and police to find ways to reduce the price paid by civilians, and avoid tragedies like what occurred in Bala Baluk."

== Administrative divisions ==
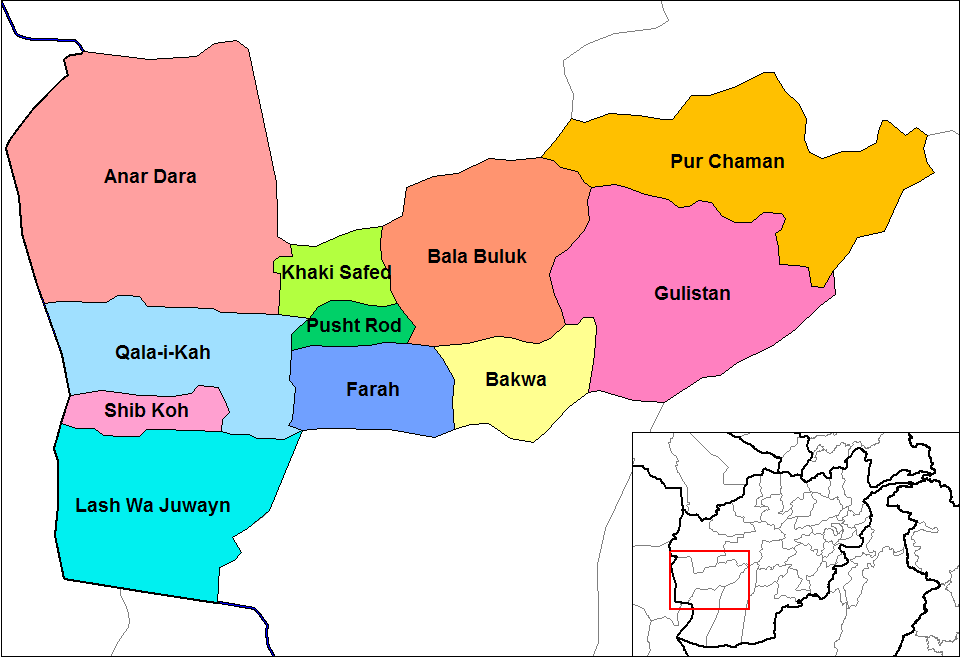
Map of the districts of Farah as of January 2004, prior to the redrawing of provincial and district boundaries later that year

District	Capital	Population (2020)	Area in km^{2}	Pop. density per km^{2}	Ethnic composition (Note: Note: "Predominantely" or "dominated" is interpreted as 99%, "majority" as 70%, "mixed" as 1/(number of ethnicities), "minority" as 30% and "few" or "some" as 1%.)
Anar Dara		31,487	1,703	18	70% Tajiks, 30% Pashtuns.
Bakwa		40,124	2,324	17	100% Pashtuns.
Bala Buluk		80,778	5,525	15	95% Pashtuns, 5% Tajiks.
Farah	Farah	128,047	3,588	36	85% Pashtuns, 10% Tajiks, 5% others.
Gulistan		49,025	6,576	7	80% Pashtuns, 20% Tajiks.
Khaki Safed		34,277	1,938	18	99% Pashtuns, 1% Tajiks.
Lash Wa Juwayn		31,621	5,323	6	50% Pashtuns, 50% Tajiks.
Pur Chaman		60,450	6,188	10	95% Tajiks, 5% Pashtuns.
Pusht Rod		45,969	327	141	99% Pashtuns, 1% Tajiks.
Qala-I-Kah/ Pusht-e-Koh		34,809	4,485	8	70% Pashtuns, 30% Tajiks.
Shib Koh		26,439	2,928	9	70% Pashtuns, 15% Tajiks, 15% others.
Farah		563,026	49,339	11	73.8% Pashtuns, 24.4% Tajiks, 1.8% others.

== Economy ==
=== Agriculture and mining ===
Farah's economy is overwhelmingly agricultural. The province has minerals such as gypsum, lime and construction stones, uranium ore, and copper. More than 1300 workers are employed by 15 manufacturing firms in the province. 74% of rural households reported either agriculture or livestock to be their main source of income and 24% reported that trade and service (including non-farm labor) to their main source of income.

=== Transportation ===
The Farah Airport is located next to the city of Farah and as of May 2014 had regularly scheduled flights to Herat.

The major road is Route 515 which connects Farah to the Ring Road between Herat and Kandahar. Both roads were improved in 2009 in coordination with several ISAF countries.

== Demographics ==
=== Population ===
As of 2021, the total population of Farah province is about 573,146.

=== Ethnicity, languages and religion ===
Farah is predominately tribal and a rural society. Majority of the province is populated by Pashtuns, followed by Tajiks and Balochs. The Durrani Pashtuns, Nomads (Ghilji Pashtuns) and many other villagers are Pashtun tribes of the Noorzai, Barakzai, and Alizai. According to most recent estimates 80% of the Farah province are Pashtuns, 10% are Tajiks and 10% are Balochs.

Estimated ethnolinguistic and -religious composition
Ethnicity	Pashtun	Tajik/ Farsiwan	Baloch	Other	Sources
Period	Pashtun	Tajik/ Farsiwan	Baloch	Other	Sources

2004–2021 (Islamic Republic)	75 – >80%	10 – 14%	≤14%	∅
2021 DRC	majority	–	–	–
2020 EU	1st	–	–	–
2018 UN	75%	10%	∅	∅ (Note: incl. Ilat, Moghol, and Sadat.)
2015 CP	80%	∅	14%	∅ (Note: incl. Hazara and Aimaq.)
2015 NPS	80%	14%	–	∅ (Note: incl. a "small minority" of Hazara.)
2012 CSSF (Note: Demographic information is based on data from 2012.)	80%	∅	∅	∅ (Note: incl. Hazara.)
2011 USA	80%	14%	–	–
2009 ISW	>80%	–	–	–

Legend:
- ∅: Ethnicity mentioned in source but not quantified
- –: Ethnicity not mentioned specifically
- Source abbreviations: Empirical sources: –, Government sources: CP – Colombo Plan, EU – European Union Agency for Asylum, UN – United Nations Assistance Mission in Afghanistan, Editorial sources: CSSF – Center for the Scientific Study of Families, ISW – Institute for the Study of War, NPS – Naval Postgraduate School, USA – United States Army.

=== Education ===
The overall literacy rate (6+ years of age) fell from 28% in 2005 to 18% in 2011. The overall net enrollment rate (6–13 years of age) increased from 50% in 2005 to 68% in 2011.

=== Health ===
The percentage of households with clean drinking water increased from 3% in 2005 to 14% in 2011. 6% of births were attended to by a skilled birth attendant in 2011.

== Culture ==
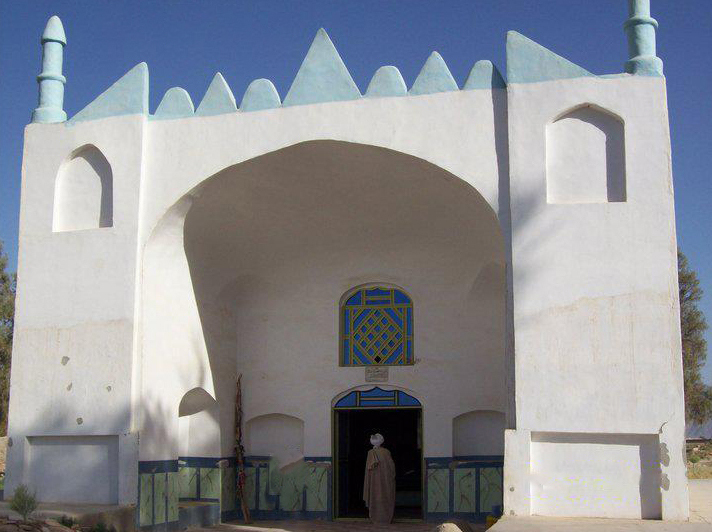
The tomb of Muhammad Jaunpuri

The tomb of Muhammad Jaunpuri is believed to be in Farah.
