= Kohsan District =

Kohsan کهسان
- District
- Location within Afghanistan
- Coordinates: 34°39′09″N 61°11′57″E
- Country: Afghanistan
- Province: Herat Province

Population (2012)
  - Total: 52,900

Kohsan (Pashto: کوهسان ولسوالۍ) is a district of Herat province in northwestern Afghanistan. It borders the nation of Iran to the west, Gulran District to the north, and Ghurian District to the south and east. The population of Kosan District is 52,900 (as of 2012), which includes the following ethnic groups: 59.4% Pashtun, 35.3% Tajik, 5.1% Balouch, and 0.2% Turkmen.

The administrative center of Kohsan District is the small town of Kohsan. The district is located about 116 kilometres (3 hours drive) west of Herat city and is mainly a desert, with patches of irrigated lands. Islam Qala, one of the official border crossings between Afghanistan and Iran, is located in this district. The Hari River flows through Kohsan District and is also not far from the district center. The drought is a serious problem for the agriculture, which is the main source of income. Almost 60% of the formerly arable land is not in use. The health services and the education have improved since 2002.

== Gallery ==
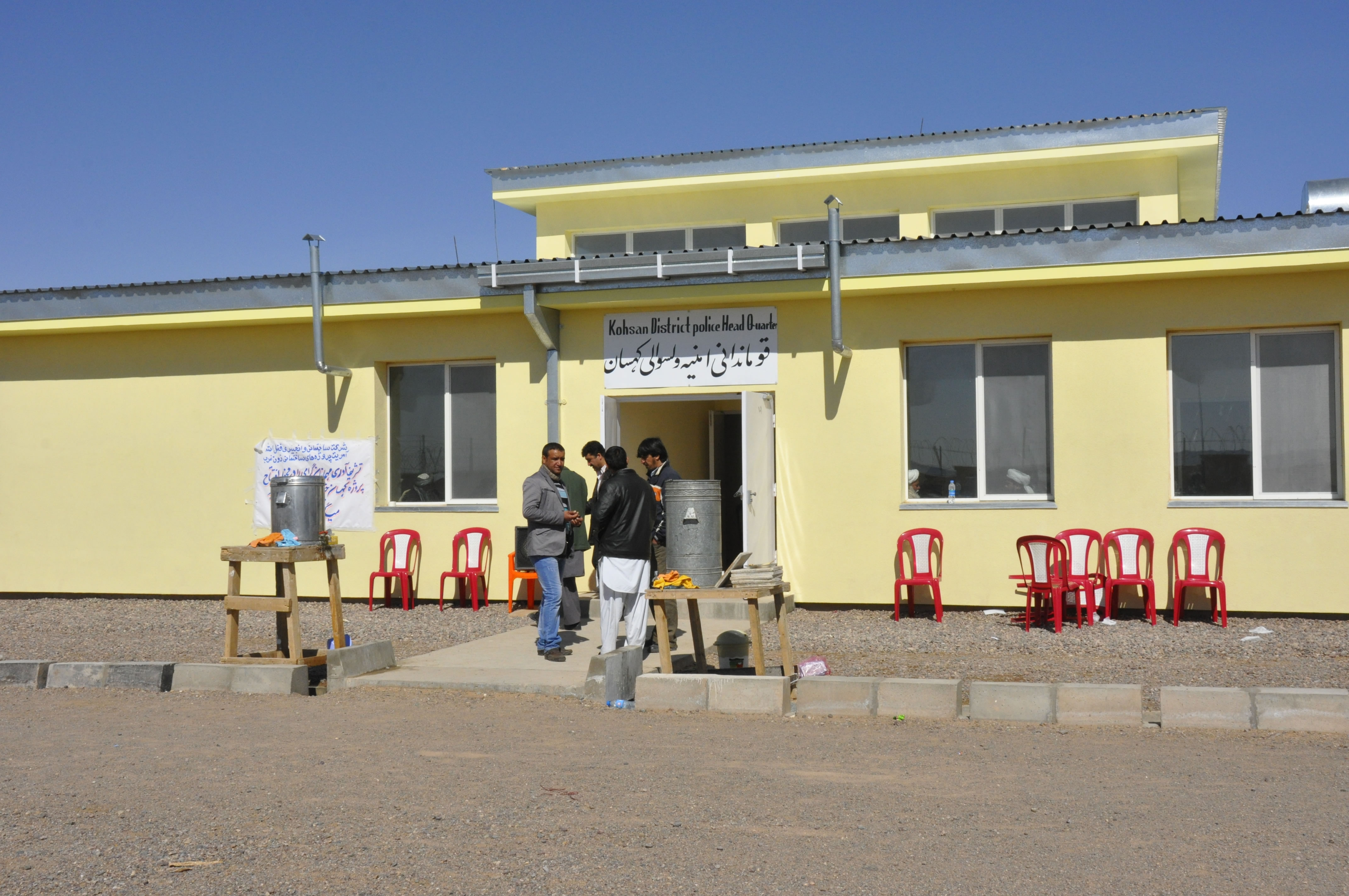
Afghan National Police (ANP) district headquarters at Kohsan.

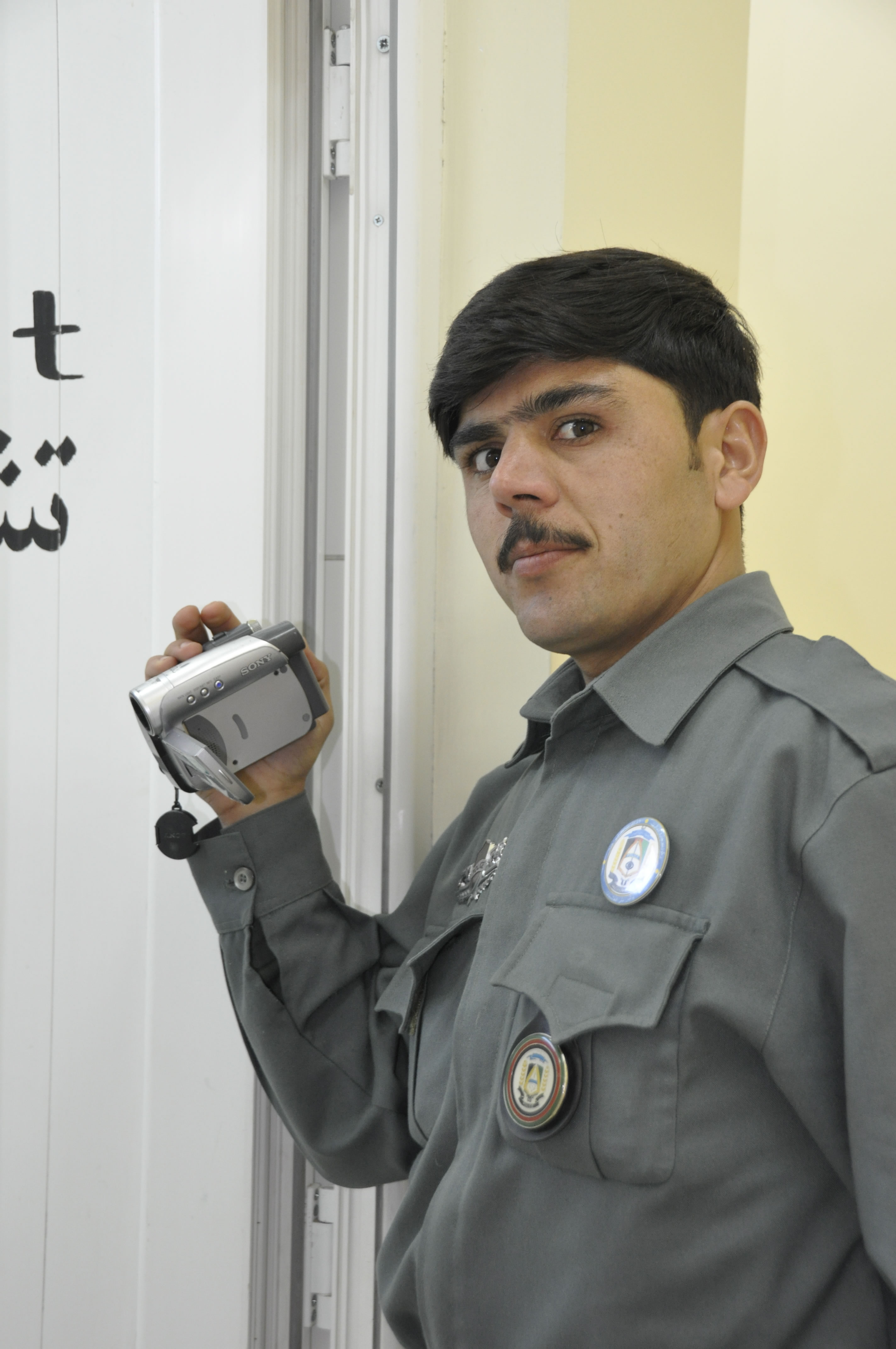
A Pashtun member of the ANP at Kohsan.

== See also ==
- Districts of Afghanistan
