= Zendeh Jan =

Zendehjan زنده جان
- Motto: The ancient city with more than 3000 years history.
- Location in Afghanistan
- Coordinates: 34°20′44″N 61°43′12″E
- Country: Afghanistan
- Province: Herat Province
- District: Zendeh Jan District
- Elevation: 835 m (2,740 ft)
- Time zone: UTC+4:30

Zinda Jan (Zindehjan, Pushang, Fushanj) (Persian: زنده جان; Persian: پوشنگ Pushang) is a town in the valley of the Hari River in the central part of Herat Province, Afghanistan at 34.3456°N 61.7317°E at 835 m altitude. It is 14 km east of Baranabad, and is the administrative seat of Zendeh Jan District. The population is 10,418 (est. 2007). Overlooking the town is the Seyyed Mohammad Khan fort (built after 1863) about 2 km to the southeast.

Pushang (later Arabicized as Fushanj) is the old name of this area, but now it is known as Zendejan (the only survival). There are many stories about this name, but the most famous one relates to the time when Mongol horde of Genghis Khan attacked the city, and only one person was left alive. As the result, people called this area Zendejan, which means the only survival.

Zendejan has about 70,000 people, including 157 villages. There are 22 schools in the district, including three female and four male high schools with a total of 17,000 students which 7,000 students are girls. All the people in this district speak Persian.

Most of the people in this district are farmers. Wheat and grain are grown, as well as fruits such as apples, pear, grapes, figs, peanuts, berries. Recently more farmers have grown saffron. The silk industry is also important.

== See also ==
- Herat Province
