= Transit Trade Agreement =

Transit Trade Agreement may refer to:

- Afghanistan–Pakistan Transit Trade Agreement, transit trade agreement between afghanistan and pakistan
- Quadrilateral Traffic in Transit Agreement, quadrilateral traffic in transit agreement is a transit trade deal between China, Pakistan, Kyrgyzstan and Kazakhstan
- Convention on Transit Trade of Land-locked States, is a multilateral treaty that addresses international rules
