= Afghanistan–Uzbekistan border =

International border

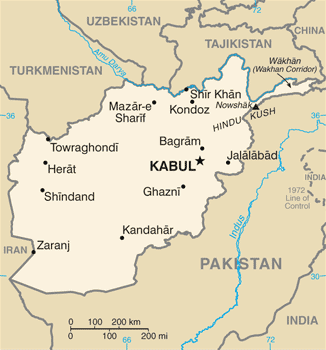
Map of Afghanistan with Uzbekistan to the north

Afghan and Uzbek boundary markers

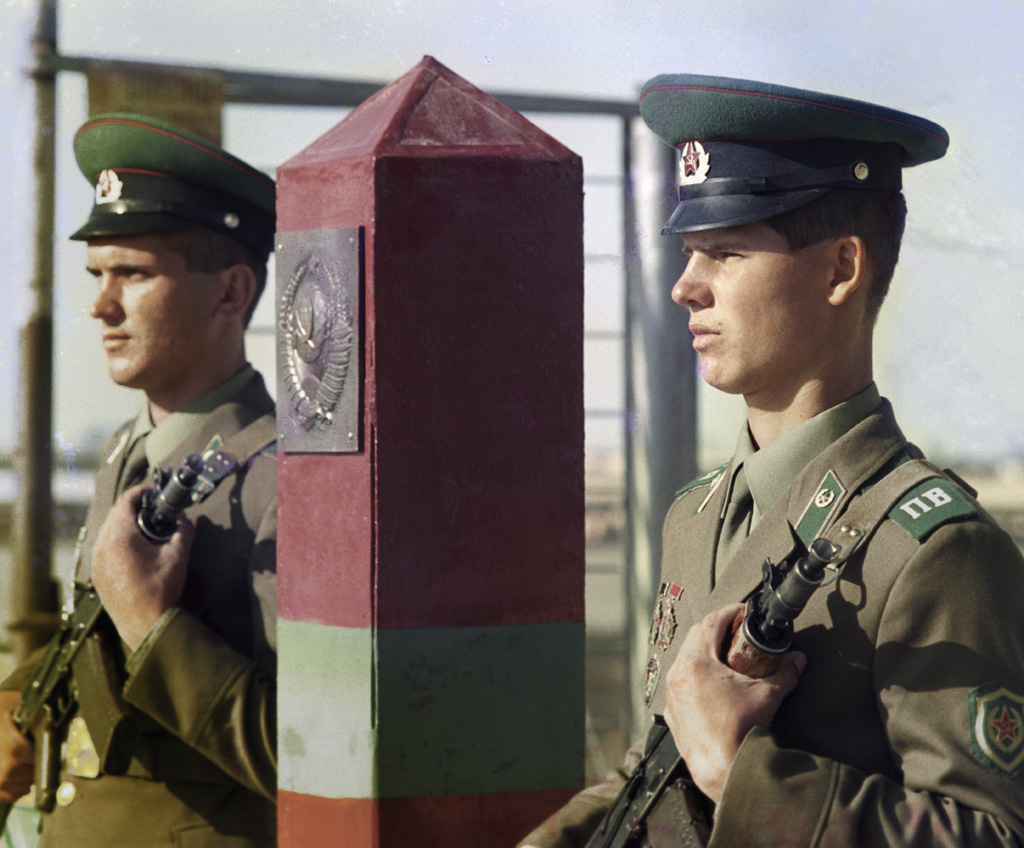
Soviet Border troops at the Soviet Afghan border (present day Afghanistan Uzbekistan border)

The Afghanistan–Uzbekistan border is 144 km (89 mi) in length and runs from the tripoint with Turkmenistan to the tripoint with Tajikistan along the Amu River. It is the shortest of Uzbekistan's external borders. The city of Termez in Uzbekistan and the town of Hairatan in Afghanistan are the closest major populated centers to the border.

Large volumes of trade between Afghanistan and Uzbekistan pass through the border on daily basis. Citizens of Afghanistan could stay for up to 10 days in Termez without a travel visa.

== Description ==
The entire border follows the thalweg of the Amu River, from the Turkmen tripoint in the west to the Tajik tripoint in the east. The border is paralleled on the Uzbek side by a road and railway line, and there is a major crossing point between Termez in Uzbekistan and Hairatan in Afghanistan.

It was reported in 2001 that Uzbekistan had built a barrier along the border, consisting of a barbed wire fence and a second, taller, 380-volt electrified barbed-wire fence, land mines and a patrol of heavily armed Uzbek soldiers.

== History ==
The border was inherited from the old Soviet Union–Afghan border, which largely took its current shape during the 19th-century Anglo-Russian rivalry in Central Asia known as the Great Game. With the Russian Empire having conquered the Khanate of Khiva and the Emirate of Bukhara, and with the British Empire controlling British India, the two powers were compelled to leave Afghanistan as an independent buffer state between them.

In 1873, Britain and Russia agreed on a rough formulation of the border, with the Amu River declared to be the border going east from the vicinity of the village of Khwaja Salar to Lake Zorku, with the Wakhan Corridor to remain in Afghanistan. The western section of the border (i.e. the bulk of the modern Afghan–Turkmen boundary) was to be determined at a later date by a boundary commission.

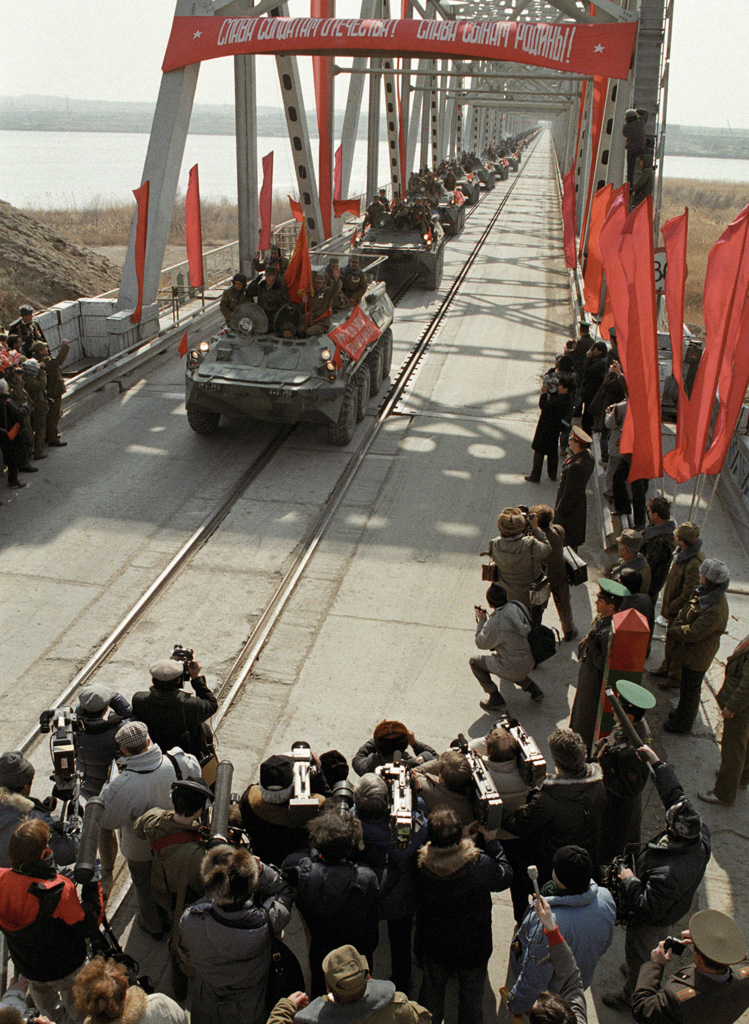
Soviet forces withdraw across the Amu River, 1989

Tensions mounted as the Russians expanded further into what is now Turkmenistan in the early 1880s, reaching a crisis with the Panjdeh incident (near Sandykachi in what is now Turkmenistan), an area claimed by Afghanistan. Discussions calmed the situation and a joint Anglo-Russian boundary commission demarcated the boundary as it is today over the period 1885–88. As the village of Khwaja Salar could no longer be identified it was agreed that the boundary should meet the Amu River in the vicinity of Khamiab, Afghanistan.

The easternmost section of the border (now forming part of the Afghan–Tajik boundary) was not finally delimited until 1893–95, with Emir Abdur Rahman Khan of Afghanistan agreeing to waive any claims to lands north the Amu River. This agreement also stipulated the position of the land border in section east of Lake Zorkul up to China, with a series of boundary pillars subsequently erected.

In 1921, a Soviet–Afghan treaty was signed whereby Russia agreed "to hand over to Afghanistan the frontier districts which belonged to the latter in the last century, observing the principles of justice and self-determination of the population inhabiting the same". However, this treaty was never implemented and was explicitly annulled by the Frontier Agreement of 1946, which kept the boundary as it was, with riverine islands to be subsequently allocated by a joint commission.

In 1979, Soviet troops of the 40th Army crossed the border at Termez via a series of pontoons as part of the Soviet invasion of Afghanistan, en route to Mazar-i-Sharif and Kabul. They later constructed the Friendship Bridge, which officially opened in 1982, however its strategic importance led to it being a target of the Mujahideen insurgency. The Soviet army left Afghanistan via the bridge in 1989.

The bridge was closed from 1997 to 2001 due to Uzbek fears of Taliban invasion, before re-opening to allow aid in following their fall in 2001. It remains the only fixed crossing between Uzbekistan and Afghanistan. When Balkh province fell to the Taliban in mid-2021, a number of Afghan military personnel and civilians crossed the border into Uzbekistan. In 2022, the Termez International Trade Center opened, which allows Afghan citizens to stay in Termez for up to 10 days without a travel visa.

== Border crossings ==
- Hairatan (AFG)-Termez (UZB) (rail and road, see Afghanistan–Uzbekistan Friendship Bridge)

== Settlements near the border ==
=== Afghanistan ===
- Dali
- Kaldar
- Hairatan

=== Uzbekistan ===
- Termez

== See also ==
- Afghanistan–Uzbekistan relations
