= Vehicle registration plates of Kazakhstan =

Republic of Kazakhstan
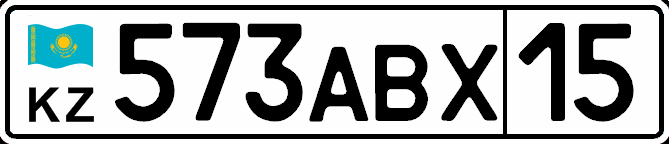
- Kazakh plate for private vehicle
- Country: Kazakhstan
- Country code: KZ

Current series
- Size: 520 mm × 110 mm 20.5 in × 4.3 in
- Serial format: 689 BAK 45 (45 being the regional code)
- Colour (front): Black on white
- Colour (rear): Black on white

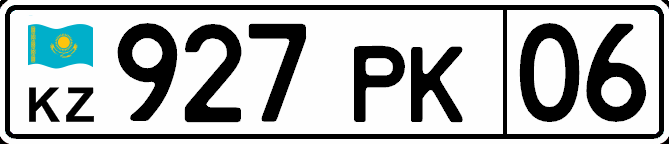
Plate for non-private vehicles

The current format of vehicle registration plates of Kazakhstan uses black letters on a white background with a Kazakh flag and the country code KZ on the left. The two digit area code is located on the square located on the right and the rest of the plate follows the format 111AAA. This format was introduced in 2011 and was implemented from August 2012.

== Design until August 2012 ==
Vehicle registration plate of Kazakhstan for Almaty

Plate for non-private vehicles

This format of vehicle registration plates of Kazakhstan used black letters on a white background. Each registration plate consisted of a single letter identifying the area and three digits and two letters identifying the non-individual car (for example: A 644 DC) or of a single letter identifying the area and three digits and three letters identifying the individual car (for example: A 643 KCG)

Special registration plates also exist. Cars registered to non-Kazakh individuals and organizations have registration plates with black letters on a yellow background. Diplomatic vehicles use registration plates with white letters on a red background.

=== Regional codes ===
New Area Code	Old Area Code	City/Area
01	Z	Astana
02	A	Almaty
03	C, O, W	Akmola Region
04	D	Aktobe Region
05	B, V	Almaty Region
06	E	Atyrau Region
07	L	West Kazakhstan Region
08	H	Zhambyl Region
09	K, M	Karagandy Region; until 1997 Jezkazgan Province
10	P, W	Kostanay Region
11	N	Kyzylorda Region
12	R	Mangystau Region
13	X	Turkestan Region
14	S	Pavlodar Region
15	O, T	North Kazakhstan Region
16	F, U	East Kazakhstan Region
17	-	Shymkent
18	-	Abai Region
19	-	Jetisu Region
20	-	Ulytau Region

=== Codes on government plates ===
Code	Organisation
01	President
02	Prime Minister
03	Mazhilis
04	Senate
05	Secretary of State
AV, AST	Government and administration, senators
SK	Presidential Security ("Security Kazakhstan")
NS	National security
АС (AW*, KP*)	Ministry of Internal Affairs
SP*	Tax Police (Salyk policijasy)
ТC*	Custom Committee
VP*	Almaty municipal car
PK*	General Prosecutor
АА	Akym (Head of the region)
1	Akym (Head of the region)
2-120	Akym of the city (and their office)

=== Codes on diplomatic plates ===
Code	Country or organisation
001	United States
002	Iran
003	China
004	Turkey
005	Germany
006	Pakistan
007	Israel
008	India
009	Canada
010	North Korea
011	France
012	Mongolia
013	Italy
014	Cuba
015	Hungary
016	Libya
017	Romania
018	United Kingdom
019	Russia
020	Armenia
021	Japan
022	Switzerland
023	Uzbekistan
024	Palestine
025	South Korea
026	Egypt
027	Czech Republic
028	Lithuania
029	Georgia
031	Tajikistan
032	Poland
033	Bulgaria
034	Ukraine
035	Afghanistan
036	Central Asia Regional Economic Cooperation Program
037	UNICEF
038	Lebanon
039	Kyrgyzstan
040	European Union
041	Vatican City
042	Netherlands
043	Croatia
044	Australia
045	United Nations High Commissioner for Refugees
046	UNESCO
047	MIR
048	International Fund for Saving the Aral Sea
049	Malaysia
050	Greece
051	Belgium
052	Saudi Arabia
053	Islamic Development Bank
054	Belarus
055	Asian Development Bank
056	International Organization for Migration
057	Eurasian Economic Community
058	OSCE
059	Thailand
060	Latvia
061	Turkmenistan
062	Spain
063	United Nations Office on Drugs and Crime
064	Red Cross
065	United Nations
067	Sweden
068	Austria
069	Yemen
070	Sovereign Military Order of Malta
071	South Africa
072	Norway
073	Azerbaijan
074	Slovakia
075	Denmark
076	Finland
078	International Finance Corporation
079	United Arab Emirates
080	Conference on Interaction and Confidence-Building Measures in Asia
081	Eurasian Development Bank
082	Brazil
083	Central Asia Regional AIDS Project Management Team
084	Oman
085	Jordan
086	World Health Organization
087	Vietnam
088	Qatar
089	Iraq
097	United Nations Development Program
100	Ministry of Foreign Affairs

=== Codes on Soviet era plates ===
Suffix	City/Province
АК	Akmola Province
ЦЛ	Akmola Province
АП	Alma-Ata Province
АТ	Alma-Ata
АЮ	Aktobe Province
ВА	East Kazakhstan Province
ВК	East Kazakhstan Province
ГУ	Atyrau Province
ГТ	Atyrau Province
ДЖ	Jambyl Province
ДК	Jezkazgan Province
ЗК	West Kazakhstan Province
КЗ	Kyzylorda Province
КТ	Kokshetau Province
КЩ	Kostanay Province
МШ	Mangystau Province
НЖ	Kostanay Province
ПА	Pavlodar Province
СК	North Kazakhstan Province
СП	Semipalatinsk Province
ТГ	Torgay Province
ТК	Taldykorgan Province
УТ	West Kazakhstan Province
ЧМ	South Kazakhstan Province
ША	Atyrau Province
ЮК	South Kazakhstan Province
