= Volkart =

Volkart may refer to:

- Volkart Brothers, former Swiss merchant company
- Volkart (surname)
