= Transit trade =

International trade involving an intermediary or passage through third countries

Transit trade refers to a form of international trade in which goods pass through a country other than the country of origin or final destination. Often, the entity handling the goods—known as a transitor—is based in a third country that is not part of the import or export transaction. The goods may transit physically through this third country or be traded via companies based there, without entering the local economy.

In direct transit trade, the goods never enter the transitor's country, whereas in indirect transit trade, they may pass through it but remain under customs control without being cleared. They are often stored temporarily in bonded warehouses or free ports, where they may be reconditioned or relabeled before further shipment.

Unlike re-exports, which involve a change of ownership within the country of re-export, transit trade typically involves goods that remain under the ownership of an entity based outside the transiting country. This distinction is reflected in trade statistics: when no change of ownership occurs, such transactions are often excluded from import/export data under the concept of "transit without economic impact." In contrast, goods entering or exiting a customs union (such as the European Union) may be counted under the concept of border crossing.

Transit trade plays a strategic role in global commerce by connecting producers and consumers across borders. It is particularly important in countries that offer favorable conditions for transit-related services, such as stable financial systems, low taxes, efficient logistics infrastructure, and legal expertise. For these countries, transit trade represents a form of export of services, even when the traded goods never enter the domestic consumer market.

== Legal and policy frameworks ==
Transit trade is governed by international agreements that guarantee the freedom of transit, especially through the territory of third countries. Notable instruments include:

- GATT Article V, which guarantees non-discriminatory transit
- the Convention on Transit Trade of Land-locked States (1965), securing access to sea routes for landlocked countries
- the Afghanistan–Pakistan Transit Trade Agreement (1965, 2010), facilitating cross-border movement between the two countries
- the Quadrilateral Traffic in Transit Agreement, a multilateral corridor framework among Central and South Asian states

== By region ==
=== Switzerland ===
Since the second half of the 19th century, Switzerland has emerged as one of the world's major hubs for transit trade, primarily focused on raw materials and commodities. Swiss transit trade is predominantly direct, meaning that financial flows pass through Swiss territory while the goods themselves do not physically transit through the country. The country's role as a transit trading center was established through historical privileges dating back to the Perpetual Peace with France in 1516, which exempted Swiss merchants from customs duties, and later developed through the establishment of major trading houses such as Gebrüder Volkart, Basler Handelsgesellschaft, and numerous others during the 19th century industrialization period.

Modern Swiss transit trade experienced significant expansion from the 1950s onward, when favorable tax conditions and Swiss neutrality attracted major international commodity trading companies. American multinationals such as Cargill (establishing Tradax in Geneva in 1956) and Philipp Brothers (relocating to Zug in 1956) were followed by later entrants including Vitol, Glencore, and Gunvor. By the early 2020s, an estimated one-fifth to one-quarter of global raw materials trading was conducted through Swiss-based companies, with the sector generating revenues of 40-60 billion Swiss francs annually and representing approximately 6-8% of Switzerland's GDP. The sector's importance to the Swiss economy surpassed both tourism (in 2006) and international banking services (in 2009), though it remains largely unregulated compared to other financial sectors.
