= Transit trade in Switzerland =

International intermediary trade conducted through Switzerland

Transit trade in Switzerland refers to international intermediary commerce where Swiss-based companies facilitate trade between countries without the goods necessarily passing through Swiss territory. In this form of trade, the "transit trader" does not reside in either the exporting or importing country, but operates from Switzerland as a third country.

Since the second half of the 19th century, Switzerland has emerged as one of the world's major hubs for transit trade, primarily focused on raw materials and commodities. By the early 2020s, an estimated one-fifth to one-quarter of global raw materials trading was conducted through Swiss companies.

== History ==
=== Early modern period ===
During the early modern period, Switzerland was already heavily involved in cross-border trade. The Confederate cantons imported cereals and salt while exporting cheese and livestock. The import of raw materials and export of textiles (silk, cotton) and watches, produced in the proto-industrial context, were the main drivers of Switzerland's participation in international commerce.

The export of services also developed early, with military entrepreneurs providing mercenary contingents to foreign leaders, while wealthy entrepreneurs, private bankers, and cantonal governments (notably in Bern, Fribourg, Solothurn, Zurich, and Schaffhausen) collected interest on capital invested abroad.

Following the Perpetual Peace concluded with France in 1516, Confederate merchants were not subject to new customs taxes, a clause they interpreted until the end of the Ancien Régime as complete exemption from customs duties and taxes. Like Swiss mercenaries, merchants were also exempt from the droit d'aubaine, which allowed the French king to confiscate the property of foreigners who died on his territory. With these privileges, Swiss merchants of the early modern period used France as a springboard to trade with Spain and its colonial empire.

The transatlantic or triangular trade, widespread from the late 17th century, prefigured transit trade in many respects. Like European merchants, many Swiss merchants and financiers participated in this type of commerce by founding subsidiaries in French port cities during the 17th and 18th centuries, investing with others in the equipment of slave ships, or outfitting their own vessels. Christoph Burckhardt, son of the Basel merchant of the same name, notably founded the company Bourcard Fils & Cie in the port of Nantes, which traded in cotton, coffee, and other colonial products.

=== 19th century expansion ===
Industrialization and globalization of markets intensified from the mid-19th century. New means of transport (railways, steamships), new technologies (telegraph), the emergence of commercial banks, and the growing acceptance of the gold standard generated large-scale transfers of goods from distant countries to industrialized nations for the first time. Trading companies also reduced their risks by offsetting transactions concluded on the spot market with operations on the futures market.

During this period, many Swiss companies extended their activities from Europe to overseas markets or were newly founded to participate in global trade. These included trading houses such as Simonius, Vischer & Co. (active in Basel in the wool trade, first mentioned in 1719 under the name Fürstenberger), Basler Handelsgesellschaft (founded in 1859 as Missions-Handlungs-Gesellschaft), Gebrüder Volkart (founded in 1851 in Winterthur), Paul Reinhart & Cie (founded in 1788 in Winterthur as Geilinger & Blum), the Lausanne-based grain trading house André (founded in 1877 in Nyon), and Sulzer Frizzoni (active in silk trade, founded in 1889, renamed Charles Rudolph & Co. in 1928, then Desco von Schulthess in 1950).

Companies Diethelm & Co. (founded in 1887), Ed. A. Keller (also founded in 1887), and Siber Hegner (founded in 1865 as Siber & Brennwald), all specialized in Asian markets and now grouped under the DKSH holding company, also participated in this type of trade.

These global trading companies no longer relied on the slavery economy but focused on cash crops - agricultural products destined for the global market. They typically concentrated on specific world regions and products such as cotton, cereals, cocoa, and silk. Unlike 18th-century commercial dynasties, they did not exclusively source from intermediaries in major port cities but developed their own network of subsidiaries, including inland offices to purchase products and sales agencies in distribution countries.

=== Wars and capital controls ===
From 1880 to World War I, global trade intensified, and with it, transit trade in Switzerland. During the war, most companies made solid profits as price increases echoed the scarcity of supply due to the conflict. Thanks to their flexibility, transit trading companies could offset losses in one part of the world with profits in another; it was only then that many companies became truly global players.

Swiss transit trading companies first encountered major problems in the 1930s after the introduction of capital controls. In autumn 1931, Switzerland concluded clearing agreements with Austria, then shortly after with Hungary. Exporters' claims and importers' debts were now added together so that foreign exchange transfers became obsolete. From 1934, regulated payment services were used for trade with Nazi Germany, the main partner of Swiss transit traders.

In October 1934, they founded the Syndicate of Swiss Global Trading and Transit Trading Houses, which had 71 affiliated companies in 1935, representing 90% of transit trading companies based in Switzerland. According to the confidential survey conducted for transit traders by economic historian Fritz Mangold and published in 1935, Swiss transit trade generated an annual gross turnover of 1.3 to 1.4 billion Swiss francs between 1923 and 1928, with annual net profits of about 40 million francs.

=== Post-war liberalization ===
After World War II, Swiss transit trading companies, which made their profits abroad, benefited from new international organizations without necessarily respecting their embargoes. Skeptical of multilateralism, Switzerland did not join the United Nations or the Bretton Woods system and only signed the General Agreement on Tariffs and Trade (GATT) in 1958.

The availability and convertibility of currencies were of great importance to transit trading companies. From 1946, transit traders could sell to the Swiss National Bank the dollars they had acquired from Swiss banks to procure goods. The Bank of England authorized American and Swiss banks to maintain registered accounts from 1940. Deposits in pound sterling in such accounts could not only be used for imports from the sterling area but also be converted into dollars or Swiss francs.

From the 1950s, financial transactions were facilitated in Western Europe by the European Payments Union, founded by European countries within the framework of the Marshall Plan and to which Switzerland had adhered. When the Organisation for European Economic Co-operation (OEEC) sought to liberalize services in "invisible" operations, high-ranking Swiss diplomats worked to create a "Profits from transit operations" category in the organization's code.

=== Modern expansion ===
In the 1950s, business lawyers and Swiss associations began intense lobbying work; the bourgeois elite had realized that the establishment of foreign companies in Switzerland generated tax revenues at federal and cantonal levels and created new opportunities in notarial services, private banking, management control, consulting, and tax advice.

Many American holdings active in the raw materials sector now established themselves in Switzerland, where they benefited from individually negotiated tax advantages. Philipp Brothers, then the world's largest ore and metal trading company, established itself in Zug in 1956, taking advantage of favorable taxation. The same year, Cargill, a powerful American grain trader, opened a subsidiary in Geneva under the name Tradax. Between 1959 and 1961, about 400 American multinationals established themselves in Switzerland, nearly half in the Lake Geneva region, to engage in transit trade.

The Vitol group (founded in 1966), Glencore (founded in 1974 as Marc Rich + Co. SA by Marc Rich, a former Philipp Brothers trader), and Gunvor (founded in 1997 by Swedish entrepreneur Torbjörn Törnqvist and Russian oligarch Gennady Timchenko) later established themselves in Switzerland.

== Economic significance ==
Transit trade has become increasingly important to the Swiss economy. While the Swiss National Bank has maintained a balance of payments since 1947 to evaluate service export revenues, transit trade remains a difficult economic sector to apprehend. In 1953, the Association of Transit and Global Trading Firms commissioned a new study from Emil Gsell, professor at the University of St. Gallen. Gsell estimated global transit trade turnover at about 5 billion francs, roughly the same amount as the entire export industry.

From 2002, the raw materials trading sector experienced exponential growth, mainly due to the collapse of the Eastern Bloc. In 2017, the sector generated 25 billion francs in revenue according to federal data, while Swiss National Bank figures reached 40 billion francs. The growing importance of transit trade is reflected in its share of GDP. In 2006, it surpassed tourism for the first time, and in 2009, it exceeded international banking services. Since then, total transit trade revenues have more than doubled.

The 2013 Basic Report on Raw Materials, published by several federal departments, highlighted the great importance of raw materials trade for the national economy. However, it also mentioned problems related to this type of trade, concerning human rights and environmental situations, the fight against corruption, and the phenomenon of the "resource curse" in developing countries.

== See also ==
- Swiss maritime trade

== Bibliography ==
- Mangold, Fritz: Der schweizerische Transithandel. Ergebnis einer Enquête, 1935.
- Iselin, Isaak; Lüthy, Herbert; Schiess, Walter Sebastian: Der schweizerische Grosshandel in Geschichte und Gegenwart, 1943.
- Bammatter, Emil Michael: Der schweizerische Transithandel. Eine Darstellung seiner Struktur und ein Überblick seiner Entwicklung in den Jahren 1934-1954, 1958.
- Lichtenberg, Robert M.: The Role of Middleman Transactions in World Trade, 1959.
- Guex, Sébastien: "The development of swiss trading companies in the twentieth century", in: Jones, Geoffrey (ed.): The Multinational Traders, 1998, pp. 150–172.
- Franc, Andrea: Wie die Schweiz zur Schokolade kam. Der Kakaohandel der Basler Handelsgesellschaft mit der Kolonie Goldküste (1893-1960), 2008.
- Déclaration de Berne (ed.): Swiss Trading SA. La Suisse, le négoce et la malédiction des matières premières, 2011.
- Zangger, Andreas: Koloniale Schweiz. Ein Stück Globalgeschichte zwischen Europa und Südostasien (1860-1930), 2011.
- Dejung, Christof: Die Fäden des globalen Marktes. Eine Sozial- und Kulturgeschichte des Welthandels am Beispiel der Handelsfirma Gebrüder Volkart 1851-1999, 2013.
- Département fédéral des affaires étrangères; Département fédéral des finances; Département fédéral de l'économie, de la formation et de la recherche (ed.): Rapport de base: matières premières. Rapport de la plateforme interdépartementale matières premières à l'attention du Conseil fédéral, 2013.
- Leimgruber, Matthieu: "'Kansas City on Lake Geneva'. Business hubs, tax evasion, and international connections around 1960", in: Zeitschrift für Unternehmensgeschichte, 60/2, 2015, pp. 123–140.
- Haller, Lea: Transithandel. Geld und Warenströme im globalen Kapitalismus, 2019.
