= Volkart (surname) =

Volkart is a surname. Notable people with the surname include:

- Alliana Volkart (born 2000), Argentine sport shooter
- Hazel Volkart, American composer, music educator, and pianist
- Johann Georg Volkart, Swiss merchant and entrepreneur in overseas trade
- Salomon Volkart (1816–1893), Swiss merchant and radical politician
- Silvia Regina Volkart (1925–2015), German non-fiction writer and psychotherapist
