= Hairatan =

Hairatan حیرتان
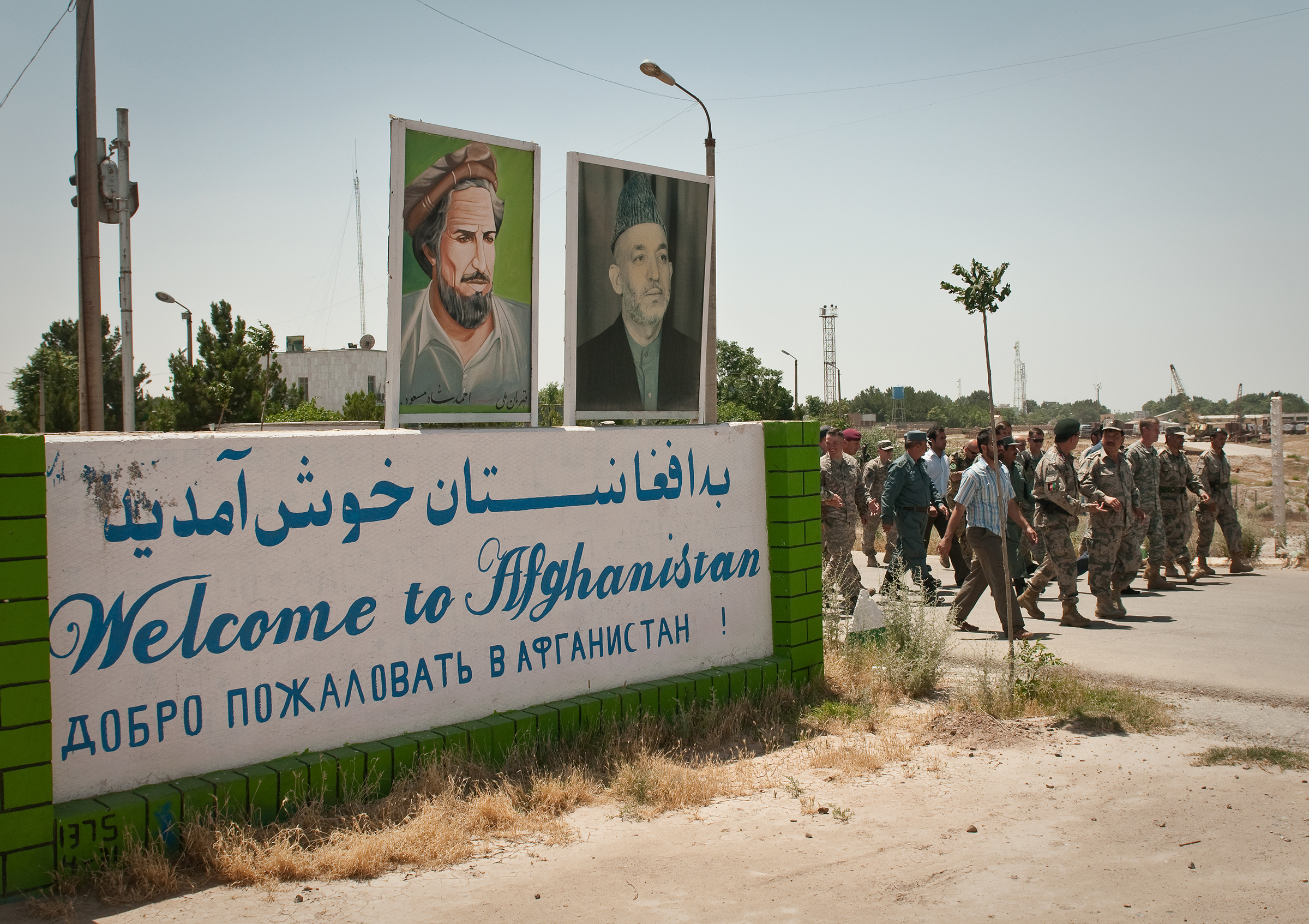
- The Welcome to Afghanistan sign at the Hairatan port in 2010

- Location in Afghanistan
- Coordinates: 37°13′1″N 67°25′01″E
- Country: Afghanistan
- Province: Balkh Province
- District: Kaldar District
- Elevation: 980 ft (300 m)
- Time zone: UTC+04:30 (Afghanistan Time)

Hairatan (Dari and Pashto: حیرتان; Uzbek and Tajik: Ҳайратон) is a port city along the Amu Darya in northern Balkh Province of Afghanistan. It serves as the capital of Kaldar District and is about 75 km (47 mi) north of Mazar-i-Sharif. The port and border checkpoint are located in the eastern section of the city. The Amu River forms the border with neighboring Uzbekistan, and the two nations are connected by the Afghanistan–Uzbekistan Friendship Bridge. The city of Termez in Uzbekistan is a short distance away to the northwest of Hairatan, on the other side of the Amu River.

Hairatan is one of the major transporting, shipping and receiving locations in Afghanistan. It is also an official border crossing between the people of Afghanistan and Uzbekistan. Security in and around the town is provided by the Afghan National Police. Foreign travelers must possess a valid travel visa to enter Afghanistan. Citizens of Afghanistan could stay visa-free for up to 2 weeks in the Airitom Free Zone of Termez.

== History ==
The region around Amu River has been important in the history of civilizations from the Bactria–Margiana Archaeological Complex, and the area around Hairatan was important during early Indo-Iranian migration by the Andronovo culture. In the early 1990s, Hairatan was the location of the 70th Division of General Abdul Momen, who was loosely aligned with Abdul Rashid Dostum's National Islamic Movement of Afghanistan. After Momen's 1994 death by an RPG missile attack, the 70th Division split and Dostum loyalist Colonel General Helaluddin took command.

During the presidency of Hamid Karzai, the town became an important strategic location for Afghanistan. The Afghan National Police and the Afghan Border Police established bases to provide security and maintain border activities. They are backed by the Afghan Armed Forces.

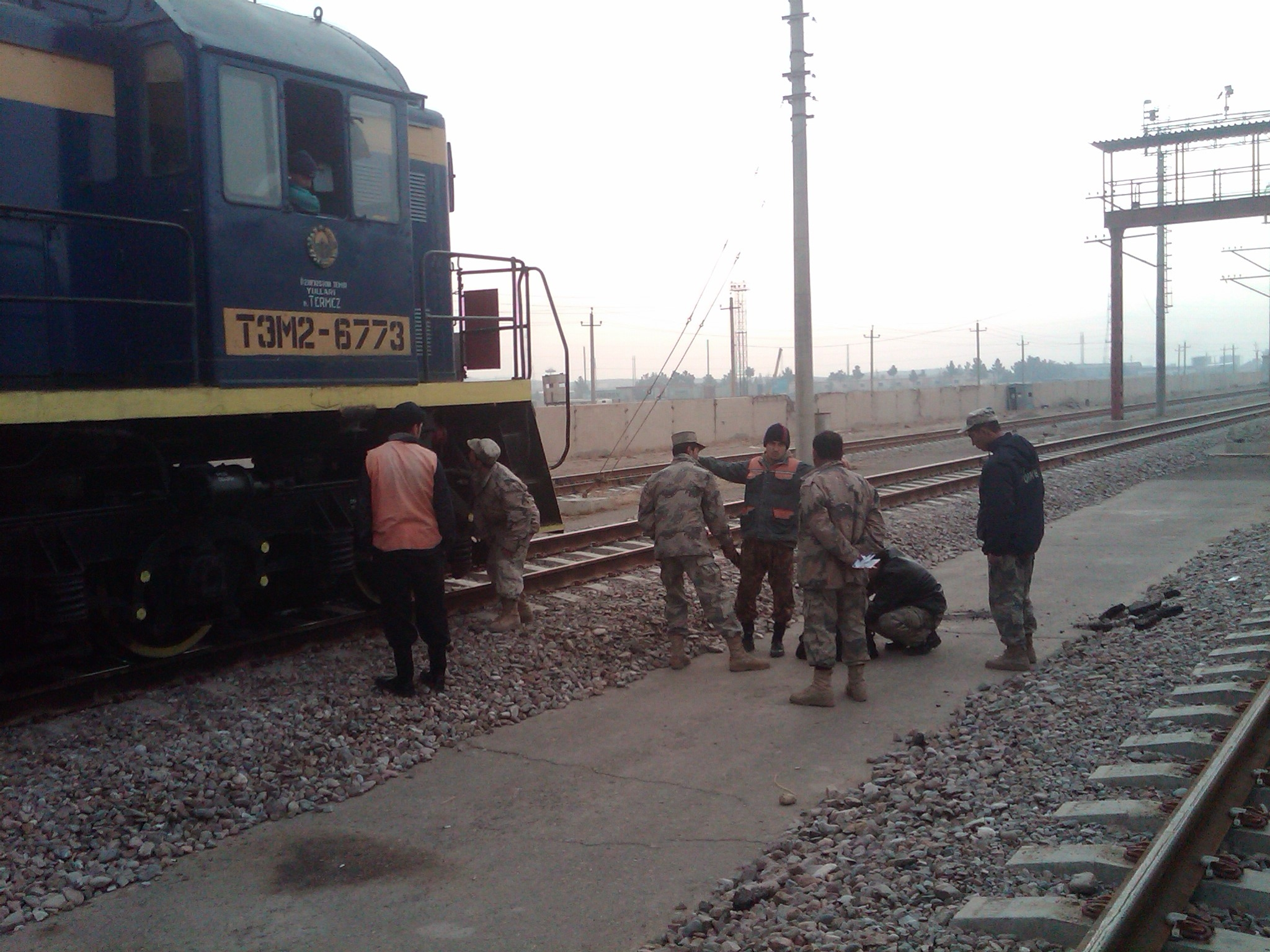
Members of the Afghan Border Police search a locomotive near the Hairatan border crossing point.

A freight terminal in Hairatan is the terminus of one of three rail lines in Afghanistan - a 10 km (6 mile) link to Termez. In January 2010, the construction was started of a 75 km (47 mi) rail link from Hairatan to a terminal at Gur-e Mar near the city of Mazar-i-Sharif. The project, part of the transport strategy and action plan of the Central Asia Regional Economic Cooperation Program, was contractually scheduled for completion by June 2011, but was complete ahead of schedule, in November 2010.

In May 2010, then-U.S. Ambassador Karl Eikenberry, the president of the Asian Development Bank (ADB), several the Afghan ministers, and fellow ambassadors from Japan, Finland, and Uzbekistan attended the ribbon-cutting ceremony inaugurating the Hairatan rail line. The United States and Japan became the two largest shareholders in ADB. This rail link became the first phase of a larger rail network planned to link Iran in the west and Tajikistan via a line at Sher Khan Bandar in neighboring Kunduz Province to the east. These future lines will create a rail corridor through northern Afghanistan and enable freight coming from Tajikistan and Uzbekistan to reach South Asian and Persian Gulf ports on rail.

In 2023, the Afghanistan Railway Authority (ARA) took control of the Hairatan-Mazar rail service. Meanwhile, the Airitom Free Zone opened in neighboring Termez, which allows Afghans and other foreigners to stay there for up to two weeks without a travel visa. Hundreds of thousands of local tourists visit Hairatan each year for business and other purposes. Trade between Afghanistan and Uzbekistan at Hairatan continues to increase.

== See also ==
- Rail transport in Afghanistan
- Afghanistan–Uzbekistan border
- Afghanistan–Uzbekistan relations
- Aqina (border crossing between Afghanistan and Turkmenistan)
- Sher Khan Bandar (border crossing between Afghanistan and Tajikistan)
- Tourism in Afghanistan
