= Swiss maritime trade =

Swiss maritime trade refers to the extensive involvement of Switzerland in international maritime commerce and shipping, despite the country being landlocked. Although Switzerland has no direct access to the sea and never established colonies, Swiss merchants have been successfully engaged in overseas trade since the early modern period. The country's early industrialization, favorable tax policies, international financial center status, and being spared from both world wars have made Switzerland a major hub for international commodity trading in the 21st century. Switzerland is connected to the sea through the Rhine and Swiss ports along the Rhine.

Today, Switzerland ranks ninth globally and fourth in Europe in terms of gross tonnage among countries where shipping companies are based. The Swiss shipping sector comprises an estimated 60 companies operating about 900 ships. The most well-known is MSC based in Geneva, which is the world's largest container shipping company. Including ships owned by commodity trading companies based in Switzerland, there are an estimated 2,600 ships operating out of Switzerland.

== Historical development ==
=== Early modern expansion ===
In the 18th century, the high quality of textile production during proto-industrialization, early industrialization, and limited local markets pushed Swiss entrepreneurs to sell their goods on the global market. Swiss merchants participated in maritime trade from the late 17th century in port cities such as Bordeaux, Naples, Livorno, and Genoa. Unable to access the European market due to protectionist economic policies of many states (mercantilism), the textile industry and watchmaking began exporting their products overseas.

By 1845, 40 to 50% of Swiss exports were destined for North and South America, while 15 to 20% went to Asia and the Near East. To increase their exports, Swiss manufacturers maintained business relationships with trading houses in various port cities, often connecting with these establishments through compatriot merchants. Entrepreneurs depended on these relationships to quickly reduce production in case of distribution problems and to stay informed about fashionable colors and patterns in major markets.

The overseas activities of Swiss trading houses were often closely linked to the extension of colonial domination. The Basel Trading Company (managed until 1917 by the Basel Mission), active in the Gold Coast (Ghana), was part of a cartel of trading houses during the first half of the 20th century that prevented emerging African merchants from exporting cocoa to Europe. Swiss traders in the Levant, serving as consuls of major European powers from the late 19th century, benefited from the pressure these powers exerted on the Ottoman Empire.

Trading houses present in Asia, including Gebrüder Volkart (founded in 1851 in Winterthur and Bombay), Siber & Brennwald (founded in 1865 in Yokohama), and Diethelm & Co. (founded in 1887 in Singapore), were able to access vast markets whose opening was based on violence exercised by colonial powers (sub-imperialism).

Merchants from Basel, Neuchâtel, Geneva, Zurich, and Bern operated their own plantations or participated in triangular trade between Europe, Africa, and the Americas until the prohibition of slavery. In this type of trade, raw materials produced in the colonies were transported to Europe for processing. European consumer goods such as printed textiles (mainly calico, highly appreciated) and weapons then left western ports (Nantes, Bordeaux, Cádiz, Lisbon, etc.) for West Africa, where they were exchanged for sub-Saharan slaves who, in turn, crossed the Atlantic to be sold as labor to plantation owners.

=== 19th century concentration ===
From the mid-19th century, the construction of railway lines, development of the telegraph, and rise of industrial production revolutionized long-distance trade, previously handled by small or medium-sized establishments selling a wide range of products (jewelry, textiles, sugars, spices, cotton, etc.). Raw materials such as cotton, cereals, coffee, or cocoa were then imported to Europe by specialized entrepreneurs seeking to improve their efficiency to remain competitive (economies of scale).

The establishment of quality standards allowed producers to sell their goods to European factories using the telegraph. This standardization also enabled merchants to use futures contracts on international commodity exchanges to hedge against price fluctuations. To guarantee the quality of goods, many establishments opened agencies within exporting countries to buy raw materials in local markets or directly from planters. This vertical integration was made possible by the construction of railway lines that directly connected production areas to port cities, from where goods were shipped to industrialized countries.

Large companies had vast clientele not limited to their country of origin. Gebrüder Volkart, for example, one of Switzerland's most important trading houses in the 20th century, possessed more than 150 branches in 18 European countries in the 1920s, as well as subsidiaries in Osaka, Shanghai, Singapore, and New York.

Being highly capital-intensive due to the creation of agencies (buying and selling) and increased turnover, the commodity trade was controlled by the end of the 19th century by several major firms, notably Swiss ones, including André & Cie, the Basel Trading Company, Gebrüder Volkart, Geilinger & Blum, Paul Reinhart & Cie, Simonius, Vischer & Co., Diethelm & Co., Ed. A. Keller, and Siber & Brennwald. Like elsewhere, these multinationals practiced transit trade, meaning they bought goods at their production location to sell them directly to consumers without passing through Switzerland.

The increase in credit demands, linked to the growth of commercial exchange volume, led to the founding of numerous banking establishments in Switzerland. Several private Zurich banks, associated with silk trade, were thus created in the 1830s. The Bank of Winterthur, founded in 1862 and merged in 1912 with the Bank of Toggenburg to form the Union Bank of Switzerland (UBS), was primarily a credit bank for entrepreneurs who contributed to Winterthur's commercial and industrial development.

=== 20th and 21st century evolution ===
In the 20th century, companies active in maritime trade continued to play an important role, supplying raw materials to industrialized countries and serving as intermediaries for exports of major technical equipment. Their evolution varied according to their corporate philosophy as well as their commercial and geographical orientation.

Gebrüder Volkart concentrated from its beginnings on the raw materials market and became, in the 20th century, one of the world's leading cotton and coffee trading companies, before withdrawing from trading from the 1980s. Glencore, originating from the Marc Rich group, transitioned at the beginning of the 21st century from commodity trader status to mining group. The commercial company DKSH, resulting from a merger of Diethelm & Co., Ed. A. Keller, and Siber Hegner, abandoned trade at the end of the 20th century to become a service provider offering advice to Western firms active in East and Southeast Asia.

From the 1950s, more and more foreign companies established themselves in Switzerland, especially in Zug, Geneva, and Lugano, which became, thanks to tax advantages and proximity to financial centers, global commodity trading centers. Glencore, Cargill, Trafigura, Mercuria, Gunvor, and Vitol are among the main firms active in this sector. From 2000, the Swiss trading center experienced new growth: the sector's net revenues increased from two billion Swiss francs in 2002 to approximately 25 billion francs in 2017. With a market share sometimes exceeding 50%, Switzerland was, at the beginning of the 21st century, one of the world's leading platforms for trading petroleum, metals, and agricultural products.

== Swiss flag and merchant marine ==
Switzerland initially became aware of its need for merchant ships during World War I and experienced another supply crisis during World War II, which forced it to deploy ships worldwide, eventually establishing its own maritime fleet flying the Swiss flag in 1941. The venture proved successful, leading to the decision to retain the fleet after the war ended.

The fleet's home port is Basel. In 2010, a fleet of 37 ships flew the Swiss flag, which was made up of bulk carriers, container ships, multi-purpose freighters and tankers, totalling one million tonnes and operated by six shipping companies. By 2022, the fleet had declined to 14 ships, down from 49 in 2016.

== See also ==
- Transit trade in Switzerland

== Bibliography ==
- Iselin, Isaak; Lüthy, Herbert; Schiess, Walter Sebastian: Der schweizerische Grosshandel in Geschichte und Gegenwart, 1943.
- Witschi, Beat: Schweizer auf imperialistischen Pfaden. Die schweizerischen Handelsbeziehungen mit der Levante 1848 bis 1914, 1987.
- Fischer, Thomas: "Toggenburger Buntweberei auf dem Weltmarkt. Ein Beispiel schweizerischer Unternehmerstrategien im 19. Jahrhundert", in: Bairoch, Paul; Körner, Martin (ed.): La Suisse dans l'économie mondiale (15e-20e s.), 1990, pp. 183-205.
- Guex, Sébastien: "The development of swiss trading companies in the twentieth century", in: Jones, Geoffrey (ed.), The Multinational Traders, 1998, pp. 150-172.
- Stettler, Niklaus; Haenger, Peter; Labhardt, Robert: Baumwolle, Sklaven und Kredite. Die Basler Welthandelsfirma Christoph Burckhardt & Cie. in revolutionärer Zeit (1789-1815), 2004.
- David, Thomas; Etemad, Bouda; Schaufelbuehl, Janick Marina: La Suisse et l'esclavage des Noirs, 2005.
- Fässler, Hans: Une Suisse esclavagiste. Voyage dans un pays au-dessus de tout soupçon, 2007 (German 2005).
- Franc, Andrea: Wie die Schweiz zur Schokolade kam. Der Kakaohandel der Basler Handelsgesellschaft mit der Kolonie Goldküste (1893-1960), 2008.
- Zangger, Andreas: Koloniale Schweiz. Ein Stück Globalgeschichte zwischen Europa und Südostasien (1860-1930), 2011.
- Dejung, Christof: Die Fäden des globalen Marktes. Eine Sozial- und Kulturgeschichte des Welthandels am Beispiel der Handelsfirma Gebrüder Volkart 1851-1999, 2013.
- Christ, Heinrich: Zwischen Religion und Geschäft. Die Basler Missions-Handlungs-Gesellschaft und ihre Unternehmensethik, 1859-1917, 2015.
- Veyrassat, Béatrice: Histoire de la Suisse et des Suisses dans la marche du monde (XVIIe siècle-Première Guerre mondiale). Espaces – Circulations – Echanges, 2018.
- Haller, Lea: Transithandel. Geld und Warenströme im globalen Kapitalismus, 2019.
