= Khyber Pass Economic Corridor =

- Mission statement: Motorway expansion, special economic zones, commercial activities, multilateral trade
- Type of project: Economic corridor
- Location: Khyber Pakhtunkhwa
- Country: Pakistan
- Ministry: Ministry of Planning Development and Special Initiatives
- Established: 13 December 2019 (6 years ago)
- Budget: $482.75 million
- Status: Project approval granted

Khyber Pass Economic Corridor (KPEC) (Urdu: درۂ خیبر اقتصادی راہداری; Pashto: د خيبر دره اقتصادي دهلیز) is an infrastructure project that aims to expand Pakistan's economic connectivity with Afghanistan, and by extension Central Asia, via the Khyber Pass. The project was approved for construction in December 2019 by Pakistan and the World Bank at an expenditure of $482.75 million.

== History and background ==
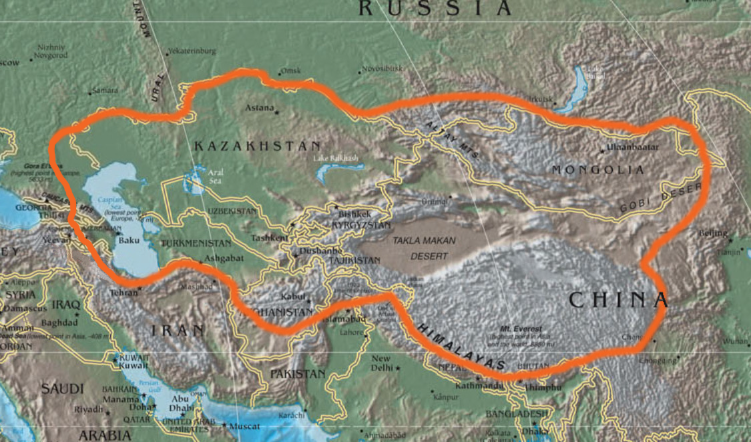
Political extent of Central Asia, including Pakistan's northwest.

KPEC is inspired by the historic Khyber Pass route, which traverses the Afghan–Pakistani border and has facilitated trade between Central and South Asia for millennia. The project is part of Corridors 5 and 6 of the Central Asia Regional Economic Cooperation Program (CAREC), which seeks to provide the shortest trade route between Uzbekistan, Tajikistan, Afghanistan, Pakistan and the strategic Arabian Sea to the south. With the exception of Pakistan, the other three countries are landlocked states. While Corridor 6 is concerned with providing the region's connectivity to Europe, the Middle East and Russia, Corridor 5 runs directly through Pakistan. It will, in the long term, enable Pakistan's access to Central Asian markets and Central Asian access to Pakistan's seaports.

== Projects ==
The member states of CAREC envisage a series of planned road projects which will ultimately link Dushanbe to the port city of Karachi, via the planned Peshawar–Kabul–Dushanbe motorway. The 281 km-long Peshawar–Kabul Motorway section will principally include, under the aegis of KPEC, the E1 Expressway – also known as the Peshawar–Torkham Expressway (PTEX) project – a four lane, 7.3 metre-wide, 48 km-long high-speed dual carriageway that will connect Peshawar in Pakistan to the Torkham border with Afghanistan by June 2024. Torkham will be linked onward to Kabul by the Afghan government via the 76 km-long Torkham–Jalalabad Motorway and 155 km-long Jalalabad–Kabul Motorway nodes, while Peshawar will connect the rest of Pakistan under the existing Peshawar–Islamabad–Lahore–Karachi Trans-Pakistan Expressway system.

== Financing ==
On 13 December 2019, the project was approved by the government of Pakistan and the World Bank at a total cost of $482.75 million in Islamabad; of this, $22.15 million will be contributed by Pakistan, and the remaining $460.60 million will be based on concessional funding as committed by the World Bank. The loan has a maturity of 30 years at an interest rate of 1.25 percent, and allows for a grace period of five years. Public–private partnership and private financing is also expected for the various clusters of economic activities and zones comprising the corridor.

The corridor was conceptualised by the National Highway Authority (NHA) and the Government of Khyber Pakhtunkhwa, the province where the project is being undertaken, while the planning aspects are being managed by the federal Ministry of Planning Development & Special Initiatives. Other key government stakeholders included the Ministry of Communications, Ministry of Commerce and Ministry of States and Frontier Regions.

== Economic impact ==
One of KPEC's primary objectives is to economically integrate South and Central Asia, which the corridor will make possible through increasing the volume of direct trade between Pakistan and Afghanistan, promotion of private-sector development, expansion of transport infrastructure and economic zones up to Central Asia, reduction of transit time and costs associated with the current regional trade, and an overall increase in commercial traffic. It is expected to add substantial growth to the economy of Khyber Pakhtunkhwa, including creating over 100,000 new jobs and promoting development in the regions adjoining the expressway. It would also aid in uplifting the economic development of the former tribal districts merged into Khyber Pakhtunkhwa, and significantly reduce on-road travel time between Peshawar and Torkham.

== Challenges ==
In September 2019, the Planning Commission noted that the viability of the project could be affected by the delay in construction of the Torkham–Kabul route on the Afghan side, where the infrastructure was "nonexistent". These concerns were further compounded due to the conflict in Afghanistan, and the resulting security situation.

== See also ==
- Afghanistan–Pakistan Transit Trade Agreement, a bilateral trade agreement
- China–Pakistan Economic Corridor
- Foreign trade of Pakistan
- Geostrategy in Central Asia
- Quadrilateral Traffic in Transit Agreement, a Pakistani trade route to Central Asia circumventing Afghanistan
