= Paul Reinhart AG =

Swiss merchant firm

Paul Reinhart Ltd.

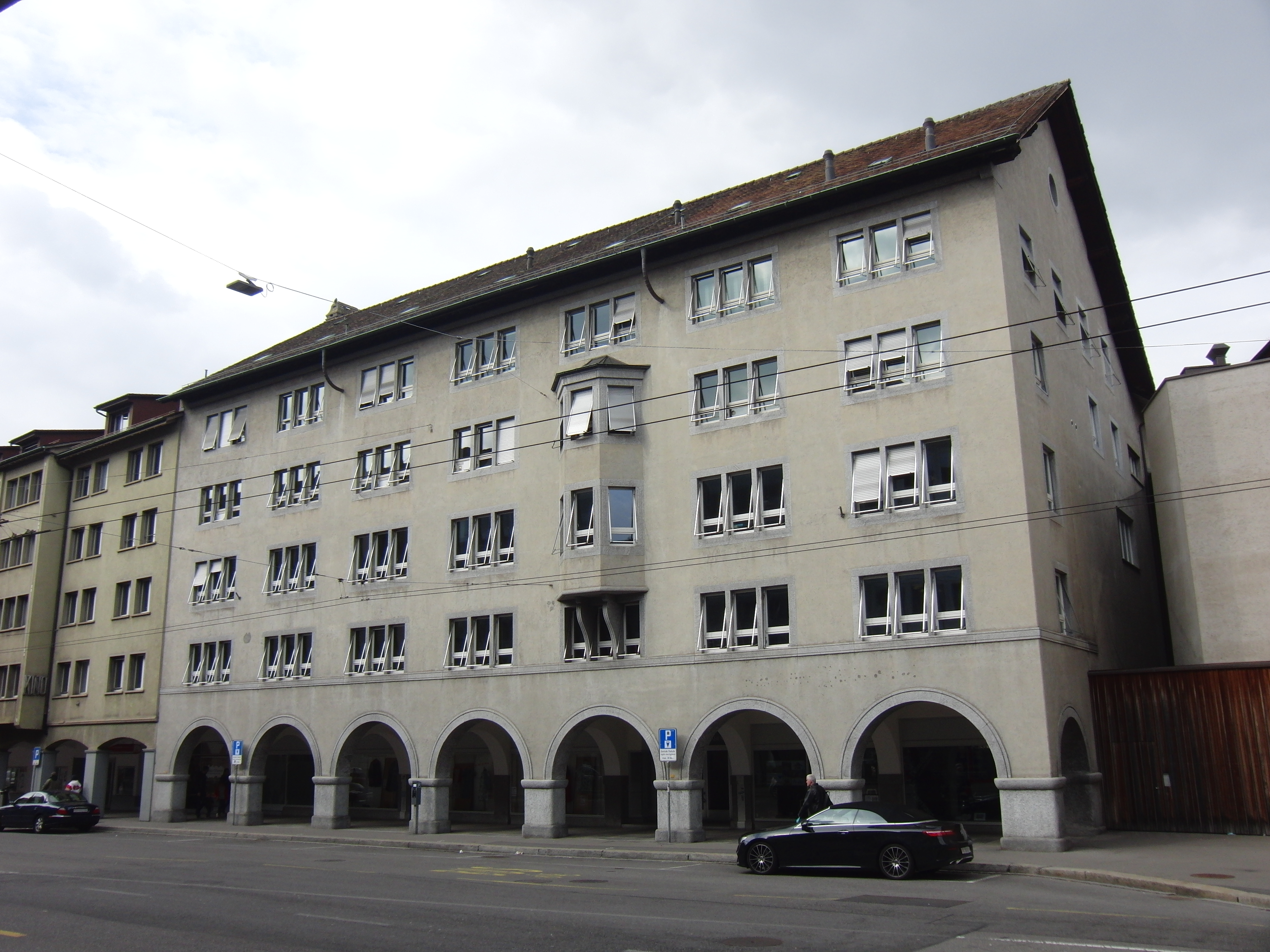
- Reinhart's headquarters in the "Haus zum Letzengraben", Winterthur
- Native name: Paul Reinhart AG
- Formerly: Volkart Brothers (integrated in 1989)
- Company type: Private
- Industry: Commodity trading, agricultural trading
- Founded: 1788; 237 years ago in Winterthur, Switzerland
- Founder: Johann Caspar Geilinger
- Headquarters: Winterthur
- Key people: P. Jürg Reinhart (Chairman); Thomas Paul Reinhart (Vice chairman); Matthias Reinhart (Board member); Markus F. Brütsch (Board member)
- Number of employees: 130
- Website: reinhart.ch

Paul Reinhart Ltd. (German: Paul Reinhart AG) is a Swiss merchant firm headquartered in Winterthur, Switzerland, that is primarily involved in agricultural trading. Founded in 1788 as collective partnership Geilinger & Blum it is today among the most important cotton merchants worldwide and one of the oldest companies in Winterthur.

== Overview ==
Paul Reinhart Ltd. has been a family-owned and managed company since 1788, currently in the eighth generation. It currently has the following divisions;

- Paul Reinhart Ltd. (operating business)
- Paul Reinhart Foundation (nonprofit organization)
- Wohlfahrtsfonds der Firma Paul Reinhart AG (private pension fund)

Since 1949, the company is headquartered in the "Haus zum Letzengraben" in Winterthur, Switzerland.
