= Salomon Volkart =

Swiss merchant and radical politician (1816–1893)

- Born: May 21, 1816; Niederglatt, Switzerland
- Died: December 24, 1893 (aged 77); Winterthur, Switzerland
- Occupations: Merchant, politician
- Spouse: Emma Sulzberger (m. 1848)
- Children: 6
- Parent(s): Johannes Volkart (father); Anna Wipf (mother)
- Relatives: Johann Georg Volkart (brother)

Salomon Volkart (21 May 1816 – 24 December 1893) was a Swiss merchant and radical politician from Winterthur, known for his pioneering role in maritime trade between Europe and India. He co-founded the trading company Gebrüder Volkart with his brother Johann Georg Volkart in 1851, which became one of Switzerland's most successful international trading firms.

== Early life and education ==
Salomon Volkart was born on 21 May 1816 in Niederglatt, the son of Johannes Volkart, an architect, and Anna Wipf. He was the brother of Johann Georg Volkart, who would later become his business partner. Volkart attended the Landknabeninstitut in Zurich, which was considered the best primary school for boys from rural areas of the canton at the time. From 1831 to 1832, he studied at the prestigious Hüni Institute in Horgen, a private secondary school where sons of wealthy rural families received commercial education. During his time there, he formed a friendship with Eduard Fierz, brother of Heinrich Fierz, for whom he would later travel to India.

In 1832, Volkart began an apprenticeship at the Zurich trading and banking house Caspar Schulthess & Cie at Rechberg. This early training in commerce and finance would prove foundational to his later business success.

== Early career ==
In 1836, Volkart was employed as a merchant by Andrea Croce's olive oil company in Genoa, which led him to travel extensively throughout Italy. From 1839, he worked as a cashier for the German firm Stellinger & Co. in Naples. When the company's headquarters was severely damaged by fire in 1844, Volkart returned to Switzerland.

Between 1844 and 1845, Volkart undertook a significant business journey to India via Italy, Malta, and Egypt on behalf of various Swiss, Italian, and Austrian textile mills and weaving workshops. This trip was aimed at strengthening existing commercial relationships and establishing new trade connections. Upon his return in spring 1846, he joined the dyeing and calico printing company Gebrüder Greuter & Rieter in Winterthur, for which he conducted several business trips across Europe.

In 1847, Volkart participated in the Sonderbund War as a first lieutenant of cavalry in the Zurich troops loyal to the Federal Diet. The following year, he married Emma Sulzberger, daughter of Johann Heinrich Sulzberger, a member of Winterthur's executive council and the city's finance director. The couple had six children.

== Founding of Gebrüder Volkart ==
In 1851, Salomon Volkart founded the partnership Gebrüder Volkart with his brother Johann Georg, establishing branches in Winterthur and Bombay. While Johann Georg managed the Bombay establishment, Salomon handled European affairs from Winterthur. The company's primary business model involved exporting European manufactured goods to India—initially paper, soap, and matches, later expanding to include watches, textiles, and machinery—and importing Indian raw materials to Europe, particularly cotton, but also oils, tea, coffee, cocoa, spices, and rubber.

The brothers leveraged their extensive network of commercial partners in Switzerland and abroad, their trading expertise, and particularly the economic and legal structures established in India by British colonial power to expand their fortune and develop their trading house. The company eventually established a subsidiary in London and six additional branches throughout the Indian subcontinent. After Johann Georg's death in 1861, Salomon continued the business alone until 1875, when he transferred operations to his son Georg Gottfried Volkart while remaining as a passive partner.

== Banking and industrial ventures ==
Recognizing that substantial long-term credit was essential for exporting raw materials from India, and that English commercial banks provided such credit only very restrictively, Volkart collaborated with other Winterthur merchants and industrialists to establish the Winterthur Bank (Banque de Winterthour) in 1862. He served as chairman of its board of directors from 1876 to 1883. The bank later merged with the Toggenburg Bank in 1912 to form the Union Bank of Switzerland (UBS), which eventually became UBS.

Volkart was also among the founders of several other significant institutions: the Winterthur Mortgage Bank (1865), the Swiss Locomotive and Machine Factory (1871), and the Swiss Accident Insurance Company (1875). These ventures demonstrated his role as an energetic organizer and influential, ambitious entrepreneur who extended his activities well beyond his trading firm.

== Political career ==
Politically, Volkart was a radical who served as a deputy in the Zurich Grand Council from 1866 to 1873. As a member of the Constitutional Assembly from 1868 to 1869, he participated in drafting the new cantonal constitution of 1869. From 1852 to 1871, he also served as consul of the Free Hanseatic City of Bremen in Winterthur.

== Death ==
Salomon Volkart died on 24 December 1893 in Winterthur.

== Bibliography ==
- Der Landbote, 27.12.1893.
- Reinhart, Georg: Gedenkschrift zum fünfundsiebzigjährigen Bestehen der Firma Gebr. Volkart, 1926, pp. 13–16.
- Leibacher, Oskar: Schweizer eigener Kraft. Lebensskizzen berühmter Auslandschweizer, 1936, pp. 18–22.
- Peter, Hans: «Salomon Volkart», in: Schweizer Pioniere der Wirtschaft und Technik, 6, 1956, pp. 45–63.
- Peyer, Hans Conrad: «Aus den Anfängen des schweizerischen Indienhandels. Briefe Salomon Volkarts an Johann Heinrich Fierz 1845-1846», in: Zürcher Taschenbuch auf das Jahr 1961, 1960, pp. 107–119.
- Anderegg, Jakob: Volkart Brothers 1851-1976. A Chronicle, vol. 1, 1979, pp. 25–32, 126-128 (typescript, Winterthurer Bibliotheken, Sondersammlung).
- Rambousek, Walter Heinrich; Vogt, Armin; Volkart, Hans Rudolf: Volkart. Die Geschichte einer Welthandelsfirma, 1990, pp. 41–43.
- Dejung, Christof: Die Fäden des globalen Marktes. Eine Sozial- und Kulturgeschichte des Welthandels am Beispiel der Handelsfirma Gebrüder Volkart 1851-1999, 2013, pp. 47–53, 175–182.
