= International Fund for Saving the Aral Sea =

Intergovernmental organization in Asia

- Международный Фонд спасения Арала
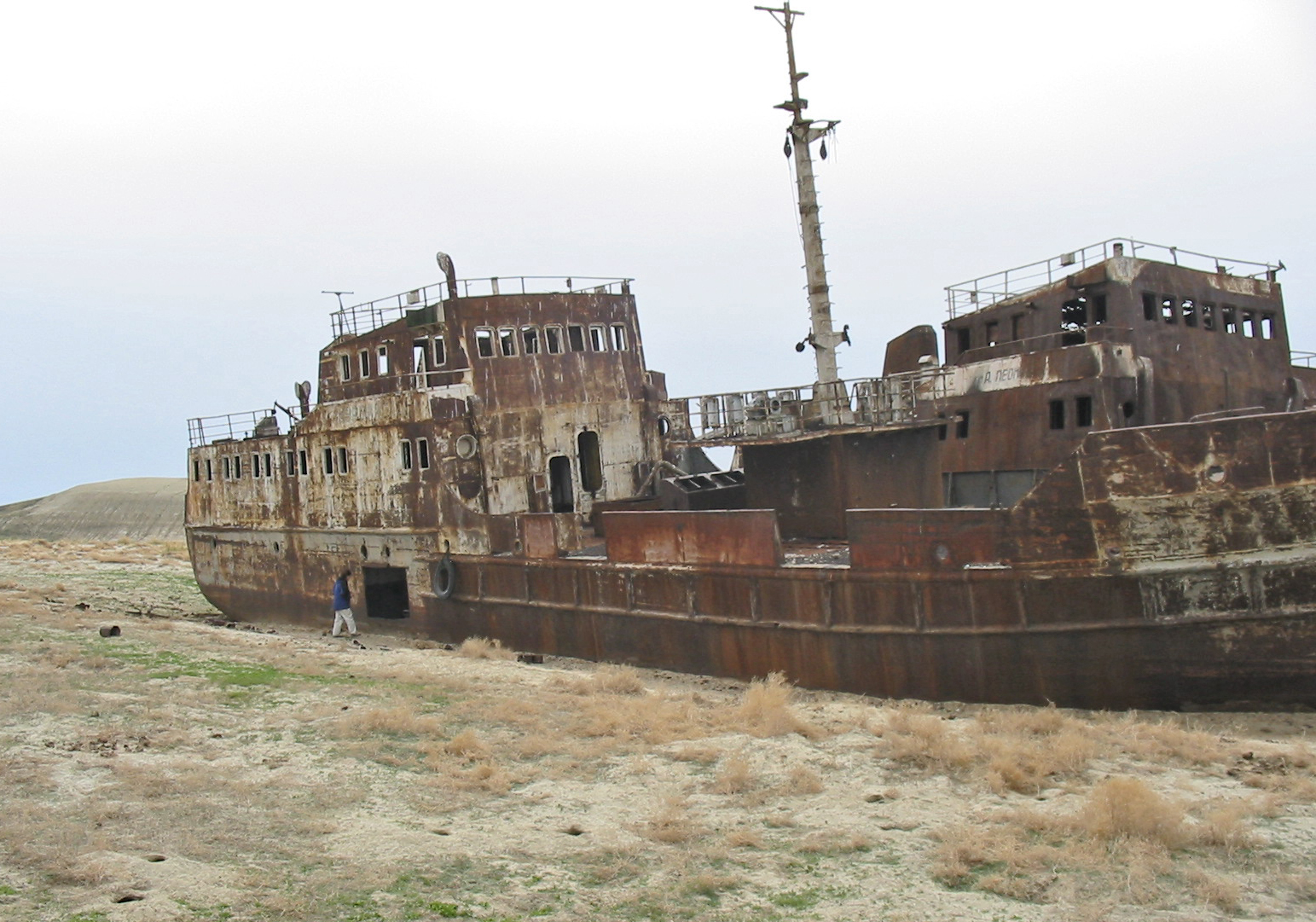
- The dry seabed of the Aral Sea with a rusted ship.

- Central Asia Region
- Abbreviation: IFAS
- Founded: January 4, 1993; 33 years ago
- Founder: Uzbekistan, Kazakhstan, Tajikistan, Kyrgyzstan, Turkmenistan
- Type: Intergovernmental organization
- Purpose: Funding projects that address the environmental and economic issues caused by the shrinking of the Aral Sea
- Headquarters: Almaty, Kazakhstan
- Locations: Tashkent, Uzbekistan; Dushanbe, Tajikistan
- President: Kassym-Jomart Tokayev (since 2024)
- Chairman of the Executive Committee: Askhat T. Orazbay
- Affiliations: United Nations; World Bank Group; European Union; German Society for International Cooperation (GIZ); Regional Environmental Centre for Central Asia (CAREC); United Nations Development Programme
- Website: https://ecifas.kz/en/

The International Fund for Saving the Aral Sea (IFAS) is an intergovernmental organization that was established in accordance with the decision of the Heads of State of Central Asia in 1993. The primary goal of IFAS is to finance and support collaborative initiatives and ecological and scientific-practical projects aimed at mitigating the catastrophic environmental and human impacts caused by the Aral Sea's desiccation, attributed to unsustainable irrigation practices during the Soviet era.

== History ==
On 23 June 1990 the Central Asian leaders issued a joint statement in Almaty, Kazakhstan, acknowledging the environmental crisis regarding the Aral Sea, calling for collective action to restore ecological balance. This led to the creation of an inter-republican commission and the foundation of the Fund to assist the affected populations.

Two years later President Nursultan Nazarbayev of Kazakhstan called on regional leaders to unite in stopping the Aral Sea's shrinking. On 4 January 1993 the Nazarbayev, President Askar Akayev of Kyrgyzstan, Chairman of the Supreme Council of Tajikistan Emomali Rakhmonov, President Islam Karimov of Uzbekistan, and President Saparmurat Niyazov of Turkmenistan assembled in Tashkent, Uzbekistan. The leaders discussed key issues posed by the Aral Sea such as price policies, communication development, energy supply, and the environmental challenges.

Establishing shared concerns and interests, the members adopted a collective approach to address the Aral Sea crisis. This initiative was formalized in the joint communiqué of the Heads of State of Central Asia. On 26 March 1993 the Agreement on Joint Actions was signed in Kyzylorda, which officially established the International Fund for Saving the Aral Sea (IFAS). Nazarbayev was elected as the first president of the Fund.

== Mission ==
IFAS aimed to ensure equitable distribution of water resources among the Aral Sea Basin countries while addressing ecological rehabilitation and economic challenges. Preliminary efforts included restoring delta ecosystems, slowing desertification from the exposed seabed, and reducing salt and dust storms that had devastating regional and global impacts.

IFAS also serves as a hub for collaboration, facilitating research, securing international funding, and fostering partnerships with global organizations to support sustainable development goals. Additionally IFAS works on capacity-building programs for regional stakeholders, strengthening water management capabilities through training and research.

== Structure ==
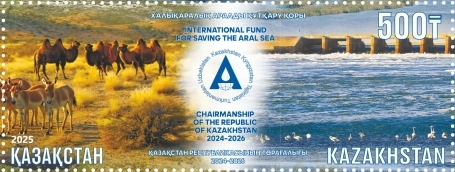
2025 Kazakh stamp dedicated to Kazakhstan's chairmanship at IFAS of the same year

The Council of Heads of State of the International Fund for Saving the Aral Sea is the highest governing body of IFAS.

This Council formulates and recommends policies to align the region's economies with its natural resource potential. It endorses intergovernmental legal and regulatory acts, establishes common principles for the management, use, and protection of water resources across the region. It also regulates intergovernmental relations related to water management and environmental protection activities.

Meetings of the Council of Heads of State, IFAS Summits, are held during the chairmanship of each founding state of the Fund, where key decisions are made on vital regional issues concerning water resources, environmental protection, and the socio-economic situation in the Aral Sea basin. The leadership of IFAS is rotated every three years among the Presidents of the Central Asian states.

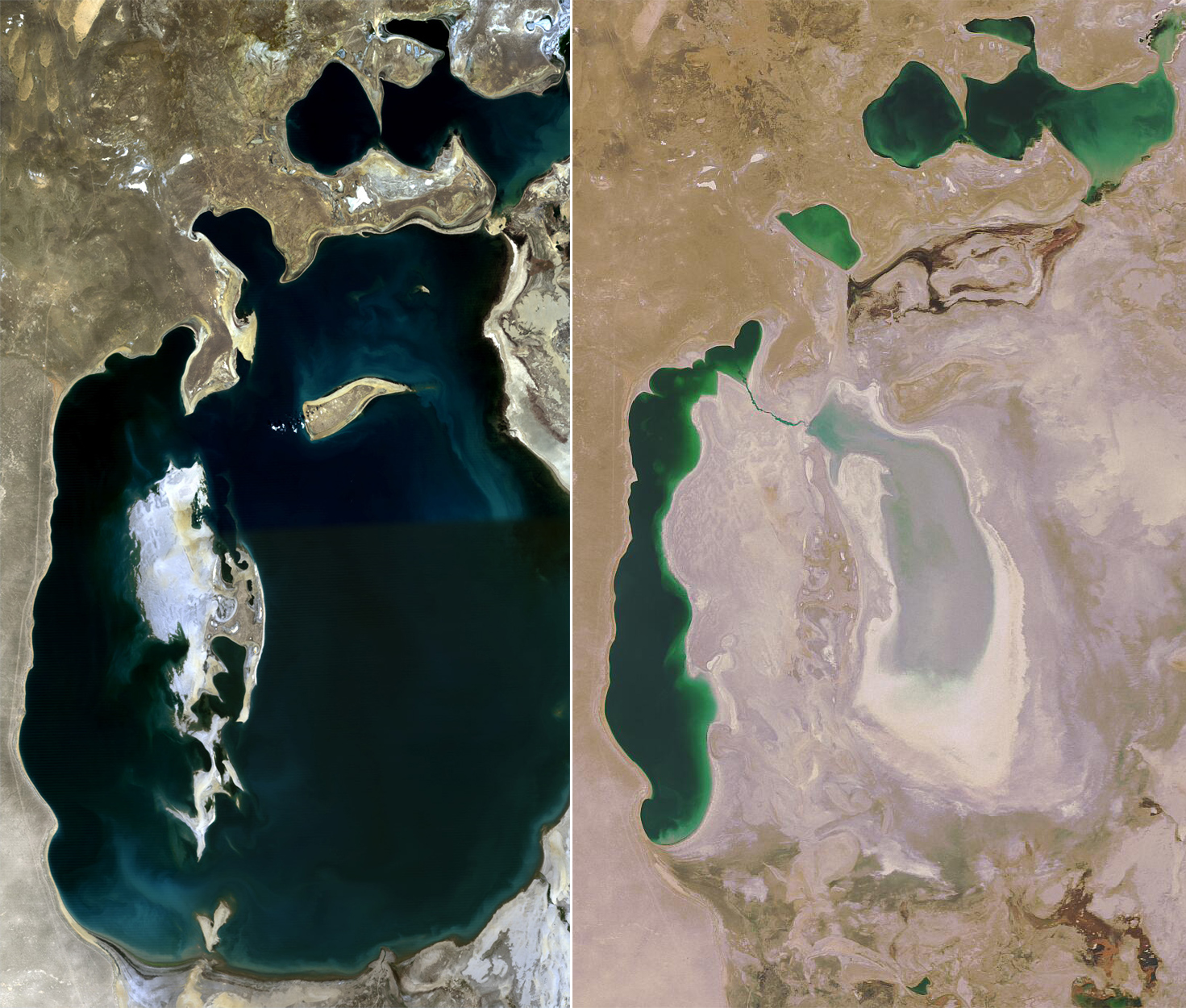
Satellite images of the Aral Sea from 1989 to 2008. The desiccation of the Aral Sea has been called one of the world's worst environmental disasters.

== Aral Sea Basin Programs ==
The IFAS has employed several initiatives to address the environmental, social, and economic challenges arising from the Aral Sea crisis. These manifest as the Aral Sea Basin Programs (ASBPs). Four are planned or have been implements from 1995 to 2030. The programs take a comprehensive approach to improving water resource management. They encourage sustainable agricultural practices, restoring degraded ecosystems, emphasize reducing water losses, advance water-conservation technologies, and strengthen institutional cooperation.

Other efforts focus on reforestation projects like planting saxaul trees, wetland restoration, which should revitalize local economies impacted by the decline in fisheries and agriculture.

=== ASBP-1 ===
The Aral Sea Basin Program-1 was the first large-scale initiative, implements from 1994 to 1997. The goal was to improve the socio-economic and environmental conditions in the Aral Sea region. It was approved by the Heads of State of Central Asia in January 1994, with coordination from the Interstate Commission for Water Coordination (ICWC) and support from the International Fund for Saving the Aral Sea (IFAS) as well as international donors. Its objectives include:

1. Environmental stabilization, which included projects regarding stopping desertification, preserving biodiversity, and protecting ecosystems
2. Socio-economic development through economic support and infrastructure projects
3. Water resource management addressed by equitable allocation of water resources among the Central Asian states, including the environmental needs of the Amudarya and Syrdarya river basins
4. Institutional development efforts designed to strengthen regional cooperation mechanisms and promote policy implementation

The cost of ASBP-1 was $60.8 million with $22.25 million coming through the World Bank. In 1997 when the preparatory phase tasks were completed, a review of the program's progress was conducted by the Central Asian countries in concert with international organizations, resulting in suggestions for the second phase.

Successful infrastructure projects include repairing irrigation systems, tree-planting to avoid further desertification, increased dam safety, and upgrading warning systems at nine dams. The program enhanced capacity by purchasing and installing water flow and quality monitoring equipment at twenty-five stations. It also supported the restoration of Sudochye Wetland, a nesting site for endangered migratory bird species.

The project faced challenges too. This included insufficient coordination among participating countries like limited resources for long-term project implementation and difficulties in reaching equitable water-sharing agreements.

The Aral Sea's dramatic shrinkage from the 1960s

=== ASBP-2 ===
From 2003 to 2010 the second project was implemented. The second project consisted of four areas of focus: water management, socio-economic development, environmental monitoring. Initiatives aimed to clean drinking water, advance health and education programming, restore damaged ecological areas, restore reservoirs in the Amu Darya and Syr Darya rivers, and work to restore the northern part of the Sea.

Its total budget of approximately $2 billion.

=== ASBP-3 ===
ASBP-3 was enacted over 2011-2015. This third iteration implemented over 300 national and regional projects with a total value of over $15 billion. Lack of financial resources, many of the planned regional projects did not come to pass. By 2016, the IFAS with support from international organizations, managed to implement six regional projects valued at approximately $100 million. Projects were selected from a pool 335 proposals, which were clustered into forty-seven priority projects.

=== ASBP-4 ===
ASBP-4, planned for 2021-2030, was developed in collaboration with international partners, through the support of the "Berlin Process," a predecessor to the Green Central Asia initiative. The program was designed as "a clearing house process for the definition of priorities of regional cooperation in Central Asia and will be shared with all national, regional and international stakeholders in the region for support and implementation." Building off of the previous programs, ASBP-4 prioritizes a "cooperative approach to water, climate and environment challenges the goal is to improve the livelihood of the population in the region."
