= Gur-e Mar =

- Location in Afghanistan
- Coordinates: 36°43′42″N 67°16′5″E
- Country: Afghanistan
- Province: Balkh Province
- Time zone: + 4.30

Gur-e Mar is a village in Balkh Province in northern Afghanistan.

On January 22, 2010, the construction was started of a 75 km rail link from Hairatan near the border with Uzbekistan to a terminal at Gur-e Mar. The project is contractually scheduled for completion by June 2011.

== See also ==
- Balkh Province
