= Afghanistan–Uzbekistan Friendship Bridge =

Soviet-era road–rail bridge

Coordinates: 37.2278°N 67.4282°E

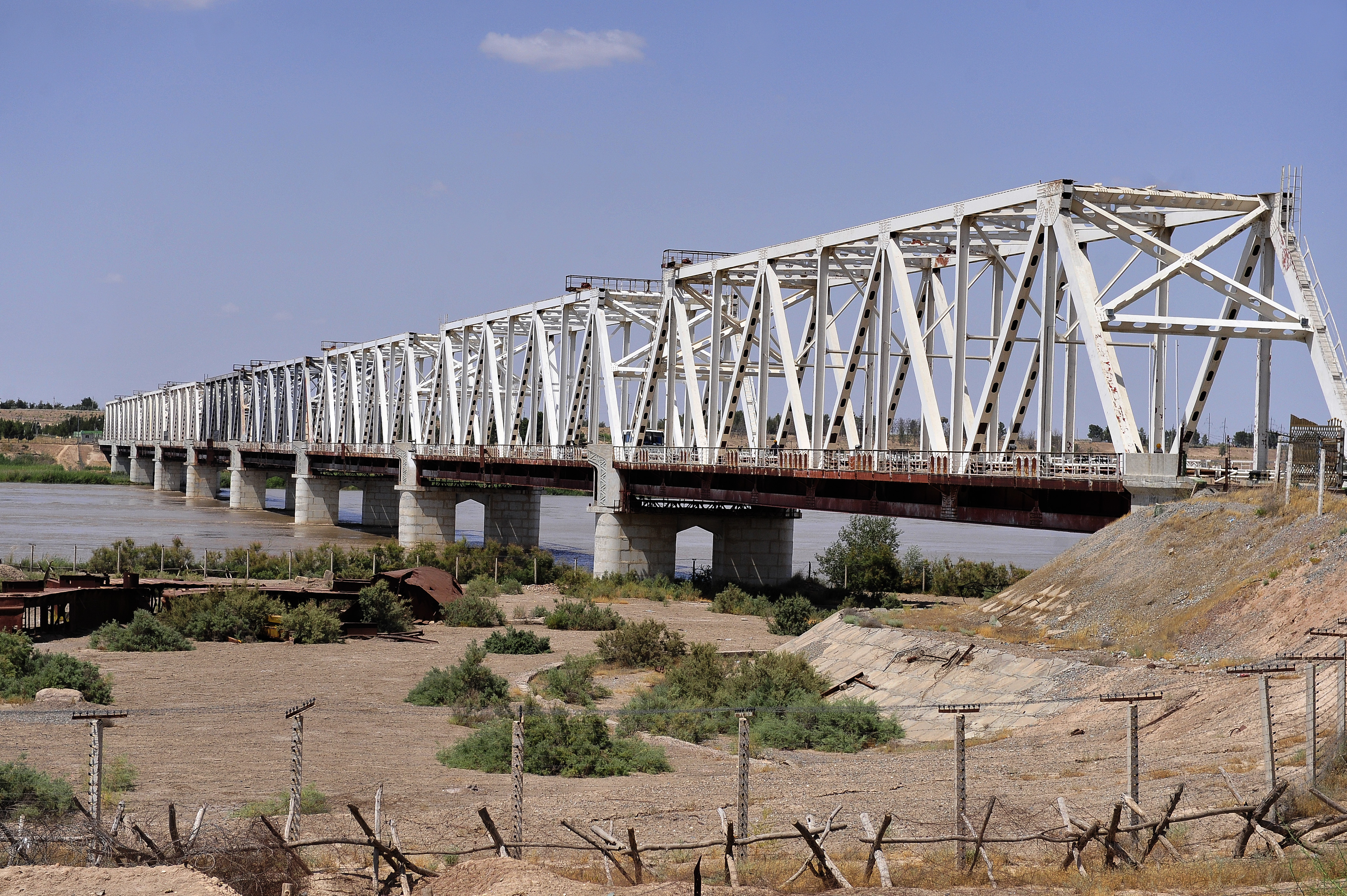
The Afghanistan–Uzbekistan Friendship Bridge in 2010

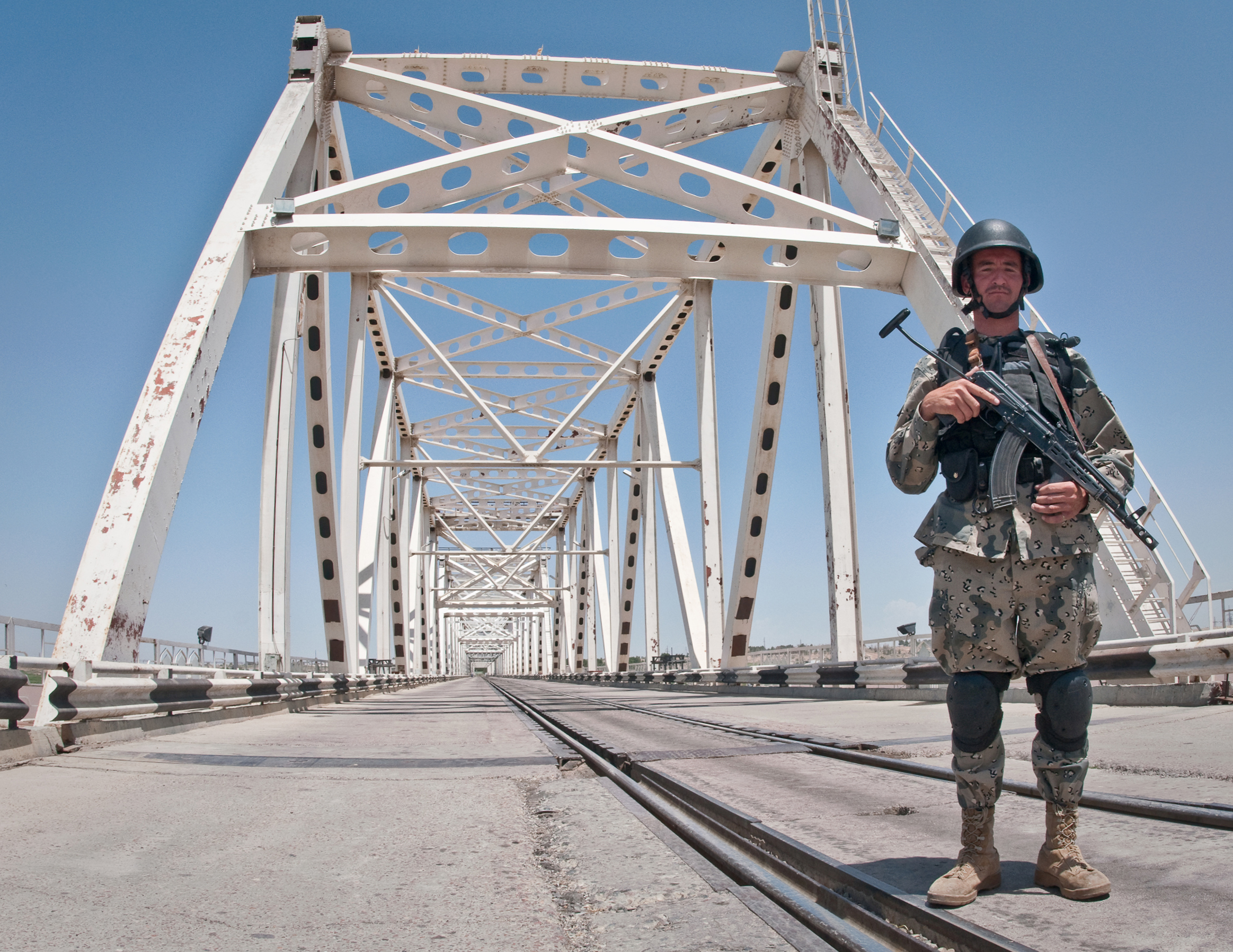
An Afghan Border Police officer standing on the Afghan side of the bridge in 2010.

The Afghanistan–Uzbekistan Friendship Bridge is a road–rail bridge across the Oxus River in Central Asia, connecting the town of Hairatan in Afghanistan with the town of Termez in Uzbekistan. It was built by the Soviet Union in the former Uzbek SSR and opened in 1982 as a military supply route during the Soviet–Afghan War. Today, it is used for trade and travel purposes between the two independent countries.

== Overview ==
The Friendship Bridge is the only fixed link across the Afghanistan–Uzbekistan border, which follows the Amu River for its entire length. The bridge is located some 75 kilometers (45 mi) north of the city of Mazar-i-Sharif. The nearest other bridge across the Amu Darya is some 120 kilometers (75 mi) to the west, a pipeline bridge crossing the Afghanistan-Turkmenistan border from/to the Lebap Region.

Before the Soviet–Afghan War, there was no fixed road or rail link between Afghanistan and Uzbekistan, which at the time was part of the Soviet Union. In 1982, several years after falling under Soviet occupation in Operation Storm-333, Afghanistan agreed to allow the Soviet Union to build a permanent replacement for the temporary pontoon bridge to resupply the Soviet 40th Army and Afghan National Army. It formally opened on May 12, 1982, at a ceremony attended by Afghan General Secretary Babrak Karmal and Soviet Uzbek First Secretary Sharof Rashidov. It was planned to link the Soviet railway network to Kabul by building a rail line across the bridge and through Puli Khumri and Bagram Air Base.

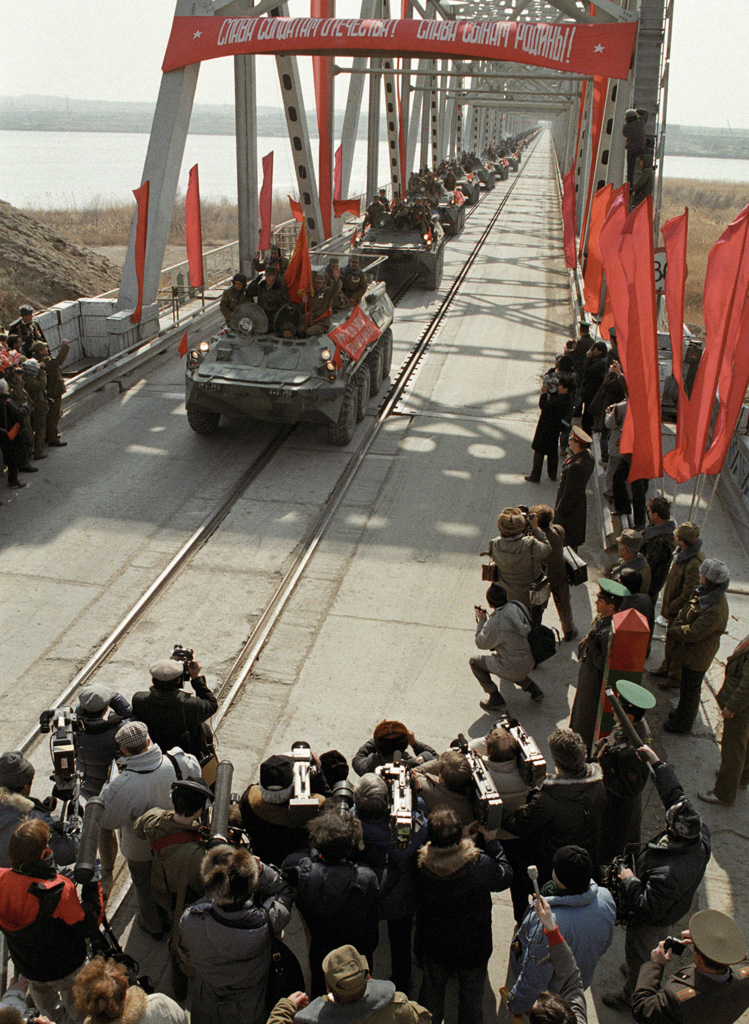
Last Soviet forces withdraw from Afghanistan crossing the bridge, 15 February 1989

During the war it was repeatedly attacked by the Afghan mujahedeen using magnetic depth charges supplied by the British Secret Intelligence Service, who also crossed the bridge to commit sabotage operations in Soviet Uzbekistan. The U.S. Central Intelligence Agency and the Pakistani Inter-Services Intelligence also planned to train militants to destroy the bridge through underwater demolition, but Pakistani President Muhammad Zia-ul-Haq rejected the idea to avoid Soviet reprisals on Pakistani communities near the border with Afghanistan. At the end of the war it was the site of the final withdrawal of Soviet troops from Afghanistan on February 15, 1989.

The bridge was closed in May 1997 when Taliban forces attacked the city of Mazar-i-Sharif, and Uzbekistan feared the disorder could spread across the border. In particular it feared that Islamist militants could use it to assist the Islamic Movement of Uzbekistan in overthrowing Uzbek President Islam Karimov. After the fall of Mazar-i-Sharif during the U.S. invasion the United States and the United Nations began pressuring Uzbekistan to reopen the bridge to provide international aid. It reopened on December 9, 2001, with an Uzbek Railways shipment of 1,000 tons of grain and wheat, although it remained guarded by the Uzbek Armed Forces. The reopening was attended by World Food Programme and Northern Alliance officials, including Abdul Rashid Dostum. Uzbekistan would close the bridge again in 2005 in response to deteriorating conditions in northern Afghanistan. Although it was reopened in 2009, it was found to be in too poor condition to transport large amounts of aid over.

Work began in January 2010 to extend the railway to Mazar-i-Sharif as part of the Central Asia Regional Economic Cooperation Program, which was completed in November of the same year with funding from the Asian Development Bank, the World Bank, and the International Monetary Fund. In 2011, as the bridge became an increasingly important supply route for NATO's International Security Assistance Force, the first train traveled the new route. In 2012 the U.S. Army began scaling back its presence at the bridge as it began its withdrawal from Afghanistan and turning it over to the Afghan National Police.

In 2019, during the Afghan peace negotiations, Uzbekistan, Afghanistan, and the Taliban agreed to allow Uzbekistan to maintain a rail link between the bridge and Mazar-i-Sharif. After the 2021 withdrawal of U.S. Armed Forces from Afghanistan and the 2021 Taliban offensive, the bridge began carrying more Afghan trade to Tajikistan, but the Uzbek government refused to allow Afghan government officials to cross the bridge to seek asylum.

== See also ==
- Rail transport in Afghanistan
- Rail transport in Uzbekistan
- Tajik–Afghan Friendship Bridge
- Tajik–Afghan bridge at Tem-Demogan
- Tajik–Afghan bridge at Panji Poyon
- List of international bridges
