= Peshawar–Kabul–Dushanbe motorway =

Proposed road in Pakistan

Peshawar–Kabul–Dushanbe motorway
- ایم ١٧ موٹروے

Route information
- Part of AH1
- Maintained by NHA
- Length: 265 km (165 mi)
- History: Proposed Motorway

Major junctions
- East end: Peshawar (Pakistan)
- West end: Dushanbe (Tajikistan)

Location
- Country: Pakistan
- Major cities: Peshawar, Kabul, Dushanbe

Highway system
- Roads in Pakistan

The Peshawar–Kabul–Dushanbe Motorway is a proposed motorway that would link the capital of Tajikistan, Dushanbe, to the port city of Karachi, via Khyber Pass the planned Peshawar–Kabul–Dushanbe motorway is a part of Khyber Pass Economic Corridor.

== Khyber Pass Economic Corridor ==
Peshawar–Kabul–Dushanbe motorway is part of Khyber Pass Economic Corridor.

== Details ==
It is expected to become a vital link to Afghanistan and Central Asia. It will be part of the Pakistan's Motorway Network. On March 4, 2015, the Pakistan government informed the National Assembly that a technical feasibility to construct the motorway was under consideration.

== Sections ==
The motorway would be divided into three parts, 50 km long Peshawar-Torkham, 76 km Torkham-Jalalabad and 139 km Jalalabad-Kabul last section will be Kabul to Dushanbe.

== See also ==
- Motorways of Pakistan
- National Highways of Pakistan
- Transport in Pakistan
- National Highway Authority
