= Waste management in Kazakhstan =

Waste management in Kazakhstan is an important concern within the country, considering the billions of tons of industrial waste produced yearly, the currently less-than-optimal state of solid waste management, and existing toxins remaining from both pollutants and Kazakhstan's historical position as the USSR's testing grounds for rockets and nuclear weapons. Kazakhstan has very few services for recycling solid waste, and waste management is currently dealt with using regional programs.

== Main waste management sectors ==
=== Industrial waste ===
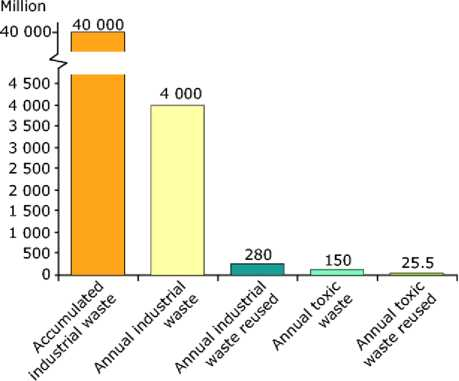
Industrial waste generation and accumulation in Kazakhstan as of November 12, 2012

Continuous generation and accumulation of waste, including hazardous waste (Persistent Organic Pollutants (POPs), medical waste, etc.). Almost one third of industrial waste in the country is accumulated in Karaganda region - more than 8.5 billion tons by the end of 2012.

The main volume of emissions in Karaganda region accounts for metallurgical sphere and equals to 70%. This is the share of two major metallurgic companies - Arcelor Mittal Temirtau JSC and Kazakhmys Corporation. In the period from 2008 to 2012 Arcelor Mittal Temirtau has paid the penalty of more than one billion tenge for noncompliance of emission standards, Kazakhmys Corporation - more than 300 million tenge. According to the results of 2012 the expected decline in total emissions in Karaganda equals to 31% compared to 2008. This is mainly the merit of environmental protection program of a single enterprise - "BalkhashTsvetMet", a subsidiary of Kazakhmys Corporation. In 2008 "BalkhashTsvetMet" has commissioned production on the basis of sulfuric acid. This action has reduced the emissions of sulfur dioxide from 578,000 tons in 2008 to 254,000 tons in 2012. In Kazakhstan, as elsewhere in the world, liquid and gaseous types of industrial waste are a major concern for environmental organizations. Industrial discharges and gaseous emissions are priorities for state control and regulation of all enterprises in Kazakhstan. Methods of inspection, as well as ecological and economic standards have been developed in the country for all categories of liquid and gaseous waste products. At the same time, solid waste produced by the mining, concentrating, refining and power industries has accumulated all over the country without controls. This is largely caused by the following factors:

- Lack of research on environmental impact assessment (EIA) of solid waste and health risks;
- Absence of legal and economic leverage to control the entities storing waste in breach of sanitary regulations;
- Lack of a regulatory framework and technical equipment for environmental monitoring at the local level;
- Lack of access to information on waste composition and class of hazard

The issue of solid waste accumulation is of special concern in Kazakhstan given its economy's reliance on extraction and processing industries, which produce a huge amount of waste. About 21 billion tons of solid waste of all types has accumulated in the country. Its incremental growth amounts to 1 billion tons a year (Annex). Most solid waste is stored in Karaganda (29.4%), Eastern Kazakhstan (25.7%), Kostanai (17.0%) and Pavlodar (14.6%) oblasts.

=== Consumption waste ===
According to the Ministry of Environment, the country has accumulated 23 billion tons of municipal solid waste (MSW). The annual increase of accumulated solid waste is 700 million tons. Only 3–5% of garbage is being recycled. About 97% is stored in outdoor dumps. The greatest amount of MSW is concentrated in Almaty, the most populous city in the country. During last year, city dumps accumulated 470 thousand tons of solid waste.

Today, there are 4,587 garbage polygons in the country, 3,927 of which do not meet environmental and health standards. Only 603 polygons (13%) meet the health standards to some extent, and are authorized to emissions to the environment.

== Waste processing and utilization ==
Kazakhstan has practically no waste recycling enterprises. The few currently operating recyclers face a number of financial and organizational constraints. For instance, in Pavlodar there are two enterprises employing unique technologies (up to 96% of waste is used in the production process). They are: Pavlodar Ash-Sludge Waste Processing Plant JSC and EMEKO JSC. The base raw materials used by these enterprises are bauxite slime of Aluminum of Kazakhstan JSC and ash waste of Pavlodar TES-1, resulting from combustion of Ekibastuz coal with high ash content. The plant produces 14 kinds of construction materials, such as brick (including fire-resistant), cement, etc. Provided the plant operates on a two-shift basis, it can annually process 32,000 tons of slime and 38 tons of ash. However, it cannot operate at full capacity due to lack of working capital. Enterprises of the ore dressing and metallurgical complexes, petrochemical, heat-and-power generating facilities, coal pits, etc. use industrial waste for the mining-technical reclamation of tailings, ash dumps, overburden dumps and hosting rocks. Thus, in waste-intensive areas (East Kazakhstan, Karaganda, Kostanai and Pavlodar oblasts) the percentage of industrial waste usage varies, from 1.5-2% in Pavlodar oblast to 25% in Karaganda oblast. A high level of waste utilization has been achieved in this oblast in the last two years mainly due to the use of overburden and hosting rocks for technical reclamation of up to 85% of the used and disturbed land. The metallurgical slime stored on test sites is usually buried. This is largely due to lack of efficient and cost-effective recycling technologies. A small part of the waste is used in production and construction technologies by Ispat-Karmet JSC (Karaganda oblast), where practically all metallurgical slag is processed and reused. Zhairem Tsvet Мет JSC and the Balkhash smelter of Kazakhmys Corporation process all the metallurgical slag accumulated throughout the year, together with ore, in the production of copper concentrate.

The following technologies of waste processing and neutralization are applied at Sokolovsko-Sarbaisky smelter (Kostanai Oblast): crushing of rocks for construction; use of mill tailings in the extraction of collective sulfide concentrate by a floatation unit and its further processing at the mining-chemical integrated works, although this technology has yet to be finalized. In 2000 Maikainzoloto OJSC (Pavlodar Oblast) started to use off-balance ores from overburdened soil dumps, including dumps located in the Maikain settlement. Maikainzoloto JSC, jointly with Technopark- Stepnogorsk JSC, plans to apply environmentally friendly technology in the production of the copper-zinc concentrate without cyanides.

Ferrochrome JSC (Aktyube Oblast) is an example of successful industrial waste utilization and processing. This JSC has started to produce crushed stone from the scoria of high and low-carbon ferrochrome (more than 150.0 tons per year) and ferrodust (more than 4,000 tons per year) which is further used in the manufacturing of lime-and-sand brick (more than 12,000 pieces per year). In addition, the company plans to use a bin for the reception and sorting out of the waste for further recycling. A dedicated area will be used to store metal scrap.

Private sector participation in solid waste disposal helps to raise significantly the efficiency of recycling. For instance, in Pavlodar the situation improved after solid waste management was transferred to Polygon MDS JSC (accumulator of solid waste of III-IV class of hazard) and Spetsmashiny JSC (the city solid waste land fill). Another private company, which is part of Pavlodar Chemical Plant JSC, is engaged in collection, employing the technology of Tolyatti IFC Chelnok JSC (Russia). The enterprise has so far recycled more than 90,000 lamps. Experimental work has been conducted on ‘demercurization’ in the use of fluorescent lamps of Petropavlovsk by ZIKSTO JSC. In Almaty oblast the mercury-containing waste and fluorescent lamps are delivered for demercurization to the specialized enterprise Synap JSC (Almaty). A facility for the centralized collection, storage and recycling of utilized luminescent, mercury lamps and devices has been opened in Uralsk, western Kazakhstan.

Recycling efforts are being made in West Kazakhstan also. For instance, Stroitekh JSC has begun to recycle broken glass and produce consumer goods from them. A similar project is being developed by Zheksengaly JSC. Uralvtorma Research and Production Association has designed a project on recycling wood-shavings, scrap paper, wool to produce composite building slabs used in the construction industry. In order to resolve the problem of waste management, it is necessary to develop a National Waste Management Program, spelling out waste management policies, a legal framework and methodology for waste disposal, an economic mechanism for waste management and monitoring. Implementation of this program requires: an inventory of existing tailings and dumps and assessment of their technical condition; specification and analysis of flows, volumes and components of accumulated and buried waste; assessment of risks for decision-making.

== Waste processing facilities ==
The first municipal waste processing plant in Kazakhstan was opened in December 2007 in Almaty with support of local akimat. Vtorma-Ecology Plant covered 90% of the city's utilization of municipal solid waste (MSW). At that time Almaty accumulated about 600 tons of garbage per year. During 4.5–5 years, the company was to pay back $28 million investments and reach cost recovery by producing secondary materials - PET flex, plastic pellets, paper, ferrous and non-ferrous metals. But to the economic crisis the price of recyclables has fallen in 1,5-3 times, and the plant was not able to cover its costs and pay the loan, issued by "KazKom Bank". In October 2010 the plant was mothballed, criminal case of non-payment the wages was opened on Rustem Parmanbekov, director of the plant, and environmental prosecutor's office estimated the environmental damage in the amount of 7 million tenge.

In September 2012 Agency for Construction, Housing and Utilities of RK has presented the Program of construction of 41 waste processing plants around Kazakhstan within 10–15 years. Particularly, the Agency plans to open 10 plants until 2015. As the Agency informs, the pilot projects will be launched in Aktobe, Atyrau, Karaganda, Abai, Saran, Shakhtinsk, Kostanay, Pavlodar, Taldykorgan, Taraz, Ust-Kamenogorsk, Kokshetau, etc. These efforts will allow developing specific mechanisms of solid waste management in Kazakhstan and providing investors with one more sphere for investments.

First of the objects within the Program is Astana Waste Processing Plant, which was planned to open in October 2012 and cover all city needs in MSW utilization, with its productivity of 400,000 tons per year. The opening ceremony was held on December 24, 2012. This is the second waste processing plant in Kazakhstan after Almaty plant. The Astana plant was built on basis of Spanish technology. As regards to Almaty Plant, which is still not operating, the Agency claims that owners have to deal with their economic problems themselves.

The Program also covers Shymkent city, which has a dramatic situation with spontaneously growing dump close to residential areas of the city. For residents of these neighborhoods proximity to the dump has turned into serious health problems. Due to constant acrid smoke and smell of burning people get such diseases as asthma, bronchitis etc. The plant in Shymkent was planned to be built in 2007: "Construction is scheduled to start next spring and finish by fall," - declared the subcontractor in January 2007. But the choice of the landfill and other issues took more time than planned. Only in December 2009 an investment agreement with Shymkent Akimat was signed and area for polygon and plant was defined. In Fall 2011 it was again announced that construction of the plant begins. Municipal budget allocated 430 million tenge for the necessary infrastructure needs. Until the end of the year builders acquired approximately 20 million tenge.

But in April 2012, Akimat refused to continue funding the project. For the moment the project is still frozen. Operation of the plant is now under threat due to insufficient funds for restoration and permanent increase of the area of garbage dump.

The Agency for Construction, Housing and Utilities of RK has also named the city of Pavlodar among the first cities, where the plants will be built until 2015. For the moment, Pavlodar Akimat has announced that they have already chosen the place of 100 hectares for the construction of polygon. Work is expected to deploy on the existing city dump.

Another plant is planned to be constructed in Karaganda. By today, "Taza Dala" company was founded to manage this project, places for construction and polygon have been chosen. Now there are negotiations being held with several banks to participate in the project. Finally, in December 2012 it was announced that the modern MSW processing plant will be built in Aktau with support of EBRD: 2.4 billion tenge (€12.7 million equivalent) loan to State Communal Enterprise Koktem, Aktau's waste management company, will co-finance the new integrated mechanical-biological treatment facility and a new sanitary landfill. The project will be co-financed by the Clean Technology Fund which is providing a US$8 million loan.

The project will also be supported by a capital grant from the state budget. The Korean Donor Fund provided nearly €300,000 and the EBRDShareholder Special Fund is providing grants of nearly €800,000 for project management, design, engineering, training, operational improvements and other associated spending.
