= Dali, Afghanistan =

Dali
- Location in Afghanistan
- Coordinates: 37°18′43″N 66°34′35″E
- Country: Afghanistan
- Province: Balkh Province
- Time zone: + 4.30

Dali is a village in Balkh Province in northern Afghanistan.

It lies near the border with Uzbekistan.

== See also ==
- Balkh Province
