= Johann Georg Volkart =

Swiss merchant and entrepreneur in overseas trade

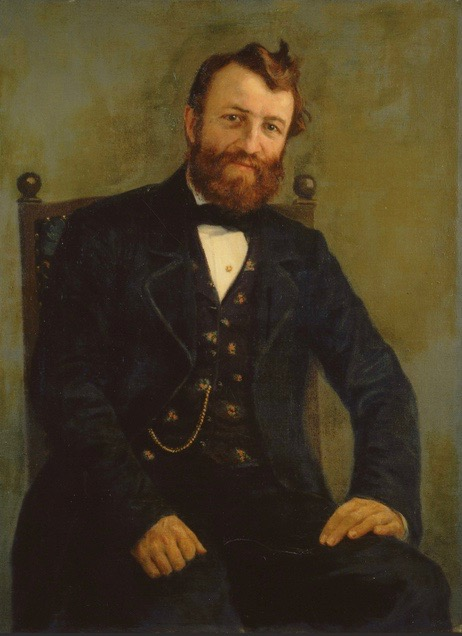
Portrait drawing of Johann Georg Volkart

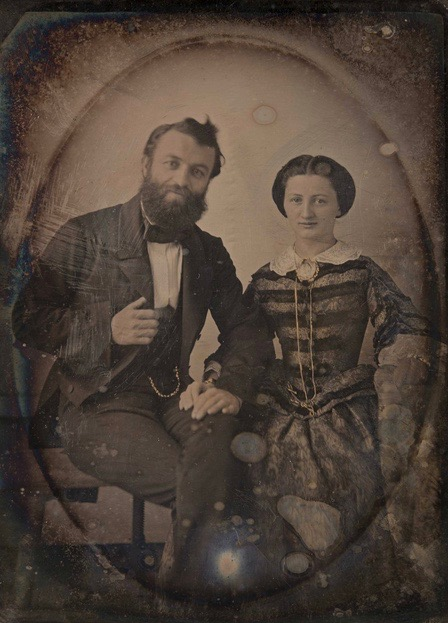
Johann Georg Volkart with Lilly Schönemann on the occasion of their engagement in Bombay

Johann Georg Volkart (27 December 1825 – 29 May 1861) was a Swiss merchant and entrepreneur active in overseas trade.

Volkart worked as a cotton buyer and then manager of the Bombay office of the German company Huschke, Wattenbach & Co. Following the closure of the Bombay branch in 1850, he returned to Switzerland where he co-founded the firm Volkart Brothers with his brother Salomon in 1851. Volkart was tasked with managing the Bombay operations, while Salomon remained in Winterthur. The trading company exchanged tea, coffee, spices, rubber, and other colonial goods for European manufactured goods, including soap, matches, paper, and later textiles and machinery. Cotton became the company's primary trade commodity in the 1860s. In 1884, the brothers also purchased a transport ship, which they named the President Furrer. In 1859, Volkart returned to India to resume leadership of the company's office. He died two years later in 1861. At the time of his death, he was also the Belgian, Swedish, and Dutch consul. Volkart Brothers remained the world's fourth-largest cotton trader until 1999.

== Personal life ==
Johann Georg Volkart was born in Niederglatt, the son of master builder Johannes Volkart (15 August 1783 – 11 September 1853) and his wife Anna, daughter of Captain and magistrate Hans Jakob Wipf. His older brother was Salomon Volkart.

His nephew was the later patron Georg Volkart (1850–1928), and his niece Anna Maria Volkart was married to politician Othmar Blumer.

In 1850, he married Lilly (born 1832 in Braunschweig), daughter of Hans Carl Schönemann from Braunschweig; the marriage remained childless.

After his death, his widow made a nearly six-month return journey by sailing ship from Bombay to Marseille and then to Switzerland.

== Career ==
Johann Georg Volkart began a commercial apprenticeship in 1845 with Heinrich Fierz at the cotton and silk export business Hüni & Fierz in Horgen. After completing his apprenticeship, he traveled to Bombay in 1847, working as a cotton buyer for the German company Huschke, Wattenbach & Co. By 1848, he took over the management of its Bombay branch. When the partners Huschke and Wattenbach parted ways, Volkart lost his position. Following the closure of the Bombay branch in 1850, he returned to Switzerland.

After his marriage, he co-founded the firm Volkart Brothers with his brother Salomon in 1851, establishing branches in Winterthur and Bombay. He was tasked with managing the Bombay operations, while Salomon remained in Winterthur. The trading company exchanged tea, coffee, spices, rubber, and other colonial goods for European manufactured goods, including soap, matches, paper, and later textiles and machinery.

Johann Georg Volkart was responsible for selling European consumer goods such as textiles, watches, and jewelry in India and procuring raw materials from the British colony. Initially, the firm imported coffee, spices, and coconut fibers to Europe, but cotton became the company's primary trade commodity in the 1860s.

In 1853, he and his brother undertook a ship journey to America, during which they were stranded near Lydd, England. To facilitate their return, a collection was organized by the Widows, Widowers, and Orphans Association of Zürich. Upon his return, Johann Georg traveled to Bombay, where he attended a meeting to improve connections between Europe and India. The following year, he and his brother purchased a transport ship in Hamburg, naming it President Furrer.

Due to health issues, he frequently stayed in Europe between 1854 and 1856. After opening new branches in Colombo and Kochi (India) in 1857, he appointed Henry L. Brodbeck as a partner and head of operations in India. Following Brodbeck's death in 1859, Volkart returned to India to resume leadership. Shortly before his planned return to Europe, he died on 29 May 1861, likely due to unfavorable climatic conditions or a tropical disease. After his death, his brother Salomon initially managed the company alone but later took on non-family partners. The company remained the world's fourth-largest cotton trader until 1999.

At the time of his death, he was a Belgian, Swedish, and Dutch consul.

== Honors and awards ==
Johann Georg Volkart was a knight of the Belgian Order of Leopold.

== Bibliography ==
- Obituary. In: Allgemeine Zeitung, 16 July 1861, No. 197, p. 3218 (Digital copy).
- Johann Georg Volkart. In: Christof Dejung: Die Fäden des globalen Marktes. Eine Sozial- und Kulturgeschichte des Welthandels am Beispiel der Handelsfirma Gebrüder Volkart 1851-1999. Böhlau, Köln 2013, ISBN 978-3-412-20986-5, pp. 1, 51–54, 63f., 127, 132, 175, 178ff., 182, 192, 195, 231, 273 (Digital copy).
- Christian Baertschi: Johann Georg Volkart. In: Historical Dictionary of Switzerland.
