= Afghanistan–Uzbekistan relations =

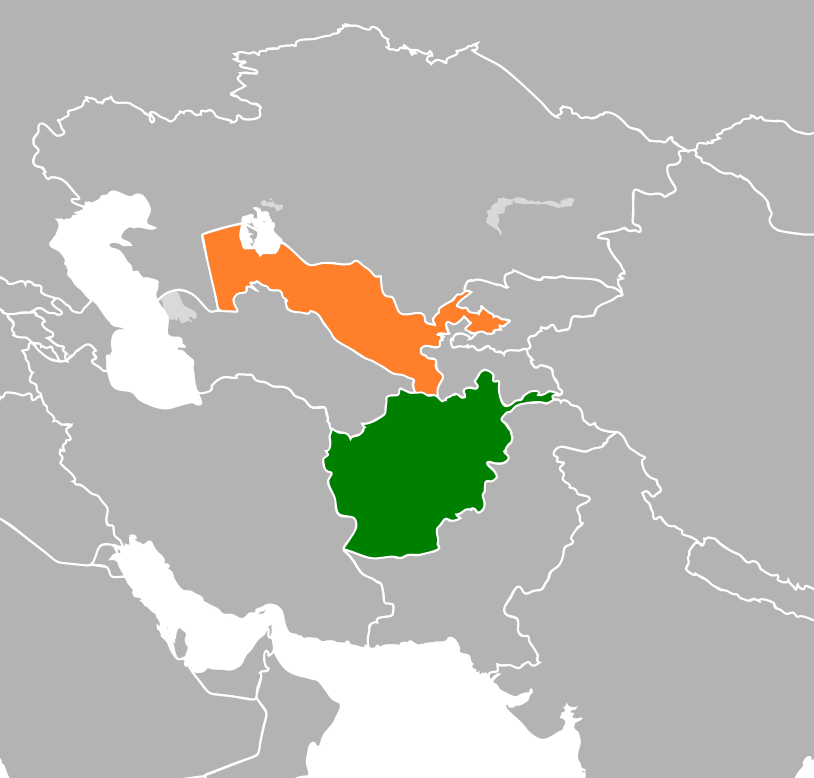

- Afghanistan: Uzbekistan

Afghanistan and Uzbekistan share a border and have some cultural ties. Northern Afghanistan is home to an estimated from 3.7 to 6.1 million ethnic Uzbeks, which is the second-largest concentration of Uzbek population in the world after Uzbekistan. Afghanistan also has a native dialect of the Uzbek language that, while using a different alphabet, is fully mutually intelligible with the Uzbek spoken in Uzbekistan. However the Uzbek language only has legal status in Uzbek majority provinces and no national government of Afghanistan has ever given official status to the Uzbek language.

After the Taliban's rise to power, the government of Uzbekistan closed its border with Afghanistan and announced it would not grant refugee status to any Afghans, and would not allow Afghans into Uzbekistan including Afghan-Uzbeks or Afghans with family in Uzbekistan. However the Interior Ministry of Uzbekistan that Afghan citizens staying in Uzbekistan on a visa would not be deported when their visa's expired.

== History ==
Historically, there was no clear border between Afghanistan and its neighbors. The country has been under the crossroad of various Karluk empires in the history, such as Chagatai Khanate, Timurid Empire, and Mughal Empire, both left significant marks in Afghan and Uzbek histories.

The Borders of modern day Central and South Asia were drawn by the British and Russian Empires during the great game. All the remaining land that was not conquered by the Russian or British Empires would be later be united as Afghanistan. This messy border drawing would be responsible for the cultural overlap between Afghanistan with Central Asia, and Afghanistan with South Asia. When the Russian Empire became the USSR hard borders were put in the region for the first time, Separating the Tajiks, Uzbeks, and Turkmen of Afghanistan with their Northern relatives.

After the rise of the communist government in Afghanistan, The Soviet Union (which included the Uzbek SSR) invaded to support the communist government. However due to ethnic affinities between Soviet Uzbeks, Tajiks, and Turkmen and their Afghan counterparts, as the war became more violent, Soviet Central Asians were largely replaced by Slavic troops. Still a total of 64 thousand Uzbeks fought in Afghanistan, At least 1,522 were killed and more than 2,500 left disabled. The former president of Uzbekistan, Islam Karimov, described the Soviet intervention in Afghanistan as "a major mistake".

After Shavkat Mirziyoyev became president of Uzbekistan, relations between Uzbekistan and its neighbors improved considerably. Uzbekistan began playing a larger regional role in trade, cultural connections, and as a mediator in the Afghan conflict. In 2017 the two countries signed more than 40 export agreements. Uzbekistans trade with its neighbors rose from $2.7 billion in 2016 to $5.2 billion in 2021 with almost 1/5 of that trade being with Afghanistan. In 2009, Afghan government officials began working with Central and South Asian governments to make an energy corridor through Afghanistan, allowing South Asian countries to buy electricity from Central Asian Nations.

For most of modern history Afghanistan has been relatively dependent on its neighbors, including Uzbekistan. In 2015, 73% of Afghanistans electricity was supplied by neighboring countries, with 53% of that being supplied by Uzbekistan. One result of this dependence on its neighbors is that Afghanistan does not have a unified energy grid, but instead multiple separate energy grids that branch out from one of its neighbors. In December 2021, Afghanistan’s electricity administration, Da Afghanistan Breshna Sherkat (DABS), announced that Uzbekistan had extended the agreement of exporting electricity into Afghanistan for 2022.

In May 2023, methamphetamine was found in a pomegranate juice shipment from Afghanistan to Uzbekistan.

In August 2024, 35 investment and trade agreements were signed between Afghanistan and Uzbekistan. These agreements collectively are worth $2.5 billion, and according to Uzbekistan's minister of Investment, Industry, and Trade, their current goal is to increase the volume of trade between Afghanistan and Uzbekistan to $3 billion dollars. In October 2024, Uzbekistan appointed Oybek Usmonov as ambassador to Afghanistan. Usmonov had previously served as Deputy Minister of Foreign Affairs and ambassador to Pakistan (2020-24) and Egypt.

== Border ==
The territories of Afghanistan and Uzbekistan were under a single control during the period of the Samanid, Ghaznavid and Timurid dynasties. In 1750, the Treaty of Friendship between Afghan emir Ahmad Shah Durrani and the Bukharan khan Mohammad Murad Bek resulted in the Amu Darya river becoming the official border of Afghanistan that remains to this day.

In 1981, with the help of Soviet builders, the Friendship Bridge was built - a railway bridge across the Amu Darya at a length of 816 meters.

In May 2021, Uzbekistan closed the border with Afghanistan.

== See also ==
- Foreign relations of Afghanistan
- Foreign relations of Uzbekistan
