= Afghanistan–Pakistan Transit Trade Agreement =

Bilateral trade agreement

The Afghanistan–Pakistan Transit Trade Agreement (also known as APTTA) is a bilateral trade agreement signed in 2010 by Pakistan and Afghanistan that calls for greater facilitation in the movement of goods amongst the two countries.

== Background ==
The 2010 agreement supersedes the 1965 Afghanistan Transit Trade Agreement, which granted Afghanistan the right to import duty-free goods through Pakistani seaports, mostly notably from Karachi. The 1965 agreement did not offer Pakistan reciprocal rights to export goods to the Soviet Union, nor to the Central Asian Republics after the fall of the USSR.

Trade in goods smuggled into Pakistan once constituted a major source of revenue for Afghanistan. Pakistan official goods imported into Afghanistan under the 1965 Afghanistan Transit Trade Agreement were often immediately smuggled back into Pakistan over the porous border that the two countries share, often with the help of corrupt officials. In addition to illegal transfer of goods back into Pakistan, items declared as Afghanistan-bound were often prematurely offloaded from trucks and smuggled into Pakistani markets without paying requisite duty fees. This resulted in the creation of a thriving black market, with much of the illegal trading occurring openly, as was common in Peshawar's bustling Karkhano Market, which was widely regarded as a smuggler's bazaar. In Pakistan clamped down in 2003 on the types of goods permitted duty-free transit, and introducing stringent measures and labels to prevent smuggling. re-routing of goods through Iran from the Persian Gulf increased significantly resulting in steep decreases of smuggled goods in Pakistani markets. The 2003 measures lead to drastic declines in the number of undocumented jobs related to the transit and sale of smuggled goods; jobs and revenues of which also helped fuel the black economy, often intertwined with the drug cartels, of both countries.

The ATTA did not grant Pakistan reciprocal rights to export goods across Afghan territory to neighbouring countries. Pakistani attempts to access the Central Asian markets were frustrated by political instability in Afghanistan that had been ongoing since the late 1970s. As Afghanistan became increasingly dangerous as a transit corridor, China, Pakistan, Kazakhstan, and Kyrgyzstan in 1995 devised a separate treaty named the "Quadrilateral Traffic in Transit Agreement" (QTTA), and signed the treaty in 2004. Despite signing of the QTTA, the agreements full potential was never realised, largely on account of poor infrastructure links between the four countries.

== Ratification ==
The United States emphasised the importance of a revised transit agreement between Pakistan and Afghanistan to revive trade route along the ancient Silk Road between South Asia, Central Asia, and the Middle East. As a result of the shortcomings of the ATTA, a new treaty between Afghanistan and Pakistan was necessary that would permit Afghanistan access to Indian markets, and Pakistan reciprocal access to Central Asian markets via Afghanistan – which by 2010 had been far more stable than it had been in the previous 20 years.

In July 2010, a Memorandum of understanding (MoU) was reached between Pakistan and Afghanistan for the Afghan-Pak Transit Trade Agreement (APTTA), which was observed by US Secretary of State Hillary Clinton. The two states also signed an MoU for the construction of rail tracks in Afghanistan to connect with Pakistan Railways (PR), which has been in the making since at least 2005.

In October 2010, the landmark APTTA agreement was signed by Pakistani Commerce Minister Makhdoom Amin Fahim and Anwar ul-Haq Ahady, Afghan Ministry of Commerce. The ceremony was attended by Richard Holbrooke, US Special Representative for Afghanistan and Pakistan, and a number of foreign ambassadors, Afghan parliamentarians and senior officials.

== Provisions of the 2010 Agreement ==
The 2010 APTTA allows for both countries to use each other's airports, railways, roads, and ports for transit trade along designated transit corridors. The agreement does not cover road transport vehicles from any third country, be it from India or any Central Asia country.

Afghan trucks are to enter Pakistan via border crossings at Torkham, Ghulam Khan, and Chaman to transit Afghan goods across Pakistani territory, and to import goods from Pakistani ports in Karachi, Port Qasim and Gwadar. The signed Agreement permits Afghanistan trucks access to Wagah border with India, where Afghan goods will be offloaded onto Indian trucks, but does not permit Indian goods to be loaded onto trucks for transit back to Afghanistan.

The APTTA agreement allows Afghan trucks to transport exports to India via Pakistan up to the Wagah crossing point, but does not offer Afghanistan the right to import Indian goods across Pakistani territory, out of fear that Indian goods would end up on the Pakistani black market in the same manner that was common under the 1965 ATTA. Instead, Afghan trucks offloaded at Wagah may return to Afghanistan loaded only with Pakistani, rather than Indian goods, in an attempt to prevent the formation of a black market for Indian goods in Pakistan.

The agreement provided Pakistan access to every country bordering Afghanistan, with access to Iran via the Islam Qila and Zaranj borders, Uzbekistan via the Hairatan border, Tajikistan via Ali Khanum and Sher Khan Bandar crossings, and Turkmenistan via the Aqina and Torghundi border crossings. Pakistani imports and exports are granted permission to enter Afghanistan via border crossings at Torkham, Ghulam Khan, and Chaman.

The APTTA calls for various measures to counter smuggling of duty-free goods into both Pakistan and Afghanistan by mandating: tracking devices of goods, banking guarantees and special bonded carrier licenses for transit trucks, vehicular tracking systems, and container security deposits.

The All Pakistan Customs Bonded Carriers Association (APCBCA) represents the bonded carrier sector in Pakistan. As of 2026, Tariq Gul serves as chairman of APCBCA.

The Afghanistan-Pakistan Transit Trade Coordination Authority (APTTCA) was created to coordinate the Afghanistan–Pakistan Transit Trade Agreement and meetings are held.

== Challenges ==
Implementation of the treaty has been inconsistent, with both sides complaining of continued barriers to trade.

Owing to tensions between the government of Hamid Karzai and Pakistan, much of the APTTA provisions remained unexploited after 2010. Pakistan is Afghanistan's largest trading partner, and Afghanistan is Pakistan's fourth-largest export market. Banking contacts between the two countries remain under developed, although Pakistan's commerce minister in 2015 pledged to improve such contacts.

Afghanistan has complained that anti-smuggling security measures agreed in the APTTA are restrictive cost-prohibitive, and that banking guarantee fees are excessively high and time-consuming, ranging from 100,000 to 150,000 Pakistani rupees per carrier. Banks from both countries have also refused to offer such guarantees, further delaying customs clearances.

The required truck-tracking systems have been implemented in Pakistan, while the Afghan side has yet to install such systems on their own trucks. Further, the reliability of Pakistani and Afghan trucks to travel through mountainous terrain in both countries has been called into question, while Afghan trucks frequently enter Pakistani territory without requisite insurance, thereby violating the terms of APTTA. Afghanistan also has not yet notified Pakistan of its customs transit rules required under the APTTA, despite repeated requests by Pakistan and assurances by the Afghan government.

Afghanistan also refuses to grant Pakistan the right to import and export goods from Central Asia across Afghan territory. The 2010 APTTA agreement allowed for Afghan goods to be exported to India via Pakistan territory, but did not permit Indian goods to in turn to be exported to Afghanistan across Pakistani territory.

During the visit of Afghan President Ashraf Ghani to India in April 2015, he stated "We will not provide equal transit access to Central Asia for Pakistani trucks" unless the Pakistani government included India as part of the 2010 Afghanistan–Pakistan Transit Trade Agreement to allow Indian goods to be transported across Pakistani territory, directly contradicting Article 5 of the Agreement which explicitly excludes Indian exports from the Agreement. Pakistan has rejected calls for India's inclusion, as the signed Agreement specifically denies Indian goods the right to transit across Pakistan.

While Afghan importers and exporters have full access to Pakistani seaports under APTTA, Afghanistan has alleged that Pakistani officials frequently stall shipments and cause unnecessary delays, especially after the 2011 NATO attack in Pakistan. In November 2010, the two states formed a joint chamber of commerce to expand trade relations and solve the problems traders face in this and other regards.

== Proposed inclusion of Tajikistan ==
In July 2012, Afghanistan and Pakistan agreed to extend APTTA to Tajikistan in what will be the first step for the establishment of a north–south trade corridor. The proposed agreement will provide facilities to Tajikistan to use Pakistan's ports and the Wagah Border for its imports and exports while Pakistan would be granted rights to transit goods across Tajik territory to Kyrgyzstan and Uzbekistan.

In April 2015, Afghanistan's president Ashraf Ghani announced that Tajikistan cannot be included in the trade agreement until Indian goods are offered the right to export goods to Afghanistan across Pakistani territory, which is in direct contradiction of Articles 5 and 52 of the signed Agreement which specifically forbids Indian goods and transporters this right.

== Alternative route for Pakistan to Central Asia ==
In April 2015, China and Pakistan agreed to construct various infrastructure projects worth approximately $46 billion under the China-Pakistan Economic Corridor, which is part of China's ambitious proposed 21st century Silk Road initiative. Projects currently under construction include the a system of motorways and upgraded roads from the Pakistani coastal cities of Karachi and Gwadar, all the way to the Chinese border and onwards to Kashgar in China's Xinjiang province. From Kashgar, transport links to Kyrgyzstan and Kazakhstan have been upgraded, while seasonal road access to Tajikistan is provided by the Pamir Highway. Upgrading of Pakistan's roadway network is under way, and will allow Pakistan access to those states via China rather than Afghanistan by 2020.

The Pakistani government continued to be frustrated by Afghanistan's refusal to allow Pakistani goods access to Central Asian markets until Afghan exports were granted reciprocal access to Indian markets. Owing to this frustration, and ongoing construction of roadway projects to China under the China-Pakistan Economic Corridor, the Pakistani Government in February 2016 signalled its intention to completely bypass Afghanistan in its quest to access Central Asia by announcing its intent to revive the Quadrilateral Traffic in Transit Agreement so that Central Asian states could access Pakistani ports via Kashgar instead of Afghanistan, thereby allowing the Central Asian republics to access Pakistan's deep water ports without having to rely on a politically unstable Afghanistan as a transit corridor. However, the QTTA would not allow Pakistan access to Turkmenistan and Iran across Afghan territory as the APTTA does.

In early March 2016, the Afghan government reportedly acquiesced to Pakistani requests to use Afghanistan as a corridor to Tajikistan, after having dropped demands from reciprocal access to India via Pakistan. The revised transit trade agreement is expected to be signed by April 2016.

== Afghanistan pullout ==
On 23 October 2017, the President of Afghanistan Ashraf Ghani announced that "The Afghanistan and Pakistan Trade Agreement (APTA) has expired" and issued a decree banning Pakistani trucks from entering the country via the Torkham and Spin Boldak border crossings, TOLOnews reported.

== See also ==
- Quadrilateral Traffic in Transit Agreement
- Khyber Pass Economic Corridor
