= Central Asia Regional Economic Cooperation Program =

Asian Development Bank program

Central Asia Regional Economic Cooperation (CAREC) Program
- Type: Economic corridor
- Founded: 1997; 29 years ago
- Headquarters: Mandaluyong, Metro Manila, Philippines
- Area served: Afghanistan, Azerbaijan, People’s Republic of China, Georgia, Kazakhstan, Kyrgyz Republic, Mongolia, Pakistan, Tajikistan, Turkmenistan, and Uzbekistan
- Parent: Asian Development Bank
- Website: www.carecprogram.org

The Central Asia Regional Economic Cooperation (CAREC) Program is a program established in 1997 by the Asian Development Bank (ADB) to encourage economic cooperation among countries in Central Asia and nearby parts of Transcaucasia and South Asia.

== CAREC Member countries ==
CAREC Members

The 11 CAREC Member countries are:

- Afghanistan
- Azerbaijan
- China
- Georgia
- Kazakhstan
- Kyrgyz Republic
- Mongolia
- Pakistan
- Tajikistan
- Turkmenistan
- Uzbekistan

== Multilateral Institution Partners ==
CAREC has seven multilateral institutions partners:

- Asian Development Bank (ADB). ADB serves as the CAREC Secretariat.
- Asian Infrastructure Investment Bank (AIIB)
- European Bank for Reconstruction and Development (EBRD)
- International Monetary Fund (IMF)
- Islamic Development Bank (IsDB)
- United Nations Development Programme (UNDP)
- World Bank

== Ministerial Conferences ==
CAREC holds an annual ministerial conference.

- 2011 – Baku, Azerbaijan
- 2012 – Wuhan, People's Republic of China
- 2013 – Astana, Kazakhstan
- 2014 – Bishkek, Kyrgyz Republic
- 2015 – Ulaanbaatar, Mongolia
- 2016 – Islamabad, Pakistan
- 2017 – Dushanbe, Tajikistan
- 2018 - Ashgabat, Turkmenistan
- 2019 - Tashkent, Uzbekistan
- 2020 - Virtual Meeting
- 2021 - Virtual Meeting
- 2022 - Virtual Meeting
- 2023 - Tbilisi, Georgia

== See also ==
- Quadrilateral Traffic in Transit Agreement
- Khyber Pass Economic Corridor
