= Quadrilateral Traffic in Transit Agreement =

Trade agreement among four Asian countries

The Quadrilateral Traffic in Transit Agreement (QTTA) (Urdu: معاہدہِ چار طرفہ ٹریفک گذرگاہ) is a transit trade deal between China, Pakistan, Kyrgyzstan and Kazakhstan for facilitating transit traffic and trade. In February 2017, Tajikistan expressed interest in joining the deal. A similar desire to join the agreement was expressed by Uzbekistan in May 2020. The initial work on this road project was initiated in 1995.

The road project is related to the China Pakistan Economic Corridor, which aims to provide China and Central Asia access to Pakistani ports. After the development of Gawadar Port in Balochistan province of Pakistan, development of this route became more lucrative particularly for Kyrgyzstan and Kazakhstan. For Pakistan its importance has recently increased following frequent border closures with Afghanistan over political hostilities and security issues.

== Strategic implications ==
The strategical importance of this project was reduced when Afghanistan offered Pakistan access to Central Asia via the Afghanistan–Pakistan Transit Trade Agreement. The QTTA provides Pakistan an alternative gateway to Central Asia by completely circumventing Afghanistan. It would use the Karakoram Highway which connects Gilgit-Baltistan to China's Xinjiang region, which links to Central Asia.

== See also ==
- China–Pakistan Economic Corridor
- Khyber Pass Economic Corridor
- Afghanistan–Pakistan Transit Trade Agreement
