= Volkart Brothers =

Swiss merchant company, 1851 to 1989

- Volkart Brothers label used in the 1900s
- Native name: Gebrüder Volkart
- Founded: February 1, 1851; 175 years ago in Winterthur, Switzerland and Bombay, India
- Defunct: 1989
- Successor: Volkart Foundation; Paul Reinhart Ltd.
- Owner: Volkart Holding Ltd. (Reinhart family)
- Number of employees: 7,600+ (1926)
- Website: volkart.ch

Volkart Brothers (German: Gebrüder Volkart) colloquially Volkart Brothers Importers was a Swiss merchant company headquartered in Winterthur, Switzerland primarily trading in colonial goods and cotton. Volkart was the fourth largest cotton merchant in the world, until its dissolution in 1989. Later the merchant activities merged into Paul Reinhart Ltd. Since 1951 there is the Volkart Foundation which retains the family name to this day.

Founded in 1851, the company initially had offices in Winterthur and Bombay, Indian Empire. There were subsidiaries in Colombo (1857), Cochin (1859), Karachi (1861) and London (1868). At its peak in 1926 it employed 7,600+ people worldwide.

== History ==
Two years after the repeal of the Navigation Acts for India, on February 1, 1851, the partnership Gebrüder Volkart was founded in Winterthur and Bombay by Salomon Volkart and his brother Johann Georg Volkart. The trading company imported colonial goods like cotton, tea, oils, coffee, cocoa, spices, rubber, and other colonial products from India, exporting soap, paper, matches, watches, textiles, machinery, and other industrial goods in return. The business flourished, expanding to Colombo (1857), Cochin (1859), and Karachi (1861). In 1859, Villa Wehntal, became the headquarters of the firm in Winterthur prior to moving into the Noetzlihaus in 1864.

When Johann Georg Volkart unexpectedly died in 1861, Salomon Volkart continued the business with non-family partners. This period saw the establishment of a subsidiary in London (1868). Due to political and economic challenges, frequent changes in leadership, and his declining health, Salomon Volkart withdrew from active business in 1875, remaining a silent partner until his death in 1893. The headquarters relocated again in 1879 to the former Bank in Winterthur building. In 1905, the company built its first administrative building, the Volkart-Haus, near Winterthur's main train station.

Through the marriage of Lilly Volkart (1855–1916) to Theodor Reinhart, the business passed to the Reinhart family in 1912, who still oversee its operations today. By 1926, the company had 80 branches in India, making it Switzerland's primary representative there. The headquarters moved once more to Gebrüder Volkart building at St. Georgenplatz 2, near the station. The leadership returned to the Volkart-Haus in 1955. The sons of Theodor, Georg, and Werner, later joined the company, continuing their father's philanthropic efforts.

== Mergers ==
In 1985, Andreas Reinhart took over the company, initiating an ambitious investment strategy that ultimately weakened the company. The company sold its coffee business to the Erb Group in 1989, operating under the name Volcafe thereafter. Until 1999, it was the world's fourth-largest cotton trader. The company also held a majority stake in the Suhrkamp Verlag until 1999.

== Recent activity ==
Today, Volkart's website only mentions its various foundations; the former trading giant is no longer active in business, apart from several investments.
