= Shirin Tagab River =

River in Faryab Province, Afghanistan

Shirin Tagab
- Mouth location

Location
- Country: Afghanistan
- Province: Faryab

Physical characteristics
- Source: Runoff
  - location: Eastern Bilchiragh District
  - coordinates: 35.93°N 65.65°E
  - elevation: 1,800 m (5,900 ft)
- Mouth: Inland Delta
  - location: Area surrounding Andkhoy
  - coordinates: 36°57′N 65°07′E
  - elevation: 300 m (980 ft)
- Length: 320 km (200 mi)
- Basin size: 13,600 km^{2} (5,300 mi^{2})
- Discharge
  - location: Khisht Pu
  - average: 4,450 L/s (157 cu ft/s)
- Discharge
  - location: Dawlatabad
  - average: 2,340 L/s (83 cu ft/s)
- Discharge
  - location: Pata Baba (371 m)
  - average: 3,980 L/s (141 cu ft/s)

Basin features
- Tributaries
  - left: Chashma-i Khwab, Shor Darya
  - right: Astana

The Shirin Tagab River is a river in Afghanistan, which travels 320 kilometres (200 mi) before ending in an inland delta around Andkhoi. The river's watershed has 504 settlements with a population of 605,972, and covers the majority of Faryab Province. Downstream, the river is brackish/saltwater. In addition, the river is a source of water-borne diseases.

== Course ==
The river begins flowing west in the eastern part of Bilchiragh District, and is joined by the river Chashma-i Khwab near the district center, after the Chashma has flowed through scenic rapids. The Tagab then turns north, flowing through the northeast corner of Pashtun Kot District and western Khwaja Sabz Posh District. As it enters Shirin Tagab District, the river is joined by the Astana river. At Araba, an irrigation canal takes the majority of the river's water. Then, near Pata Baba in Dawlat Abad District, it is joined by the Shor Darya River, which carries the water from the Almar, Qaysar, and Maimana rivers. The Shirin Tagab then dissipates around the city of Andkhoy, on the edge of the Dasht-i Shortepa.

The river used to run to the Amu Darya before the development of irrigation and the diversion of water.

== Economy ==
Most of the river's water is used for irrigation. Sometimes, the large amount of water being diverted leaves the natural waterway nearly dry; little water reaches Andkhoy in the summer months.

About 1,000 square kilometres (390 sq mi) of its watershed is cultivated, and another 6,000 serving as rangeland.
