= Qurchi =

- Town
- Location in Afghanistan
- Coordinates: 35°54′37″N 65°35′29″E
- Country: Afghanistan
- Province: Faryab Province
- District: Bilchiragh District
- Time zone: + 4.30

Qurchi, also Kypim, is a major town in Bilchiragh District in the Faryab Province, in northern Afghanistan. It lies west of Negala. The town has a significant Uzbek population.

== History ==
The town was occupied by Maimana officers in 1888.

Norwegian soldiers were attacked in Qurchi in July 2010.
