= Trond André Bolle =

Norwegian military officer

- Born: Trond André Bolle; 5 July 1968; Vestby, Akershus, Norway
- Died: 27 June 2010 (aged 41); Almar, Faryab Province, Afghanistan
- Burial place: Hoff Church, Østre Toten, Norway
- Military career
- Allegiance: Norway
- Branch: Military Special Forces Branch
- Service years: 1989-2010
- Rank: Lieutenant Commander (Orlogskaptein)
- Unit: Marinejegerkommandoen
- Conflicts: Yugoslav Wars; Kosovo War; War in Afghanistan (2001-14)
- Awards: War Cross with Sword (awarded posthumously)

Trond André Bolle (5 July 1968 – 27 June 2010) was a Norwegian military officer and a commando of Marinejegerkommandoen (English: Norwegian Navy Special Operations Command, NORNAVSOC), with the rank of orlogskaptein. He was awarded the War Cross.

== Career ==
Commander Bolle was awarded the War Cross with Sword (posthumously) on 21 January 2011. The decision was announced by the Minister of Defence, Grete Faremo, shortly after the cabinet session the same day. Cmdr. Bolle receives the award for his actions and behaviour during his command of the Norwegian Special Operations Force Task Group II in support of Operation Enduring Freedom in Afghanistan's Helmand province from October 2005 to February 2006. According to the Minister of Defence, Cmdr Bolle performed "above and beyond the call of duty" on numerous occasions during this period, his leadership was described as "exemplary".

He "was a part" of intelligence agency E 14.

=== Transport of children out of Morocco ===
He and three other former members of E14 (an intelligence organization), smuggled the two children of Khalid Skah and Cecilie Hopstock out of Morocco, in 2009.

== Death ==
Commander Trond André Bolle was killed on 27 June 2010, in an IED incident in Afghanistan's Faryab province. Three other ISAF-soldiers from Norway were also killed in the incident, which happened on the road between Khwaja Gawhar and Almar Bazar. The vehicle was the last vehicle in a column of four vehicles. This award marks the first award of the War Cross with Sword for actions performed after the end of World War II. The award was presented on Veterans day (also Victory in Europe Day), 8 May 2011.
