= Ghormach District =

Ghormach District غورماچ
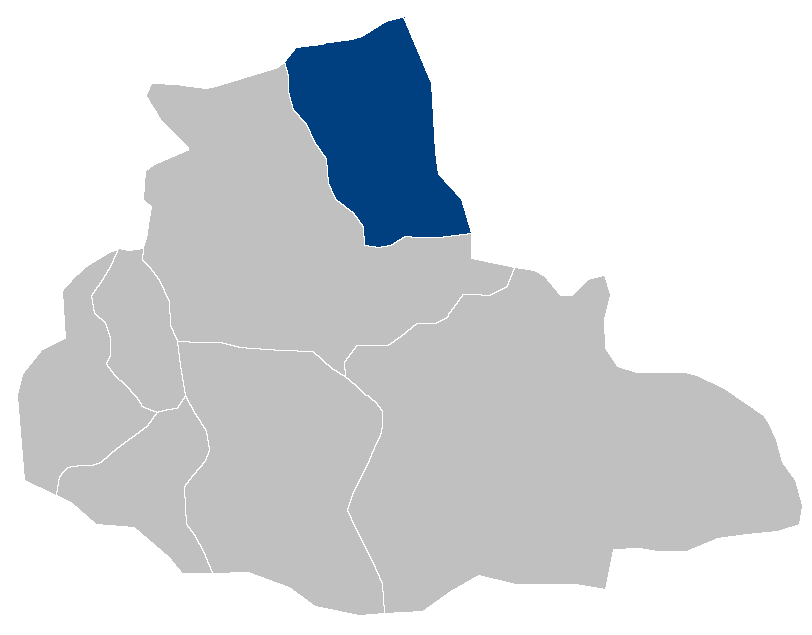
- The location of the Ghormach District in Badghis Province, Afghanistan

- Location in Afghanistan
- Coordinates: 35°43′32″N 63°47′22″E
- Country: Afghanistan
- Province: Badghis Province
- Seat: Ghormach

Area
  - Total: 804 sq mi (2,083 km^{2})

Population (2003)
  - Total: 52,566

Ghormach (Pashto: ولسوالی غورماچ) is a district situated in the north of Badghis Province, Afghanistan. The district centre is Ghormach.

== Demographics ==
The estimated population of Ghormach District in 2003 was roughly 52,566. Based upon the Ministry of Rural Rehabilitation and Development of Afghanistan's (MRRD) district profile for Ghormach, Pashtuns made up 97% of the total population, followed by 2% Aimaqs and 1% Baloch.

In 2008, Ghormach District was transferred from Badghis to Faryab Province, but later it was transferred back to Badghis.

== Politics ==
Ghormach district experienced a resurgence in poppy cultivation after the fall of the Taliban government in 2001, although the Karzai government's eradication program had made some headway by spring 2007.

Moalem Nooruddin was the chief district officer in 2007 when he was believed to have been captured by the Taliban on 16 December 2007. Other district leaders include Abdullah Jan and as of July 2010 Qari Dalat. As of 2007 much of Ghormach District was under Taliban control.

Taliban captured the district on 11 October 2016.

== Geography ==
Ghormach district has 100 villages which covers an area of 2,083 km^{2}. Murghab is surrounded by Turkmenistan, Bala Murghab of Badghis Province, Almar and Qaysar districts of neighbouring Faryab Province.

Notable localities in this district include Ab-i-Garmak, Arzanak, Du Abi, Garband, Husayn, Joy-i-Shor, Karez, Khatun, Khushki, Pamakhtu, Petaw, Rangin, Rashid, Sartakit, Sawriwon, Senjetak and Sharshari.

== Education ==
There is 1 high school, 2 secondary schools and 13 primary schools in the district.
