= Maimana Khanate =

Uzbek Khanate around Maimana, Afghanistan

Maimana Khanate خانات میمنه (Persian)
- 1747–1892
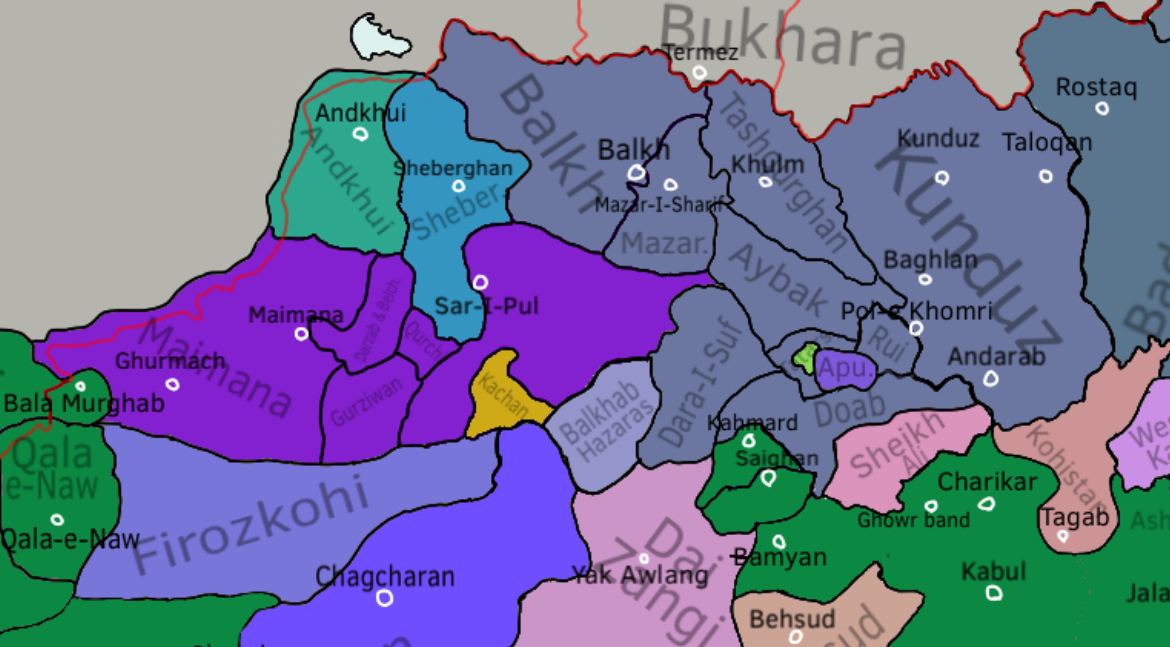
- Map of the Maimana Khanate (purple) in 1751, in Afghan Turkestan.
- Capital: Maymana
- Common languages: Persian; Uzbek (lingua franca, language of commerce)
- Ethnic groups: Uzbeks; Arabs; Hazaras; Baluch people
- History
  - Established: 1747
  - Disestablished: 1892
Preceded by	Succeeded by
Afsharid Iran	Emirate of Afghanistan
- Today part of: Afghanistan

The Maimana Khanate (Persian: خانات میمنه, Uzbek: میمنه خانلیغی) was an Uzbek Khanate in Northern Afghanistan centered around the town of Maimana. It was founded in 1747 with the death of Nader Shah. The Mings had been the governors of Maimana since 1621. Hajji Bi Ming was the first independent ruler of the khanate. After the death of Ahmad Khan in 1814, Sar-i Pul seceded from the khanate. In the 1830s Sar-i Pul took the district of Gurziwan from Maimana. The Aimaq tribes of the Murghab broke away from Maimana by 1845. In 1847 and 1850 it resisted attempts by the Emirate of Herat to annex it. In 1875 the khanate rebelled against Afghanistan but it was crushed and the city sacked. In 1892 the khanate was annexed by Afghanistan.

== History ==
=== Invasion by Yar Mohammad Khan ===
In 1844, the rulers of the Chahar Wilayat broke out into open war again. Mizrab Khan of Maimana and Rustam Khan of Sheberghan mounted a joint attack on the new ruler of Andkhui, Ghazanfar Khan. Ghazanfar was overthrown and his uncle, Sufi Khan, was installed as the new ruler. Ghazanfar fled to Bukhara and agreed to pay tribute if Nasrullah Khan would restore him to the throne of Andkhui. Nasrullah agreed and sent Ghazanfar to the Mir Wali of Khulm (who was an ally of Bukhara). Mir Wali was eager to settle old scores. Aided by the Ishans of Balkh and Mazar-i Sharif, Mir Wali marched into the Chahar Wilayat. Sar-i Pul defected and attacked Shebarghan. Rustam Khan requested help from Mizrab Khan, however, in early 1845, Mizrab Khan died after he was poisoned by one of his wives. As a result, his two sons (Hukumat Khan and Sher Mohammad Khan) not only made a truce with each other but also supported Bukhara's invasion. Therefore, Shebarghan was annexed by Sar-I Pul and Ghazanfar Khan was re-instated as the ruler of Andkhui. However, Ghazanfar refused to pay tribute to Bukhara and as a result Nasrullah supported Rustam Khan in recapturing Sherbarghan and deposing Ghazanfar Khan (once more re-instating Sufi Khan as head of the Andkhui Afshars).

At the same time, the truce between Hukumat Khan and Sher Mohammad Khan broke down and the two fought for control of Maimana. Yar Mohammad Khan intervened and temporarily settled the dispute. Sher Mohammad was given control of Maimana while Hukumat Khan would control agriculture and mercantile trade, effectively becoming Sher Mohammad's diwanbegi. In addition to this, Yar Mohammad also attempted to create two Tajik battalions in the hopes that they would be more loyal to Herat.

In the Summer of 1847, Hukumat Khan requested assistance against Sher Mohammad Khan, becoming the pretext for war Yar Mohammad needed. Yar Mohammad marched against Maimana with 20,000 troops (half of those being composed of Aimaq and Turkmen tribesmen eager for loot). When the army reached Chichaktu (on the frontier between Herat and Maimana), it quickly fell and the town was sacked. When Hukumat Khan heard of this, he quickly rushed to tender his submission and provided the army with supplies, preventing the Heratis from doing the same to other regions of Maimana. Yar Mohammad also punished the looters by amputating their noses and ears even though it was quite obvious he had sanctioned the sacking.

They soon marched on Sher Mohammad Khan's stronghold of Khairabad and the fortress was torn apart. Sher Mohammad initially fled and eventually reconciled with his brother. Ghazanfar Khan of Andkhui also requested Yar Mohammad Khan's aid in overthrowing Sufi Khan. Sufi Khan was put to death and Andkhui was subjected to a brutal sacking. Yar Mohammad intended to continue his advance to Aqcha and Balkh even though it was in the winter. He swiftly occupied Aqcha but failed to take Sheberghan and was forced to retreat to Maimana. The population refused to open their gates, so Hukumat Khan guided the army through a route going around the capital. The march back to Bala Morghab was devastating and many Herati soldiers died due to the cold or hunger. Yar Mohammad Khan returned to Herat in late February or Early March 1848, and attempted to recover from the defeat.

In November 1849, Yar Mohammad demanded Hukumat Khan to pay tribute to Herat. When this offer was refused, Maimana was besieged with a force of 6,000 men and the city was surrounded for 11 months. However, Maimana continued to hold out and it was detrimental to Herat's future as an independent state. In 1849 and 1850, the Barakzais had already incorporated significant parts of Afghan Turkestan into their kingdom, and if all of the region was to fall then Herat could be simultaneously attacked from Maimana and Qandahar. The siege of Maimana also helped the Barakzais because it made sure that Maimana's powerful army wouldn't come to the aid of the petty states of the region. Eventually, in September 1850, the siege of Maimana was lifted and Yar Mohammad Khan returned in defeat to Herat.

== Territory Administration ==
By 1888, Maimana's territory had been greatly reduced. The area of Daulatabad, serving as an important defense along the borders of Andkhui, had been seized by the Afghan administration and given to Aqcha. Darzab and Gurziwan had also been lost, becoming administered from Sar-i Pul.

In 1888, Maimana was divided into 8 districts:

1. Maimana میمنه
2. Namusa va Langar ناموسا و لنگر
3. Almar المار
4. Karai کری
5. Qaisar قیصار
6. Chichaktu چیچکتو
7. Shirin Tagao شیرین تگاب
8. Khairabad خیرآباد

The breakdown of each individual district can be found below.

=== Maimana district ===
Villages of the Maimana District
Village ده	Ethnic composition	Population (families)
Maimana میمنه	Mostly Uzbeks	4,000 houses
Tailan valley	Mostly Uzbek	770 families (total)
Tailan تیلان	Shah Kamani Uzbeks	60
Haoz-i Amir Bai حوض امیر بای	Shah Kamani Uzbeks	120
Sang-i Zard سنگ زرد	Shah Kamani Uzbeks	15
Aq Darra آق دره	Shah Kamani Uzbeks	40
Deh-i Pir Khisht ده پیر خشت	Khwajas and Firozkohis	60
Aq Chashmah (Note: Coordinates: 35-?N 64-?E according to page 48 of the Gazetteer) آق چشمه	Shah Kamani Uzbeks	20
Bai Mukhli (Mughuli) بای مخلی (مغلی)	Sungh Ali Uzbeks	80
Chahartut چهارتوت	Sungh Ali Uzbeks	20
Dahan-i Darra (Qal'ah-yi Niyaz Beg) دهان دره (قلعه نیاز بیگ)	Uzbeks and Arabs	30
Kusht-i Girma کشت گرمه	Allakah Uzbeks	40
Shah Folad شاه فولاد	Shah Kamani Uzbeks	40
Unchelad اونچلاد	Baluch	70
Gurziwani (Note: Coordinates: 35-?N 64-?E according to page 231 of the Gazetteer) گرزیوانی	Gurziwani Uzbeks	60
Jam Shiri جمشیری	Jamshiri Uzbeks	30
Kotal Gumai (Note: Coordinates: 35-?N 64-?E according to page 366 of the Gazetteer) کوتل گمی	Kotari Uzbeks	55
Toghachi (Note: Coordinates: 35-?N 64-?E according to page 579 of the Gazetteer) توغچی	Toghachi Uzbeks	30
Namusa Tagao ناموسا تگاو	Mixed	315 families (total)
Bibi A'ineh بی بی آئینه	Sartarash Arabs	30
Torpakhtu تورپاختو	Surkhabi (Hazaras?)	30
Muzi (Note: Coordinates: 36-?N 64-?E according to page 424 of the Gazetteer) موزی	Muzi Uzbeks	60
Kaush Khel (Note: Coordinates: 36-?N 64-?E according to page 318 of the Gazetteer) کاوش‌خیل	Kaush Uzbeks	40
Sar Bulaq سر بولاق	Bazari Uzbeks	70
Takatuzi تکتزی	Baimaqli	30
Bad Qaq باد قاق	Salor Turkmen (Begi Sarkar section)	55
Darra Sel and Agha Lara	Mixed	280 families (total)
Aqsai آق‌ سی	Uzbeks and Arabs	50
Omakhai (Note: Coordinates: 36-2N 66-38E according to page 432 of the gazetteer.) اومخی	Sadullai Firozkohis	30
Mir Shikar میر شکر	Uzbeks and Firozkohis	200

=== Namusa va Langar district ===
Villages of the Namusa va Langar district
Village	Ethnic Composition	Population
Namusa	Solely Baluch	144 families (total)
Bai Ghesi بای غسی	Baluch	10
Gadai Qal'ah گدای قلعه	Baluch	40
Imarat عمارت	Baluch	14
Katta Qal'ah کته قلعه	Baluch	12
Qunjagh 'Ali قنجغ علی	Baluch	11
Shah Nazar شاه نظر	Baluch	7
Uima Qal'ah اویمه قلعه	Baluch	38
Gulnabad گلون‌آباد	Baluch	12
Langar	Mostly Baluch	99 families (total)
Chim Qal'ah چیم قلعه	Baluch	20
Aq Mazar (Note: Coordinates: 36-1N 64-29E according to page 52 of the Gazetteer.) آق مزار	Baighazi Uzbeks	12
Qasabah Qal'ah قصبه قلعه	Baluch	25
Khwaja Qul خواجه قل	Baluch	12?
Mingdarakht منگ درخت	Baluch	30

=== Almar district ===
Villages of the Almar District
Villages	Ethnic composition	Population (families)
Qarah Quli قره قلی	Allach Uzbeks	45
Ituraq ایتوراق	Allach Uzbeks	50
Qilichli قلیچلی	Qilichi Allach Uzbeks	40
Jilgildah جلگلده	Jilgildi Allach Uzbeks	50
Qarah Quli (2nd)	Qarah Quli Allach Uzbeks	80
Surf 'Ali صرف‌علی	Surf 'Ali Allach Uzbeks	30
Qarah Tanak قره تنک	Qarah Tanak Allach Uzbeks	55
Akhund Baba آخوند بابا	Khwajas	35
Noghai-yi Bala نوغی بالا	Noghai Allach Uzbeks	30
Khudai Mad	Khudai Mad Allach Uzbeks	70
Chaghatai چغتای	Chaghatai Allach Uzbeks	70
Noghai-yi Pa'in نوغی پائین	Noghai Allach Uzbeks	40
Baighazi (Note: Coordinates: 35-?N 64-?E, according to page 93 of the Gazetteer.) بای‌غازی	Baighazi Allach Uzbeks	50
Bukhara Qal'ah بخارا قلعه	Bukharan Uzbeks	60
Qal'ah-yi Niyaz Atal قلعه نیاز اتال	Khudai Mad Allach Uzbeks	20
Diwanah Khanah دیوانه خانه	Mixed Allach Uzbeks	40

=== Karai ===
This district was inhabited by the Karais, a tribe of Qara Qipchaq origin. They were the large flock-owners of Maimana, and were able to protect their flocks from Turkmen raids by retreating to the hills. By 1888, they had largely assimilated into the Uzbek population.

Villages of the Karai district
Village	Ethnic composition	Population (families)
Gaojan	Mostly Karais	270 families
Qishlaq-i 'Aqil قشلاق عقیل	Khalifa Karais	100
Another Mohalla near Farhad Beg	Karais	50
Dewanah Khanah دیوانه خانه	Karais	40
Qishlaq-i Ata Murad قشلاق آتا مراد	Khwajas	20
Qishlaq-i Farhad Beg قشلاق فرهاد بیگ	Karais	60
Parakhaman	All Karais	325 families
1st Mohalla محله یکم	Karais	65
2nd Mohalla محله دوم	Karais	85
3rd Mohalla محله سوم	Karais	70
4th Mohalla محله چهارم	Karais	50
5th Mohalla محله پنجم	Karais	55

=== Qaisar district ===
Village	Ethnic composition	Population (families)
Tagao-i Karai	Mostly Karai	130 families
Qaisar proper	Mixed	370 families
Tangi-yi Pa'in تنگی پائین	Ungajit Uzbeks	40
Qishlaq-i Mirha قشلاق میرها	Mirs	30
Bori		70
Arzulak (Note: Coordinates: 33-?N 64-?E, according to page 85 of the Gazetteer) ارزولک	Surkhabi Hazaras	40
Kohi کوهی	Kohi Ungajit Uzbeks	25
Sar Asiab سر آسیاب	Khwajas	15
Mad Khwaja (Note: Coordinates: 35-?N 64-?E, according to page 377 of the Gazetteer) ماد خواجه	Haidari Ungajit Uzbeks	30
Za'faran زعفران	Khwajas	20
Sazai Kalan (Note: Coordinates: 35-?N 64-?E, according to page 522 of the Gazetteer) سازی کلان	Ungajit Uzbeks	20
Ghora غوره	Mixed	80
Hirah	Uzbeks and Khwajas	260 families
Five villages پنج ده	Mikrit Uzbeks	200
Khwajah Kenti خواجه کنتی	Khwajas	60

=== Khairabad district ===
Villages of the Khairabad district
Village	Ethnic composition	Population (families)
Top Khanah Qal'ah توپ خانه قلعه	Arghun Uzbeks	60
Khairabad خیرآباد	Arghun Uzbeks	200
Khuda-yi Mad خدای‌مد	Arghun Uzbeks	90
Total	Arghun Uzbeks	350

== Rulers ==
The following is a list of rulers of the Maimana Khanate according to Johnathan Lee's book.

- Ataliq Uraz Ming bin Baruti Bi (1612–30/1653–56)
- Hajji Bi Khan Ming (1731–1772)
- Jan Khan (1772–1795)
- In 1795 Jan Khan was briefly succeeded by his eldest son, however the name is not given.
- Muhammad Rahim Khan (1795–1804)
- Ataliq Ahmad Quli Khan (1804–1814)
- Ali Yar Khan (1814–1830)
- In 1830 an unnamed Persian regent governed the khanate before being deposed.
- Abd al-Mu'min Khan (1830–31)
- Mizrab Khan (1831–1845)
- Hukumat Khan and Sher Muhammad Khan (1845–48)
- Hukumat Khan (1845–1862)
- Muhammad Husain Khan bin Mizrab Khan (1862–March 1876)
- From March 1876 to February 1879 the Maimana Khanate was annexed into Afghanistan and Afghan governors were appointed.
- Muhammad Husain Khan (February–May 1879)
- From May to November 1879 the khanate was again annexed into Afghanistan.
- Between November 1879 and February 1880 there was a civil war in Maimana between the two main contenders to the throne: Dilawar Khan and Mohammad Husain Khan. eventually Dilawar Khan emerged victorious.
- Dilawar Khan (February 1880–21 May 1884)
- Muhammad Husain Khan bin Mizrab Khan (21 May 1884–88)
- In 1888 Maimana was under Herat due to the revolt of Sardar Ishaq Khan.
- Muhammad Sharif Khan (1889–1892)
