= Teylan =

- Village
- Location in Afghanistan
- Coordinates: 35°32′13″N 64°48′26″E
- Country: Afghanistan
- Province: Faryab Province
- District: Pashtun Kot District
- Time zone: + 4.30

Teylan is a village in Pashtun Kot District in the Faryab Province, in northern Afghanistan. It lies in a valley, south of Sar-e Howz.
