= Damla Mohibullah =

Afghan Taliban politician and military figure

Damla Mohibullah Mawafiq

Mayor of Maymana
- Incumbent
- Assumed office November 2021

Personal details
- Born: c. 1997 Maymana, Faryab Province, Afghanistan
- Party: Taliban
- Occupation: Politician, military figure
- Known for: Mayor of Maymana, top Taliban sniper

Damla Mohibullah Mawafiq (Pashto: داملا محب اللہ موافق) (Born circa 1997) is an Afghan Taliban politician and military figure who is currently serving as Mayor of Maymana, the capital of Faryab Province since November 2021. Mohibullah is known as one of the top snipers in the Taliban ranks.

== Biography ==
Mohibullah was reportedly born or grew up in Maymana, in 1997 (possibly 1996 (Note: He was 25 when he took office in Maymana, 25 years before his appointment in November 2021 was 1996, not 1997, which suggests the 1997 date may be from 25 years prior to the reporting in February of 2022, the discrepancy would be because the 25 age was reported the year before the publication, adding a phantom year of distance when there may not be one.)). Purportedly of Uzbek origin, he was born to a rich family of traders (sometimes listed as "businessmen") and did remarkably well in his education and at sports.

He had early aspirations of becoming a medical professional, but at age 19 joined the Taliban and rose from a soldier to become commander of a small band of forces which had been deployed to Faryab Province. He is regarded as one of the Taliban's best snipers. He also was reportedly "in charge" of a village by the name of Doraye Khoija Qoshre. Afterwards, he became mayor of Maymana in November 2021.
