= Andkhoy =

Andkhoy may refer to:

- Andkhoy District, a district in Faryab Province, Afghanistan
- Andkhoy (city), a city and the center of the above district in Faryab Province, Afghanistan
