= Andkhoy District =

Andkhoy اندخوی
- District
- Location of the district center.
- Coordinates: 36°57′N 65°07′E
- Country: Afghanistan
- Province: Faryab
- Capital: Andkhoy

Government
  - Chief: Sultan Mohammad Sanjer
  - Taliban Shadow Judge: Maulawi Aref

Area
  - Total: 381 km^{2} (147 sq mi)

Population (2016)
  - Total: 44,715
  - Density: 117/km^{2} (304/sq mi)
- Time zone: UTC+4:30 (Afghanistan Standard Time)

Andkhoy District (Dari: اندخوی) is a district in Faryab province, Afghanistan. The district center is the Andkhoy city, and there are a total of 81 villages in the district. Most people farm or raise livestock in the district. The district is considered to be government-influenced, as opposed to the Taliban.

== Geography ==
AH76 connects this district to the provincial capital of Maymana and the capital of Jowzjan province, Sheberghan, among other places. However, the road from Maymana to Andkhoy is currently contested by an armed group, affecting the people. The road is considered one of the worst in Afghanistan. The Shirin Tagab River flows through the district.

=== Location ===
The district is surrounded by five other districts: Khani Chahar Bagh, Khwaja Du Koh, Dawlatabad, Qaramqol, and Qurghan. Khwaja Du Koh is located in Jowzjan Province. The district used to border Turkmenistan.

== Economy ==
Most people are engaged in agriculture and livestock activities. The main crops are wheat, barley, maize and potatoes. There is a lack of irrigation systems, fertilizers, pesticides, and a trade center.

There is also a rug-and-carpet industry, leather factories, tailoring, and embroidery.

== Education, Healthcare, and Government ==
There are 11 schools in the district, but they are underfunded, underskilled, understaffed, and undersupplied.

The district has health centers, pharmacies, and a 20-bed hospital, but there is a lack of ambulances and trained doctors.

The Afghan Government has strong control over the area, so most people use that judicial system. However, the Taliban government still appointed a shadow judge. There is also widespread corruption among government officials in Andkhoy.
