= Qurghan District =

Qurghan قرغان
- District
- Location within Afghanistan
- Coordinates: 37°02′N 64°56′E
- Country: Afghanistan
- Province: Faryab

Area
  - Total: 797 km^{2} (308 sq mi)

Population (2017)
  - Total: 27,116

Qurghan (Dari: قرغان) is a district in Faryab province, Afghanistan. It was created in 2005 from the western part of Andkhoy District. The district center Qurghan is very close to Andkhoy at 317 m altitude.

The district covers 797 square kilometres (308 sq mi) and has 13 villages. As of 2003, the population is 27,116.
