= Ghormach =

Ghormach غورماچ
- Location in Afghanistan
- Coordinates: 35°43′32″N 63°47′22″E
- Country: Afghanistan
- Province: Badghis Province
- District: Ghormach District
- Elevation: 2,170 ft (660 m)
- Time zone: + 4.30

Ghormach (Pashto: غورماچ) or Ghowrmach is a town in Badghis Province in northwestern Afghanistan. It serves as the center of Ghormach District.

== Climate ==
With a mild and generally warm and temperate climate, Ghormach features a hot-summer Mediterranean climate (Csa) under the Köppen climate classification. The average temperature in Ghormach is 14.9 °C (58.8 °F), while the annual precipitation averages 356 mm (14.0 in). August is the driest month with no rainfall, while March, the wettest month, has an average precipitation of 85 mm (3.3 in).

July is the hottest month of the year with an average temperature of 27.0 °C (80.6 °F). The coldest month January has an average temperature of 2.7 °C (36.9 °F).

Climate data for Ghormach
Month	Jan	Feb	Mar	Apr	May	Jun	Jul	Aug	Sep	Oct	Nov	Dec	Year
Mean daily maximum °C (°F)	7.8 (46.0)	8.8 (47.8)	14.8 (58.6)	21.0 (69.8)	27.4 (81.3)	33.7 (92.7)	35.7 (96.3)	34.1 (93.4)	29.4 (84.9)	22.8 (73.0)	16.1 (61.0)	10.5 (50.9)	21.8 (71.3)
Daily mean °C (°F)	2.7 (36.9)	4.5 (40.1)	9.6 (49.3)	15.0 (59.0)	19.6 (67.3)	24.8 (76.6)	27.0 (80.6)	25.4 (77.7)	20.4 (68.7)	14.8 (58.6)	9.5 (49.1)	5.2 (41.4)	14.9 (58.8)
Mean daily minimum °C (°F)	−2.3 (27.9)	0.2 (32.4)	4.4 (39.9)	9.0 (48.2)	11.8 (53.2)	15.9 (60.6)	18.3 (64.9)	16.8 (62.2)	11.5 (52.7)	6.8 (44.2)	2.9 (37.2)	0.0 (32.0)	7.9 (46.3)
Source: Climate-Data.org

== Armed conflict ==
An International Security Assistance Force (ISAF) soldier (a Norwegian national) was killed in Ghormach on January 25, 2010.
