= Khwaja Sabz Posh District =

Khwaja Sabz Posh خواجه سبزپوش
- District
- Location within Afghanistan
- Coordinates: 36°04′N 64°58′E
- Country: Afghanistan
- Province: Faryab

Area
  - Total: 800 km^{2} (310 sq mi)

Population (2013)
  - Total: 55,000

Khwaja Sabz Posh (Dari: خواجه سبزپوش) is the district where the Faryab province capital Maymana is located. It is a rural district without its own capital. The Khwaja Sabz Posh district is the closest district to the north of Maymana city. Khoja Sabz Posh is the name of a deceased village elder who was famous for always wearing the color green. There is a shrine dedicated to him on a hilltop just north of the Bazaar. It contains 85 villages. Ethnic diversity includes 80% Uzbek, 10% Pashtun and 10% Tajik.

From 24 April and 7 May 2014, flash flooding from heavy rainfall resulted in the destruction of public facilities, roads, and agricultural land. Within the cluster of villages of Badghisi, Khoja Qoshri, Murcha Ghal, Dehnaw, Ghuzzari, Yangi Qala, Kosa Qala, and Sarai Qala, 371 families were severely affected and one person was reportedly killed.
