= Hectare =

Metric unit of area

hectare
- A visualisation of one hectare

General information
- Unit system: Non-SI units mentioned in the SI
- Unit of: Area
- Symbol: ha

Conversions
1 ha in ...	... is equal to ...
- SI base units: 10^{4} m^{2}
- Imperial and US customary units: 11960 yd^{2} 2.4711 acres

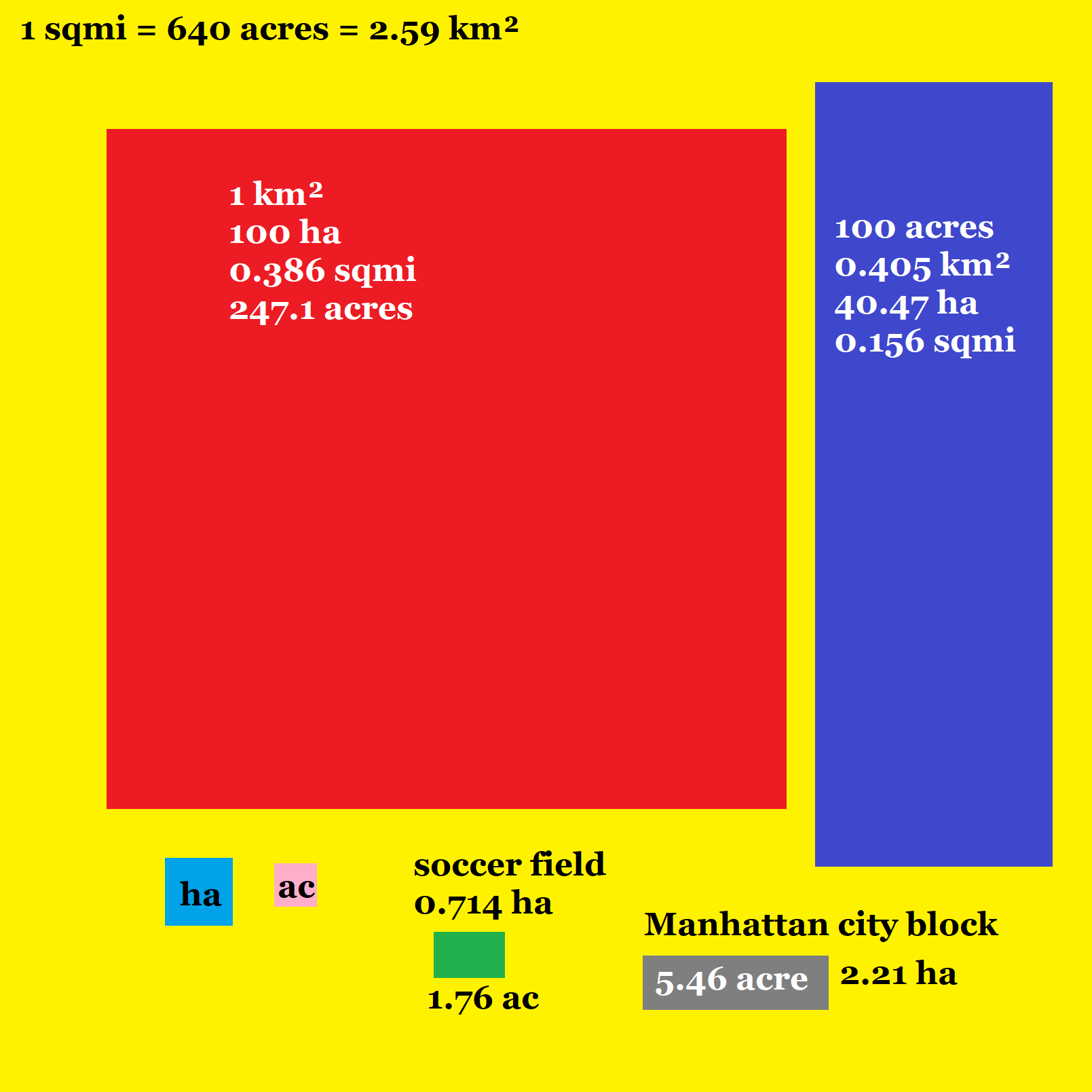
Image comparing the hectare (the small blue area at lower left) to other units. The entire yellow square is one square mile.

The hectare (/ˈhɛktɛər, -tɑːr/; SI symbol: ha) is a non-SI metric unit of area equal to a square with 100-metre sides, that is, 10,000 square metres (10,000 m^{2}), and is primarily used in the measurement of land. There are 100 hectares in one square kilometre. An acre is about 0.405 hectares and thus one hectare is about 2.47 acres.

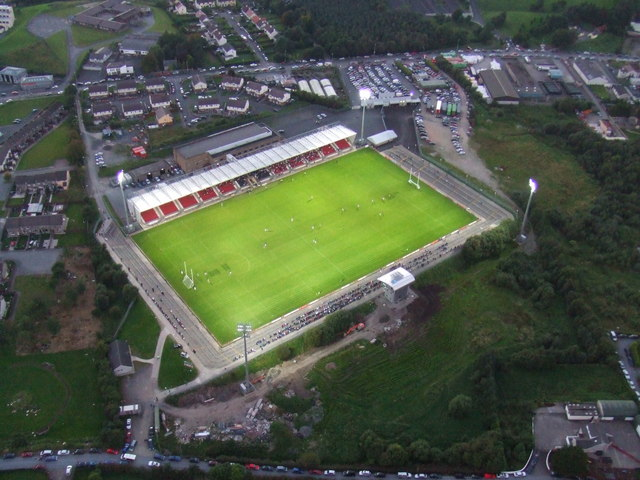
St. Enda's GAA ground, in Omagh. The playing field used in Gaelic football and hurling is a little over a hectare in size.

In 1795, when the metric system was introduced, the are was defined as 100 square metres, or one square decametre, and the hectare ("hecto-" + "are") was thus 100 ares. When the metric system was further rationalised in 1960, resulting in the International System of Units (SI), the are was not included as a recognised unit, and from 2026 the hectare is no longer described by the International Bureau of Weights and Measures (BIPM) as accepted for use with the SI.

== Description ==
Comparison of area units
Unit	SI
1 ca	1 m^{2}
1 a	100 m^{2}
1 ha	10,000 m^{2}
100 ha	1000000 m^{2} 1 km^{2}
non-SI comparisons
non-SI	metric
0.3861 sq mi	1 km^{2}
2.471 acre	1 ha
107639 sq ft	1 ha
1 sq mi	259.0 ha
1 acre	0.4047 ha

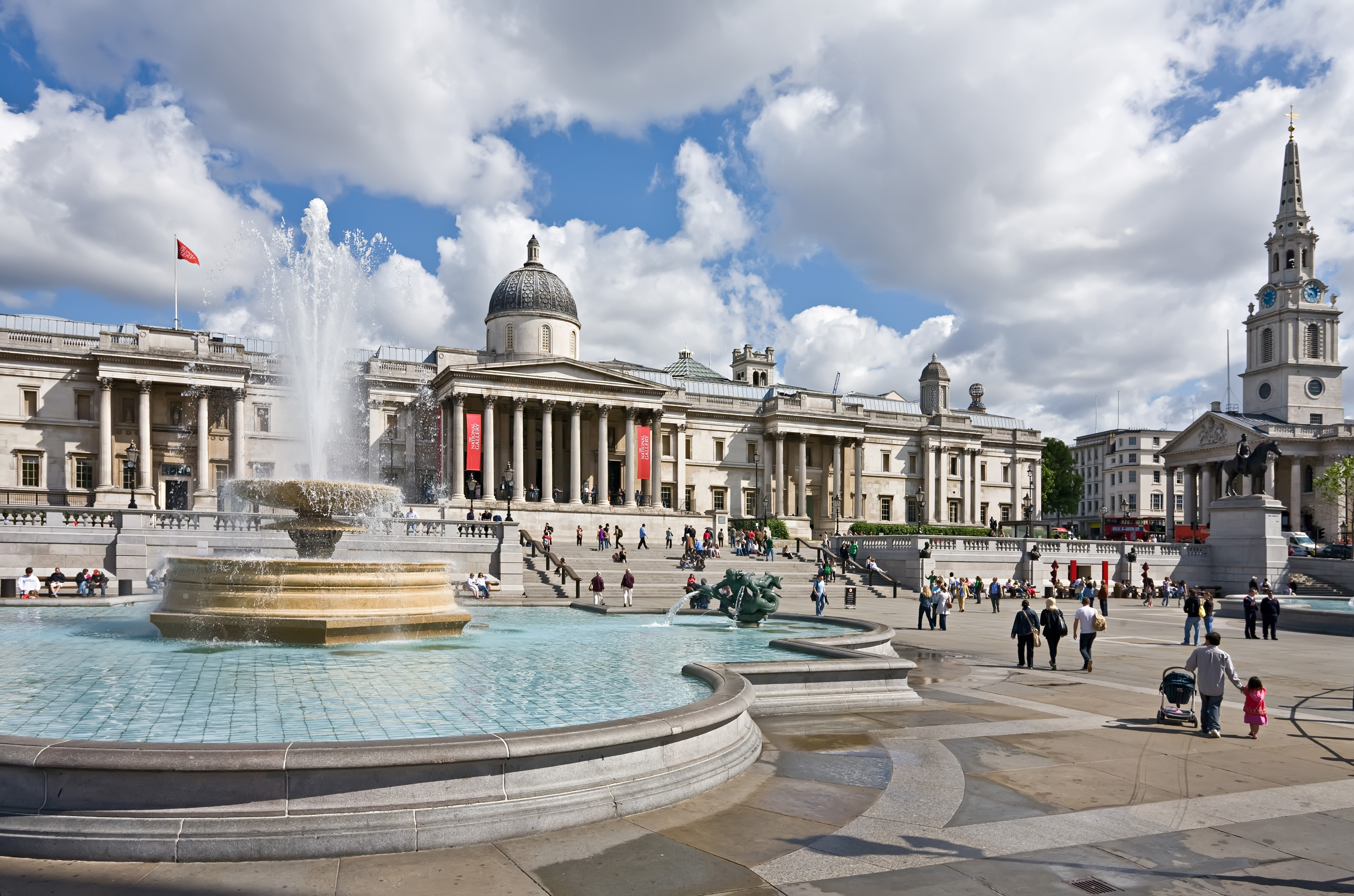
Trafalgar Square has an area of about one hectare.

The name was coined in French, from the Latin ārea. The hectare is equivalent to 10,000 square metres. It is widely used throughout the world for the measurement of large areas of land, and it is the legal unit of measure in some domains concerned with land ownership, planning, and management, including law (land deeds), agriculture, forestry, and town planning throughout the European Union, South Africa, New Zealand, Australia, Canada and the United Kingdom. However, the United States and Myanmar (Burma) use the acre instead of the hectare for measuring surface or land area.

In many countries, metrification redefined or clarified existing measures in terms of metric units. The following legacy units of area have been redefined as being equal to one hectare:

- Jerib (Persian: جریب) in Iran
- Djerib (Turkish: cerip) in Turkey
- Gongqing (traditional Chinese: 公頃; simplified Chinese: 公顷; pinyin: gōngqǐng) in China
- Manzana in Argentina
- Bunder in the Netherlands (until 1937)

In Mexico, land area measurements are commonly given as combinations of hectares, ares, and centiares. These are commonly written separated by a hyphen; for example, 1-21-00.26 ha would mean 1 hectare, 21 are, and 0.26 centiare (12100.26 m^{2}).

== History ==
The metric system of measurement was first given a legal basis in 1795 by the French Revolutionary government. The law of 18 Germinal, Year III (7 April 1795) defined five units of measure:

- The metre for length
- The are (100 m^{2}) for area [of land]
- The stère (1 m^{3}) for volume of stacked firewood
- The litre (1 dm^{3}) for volumes of liquid
- The gram for mass

In 1960, when the metric system was updated as the International System of Units (SI), the are did not receive international recognition. The International Committee for Weights and Measures (CIPM) used to classify the hectare as a "Non-SI unit accepted for use with the International System of Units" but As of 2026, the International Bureau of Weights and Measures (BIPM) no longer describes it and other widely used non-SI units as accepted.

In 1972, the European Economic Community (EEC) passed directive 71/354/EEC, which catalogued the units of measure that might be used within the Community. The units that were catalogued replicated the recommendations of the CGPM, supplemented by a few other units including the are (and implicitly the hectare) whose use was limited to the measurement of land.

== Unit family ==
Definition of a hectare and of an are

The names centiare, deciare, decare and hectare are derived by adding the standard metric prefixes to the original base unit of area, the are.

=== Decimilliare ===
The decimilliare (dma, sometimes seen in cadastre area evaluation of real estate plots) is 1/10,000 are or one square decimetre. Such usage of a double prefix is non-standard. The decimilliare is (100 mm)^{2} or roughly a four-inch-by-four-inch square. (The decimilliare is smaller by approximately 3.1%.)

=== Centiare ===
The centiare is one square metre.

=== Deciare ===
The deciare (rarely used) is ten square metres.

=== Are ===
The are (/ɛər/,/ɛr/) is a unit of area, equal to 100 square metres (10 m × 10 m), used for measuring land area. It was defined by older forms of the metric system, but is now outside the modern International System of Units (SI). It is still commonly used in speech to measure real estate, in particular in Indonesia, India, and in various European countries.

In Russian and some other languages of the former Soviet Union, the are is called sotka (сотка: 'a hundred', i.e. 100 m^{2} or 1/100 hectare). It is used to describe the size of suburban dacha or allotment garden plots or small city parks where the hectare would be too large. Many Russian dachas are 6 ares in size (in Russian, шесть соток).

=== Decare ===
The decare or dekare (/ˈdɛkɑːr, -ɛər/) is derived from deca and are, and is equal to 10 ares or 1000 square metres. It is used in Norway and in the former Ottoman areas of the Middle East and Bulgaria as a measure of land area. The names of the older land measures of similar size are usually used, redefined as exactly one decare:

- Stremma in Greece
- Dunam, dunum, dulum, donum, or dönüm in the Balkans, Israel, Palestine, Jordan, Lebanon, Syria, and Turkey
- Mål in Norway.

== Conversions ==
Metric and British imperial/United States customary comparisons
Unit name	Symbol	Multiple of preceding unit	Fraction of succeeding unit	Length of square side	SI equivalents	British imperial/United States customary equivalents
centiare	ca		0.1 da	1 m	1 m^{2}	10.76391 ft^{2}
deciare	da	10 ca	0.1 a	3.1623 m	10 m^{2}	11.95990 yd^{2}
are	a	10 da	0.1 daa	10 m	100 m^{2}	3.95369 perches
decare	daa	10 a	0.1 ha	31.623 m	1000 m^{2}	0.988422 roods
**hectare**	**ha**	**10 daa**	**0.01 km^{2}**	**100 m**	**10000 m^{2}**	**2.47105 acres**
**square kilometre**	**km^{2}**	**100 ha**		**1000 m**	**1000000 m^{2}**	**0.386102 mi^{2}**

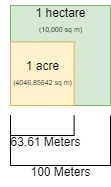
An acre shown inside a hectare for size comparison

The most commonly used units are in bold.

One hectare is also equivalent to:

- 1 square hectometre
- 1.008 chō (Japan)
- 2.381 feddan (Egypt)
- 6.25 rai (Thailand)
- 10 dunam or dönüm (Middle East)
- 10 stremmata (Greece)
- 15 mǔ or 0.15 qǐng

== Unicode ==
The Unicode character U+33CA ㏊ SQUARE HA, in the CJK Compatibility block, is intended for compatibility with pre-existing East Asian character codes. It is not intended for use in alphabetic contexts. U+3336 ㌶ SQUARE HEKUTAARU is a combination of ヘクタール (hekutāru), the Japanese translation of "hectare".

== See also ==
- Conversion of units
- Hectometre
- Order of magnitude
