= Maymana District =

- District
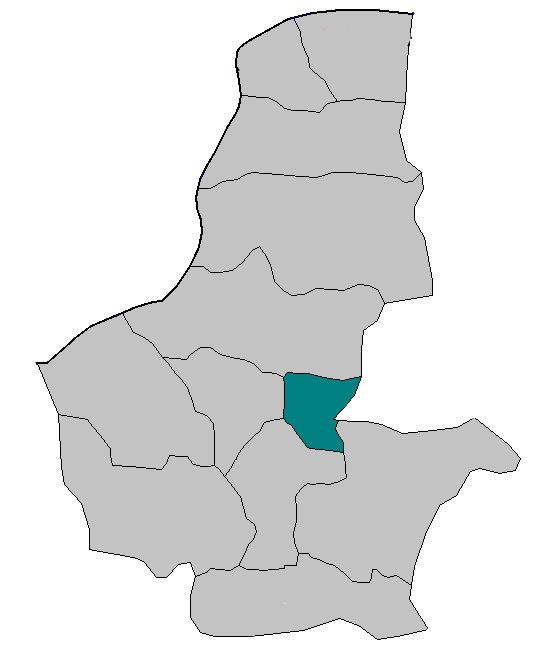
- Location in Faryab province
- Country: Afghanistan
- Province: Faryab
- Capital: Maymana

Population (2006)
  - Total: 68,055
- Time zone: UTC+04:30 (AST)

Maymana is a district of Faryab province, Afghanistan. The seat lies at Maymana.
