= Dawlat Abad District =

Dawlat Abad دولت‌آباد
- District
- Location within Afghanistan
- Coordinates: 36°32′N 65°04′E
- Country: Afghanistan
- Province: Faryab

Area
  - Total: 2,598 km^{2} (1,003 sq mi)

Population (2009)
  - Total: 95,800

Dawlat Abad (Pashto: دولت‌آباد) is a district in Faryab Province, Afghanistan. The population of the district was estimated 95,800 in 2009.

The centre of the district is the town of Dawlat Abad (population 5000), located at 36.4372°N 64.9228°E, 447 m altitude, on the route from Sheberghan to Maimana. At one time it had a bazaar with 180 shops and caravanserais. Dawlat Abad is a centre for carpet-weaving in northern Afghanistan.

From 24 April and 7 May 2014, flash flooding from heavy rainfall resulted in the destruction of public facilities, roads, and agricultural land. Within the villages of Khair Abad, Qoraish, Sheikh ha, Popalzayi, Qozibay Qala, Jare Bagh, and Takht Eshan, 486 families were affected, 5 people killed, 250 livestock killed and 5,000 Jeribs of agricultural land damaged.

The Taliban captured Dawlat Abad District in June 2021, killing at least 24 Afghan commandos and five police officers in the process. Among the dead was Major Sohrab Azimi, son of retired General Zahir Azimi. He was posthumously promoted to brigadier general.
