= Maymana Airport =

Airport in Faryab, Afghanistan

Maymana Airport میدان هوایی میمنه
- IATA: MMZ; ICAO: OAMN

Summary
- Airport type: Public
- Owner: Ministry of Transport and Civil Aviation
- Serves: Maymana
- Location: Afghanistan
- Elevation AMSL: 2,752 ft / 839 m
- Coordinates: 35°55′50″N 064°45′40″E

Map
- Location of Maymana Airport in Afghanistan

Runways
Direction	Length		Surface
Direction	ft	m	Surface
14/32	6,561	2,000	Asphalt
- Sources: Landings.com, Google Maps, AIP Afghanistan

Maymana Airport (IATA: MMZ, ICAO: OAMN) is a domestic airport located in the northwestern section of Maymana, Afghanistan, which is the capital of Faryab Province.

Other nearby airports in Afghanistan are Andkhoy Airport in Faryab Province, Sheberghan Airport in Jowzjan Province, Chaghcharan Airport in Ghor Province, and Qala i Naw Airport in Badghis Province.

== Airlines and destinations ==
As of September 2025, there are no scheduled services at the airport.

=== Former airlines and destinations ===
Airlines	Destinations
Ariana Afghan Airlines	Mazar-i-Sharif
Bakhtar Afghan Airlines	Kandahar
East Horizon Airlines	Herat

== See also ==
- List of airports in Afghanistan
