= Qaramqol District =

Qaramqol قرم‌قل
- District
- Location within Afghanistan
- Coordinates: 36°47′N 64°58′E
- Country: Afghanistan
- Province: Faryab

Population (2009)
  - Total: 17,100

Qaramqol (Dari: قرم‌قل) district is located south of Andkhoy District in the northern part of Faryab province. with an ethnic composition of 5% Pashtun, 35% Uzbek and 60% Turkman. The district center Qaram Qũl is close to the town of Andkhoy.
