= E 14 (Norway) =

Norwegian Intelligence Service unit

E 14 (Norwegian: "Seksjon for spesiell innhenting", or E14) was a unit within the Norwegian Intelligence Service. The section was focusing on covert missions abroad. This particular unit was active from 1995 to 2005. The original section consisted of 140 individuals. Male and female agents worked together as a small independent unit to gather HUMINT intelligence information in various countries, including Bosnia and Hercegovina, Kosovo, Macedonia, Serbia, Sudan, Lebanon, Syria, Iraq, Iran, Somalia and Afghanistan.

== Evolution ==
The E 14 section was kept separate from the rest of the Norwegian Intelligence Service of Norway and its existence was known to very few individuals in Norway. The unit was established as a direct consequence of the turmoils in the Balkans in the middle of the 1990s. The enemy scenario in the Balkans became more difficult as NATO took overall command of the United Nations. To secure Norwegian personnel in the area, it was necessary to have a tighter and better intelligence.

The unit gathered vital information in the areas it operated. Information that gained the unit recognition both domestically and abroad.

E14 developed new ways of operation that made the team on the ground able to operate more independently than before.

The unit focused mainly on confidence-building activities, and primarily recruited people who had plenty of cultural and language skills, in addition to a "common sense" attitude.

According to information released about the unit actions, the E 14 unit was the first one to identify that Ibrahim Rugova would be the most likely person to create stability in Kosovo. This was at a time when Norway, represented by the then foreign minister Mr Knut Vollebæk was chairman of Organization for Security and Co-operation in Europe. Most other international leaders and governments were pointing out that Kosovo Liberation Army (UCK) was the best option. However the E 14 solution was accepted by the international community after a while.

=== 21st century ===
Agents from E 14 were already active in Afghanistan in 2000. Gathering HUMINT intelligence at a time when the country was under the Taliban regime, and was housing some of the world's most notorious terrorists. The unit was gathering information about the country and the population in the Khyber Pass border area between Afghanistan and Pakistan. The agents returned to Afghanistan only a few months after the September 11 attacks in 2001, and established a base in a house in Kabul. For three years they gathered vital information, and established connections with other contacts across the country.

E 14 was also one of very few western intelligence units that had central sources high up in the regime of Saddam Hussein before the invasion of Iraq. The sources gave the unit and the Norwegian Intelligence Service information that Saddam Hussein did not have weapons of mass destruction.

=== Merger ===
In 2006 the unit was merged into another section of the Norwegian Intelligence Service.

== See also ==
- Trond André Bolle
- Non-official cover
