= Shirin Tagab District =

Shirin Tagab شیرین تگاب
- District
- Location within Afghanistan
- Coordinates: 36°15′N 64°49′E
- Country: Afghanistan
- Province: Faryab
- Elevation: 525 m (1,722 ft)

Shirin-Tagab (meaning in Uzbek language: "Sweet Water", also known as Koh-i-Saiyād) is the district center in the Faryab Province, Afghanistan. The population was 141,642 in 2013. Ethnic composition includes 10% Pashtun, 10% Tajik and 80% Uzbek.

This Turkmen populated township is 33 km to the south of Dawlatabad. The valley of Shirin-Tagab hosts many villages with a central township comprising two hundred shops. The Shirin-Tagab road in a point, which is 20 km from Maymana, branches off the river's stream valley. In 1969 it was named Deh-e Now. The people had developed a bazaar with 200 shops and eight caravanseries. Livestock and grain are the main items of transactions in the bazaar before the war.

Because most of the central and northern districts in Faryab Province have a salty water supply from the Shirin Tagab River, many civilians bring water from the Shirin Tagab bazaar.
