= Pashtun Kot District =

Pashtun Kot پشتون کوت
- District
- Location within Afghanistan
- Coordinates: 35°49′N 64°47′E
- Country: Afghanistan
- Province: Faryab
- Elevation: 907 m (2,976 ft)

Population
  - Estimate (2002): 277,000

Pashtun Kot is a district of Afghanistan, located in the centre of Faryab Province, south of the provincial capital Maymana. The district centre Pashtun Kot is a suburb of Maymana (35.91167°N 64.78667°E). The population is 277,000 (2002) with an ethnic composition of 65% Uzbeks and 30% Tajiks.

Between 24 April and 7 May 2014, flash flooding from heavy rainfall resulted in the destruction of public facilities, roads, and agricultural land. Assessment findings reported 319 families in total were affected, six people died, 517 livestock were killed, 350 gardens were damaged/destroyed, and 524 jeribs of agricultural land was damaged/destroyed in Kata Qala, Nadir Abad, Nawe Khoshk, and Chakab.
