= Almar District =

Almar المار
- District
- Location within Afghanistan
- Coordinates: 35°58′N 64°17′E
- Country: Afghanistan
- Province: Faryab

Area
  - Total: 1,525 km^{2} (589 sq mi)

Almar (Dari: المار) is a district in the southwestern part of Faryab province, Afghanistan. Its northern border is the national border with Turkmenistan. The population was estimated at 150,000 in 2013. Ethnic diversity includes 35% Turkmen and 65% Pashtun.

The district centre is the ancient bazaar town of Almar, 35.8464°N 64.5333°E (also known as Alaqadari-i-Almar or Almar Bazar). Located in a dry desert at an altitude of 847m, 35 km from Maimana, this town is a major supply centre for all the villages on the banks of the Band-i-Turkestan river.

From 24 April and 7 May 2014, flash flooding from heavy rainfall resulted in the destruction of public facilities, roads, and agricultural land. Assessment findings reported 84 families were affected, 700 livestock were killed, 45 gardens were damaged, and 37 Jeribs of agricultural land were damaged/destroyed.

On March 3, 2021, the district fell to the Taliban
