= Qaysar District =

Qaisar قیصار
- District
- Location within Afghanistan
- Coordinates: 35°38′N 64°17′E
- Country: Afghanistan
- Province: Faryab

Population (2009)
  - Total: 122,300

Qaisar (Qaysar or Qeysar) (Dari: قیصار) is a district situated in the southwestern part of the Faryab province of Afghanistan. In 2021, the population was 400,000 with an ethnic composition of 70% Uzbek (Turkic origin), 16% Tajik, 10% Pashtun and 4% Turkman. The district center Qeysar (35.6894°N 64.2947°E,1279 m altitude) (Qaisar bazaar), at the edge of the vast desert of Qaisar, has almost the same peculiarities of the Almar bazaar. This bazaar received its name at the end of the nineteenth century.

Qaisar is famous for its excellent production of grapes, and 70% of the district's population owns grape gardens. The gardeners export tons of raisins to surrounding provinces in the north of the country and abroad to Russia and India, as fresh grapes can not be exported due to transportation problems and bad road conditions.

The district is watered by the river, which starts in the Terband-I-Turkistan Mountains and flows into Qaisar. The water source is from snow melts and springs. The temperature ranges between -20C (-4F) in winter and 40C (106F) in summer.

The district is the home of one of Afghanistan's most famous late poets, Nadim Qaisari, from whom Afghans inherited a valuable poetry book named Dewan Nadim. The book was compiled and published by the Information and Culture Department of Faryab Province after his death, as it could not be published before due to lack of funding. The book contains poetry and cultural activities that Nadim achieved during this period.

== 2014 floods ==
From 24 April to 7 May 2014, flash flooding from heavy rainfall destroyed public facilities, roads and agricultural land. Assessment findings reported that 20 families were affected, seven people died, 700 livestock were killed, 1,000 gardens were damaged, and 1,000 jeribs of agricultural land were damaged or destroyed (equivalent to 200 hectares (490 acres)
