= Almar =

Almar is a masculine given name and a surname. It originates from the Old Norse word Almarr which means warrior or famous.

Notable people with the name include:

== Given name ==
- Per Almar Aas (1929–2014), Norwegian politician
- Almar Orri Atlason (born 2004), Icelandic basketball player
- Almar Heggen (1933–2014), Norwegian opera singer
- Almar Latour, Dutch media executive

== Surname ==
- Iván Almár (born 1932), Hungarian astronomer
