= Jerib =

Comparison of Area units
jerib to metric/English
jerib	m-ft	ha-acre
1 jerib (Iran)	10,000 m^{2}	1 hectare
1 jerib (Iran)	107,639 ft^{2}	2.4711 acre
1 jerib (Afghan)	2,000 m^{2}	0.2 hectare
1 jerib (Afghan)	21,760 ft^{2}	0.4942 acre
metric/English to jerib
units	jerib (Iran)	jerib (Afghan)
1 ha	1 jerib (I)	5 jerib (A)
1 acre	0.4049 jerib (I)	2.0234 jerib (A)
10,000 sq yd	0.8361 jerib (I)	4.1806 jerib (A)

The jerib or djerib (Persian: جریب; Turkish: cerip) is a traditional unit of land measurement in the Middle East and southwestern Asia. It is a unit of area used to measure land holdings (real property) in much the way that an acre or hectare are. Like most traditional units of measure, the jerib originally varied substantially from one location to another. However, in the twentieth century, the jerib has been regionally, if not uniformly defined. In many countries where it was traditionally used, it is equated with the hectare, for example in Turkey and Iran. In Afghanistan, however, it is standardized at 2,000 square metres (0.49 acres).

The jerib was roughly equivalent to the other customary land measures in south Asia and the Middle East, the Indian bigha and the Sumerian iku, varying between 1,600 and 3,600 square metres (0.40 and 0.89 acres). The word is probably derived from Arabic.

== Historical ==
The royal enclosure at Isfahan in Iran was named Hazar Jerib for the expanse of irrigated acreage, namely 1000 jeribs.

== See also ==
- bigha, roughly equivalent land measure in Nepal and northern India
