= Bilchiragh District =

Bilchiragh بلچراغ
- District
- Location within Afghanistan
- Coordinates: 35°53′N 65°27′E
- Country: Afghanistan
- Province: Faryab
- Elevation: 1,263 m (4,144 ft)

Population (2009)
  - Total: 46,200

Bilchiragh (also transliterated as Belcherãgh) (Dari: بلچراغ) is a district in the southern part of Faryab province, Afghanistan. The main town, Belcheragh, is situated in the northwest of the district at 35.8386°N 65.2308°E, 1263 m altitude.
