= Faryab Province =

Province of Afghanistan

Faryab فاریاب
- Province
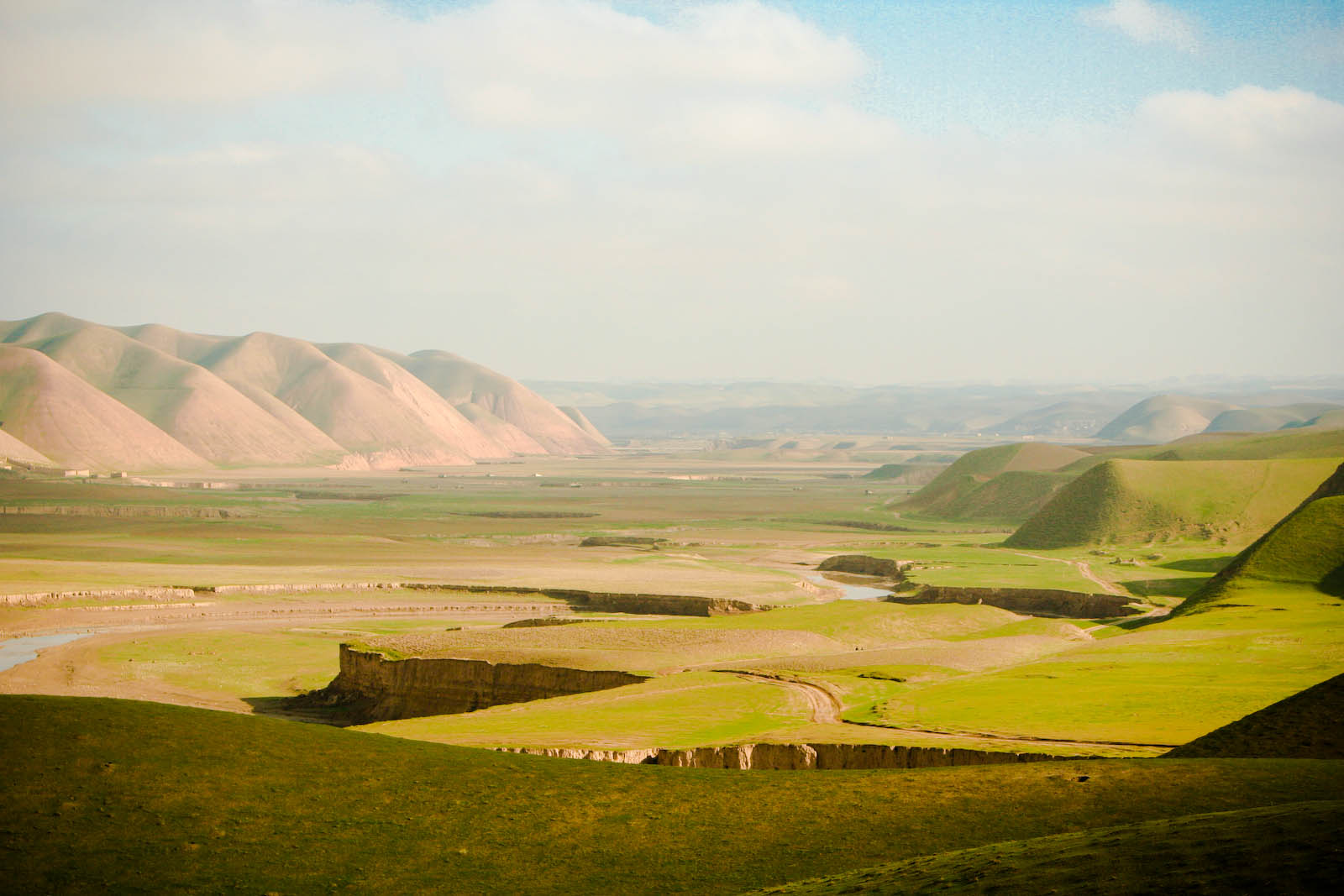
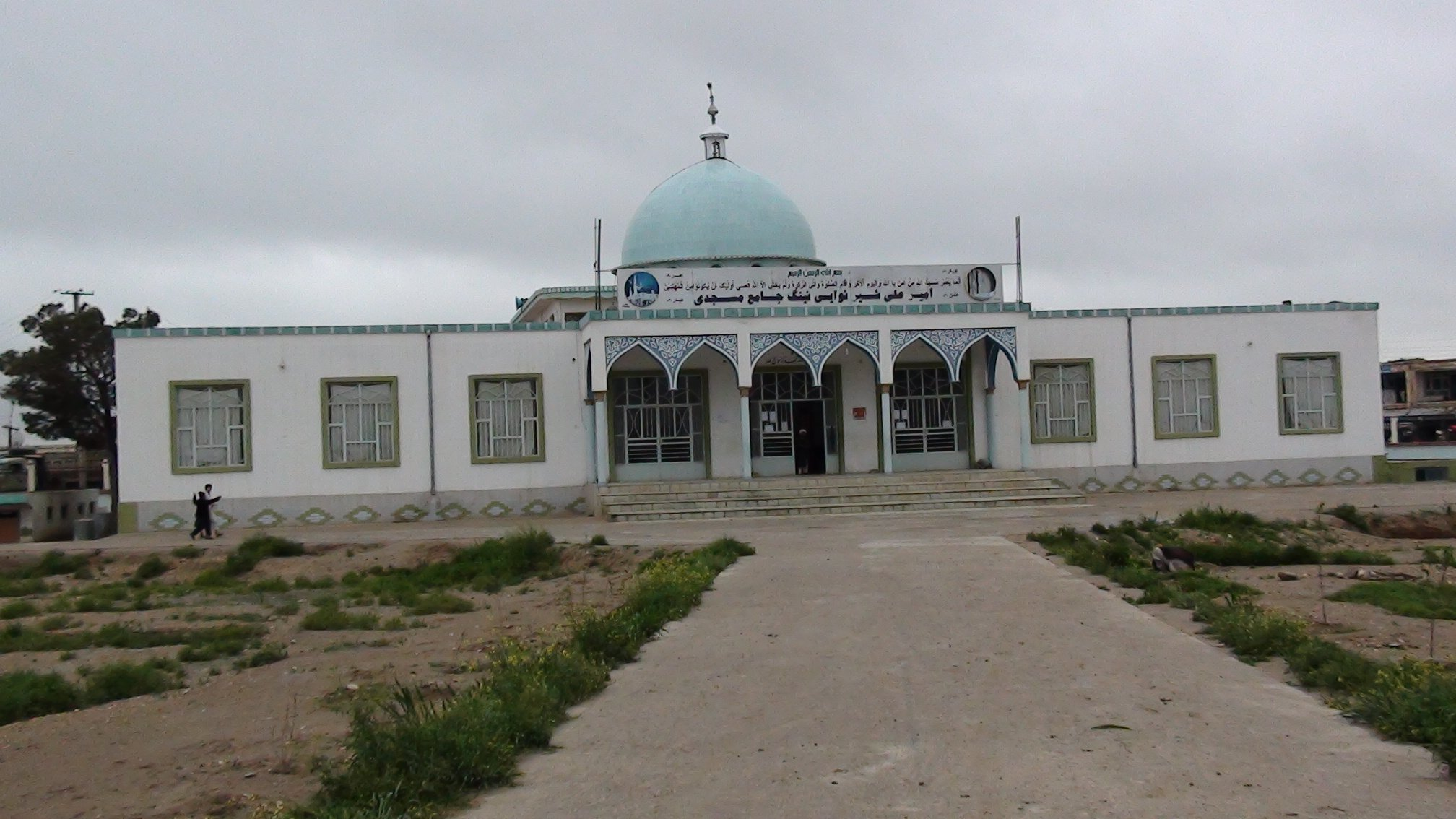
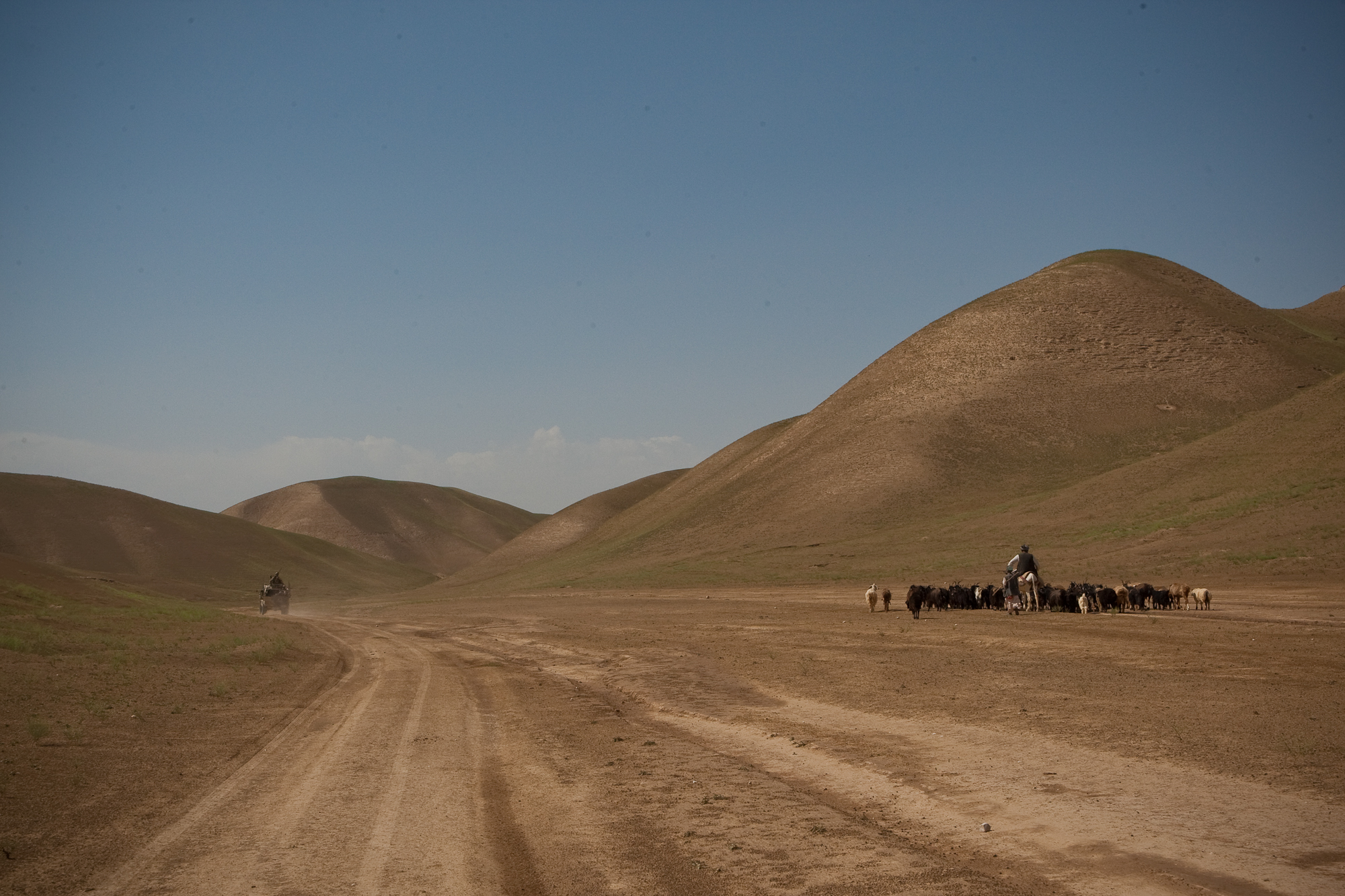
- From the top, View over the Faryab Province, Andkhoy, Faryab Landscape.

- Map of Afghanistan with Faryab highlighted
- Coordinates (Capital): 36°15′N 64°50′E
- Country: Afghanistan
- Capital: Maymana

Government
  - Governor: Qari Sahib Hafizullah Pahlawan
  - Deputy Governor: Maulvi Sahib Abdul Wali Atqani
  - Police Chief: Huzaifa Sahib

Area
  - Total: 20,797.6 km^{2} (8,030.0 sq mi)

Population (2021)
  - Total: 1,129,528
  - Density: 54.3105/km^{2} (140.664/sq mi)
- Time zone: UTC+4:30 (Afghanistan Time)
- Postal code: 18XX
- ISO 3166 code: AF-FYB

Faryab (Pashto, (Note: Pashto pronunciation: [pɑɾ.jɑb, fɑɾ.jɑb]) Dari: (Note: Dari pronunciation: [fɑːɾ.jɑ́ːb]) فاریاب) is one of the thirty-four provinces of Afghanistan, which is located in the north of the country bordering neighboring Turkmenistan. It has a population of about 1,109,223, which is multi-ethnic and mostly a tribal society. The province encompasses 15 districts and over 1,000 villages. The capital of Faryab province is Maymana. It also borders Jowzjan Province, Sar-e Pol Province, Ghor Province and Badghis Province.

== History ==
Faryab is a Persian toponym meaning "lands irrigated by diversion of river water". The name Faryab takes its name from a town founded in the area by the Sassanids. It is the home town of the famed Islamic philosopher, al-Farabi (per the biographer Ibn al-Nadim). The area is part of the trans-border region of Greater Khorasan; during the colonial era, British geographers referred to the area as Afghan Turkestan.

The history of settlement in Faryab is ancient and comprises layer upon layer of occupation. At times, it was a melting pot within which a host of cultures have merged into a non-conflictual whole or at least peaceable coexistence.

Maymana and Andkhoy (Andkhui) entered written history 2,500 years ago when Jews arrived and settled in 586 BC, fleeing the destruction of Jerusalem by Nebuchadnezzar. The territory was under Persian control at the time, which later gave way to Greek rule following the conquest by Alexander the Great in 326 BC.

Persian dominance was restored from the 3rd to the 7th century AD.

The pre-Islamic period ended with the conquest of northern Afghanistan by Arab Muslims (651-661 AD). The area "turned into a vast battlefield as the two great Arab and Persian cultures battled for not only political and geographical supremacy but ideological supremacy." As a result, centuries of Zoroastrianism, Buddhism, Nestorian Christianity and indigenous pagan cults were swept away. Various Islamic dynasties rose to power and influenced the locals. They included the Saffarids, Samanids, Ghaznavids, Seljuks, and Ghurids.

The history of Faryab was greatly altered yet again in the 13th century, this time with the invasion of the Mongols, under Genghis Khan and his descendants. As they moved into the area from the north, cities and towns including Maymana were razed, populations massacred, grain, fields and livestock stolen or burnt and ancient irrigation systems obliterated. Faryab was itself destroyed by the Mongols in 1220. Control by the Mongols stemmed from the alternating capitals of Bukhara or Samarkand north of the Amu Darya River. They ruled in a decentralized manner, however, allowing local tribal chiefs in Maymana and elsewhere considerable autonomy (a legacy which was to last until the end of the 19th century).

In 1500, Uzbek princes, in the form of the Khanate of Bukhara (a Turco-Mongol state), swept across the Amu Darya, reaching Faryab and related areas around 1505. They joined a substantial and largely pastoral Arab population and ruled the area until the mid-18th century.

It was conquered by Ahmad Shah Durrani in 1748 and became part of the Durrani Empire. The area was untouched by the British during the three Anglo-Afghan wars that were fought in the 19th and 20th centuries. Faryab become a province in 1964. From the administrative reforms of the 1930s until then it was known as Maymana and was a sub-province of Balkh Province, which had its headquarters in Mazar-i-Sharif.

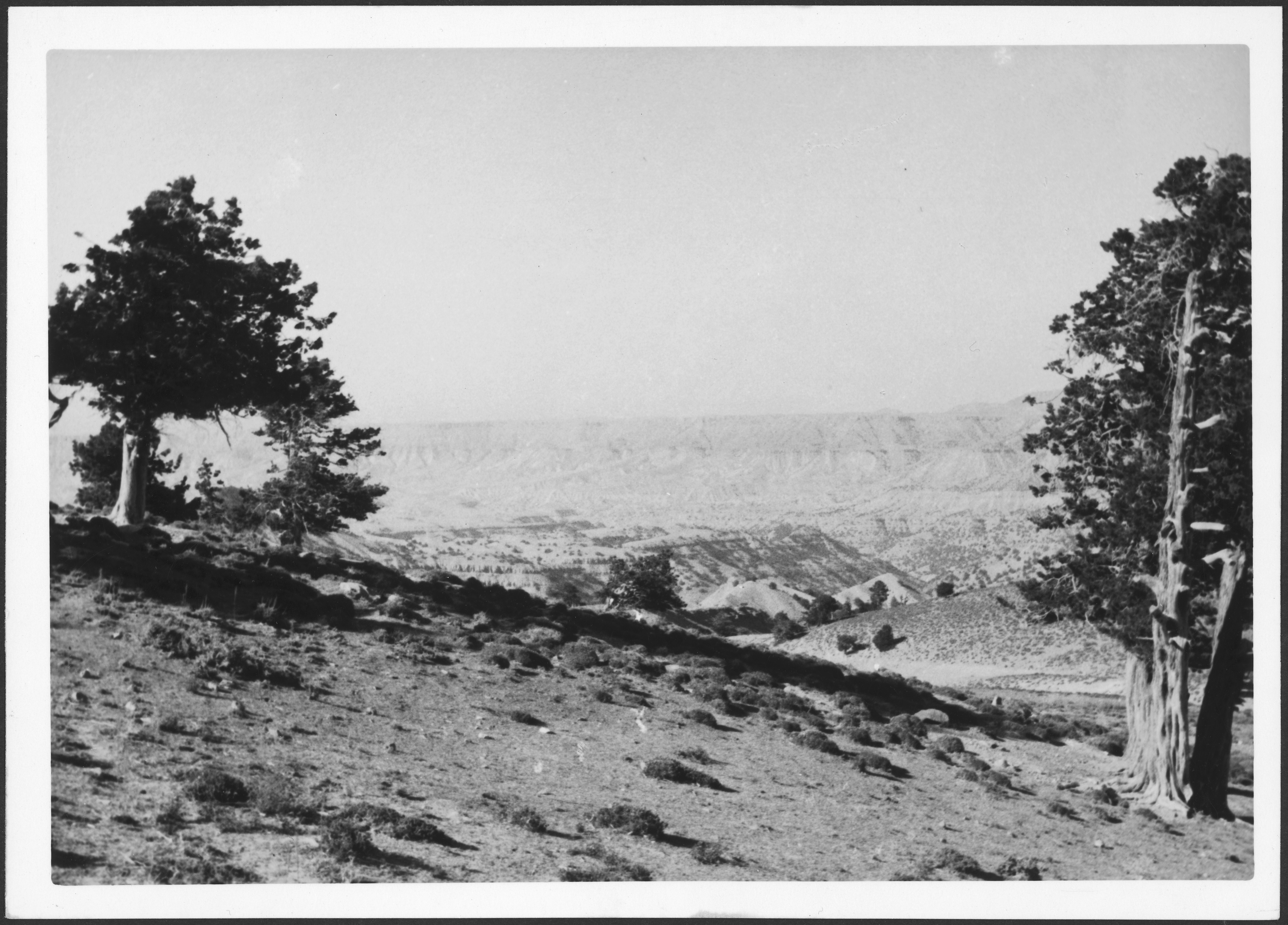
View near the Zarmast Pass (Sauzak Pass) in 1939, which connects Faryab's Maymana to the city of Herat

During the 1990s Afghan Civil War (early 90s and late 90s), the front line between Taliban and opposition forces often fell between Badghis and Faryab provinces in the mid-1990s. Ismail Khan also fled to Faryab to reconstitute his forces following the Taliban takeover of Herat Province, but was betrayed by Abdul Malik Pahlawan.

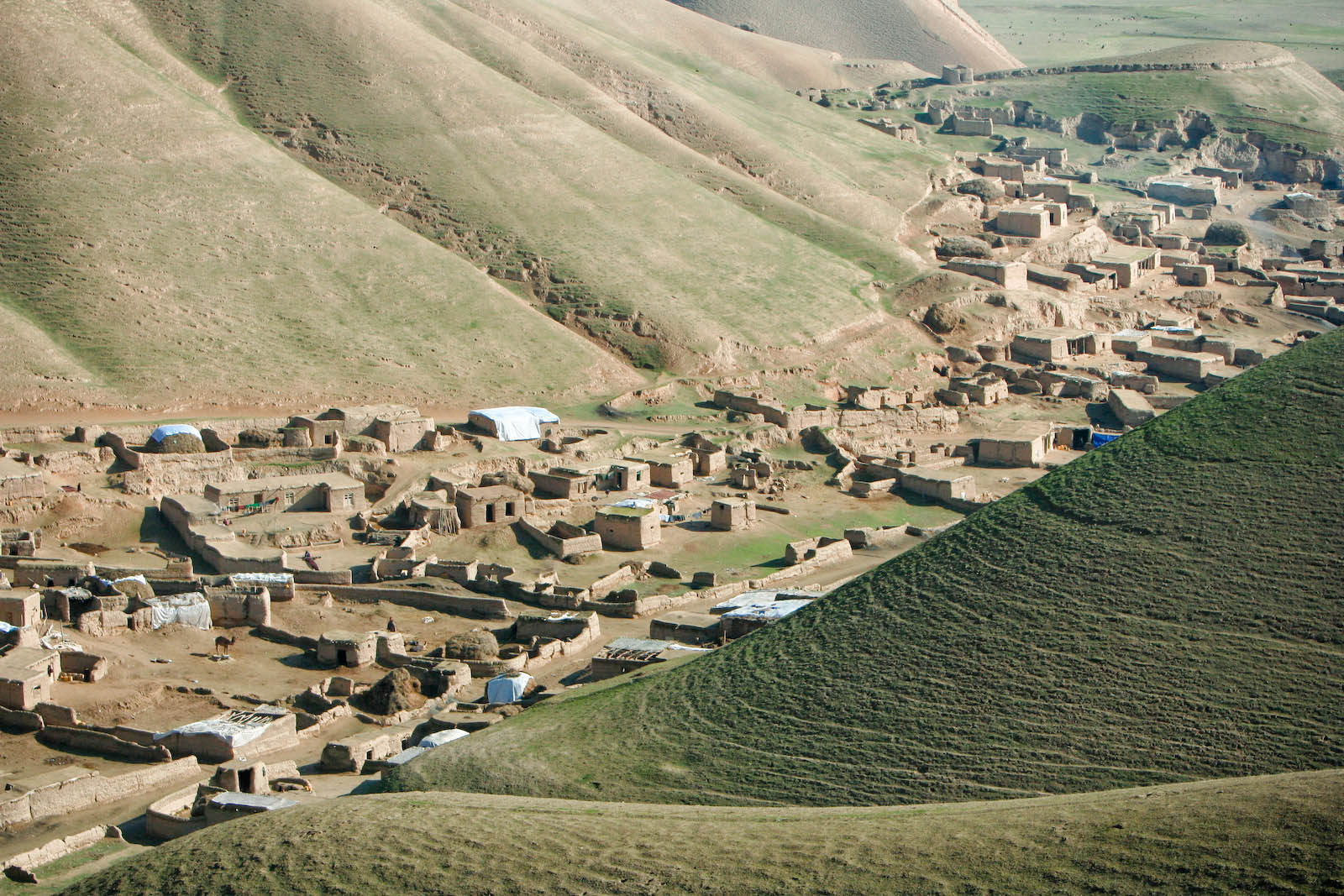
A village in Faryab province

In May 1997, Abdul Malik Pahlawan raised the Taliban flag over the capital of Maymana, switching sides and initiating a renewed Taliban offensive from the west. Following a series of changing allegiances and falling out with Malik, the Taliban withdrew from the area, but in 1998 a contingent of 8,000 Taliban fighters pressed through Faryab, seizing Abdul Rashid Dostum's headquarters in Sheberghan, in neighboring Jowzjan province.

Faryab province has been one of the more peaceful areas in Afghanistan since the fall of the Taliban government in late 2001. Recent development projects in the province have focused on expanding the agricultural potential of the province, in particular the re-forestation of areas of the province that were denuded in the recent past.

It was reported in 2006 that Abdul Malik Pahlawan's Freedom Party of Afghanistan still maintained an armed militant wing, which was contributing to instability in province. The Afghan National Security Forces (ANFS) began expanding and slowly took over control. The Afghanistan-Turkmenistan border is maintained by the Afghan Border Police (ABP) while law and order for the rest of the province is provided by the NATO-trained Afghan National Police (ANP).

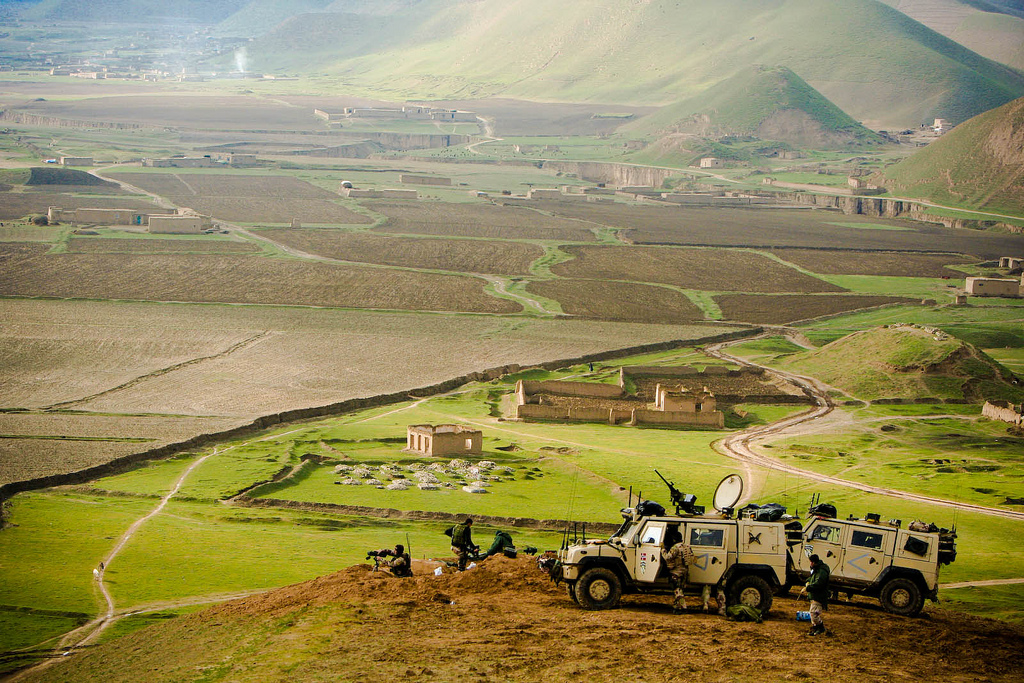
Provincial Reconstruction Team (PRT) members of the Norwegian Army on a patrol in Faryab Province (December 2009)

Between 2006 and late 2014, the province had a Provincial Reconstruction Team (PRT), which was led by Norway. The Norwegian PRT had its base at Maymana and had also been given the responsibility for the Ghormach District.

Afghanistan signed a deal with China National Petroleum Corporation (CNPC) for the development of oil blocks in the Amu Darya basin, a project expected to earn billions of dollars over two decades; the deal covers drilling and a refinery in the northern provinces of Sar-e Pol and Faryab, and is the first international oil production agreement entered into by the Afghan government for several decades. CNPC began Afghan oil production in October 2012, and in the same month a huge gas reserves were discovered in the Andkhoy District of Faryab province.

In July 2016, Human Rights Watch accused Abdul Rashid Dostum's National Islamic Movement of Afghanistan of killing, abusing and looting civilians in Faryab.

As of January 2022, clashes have been reported in the province between the Taliban and resistance fighters, including in the provincial capital Maimana.

== Administrative divisions ==
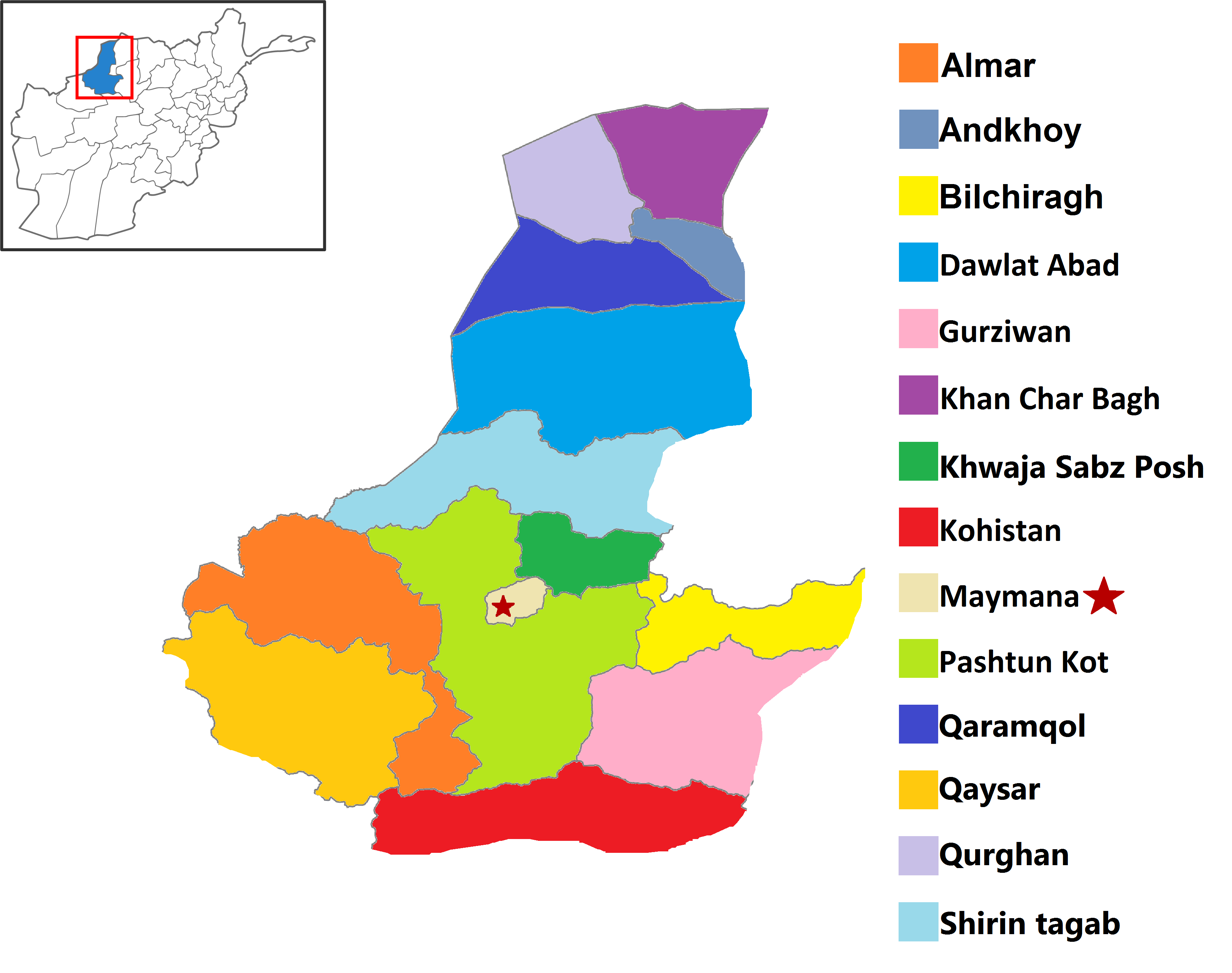
Districts of Faryab

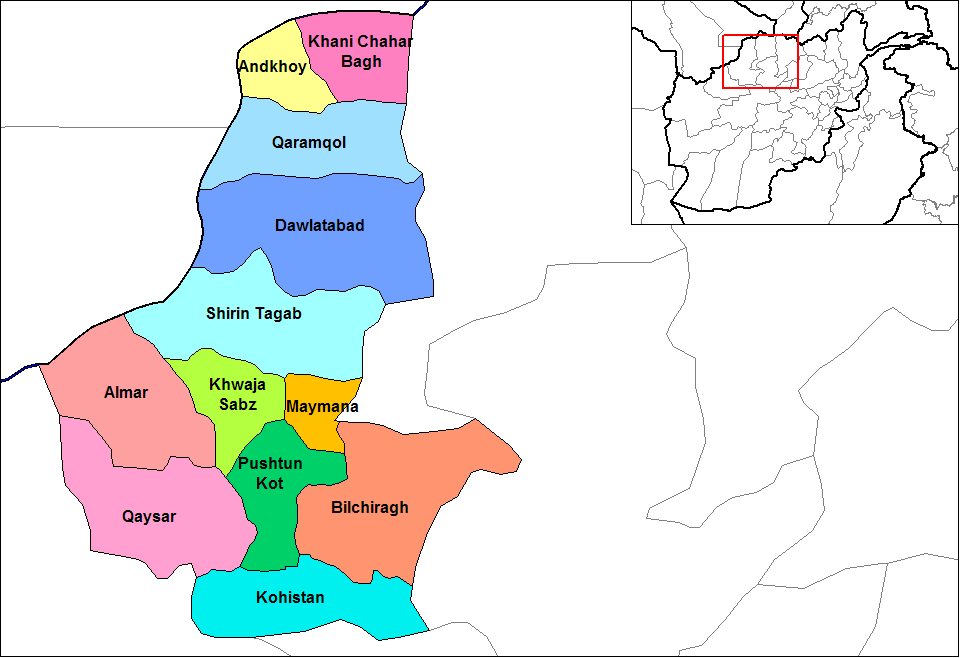
Map of the districts of Faryab as of January 2004, prior to the redrawing of provincial and district boundaries later that year

Districts of Faryab Province
District	Capital	Population	Area in km2	Pop. density	Number of villages and ethnic groups
Almar		79,449	2,034	39	86 villages. 60% Turkmens, 10% Tajiks, 10% Uzbeks, 10% Pashtuns.
Andkhoy	Andkhoy	46,789	378	124	81 villages. 58% Turkmens, 40% Uzbeks, 2% Pashtuns.
Bilchiragh		58,989	1,098	54	44 villages. 55% Uzbeks, 40% Tajiks5% Turkmens.
Dawlat Abad		55,186	2,657	21	56 villages. 40% Pashtuns, 30% Uzbeks, 20% Turkmens, 10% Tajiks.
Gurziwan		85,694	1,844	46	54 villages. 40% Uzbeks, 30% Tajiks, 20% Turkmens, 5% Pashtuns, 5% Others.
Khani Char Bagh		26,173	939	28	16 villages. 60% Uzbeks and 40% Turkmens.
Khwaja Sabz Posh		57,395	610	94	85 villages. 80% Tajiks, 19% Hazaras, 1% Pashtuns.
Kohistan		61,646	2,402	26	133 villages. 85% Uzbeks, 10% Tajiks, 5% Hazaras
Maymana	Maymana	95,971	90	1,061	60% Uzbeks, 30% Pashtuns
Pashtun Kot		213,371	2,807	76	331 villages. 65% Uzbeks, 30% Tajiks 5% Pashtuns
Qaramqol		22,187	1,079	21	19 villages / 73 Semi-villages. 60% Turkmens, 35% Uzbeks, 5% Pashtuns.
Qaysar		161,025	2,257	71	190 villages. 70% Uzbeks, 16% Tajiks, 10% Pashtuns, 4% Turkmens.
Qurghan		53,277	806	66	13 villages. 60% Turkmens, 40% Uzbeks.
Shirin Tagab		92,071	1,809	51	116 villages. 80% Uzbeks, 10% Tajiks, 10% Pashtuns.
Faryab		1,109,223	20,798	53	48.0% Uzbeks, 31.0% Tajik, 13.0% Turkmens, 6.0% Pashtuns, 1.5% Hazaras, 0.4% others. (Note: Note: "Predominantely" or "dominated" is interpreted as 99%, "majority" as 70%, "mixed" as 1/(number of ethnicities), "minority" as 30% and "few" or "some" as 1%.)

== Economy ==
=== Agriculture ===
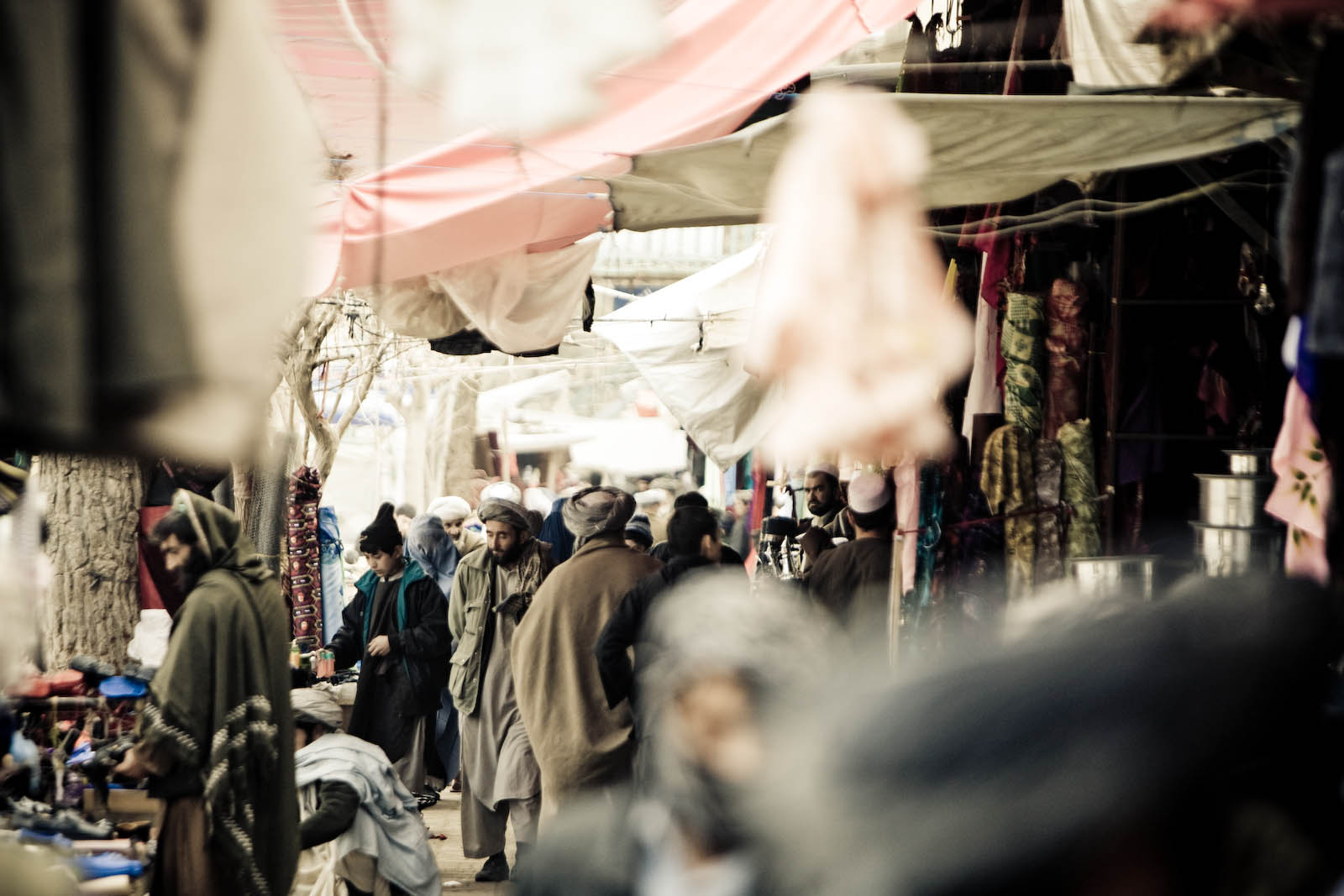
A market street in Maymana

Agriculture and animal husbandry are the primary economic activities in the province however Faryab is renowned for its carpets, knitted as well as woven Kilims, which are traditionally a female-dominated handicraft. The province has a disputed amount of natural gas reserves but levels of exploitation are low.

There is a salt mine in Dowlat Abad district and some marble resources (said to owned by Abdul Rashid Dostum) and there are also pistachio forests which produce Pistacia vera which are renowned for their color and intense flavor.

=== Transportation ===
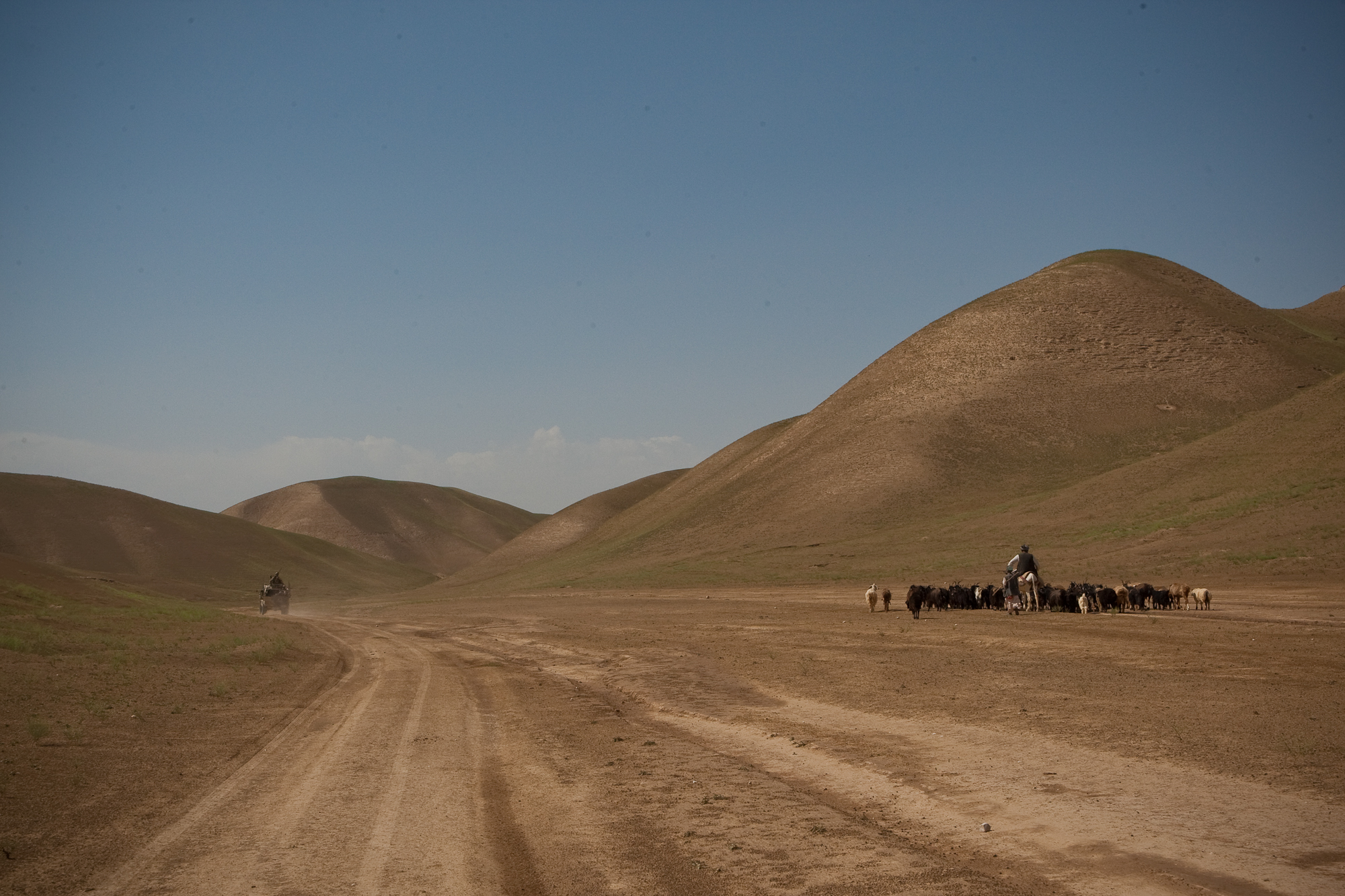
An unpaved road in the province (June 2010)

As of May 2014 Maymana Airport was served by regular passenger service to Herat.

The province's road infrastructure was described in 2006 as "completely in shambles" without even a single paved road.

There exists a short international railway connection between Andkhoy and Aqina, which then connects to the Turkmen rail network at Atamyrat.

== Demographics ==
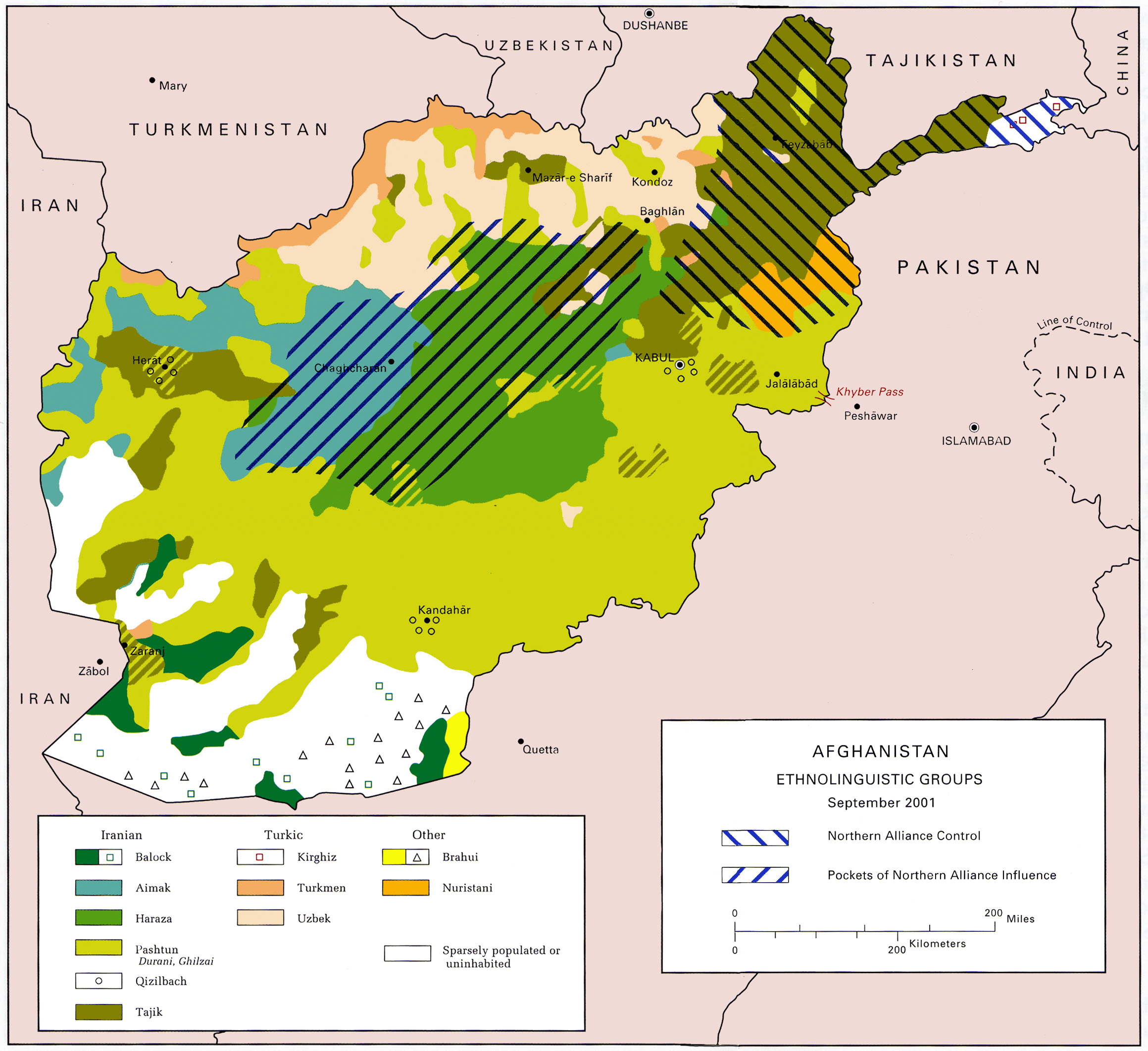
Ethnolinguistic groups in Afghanistan

=== Population ===
As of 2021, the population of Faryab is about 1,129,528.

=== Ethnicity, languages and religion ===
Faryab is multi-ethnic and mostly a tribal society. The main ethnic groups living in the province are Uzbeks followed by Turkmens, Tajiks, Pashtuns and others.

Dari, Uzbeki and Pashto are the main languages spoken in and around the province. All the inhabitants follow Islam, with Sunnis making up the majority while Shiites (Shias) make up the minority. The Shias are mainly the ethnic Hazaras.

Estimated ethnolinguistic and -religious composition
Ethnicity	Uzbek	Tajik/ Aimaq	Pashtun	Turkmen	Hazara	Baloch	Other	Sources
Period	Uzbek	Tajik/ Aimaq	Pashtun	Turkmen	Hazara	Baloch	Other	Sources

2004–2021 (Islamic Republic)	45 – 57%	<22 – 30%	9 – >17%	7%	5 – 6%	5%	∅
2020 EU	1st	–	–	–	–	–	–
2020 CSSF (Note: Demographic information is based on data from 2020.)	45%	30%	12%	–	6%	5%	–
2018 UN	majority	minority	minority	∅	∅	–	∅ (Note: incl. Arab.)
2015 CP	>50%	27%	17%	–	–	–	–
2011 PRT	major (Note: 53.5% of the population speaks Uzbek.)	minor (Note: Quote from the source: "The major ethnic groups are Uzbeks and Pashtuns, followed by Tajiks and Turkmens. [...] . The second most frequent language is Dari, spoken by [...] 27 percent of the population. Pashtu is spoken by [...] 13 percent of the population." This suggests that a substantial share of Pashtuns do not speak Pashto as their native language and are therefore underrepresented in the language-based percentage figures. Conversely, ethnic groups whose native language is Dari (like Tajiks) are overrepresented in these figures as a direct consequence.)	major (Note: excl. Kochi.)	–	–	–	–
2011 USA	54%	27%	13%	–	–	–	–
2007 UN	51 – 57%	22.3%	8.6%	6.6%	–	–	–

Legend:
- ∅: Ethnicity mentioned in source but not quantified
- –: Ethnicity not mentioned specifically
- Source abbreviations: Empirical sources: –, Government sources: CP – Colombo Plan, EU – European Union Agency for Asylum, PRT – Provincial Reconstruction Team of the United States government, UN – United Nations Assistance Mission in Afghanistan, Editorial sources: CSSF – Center for the Scientific Study of Families, USA – United States Army

=== Education ===
The overall literacy rate (6+ years of age) was 18% in 2011. The overall net enrolment rate (6–13 years of age) increased from 53% in 2005 to 55% in 2011.

=== Health ===
The percentage of households with clean drinking water increased from 23% in 2005 to 24% in 2011.

== See also ==
- Provinces of Afghanistan
