= Maymana =

City in Faryab Province, Afghanistan

Maimana میمنه
- Provincial capital
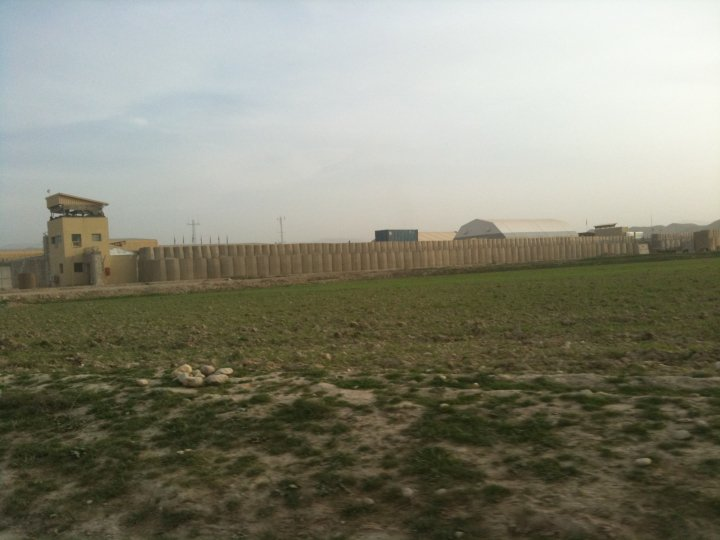
- A military base in 2011

- Location in Afghanistan
- Coordinates: 35°56′N 64°45′E
- Country: Afghanistan
- Province: Faryab
- District: Maymana

Government
  - Type: Municipality
  - Mayor: Damla Mohibullah

Area
  - Land: 35 km^{2} (14 sq mi)
- Elevation: 827 m (2,713 ft)

Population (2025)
  - Provincial capital: 108,049
  - Density: 3,100/km^{2} (8,000/sq mi)
  - Urban: 108,049
- Time zone: UTC+04:30 (Afghanistan Time)
- ISO 3166 code: AF-MMZ

Maimana, (Note: Pashto: ميمنه, romanized: Maimana [ˌmaɪmaˈna]; Dari: میمنه, romanized: Maymana [ˌmajmaˈna]) also spelled as Maymana, is a city in northern Afghanistan, serving as the capital of Faryab Province. It is within the jurisdiction of Maymana District and has an estimated population of 108,049 people. The city is approximately 400 km (250 mi) northwest of the country's capital Kabul, and is located on the Maymana River, which is a tributary of the Murghab River. The mayor of the city is Damla Mohibullah.

Maimana has a domestic airport, a number of bazaars, mosques, universities, public parks, hospitals, and over 16,560 dwelling units. The Afghanistan Ring Road passes through the city. The closest major cities to Maimana are Andkhoy in Faryab, Sheberghan in Jowzjan Province, and Sar-e-Pol in Sar-e-Pol Province. The city is to be connected by railroad with Herat to the southwest and Mazar-i-Sharif to the northeast.

== Geography ==
Maimana is located at the northern foot of the Torkestan Range at an elevation of 877 m (2,877 ft) on the old terrace of the Qeysar or Maimana River, which is a right tributary of the Murghab River. The Maimana River branches off of the Band-e Turkistan River 50 km (31 mi) south of the city. The highlands of the Maimana region generally possess a very rich topsoil which supports the seasonal agricultural activities.

=== Land use ===
Maimana is a trading and transit hub in northern Afghanistan. Just over half of the land in Maimana is non built-up (57%) consisting largely of agriculture. The central districts (2-5) have higher dwelling density and clear road grids. The outer districts (1, 7-10) are characterized by more agricultural land.

=== Climate ===
Maymana has a hot-summer Mediterranean climate (Köppen climate classification: Csa) with hot, dry summers and cold, moist winters.

Climate data for Maymana
Month	Jan	Feb	Mar	Apr	May	Jun	Jul	Aug	Sep	Oct	Nov	Dec	Year
Record high °C (°F)	25.3 (77.5)	27.5 (81.5)	32.6 (90.7)	35.3 (95.5)	39.8 (103.6)	42.5 (108.5)	44.5 (112.1)	40.5 (104.9)	38.3 (100.9)	35.1 (95.2)	30.6 (87.1)	27.6 (81.7)	44.5 (112.1)
Mean daily maximum °C (°F)	7.4 (45.3)	9.2 (48.6)	14.0 (57.2)	20.8 (69.4)	27.1 (80.8)	33.7 (92.7)	35.9 (96.6)	33.9 (93.0)	28.9 (84.0)	22.2 (72.0)	15.5 (59.9)	10.6 (51.1)	21.6 (70.9)
Daily mean °C (°F)	2.0 (35.6)	4.0 (39.2)	8.4 (47.1)	15.4 (59.7)	20.1 (68.2)	25.5 (77.9)	27.6 (81.7)	25.2 (77.4)	20.5 (68.9)	14.5 (58.1)	8.6 (47.5)	4.7 (40.5)	14.7 (58.5)
Mean daily minimum °C (°F)	−2.2 (28.0)	−0.2 (31.6)	3.8 (38.8)	9.6 (49.3)	12.7 (54.9)	16.3 (61.3)	18.5 (65.3)	16.6 (61.9)	12.3 (54.1)	7.6 (45.7)	3.5 (38.3)	0.3 (32.5)	8.2 (46.8)
Record low °C (°F)	−22.5 (−8.5)	−23.6 (−10.5)	−12.7 (9.1)	−3.1 (26.4)	2.4 (36.3)	6.1 (43.0)	10.6 (51.1)	9.0 (48.2)	0.2 (32.4)	−5.8 (21.6)	−12 (10)	−18 (0)	−23.6 (−10.5)
Average precipitation mm (inches)	49.9 (1.96)	60.5 (2.38)	82.2 (3.24)	60.5 (2.38)	25.6 (1.01)	1.0 (0.04)	0.5 (0.02)	0.0 (0.0)	0.2 (0.01)	9.6 (0.38)	20.9 (0.82)	44.7 (1.76)	355.6 (14)
Average rainy days	5	7	11	10	4	0	0	0	0	2	4	5	48
Average snowy days	6	5	3	0	0	0	0	0	0	0	1	3	18
Average relative humidity (%)	75	73	74	68	53	38	34	34	39	49	61	71	56
Mean monthly sunshine hours	136.6	117.7	169.3	195.9	306.0	370.0	381.2	352.5	303.5	237.2	159.1	137.9	2,866.9
Source: NOAA (1964-1983)

== History ==
The city is of ancient origin. It seems clear that Maymana citadel dates back to the early Iron Age. Ceramic materials in a nearby cave at Bilchiragh are from the Paleolithic and late Neolithic-Bronze Age. Between 800 B.C and 700 A.D it was part of Median and Persian Empire, as well of Kushanian and Hephtalite, before being subjugated by Arabs during the Islamic Conquest who used local Iranian vassals to rule the region. In the 7th and 8th century it was the residence of the Malik of Guzganan, last Kushanian remnants, which was then under the control of the Farighunid, a native dynasty. From the 9th to 11th century the region was ruled by several rulers and dynasties (Saffarid, Mihrabanid, Nasrid...) from Sistan and then being subjugated by the Iranian Samanid and the Irano-Turkic Ghaznavid and Khwarizm rulers.

In the 12th and 13th century the region was devastated by nomadic Turks and invading Mongols. It took long for the region, nearly 200 years, to recover from the damage the nomadic and invading Turko-Mongol foreigners from northern Central Asia had caused. The area's population remained thin and the commercial trade was very weak but enough for the survivors to develop new agricultural and rebuild old structures. While the city was garrisoned and hosted Iranians and some Arabs, the villages as well owned by Iranians and settled remnants of Arabs, the deserts and steppe were home of wandering nomads of Turko-Mongolian and Iranian stocks (Aymaq).

In the 16th century, the Turkic Uzbek influence came to Maymana with the invasions of Turkistan and Herat by Muhammad Shaibani. For the region it was again a complicated time. However, Shaibani was defeated by the Iranian Saffavids but the Uzbek elements remained dominant from then up to day in the region until in the 18th and 19th centuries.

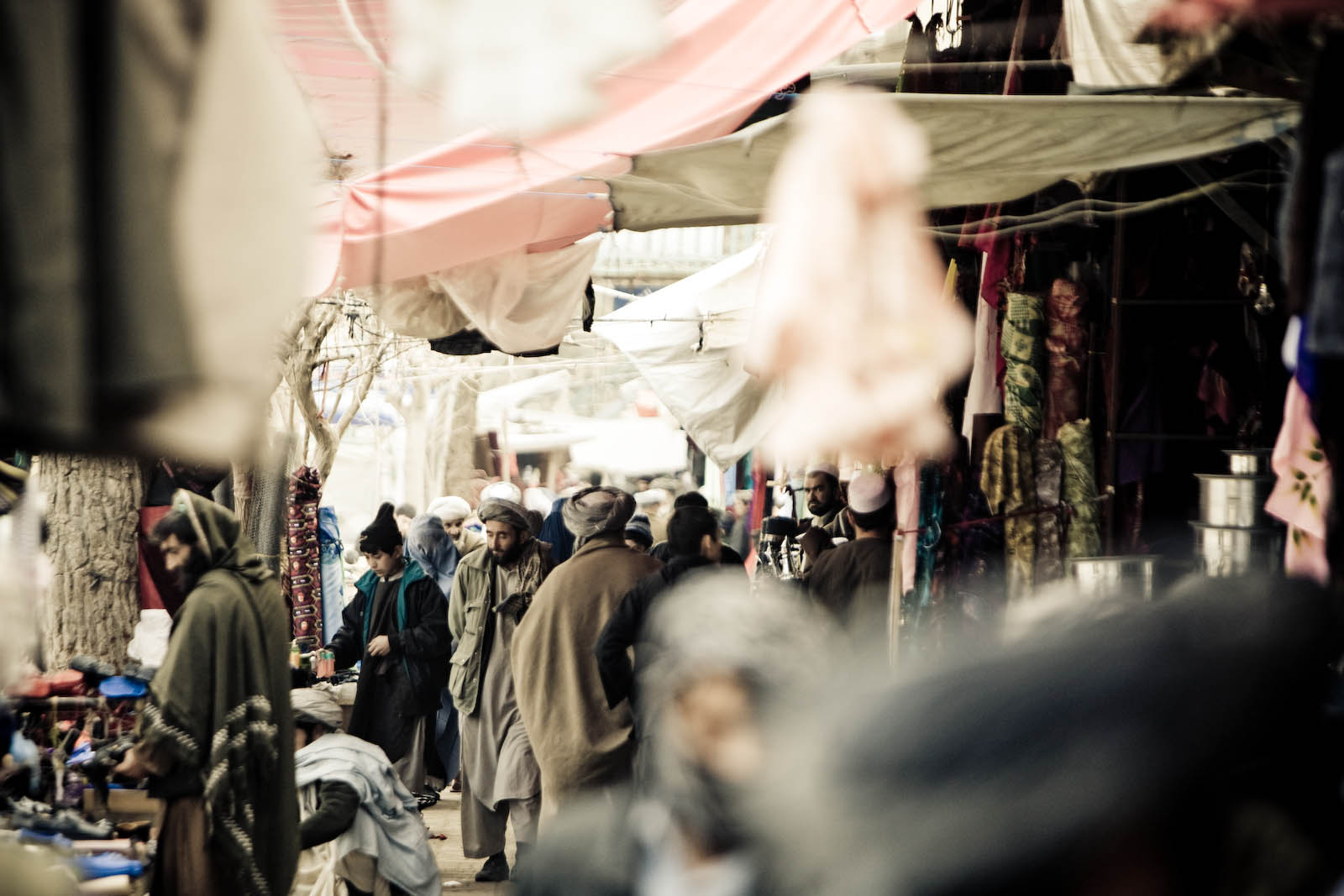
A market area in Maimana

During that time the city became the center of the Maimana Khanate and an important centre for commerce, as well as being the gateway to Turkistan from Herat and Iran. It served as an important cultural and trade centre for the whole region and served to connect various different states and peoples. Under the Uzbek rule, the city experienced a sudden renaissance, starting from the conquest of the area by Muhammad Shaibani and lasting all the way down to the Pashtun subjugation of the region. In 1876, under Sher Ali Khan, the city fell to the kingdom of Kabul and was put in ruins. As result, only ten percent of the population remained alive while a large part either died or left the city for other regions after the horrific slaughter.

In the 20th century, the city was once strongly walled with thick walls and towers and surrounded by a moat, but in the same century all this has been reduced to an anonymous mound. In 1934, the rebuilding of the city started, and in 1949 the northern parts of the old city were renewed, the old city citadel changed to a park. Maimana was the administrative center of Meymaneh Province until the disintegration of the province.

As part of the International Security Assistance Force operation in Afghanistan, a Provincial Reconstruction Team led by Norway formerly operated in the province. The team also included Latvian troops. On 18 March 2014, a suicide bomber detonated his explosives near the entrance to a busy market in Maimana, killing 15 people including women and children and injuring 27 others. The attack came ahead of the presidential elections on 5 April.

On 14 August 2021, Maimana was seized by Taliban fighters, becoming the twenty-second provincial capital to be captured in the wider 2021 Taliban offensive. In January 2022, some clashes were reported in the city.

== Demographics ==
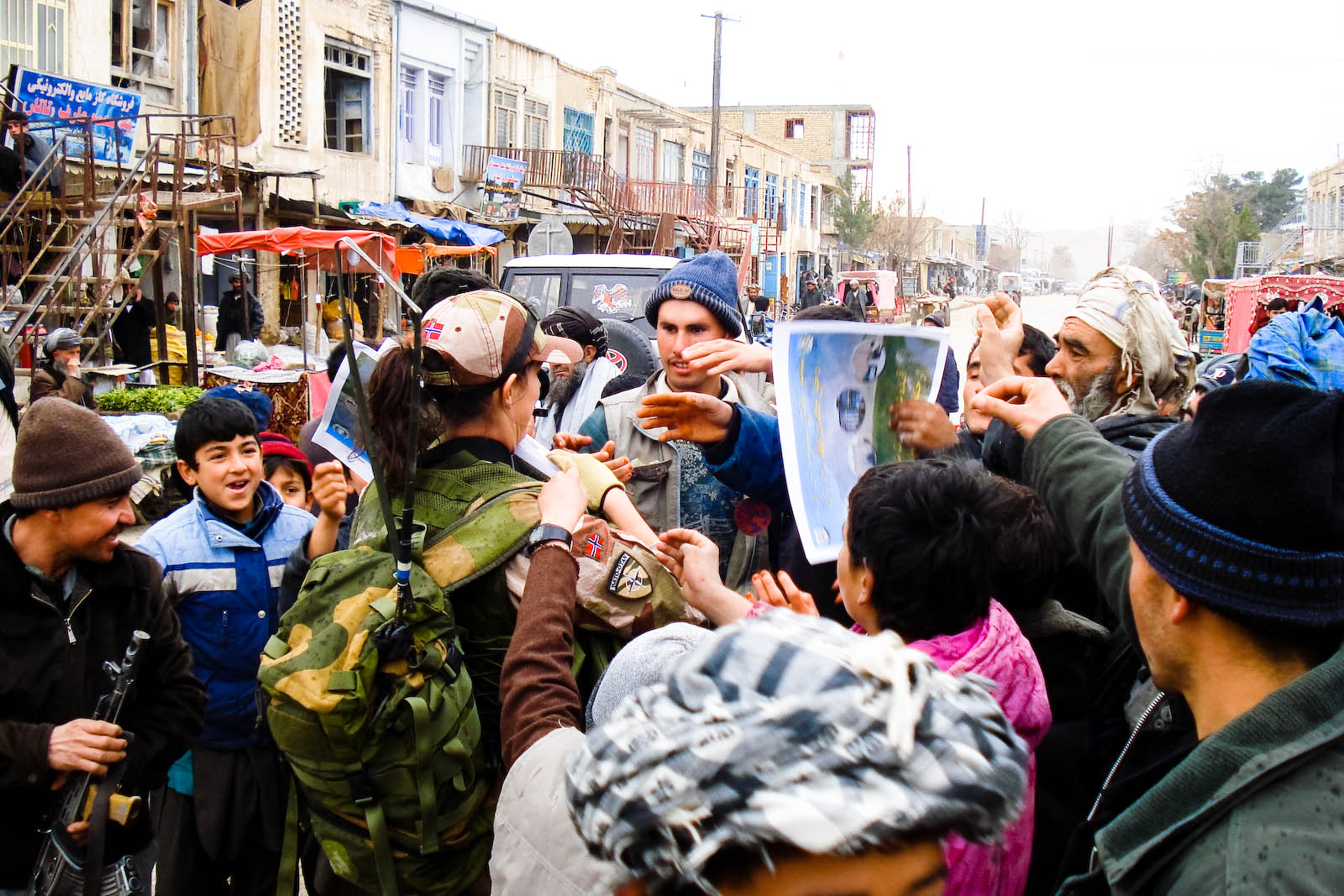
People of Maimana with a female Norwegian soldier in 2009

Maimana has an estimated population of 108,049 people. The city is divided into 10 districts covering a land area of 35 km^{2} (14 sq mi) or 3,461 ha (8,550 acres). In 2015 there were 16,560 dwelling units in the city.

During the 19th century, the population was estimated at 15,000–18,000 families (or roughly 75,000-95,000 individuals) and was assumed to be a dominantly Uzbek city due to the market language which was mostly Chagatai language. However, documents show it was a diverse city (as it is today). In 1958, the population was estimated to be 30,000. By 1979 this had risen to 38,250, and by 1982 to 56,973.

== Economy ==
Maimana is an important livestock centre in Afghanistan. The city serves an agricultural area irrigated from the Qeysar River and also handles the trade in Karakul sheep with nomads. In the 1970s, the wool and cotton processing industry was booming in the city. Maimana is a market for leather goods, silk, carpets, wheat, barley, melons and grapes. Some residents are now in the saffron business. Regarding drought in the area, the government recently built the Qosh Tepa Canal. This canal is expected to significantly increase agricultural lands in the area, and boost the economy of the northern Afghan cities such as Maimana.

== Transportation ==
The Maymana Airport is located 2 miles (3.2 km (2.0 mi)) west of Maimana in a valley surrounded by hills and a range of mountains with some peaks reaching 12,000 ft (3,700 m). It is about (39 km (24 mi)) southeast of the Afghanistan–Turkmenistan border and 103 km (64 mi) south of Andkhoy. It had direct flights to Herat as of May 2014. There is a rail way project planned, which is to connect by rail Maimana with Herat in the southwest and Mazar-i-Sharif in the northeast.

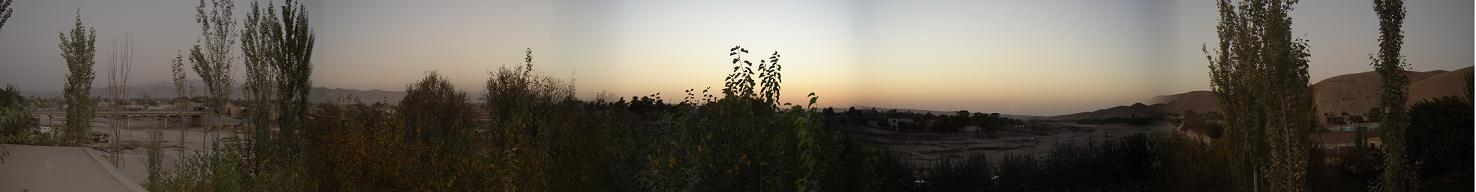
Panorama of Maymana
