= Kam Air Flight 904 =

2005 aircraft accident in Afghanistan

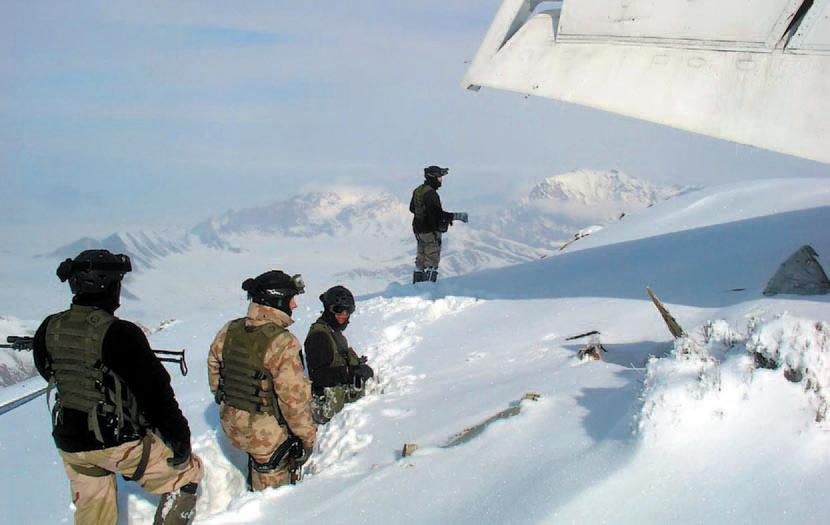
- Soldiers at the crash site next to the vertical stabilizer of the aircraft in the upper right corner

Accident
- Date: 3 February 2005
- Summary: Controlled flight into terrain for undetermined reasons
- Site: Pamir Mountains; 34°27′54.15″N 69°30′11.71″E

Aircraft
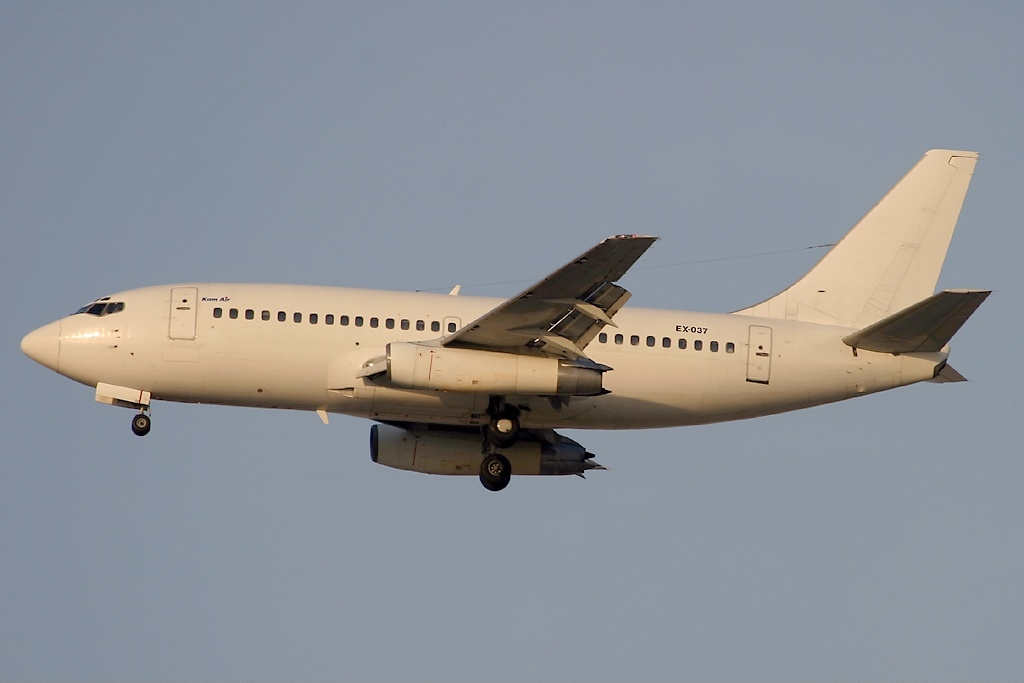
- EX-037, the aircraft involved in the accident, seen in 2004
- Aircraft type: Boeing 737-242
- Operator: Kam Air on behalf of Phoenix Aviation
- IATA flight No.: RQ904
- ICAO flight No.: KMF904
- Call sign: KAM AIR 904
- Registration: EX-037
- Flight origin: Herat Airport, Afghanistan
- Destination: Kabul International Airport, Afghanistan
- Occupants: 105
- Passengers: 97
- Crew: 8
- Fatalities: 105
- Survivors: 0

Kam Air Flight 904 was a scheduled passenger domestic flight from Herat Airport in Herat to Kabul International Airport in Afghanistan's capital Kabul. On 3 February 2005, the aircraft crashed in mountainous terrain, killing all 97 passengers and 8 crew on board.

The incident took place shortly after 4:00 p.m. local time (UTC+4:30) when the Kam Air Boeing 737-200 operated by Phoenix Aviation went missing on approach to Kabul. The area was experiencing a heavy snowstorm at the time. The wreckage was found 4 days later and all occupants were confirmed dead.

The crash is the deadliest air disaster in the history of Afghanistan.

== Accident ==
The aircraft lost communication during the worst winter snowstorm for 5 years. The cause of the loss of communication and the subsequent crash is unknown. Taliban leader Mullah Dadullah stated that his guerrilla fighters had not shot down the plane and expressed sadness at the crash. Air traffic control for the Kabul area was provided by the International Security Assistance Force (ISAF).

At the time of the accident, there was no established intra-governmental agency plan in Afghanistan to deal with a major aircraft crash. Initially, it was proposed that the Ministry of Transportation be responsible for not only the investigation but also human remains identification and recovery and wreckage recovery. When the logic of this concept fell apart because of the small size of the MOT and its almost total lack of resources, these duties were divided among the Ministry of Defense and Ministry of Health (human remains), the Ministry of the Interior (wreckage recovery), and the MOT (the actual accident investigation).

== Recovery operation and investigation ==
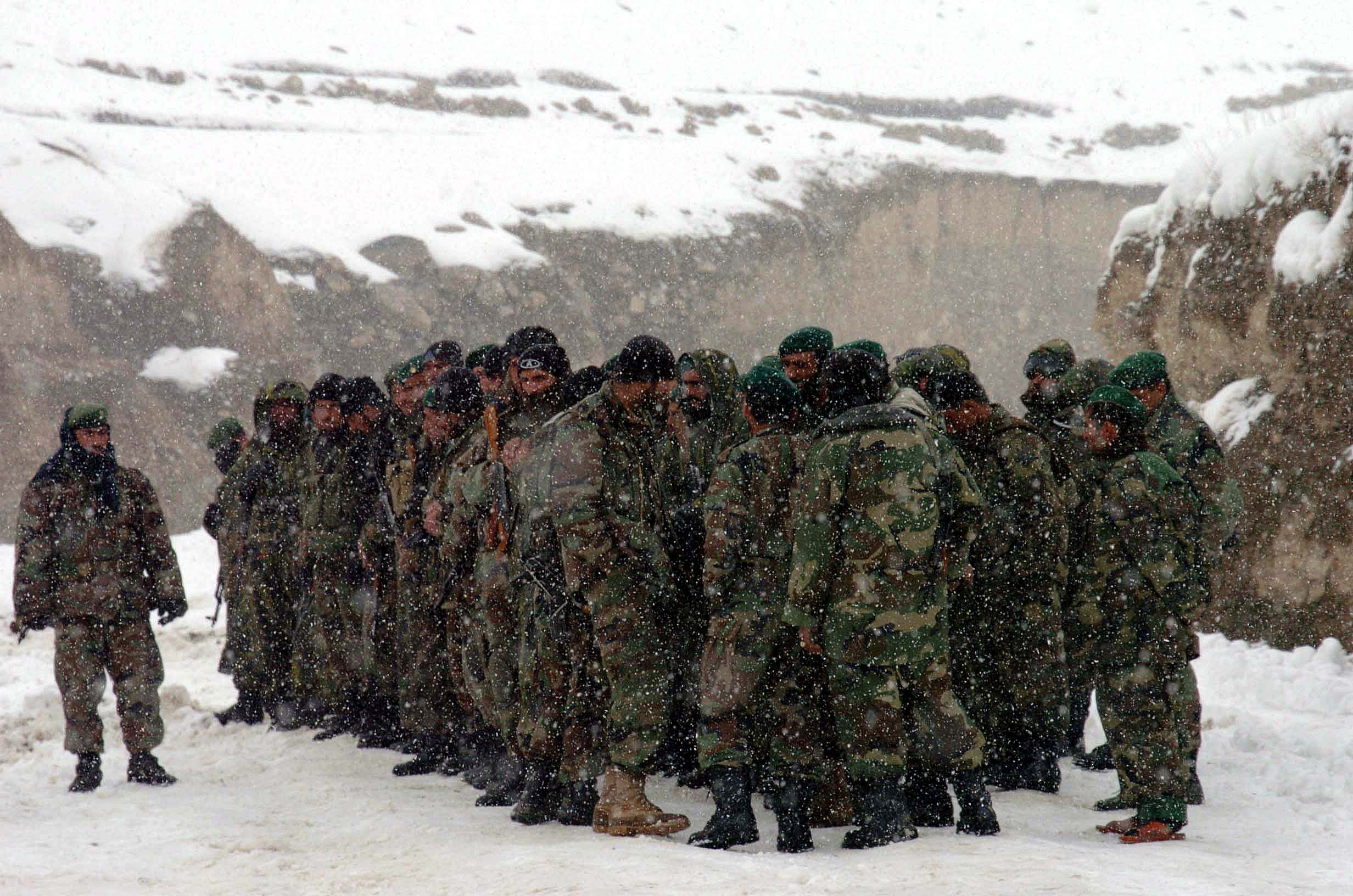
A platoon of the Afghan National Army during a rescue operation in February 2005.

A rescue operation was launched under atrocious weather conditions by the ISAF and Afghan National Army (ANA), and two Dutch Apache helicopters sighted the tail of the plane at around 9:30 a.m. UTC.

The ISAF made numerous unsuccessful rescue attempts by helicopters of victims presumed to be alive. When those attempts failed, the Afghan Ministry of Defense ordered the ANA's Central Corps to assemble a team to attempt a rescue. The Afghan National Army Commando responded on foot but were forced to leave due to a snowstorm. On the fourth day after the crash, an ISAF rescue team was able to reach the crash site and confirmed that all passengers and crew were dead.

The crash site was at an altitude of 11,000 feet (3,400 m) on the peak of the Chaperi Mountain, 20 miles (17 nmi; 32 km) east of the Afghan capital of Kabul.

The helicopter crew confirmed the wreckage site with the aircraft sensors and reported back their find. The crash site was on a high mountain ridge called Cheri Ghar at some 3,000 metres (9,800 ft). The ridge was a daunting place; sheer on one side, steeply sloping on the other with deep snowfields, and swept by high winds or covered in freezing fog. The snow hid any local tracks or paths and the approach roads from nearby villages were impassable to vehicles, despite several attempts by ISAF and ANA patrols to find a way to the summit. The winter weather did not give another opportunity until 7 February when a window of clear weather allowed an ISAF Spanish Cougar helicopter to set down a 5-man team of Slovenian mountain rescue troops onto the ridge summit. Pushing on through the waist-deep snow and conscious of the possible mine threat, the team reached the site. Although the team found no human remains, the badly broken up debris scattered along the ridgeline and the extreme conditions made it very unlikely that anyone had survived the crash.

It was discovered that all 105 passengers and crew on board were killed, and the plane was completely destroyed. The flight data recorder was found after an extensive and extremely difficult search and turned over to US National Transportation Safety Board analysis. The recorder did not contain any valid data from the flight. The cockpit voice recorder, which would provide crucial information about the actions of the flight crew prior to the impact, was never located.

The accident site itself was compact horizontally, but not vertically. The aircraft struck a ridge line on an easterly heading near the crest of the mountain about 50 feet (15 m) down from the top. The final flight path probably had some amount of upward vector to it, because the fuselage forward of the wing box was propelled, in fragments, over the crest and fell over the cliff side into the valley below. The actual wreckage documentation during five site visits was difficult because most of the parts were either buried under several feet of snow and inaccessible, outside the mine-free cordon and inaccessible, or down the cliff side and, therefore, also inaccessible to all without mountain climbing training. The most prominent and recognizable piece of wreckage present was the vertical stabilizer and a small portion of the rear fuselage. Most of the visible wreckage was located between two stacked-stone, roofless structures that were observation posts used by Mujahadeen fighters to monitor Soviet troop movements in the Kabul valley during the 1980s. Within a 200-foot (67 yd; 61 m) circle, after a lot of arduous snow removal, investigators identified portions of both engines, both wings, the left main landing gear assembly, many aft galley components, the horizontal stabilizer, human remains and personal effects, and much miscellaneous debris. Some material, such as an escape slide and some right engine components, were located outside the landmine-free area. These items were documented with binoculars and digital camera zoom features.

The investigative team faced very challenging weather conditions, difficult terrain, and potential landmine hazards. The evidence recovered from the site was insufficient to determine a definite cause for the crash, but the location suggested that the crew had descended below the minimum descent altitude for the phase of the approach that they were in. Without the cockpit voice recorder, survivors, witnesses, or a valid flight data recording, the investigation stalled. In 2006, the Civil Aviation Operation of the Ministry of Transport of Afghanistan released their final report concluding that the plane flew into terrain below the ideal approach path, most likely as a result of pilot error.

== Kam Air ==
Kam Air is a private airline established in 2003 operating a fleet of leased Boeing and Antonov aircraft on both domestic and international routes. The plane that crashed during flight 904 was a Boeing 737-200 registered in Kyrgyzstan as EX-037, which was originally delivered to Nordair in 1980. It had been leased by Kam Air and operated by Phoenix Aviation, a firm based at Sharjah, United Arab Emirates.

== See also ==
- Controlled Flight into terrain (CFIT)
- Pamir Airways Flight 112 where the aircraft was lost in very poor weather conditions on approach to Kabul International Airport, killing all 44 on board.
- 1998 Ariana Afghan Airlines Boeing 727 crash the aircraft flew into a mountain in poor weather conditions killing all 45 on board
