= List of defunct airlines of Afghanistan =

This is a list of defunct airlines of Afghanistan.

Airline	Image	IATA	ICAO	Callsign	Commenced operations	Ceased operations	Notes
Afghan Jet International					2014	2016	
Aryana Airlines					1955	1956	Renamed/merged to Ariana Afghan Airlines
Bakhtar Afghan Airlines		BJ	BYJ		1985	1988	Renamed/merged to Bakhtar Alwatana
Bakhtar Alwatana		FG	FGA		1967	1985	Renamed Bakhtar Afghan Airlines
Balkh Airlines			BHI	SHARIF	1996	1997	
Bamiyan Airlines			BHI		1997	1997	
East Horizon Airlines		EA	EHN		2013	2015	
Kabul Air			KBL		2007	2011	
MarcoPolo Airways			MCP	MARCOPOLO	2003	2004	
Khyber Afghan Airlines			KHY	KHYBER	2001	2018	
Pamir Airways		PM	PIR		1995	2011	
Photros Air			KHP		2006	2007	
Safi Airways		4Q	SFW	SAFI AIRWAYS	2007	2016	

== See also ==
- List of airlines of Afghanistan
- List of airports in Afghanistan
