= Pamir Airways Flight 112 =

2010 aviation accident

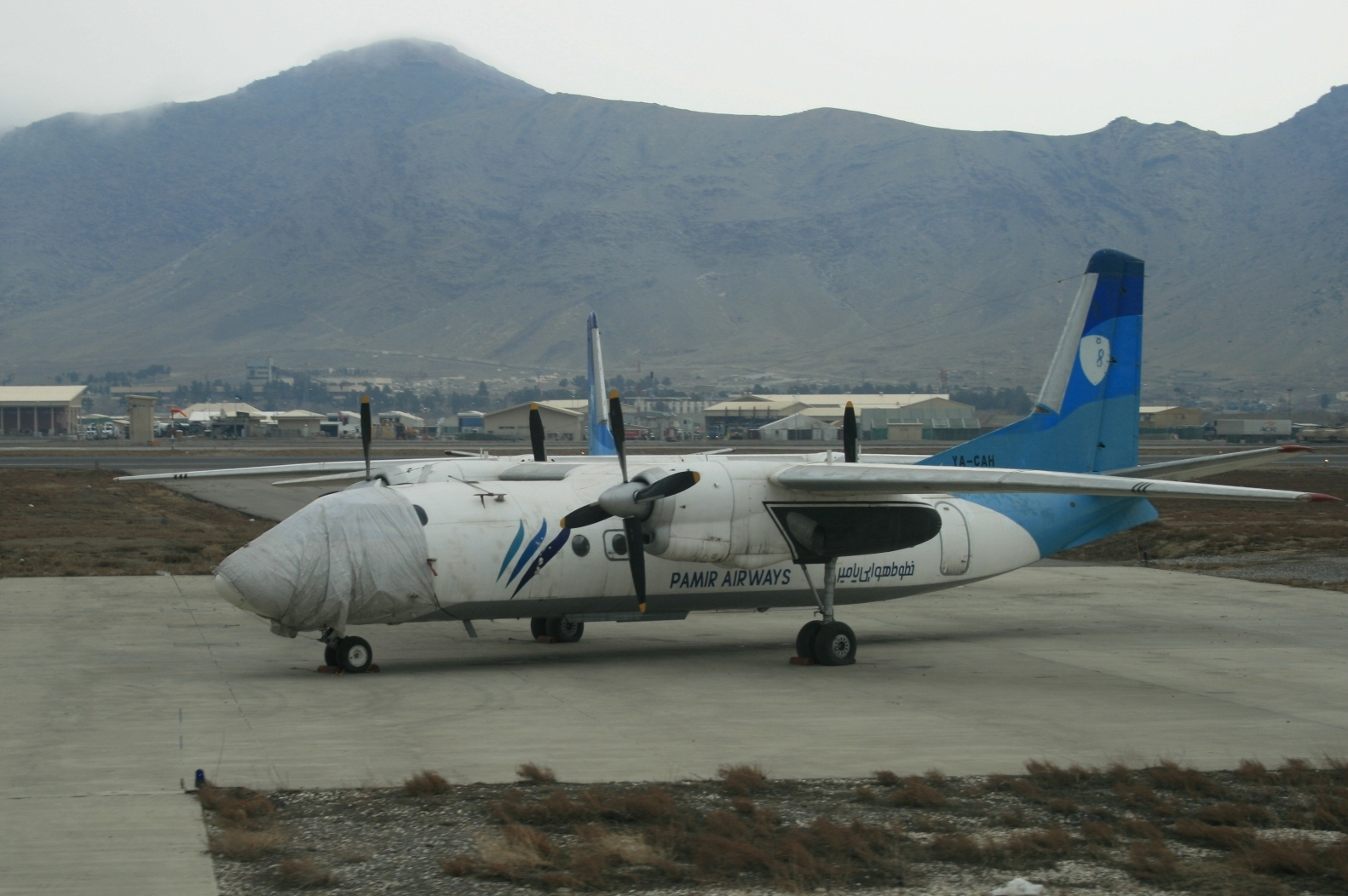
- A Pamir Airways Antonov An-24RV at Kabul International Airport (2011)

Accident
- Date: 17 May 2010
- Summary: Controlled flight into terrain due to pilot error and ATC error in bad weather
- Site: Shakardara District, 20 kilometres (12 mi; 11 nmi) from Kabul International Airport, Kabul, Afghanistan; 35°18′13″N 69°3′15″E

Aircraft
- Aircraft type: Antonov An-24
- Operator: Pamir Airways
- Call sign: PAMIR 112
- Registration: YA-PIS
- Flight origin: Kunduz Airport, Kunduz
- Destination: Kabul International Airport, Kabul
- Occupants: 44
- Passengers: 39
- Crew: 5
- Fatalities: 44
- Survivors: 0

Pamir Airways Flight 112 was a scheduled domestic passenger flight from Kunduz Airport, Kunduz to Kabul International Airport in Kabul, Afghanistan. On 17 May 2010, the flight operated by an Antonov An-24 crashed into terrain shortly before it was scheduled to land in Kabul, killing all 39 passengers and 5 crew.

== Aircraft ==
The aircraft involved was an Antonov An-24, manufacturer's serial number (MSN) 27307903, registration YA-PIS. The aircraft first flew in 1972 and had been bought by Pamir Airways in February 2010, having spent some time in storage in Bulgaria.

== The flight ==
Flight 112 departed Kunduz at 8:30 am local time (UTC+04:30) and all contact with the flight, including on radar, was lost 10 minutes later. Reports stated that the plane crashed in Salang Pass, 100 kilometres (62 mi) north of Kabul International Airport, at a speed of approximately 400 kilometres per hour (220 kn; 250 mph). The wreckage was eventually located only 20 kilometres (12 mi) from Kabul. The weather conditions were reported as poor, with a senior military commander describing the weather as "...very bad. It is snowing. There is flooding."

An inquest in the United Kingdom stated that the accident report determined that the cause of the accident was the failure of the captain to maintain adequate clearance from terrain. The crew had contacted air traffic control to ask for permission to descend. Air traffic control had denied this request, however the crew decided to descend regardless. Air traffic control did not warn the crew they were descending too quickly and into danger. Additionally, the crew misunderstood a ground proximity warning system alert, either due to language problems or because of previous false alerts.

== Rescue attempts ==
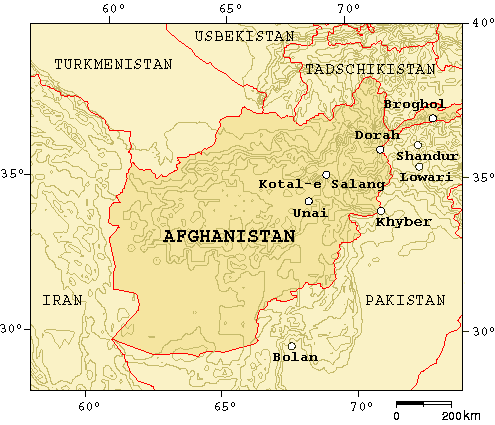
Location of Salang Pass (Kotal-e Sālang)

It was reported that the Afghan government had requested assistance from NATO to locate the aircraft. The organisation sent search planes to the last known position of the An-24, but they were forced to turn back 4 miles from the believed crash site, due to bad weather. The colonel in charge of the southern stretch of the pass said that "the only way they can search is on foot. The helicopters can't get in." The search for the aircraft resumed on the morning of May 18, and the "crash area" was said to be located later that day, according to Yalda Natiq, the transport ministry's head of communications.

However, initial reports that the wreckage of the aircraft had been located late on Tuesday evening (May 18) proved to be false, and the search continued late on Wednesday, May 19. Afghan police, local people and International Security Assistance Force (ISAF) helicopters were involved in the search. The rugged, mountainous terrain, fog and snow again hampered the search. On the 20th of May, it was announced that the tail section of the aircraft had been spotted.

On May 21, the wreckage was reached by rescuers. "Parts of the crashed plane are lying in front of me. There are a number of bodies scattered around here," acting transport and civil aviation minister Mohammadullah Batash reported by telephone from the crash site, which is 20 kilometres (12 mi) from Kabul. It had been thought that the Antonov An-24 plane came down around 100 kilometres (62 mi) north of the capital. "It is too soon to say that no one has survived. But so far we cannot see anyone alive and the situation here is extreme – cold, snow, wind" he said. ISAF said the crash site was located at an altitude of approximately 13,500 feet (4,100 m) in the Shakardara District of Kabul province.

== Passengers and crew ==
Besides a number of Afghan nationals, six foreigners, including three Britons, were also on board. One American passenger was reported by a State Department source. On May 21, chief aviation investigator Ghulam Farooq reported that an unknown number of nationals from Australia, Pakistan and Tajikistan were also among the eight foreign passengers aboard the plane. It was reported that up to three Australians may have been on board. As of May 22, the report remains unconfirmed.

Nationality	Passengers	Crew	Total
Afghan	?	?	33
British	3	–	3
Turkish	2	–	2
Tajik	?	?	3
American	2	–	2
Pakistani	1	–	1
Total	39	5	44

== See also ==
- Kam Air Flight 904 where the aircraft struck the peak of the Chaperi Mountain, 20 miles east of Kabul International Airport.
- 1998 Ariana Afghan Airlines Boeing 727 crash
