= Kam Air =

Airline of Afghanistan

Kam Air کام ایر

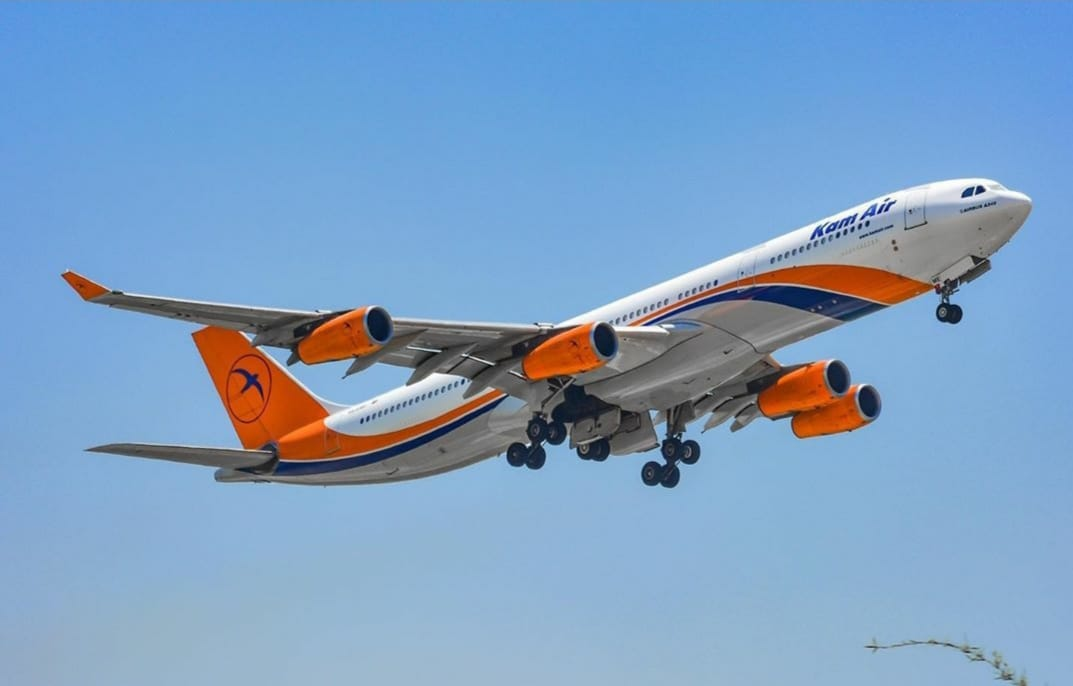
- Kam Air Airbus A340-300
IATA	ICAO	Call sign
RQ	KMF	KAMGAR
- Founded: 30 July 2003; 23 years ago
- Operating bases: Kabul International Airport
- Secondary hubs: Mazar-i-Sharif International Airport
- Frequent-flyer program: Orange Miles
- Fleet size: 12
- Destinations: 13
- Headquarters: Kabul, Afghanistan
- Key people: Zmarai Kamgar (founder and Chairman); Ravil Aksianov (CEO)
- Employees: 800 (2024)
- Website: www.kamair.com

Kam Air is the largest private Afghan airline. Founded in 2003, Kam Air has 11 aircraft and a workforce of over 800 people, operating scheduled domestic passenger services throughout Afghanistan and international services to destinations in Central Asia, South Asia, and West Asia. Its hub is located at Kabul International Airport.

== History ==
Kam Air's head office in Kabul

=== Foundation and early years ===
Kam Air was the first private commercial airline established in Afghanistan by the owner and founder of Kamgar Group, Zamarai Kamgar, an Afghan businessman. Kam Air's Operator Certificate (AOC Nr. 001) was issued in August 2003 by the Ministry of Transport and Civil Aviation (MoTCA) of Afghanistan. Kam Air was registered with International Civil Aviation Organization (ICAO) three letter airline code, KMF, International Air Transport Association (IATA) two letter code, RQ and financial code 384.

The first flight of Kam Air was operated from Kabul to Herat and Mazar-i-Sharif in November 2003 with a Boeing 727-200, while the first international flight was inaugurated in May 2004 between Kabul and Dubai.

On 25 January 2013, the United States blacklisted Kam Air citing a United States Army investigation that the airline smuggled opium on civilian flights to Tajikistan, an allegation denied by the airline and the Afghan government. The ban was suspended a month later.

=== Development since 2020 ===
On 24 February 2021, Kam Air operated Afghanistan's first ever all-female crew flight. The airline's first and so far its only commercial female Afghan pilot, then 22-year-old Mohadese Mirzaee, joined now former Captain Veronica Borysova from Ukraine in piloting the Boeing 737-500 from Hamid Karzai International Airport in Kabul to Herat. The event made global headlines and was first covered by Josh Cahill and later featured on BBC News, Deutsche Welle and the Business Insider. The flight took 90 minutes.

Due to the collapse of the Islamic Republic of Afghanistan, all civilian services in the country were temporarily suspended on 15 August 2021. Kam Air flew some of its planes to Iran to prevent damage during the turmoil. However, domestic flights restarted on 5 September 2021. International flights were also later resumed.

=== Partnership with PIA (Sep 2026) ===
Pakistan International Airlines (PIA) and Kam Air have signed an interline agreement to improve air connectivity between Afghanistan and destinations in the Middle East. As per the agreement, passengers can book their entire itinerary under a unified reservation, avoiding the need to purchase separate tickets for each leg. Checked luggage from Kabul will be transferred at Islamabad airport to connecting PIA flights, while Afghan travelers heading to the Gulf could bypass immigration clearance in Pakistan as long as they remained airside in transit.

== Frequent flyer program ==
Kam Air's frequent flyer program includes a loyalty membership called the Orange Miles.

== Destinations ==
As of January 2025, Kam Air serves the following destinations:

Country	City	Airport
Afghanistan	Herat	Khwaja Abdullah Ansari International Airport
Afghanistan	Kabul	Kabul International Airport
Afghanistan	Kandahar	Kandahar International Airport
Afghanistan	Khost	Khost International Airport
Afghanistan	Mazar-i-Sharif	Mawlana Jalaluddin Mohammad Balkhi International Airport
India	Delhi	Indira Gandhi International Airport
Iran	Mashad	Mashhad Shahid Hashminejad International Airport
Iran	Tehran	Mehrabad International Airport
Kuwait	Kuwait	Kuwait International Airport
Pakistan	Islamabad	Islamabad International Airport
Qatar	Doha	Hamad International Airport
Saudi Arabia	Jeddah	King Abdulaziz International Airport
Saudi Arabia	Riyadh	King Khalid International Airport
Turkey	Istanbul	Istanbul Airport
United Arab Emirates	Abu Dhabi	Zayed International Airport
United Arab Emirates	Dubai	Dubai International Airport
Uzbekistan	Tashkent	Tashkent International Airport

=== Codeshare agreements ===
Kam Air has codeshares with the following airlines:

- Air Arabia

=== Interline agreements ===
- Air India
- APG Airlines
- Emirates
- Etihad Airlines
- Flynas
- Malaysia Airlines
- Pakistan International Airlines
- Saudia
- Turkish Airlines
- Uzbekistan Airways
- Qatar Airways

== Fleet ==
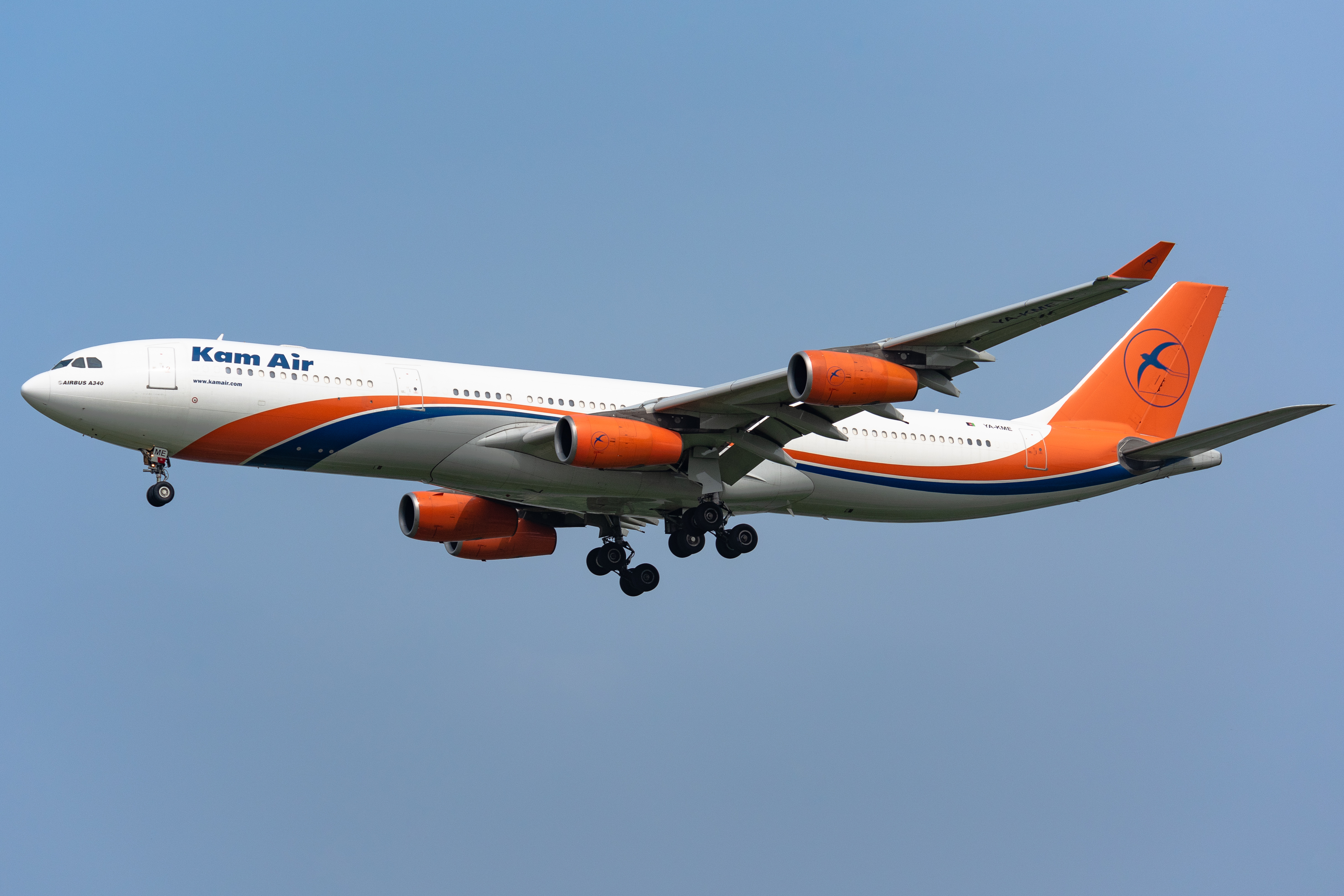
A Kam Air Airbus A340-300

=== Current fleet ===
As of August 2025 Kam Air has the following aircraft in its fleet:

Kam Air fleet
Aircraft	In service	Orders	Passengers	Notes
Aircraft	In service	Orders	Total	Notes
Airbus A340-300	5	—	346	YA-KMU YA-KME YA-KMH
Boeing 737-300	6	—	—	YA-KML YA-KMK YA-KMJ
Boeing 737-500	1	—	126	YA-KMN
Total	12			

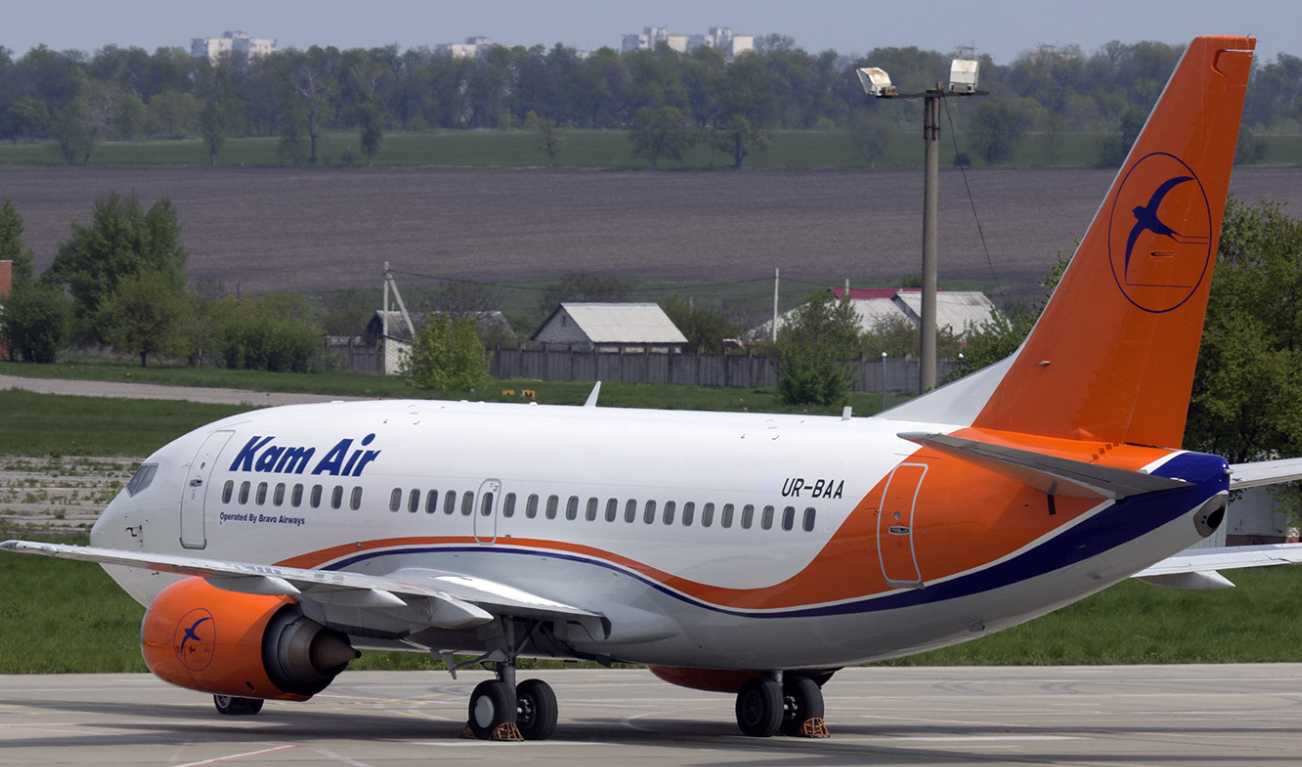
Kam Air 737-500 operated by Bravo Airways

In August 2021, Kam Air sent an unspecified number of its aircraft to Iran for temporary storage amidst safety concerns following the fall of Kabul and the resulting chaos that surrounded the city's airport.

=== Former fleet ===
The airline previously operated the following aircraft:

- 2 ATR 42 (2018–2021)
- 2 Airbus A320-200 (2011–2014) leased from Bahrain Air and Nordic Aviation Capital (NAC)
- 6 Boeing 737-200 (2004–2010) leased from Eastok Avia and Phoenix Aviation
- 1 Boeing 737-400 (2019–2020) leased from Ukrainian Wings
- 3 Boeing 737-800 (2006–2008, 2017) leased from AirExplore and Pegasus
- 2 Boeing 747-200 (2012–2015) operated by The Cargo Airlines
- 2 Boeing 767-200 (2005, 2007–2017) (one leased from Phoenix Aviation)
- 1 Boeing 767-300 (2021) leased from Ukrainian Wings
- 2 Douglas DC-8-60/70 (2010–)
- 4 Fokker 100 (2016) leased from Bek Air
- 2 McDonnell Douglas MD-82 (2008–)
- 5 McDonnell Douglas MD-83 (2010–) (three leased from Bravo Airways)
- 2 McDonnell Douglas MD-87 (2012–2024)
- 2 Saab 340 (2016–2018) leased from Air Urga

== Accidents and incidents ==
- On 3 February 2005, Kam Air Flight 904, a Boeing 737-200 operated by Phoenix Aviation, flying from Herat International Airport in western Afghanistan, vanished from radar screens on approach to Kabul International Airport in poor weather. The disappearance sparked a massive Afghan army search operation for the 96 passengers and eight crew. The wreckage of the plane was found on 5 February 2005 in the mountains east of Kabul. All 104 people aboard were killed.
- On 11 August 2010, Douglas DC-8-63F YA-VIC suffered a tailstrike on take-off from Manston Airport, United Kingdom, destroying an approach light. The aircraft was operating an international cargo flight to Buenos Aires, Argentina, via the Cape Verde Islands. The incident was caused by the aircraft being 25,700 lb (11,700 kg) overweight due to excess fuel load and misestimating of cargo mass. After being informed of the mishap, the crew continued to Cape Verde. An inspection there confirmed the tailstrike, though analysis of the strike indicator showed the plane was still safe. The incident was investigated by the Air Accidents Investigation Branch, which made various safety recommendations. Kam Air was subsequently banned from operating within the European Union. The three crew involved were also dismissed, and Kam Air announced that it would withdraw its two DC-8s from service.
- In January 2018, Kam Air reported that nine staff members were killed in a Taliban attack on a hotel in Kabul – seven Ukrainian employees and two Kam air employees from Venezuela. Kam Air had rented 50 rooms for their foreign staff at the hotel, described as one of Kabul's "most heavily guarded." Five were pilots, and four were crew members. Afterwards, over 50 of the airline's foreign workers left the country, and by 26 January, five of its nine aircraft sat idle due to lack of staffing. A large number of daily flights were also being canceled for that reason.
- On 22 September 2025, a 13-year old stowaway from Afghanistan was discovered on the landing gear compartment of a Kam Air flight that arrived at Indira Gandhi International Airport in Delhi from Kabul. The boy, who said he wanted to travel to Iran out of curiosity but was unaware that he had taken a flight to India, was repatriated on a return flight that same day.
