= East Horizon Airlines =

Afghan airline (2013–2018)

IATA	ICAO	Call sign
~~EA~~	EHN	—
- Founded: 2013
- Commenced operations: December 2013
- Ceased operations: September 2018
- Hubs: Herat International Airport; Hamid Karzai International Airport
- Fleet size: 3
- Destinations: 11
- Website: flyeasthorizon.com

East Horizon Airlines was an Afghan regional airline.

== History ==
The airline began operations in December 2013. As of May 2014 the airline had regularly scheduled flights to nine airports within Afghanistan from its hubs at Herat and Kabul airports. As of September 2018, the airline suspended all operations.

== Destinations ==
As of May 2014 the airline served the following destinations:

Hub
Future
Terminated destination

City	Country	Airport	Refs
Kabul	Afghanistan	Kabul International Airport	
Herat	Afghanistan	Herat Airport	
Bamyan	Afghanistan	Bamyan Airport	
Chaghcharan	Afghanistan	Chaghcharan Airport	
Fayzabad	Afghanistan	Fayzabad Airport	
Farah	Afghanistan	Farah Airport	
Khost	Afghanistan	Khost Airport	
Kunduz	Afghanistan	Kunduz Airport	
Sharana	Afghanistan	Sharana Airstrip	
Maymana	Afghanistan	Maymana Airport	
Zaranj	Afghanistan	Zaranj Airport	

== Fleet ==
As of May 2014 the East Horizon Airlines fleet consisted of the following aircraft:

East Horizon Airlines
Aircraft	In Service	Passengers		
Aircraft	In Service	C	Y	Total
McDonnell Douglas MD-82	1			
Xian MA60	1			
Antonov An-24RV	1			
Total	3			
