= Pamir =

Pamir may refer to:

== Geographical features ==
- Pamir Mountains, a mountain range in Central Asia
  - Pamir-Alay, a mountain system in Tajikistan, Kyrgyzstan and Uzbekistan, part of the Pamir Mountains
- A pamir (valley) is a high plateau or valley surrounded by mountains
  - Great Pamir, a high valley in the Wakhan, on the border of Afghanistan and Tajikistan
  - Little Pamir, a high valley in the Wakhan, Afghanistan
  - Taghdumbash Pamir, a high valley in the south west of Tashkurgan Tajik Autonomous County, in Xinjiang, China
- Pamir River, on the border of Tajikistan and Afghanistan

== Other uses ==
- Pamir (ship), a German sailing ship
- Pamir Airways, based in Afghanistan
- Pamir languages
- Pamir Alevism (Türkistan Alevîliği), a sect of Batini-Ismailis in Turkestan

== See also ==
- Pax Pamir, a board game set in 19th century Afghanistan
