= Pamir Airways =

1995–2011 airline in Afghanistan

IATA	ICAO	Call sign
PM	PIR	PAMIR
- Founded: 1994
- Commenced operations: May 1995
- Ceased operations: 2011
- Hubs: Kabul International Airport
- Fleet size: 5 (upon closure)
- Destinations: 10 (upon closure)
- Headquarters: Kabul, Afghanistan
- Key people: Sherkhan Farnood (Chairman)
- Website: pamirairways.af

Pamir Airways was a privately owned airline headquartered in Kabul, Afghanistan, operating scheduled passenger flights out of Kabul International Airport. The company name is derived from the Pamir Mountains and translates "roof of the world".

== History ==
As the first private airline in Afghanistan before the Taliban takeover, Pamir Airways was issued an Air Operator's Certificate in 1994 by the authorities then in charge of civil aviation in the Islamic State of Afghanistan. Flight operations were launched in 1995 with an initial fleet of one Boeing 707-300 and two Antonov An-12 aircraft.

In April 2008, Pamir Airways was taken over by a group of Afghan businessmen led by Sherkhan Farnood, the president of the Afghanistan Chamber of Commerce & Industries and former chairman of Kabul Bank, who subsequently became chairman of the airline. Following the investment, Pamir Airways received a loan for $98 million from Kabul Bank, which was later exposed as one having indescribably poor lending standards (e.g. little to no interest required, no collateral required and repayment essentially optional). An effort was made to re-organize the Pamir assets, including its aging fleet of grounded planes, which could not be sold at high enough prices to reclaim the funds, though. As a consequence, the license of the airline was withdrawn, officially due to the poor safety record, on 19 March 2011.

== Destinations ==
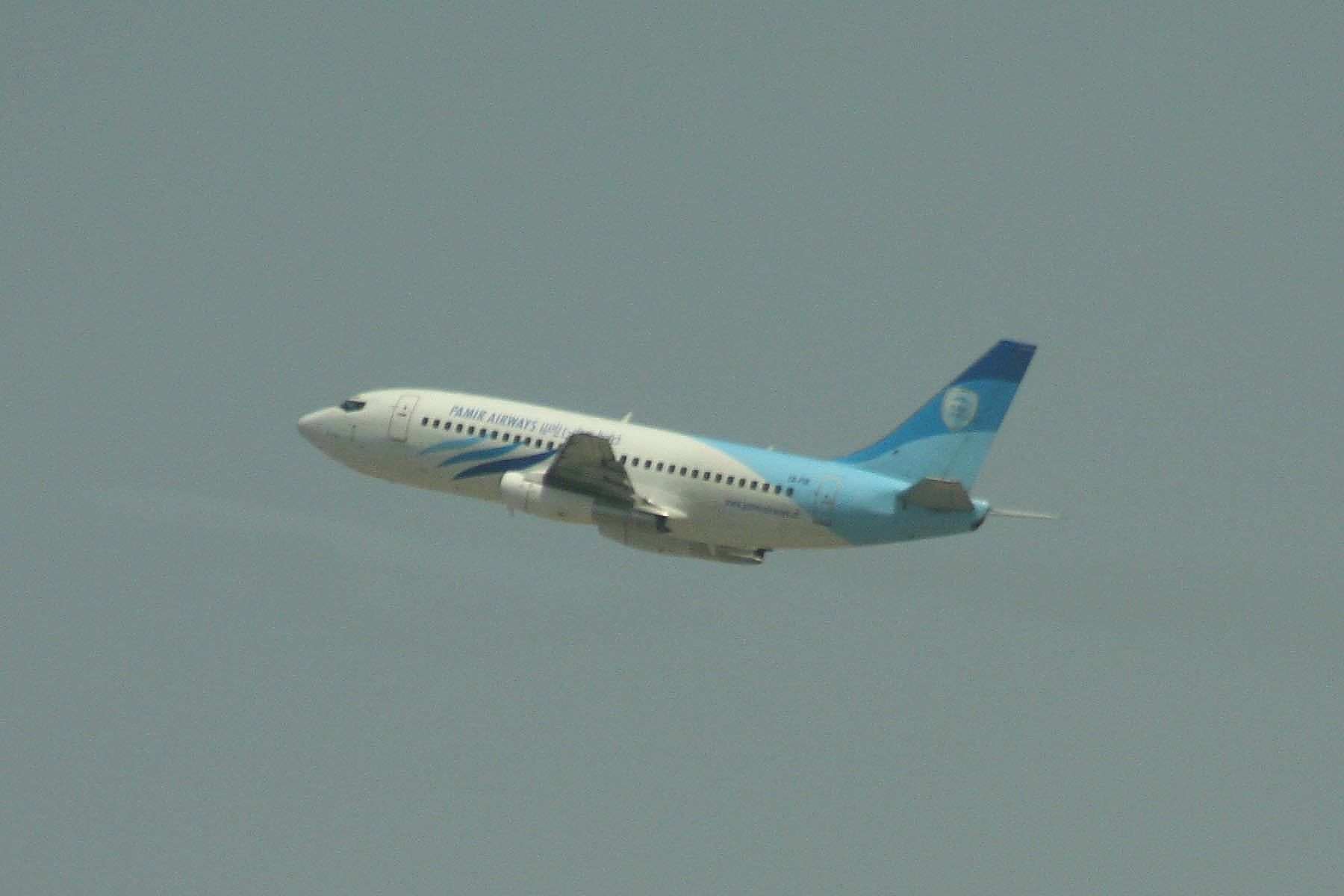
A Pamir Airways Boeing 737-200 departs Dubai in 2010.

Upon closure, Pamir Airways operated scheduled services to the following destinations:

Country	City	Airport	Notes
Afghanistan	Herat	Herat Airfield	
Afghanistan	Kabul	Kabul International Airport	Base
Afghanistan	Kandahar	Kandahar Airport	
Afghanistan	Lashkar Gah	Bost Airport	
Afghanistan	Mazar-i-Sharif	Mazar-i-Sharif Airport	
India	Delhi	Indira Gandhi International Airport	
Saudi Arabia	Jeddah	King Abdulaziz International Airport	
Saudi Arabia	Riyadh	King Khalid International Airport	
Tajikistan	Dushanbe	Dushanbe Airport	
United Arab Emirates	Dubai	Dubai International Airport	

During the Hajj season, Pamir Airways played a major role in taking Afghan pilgrims to Saudi Arabia (9,000 in 2004 and 15,000 in 2005).

== Fleet ==
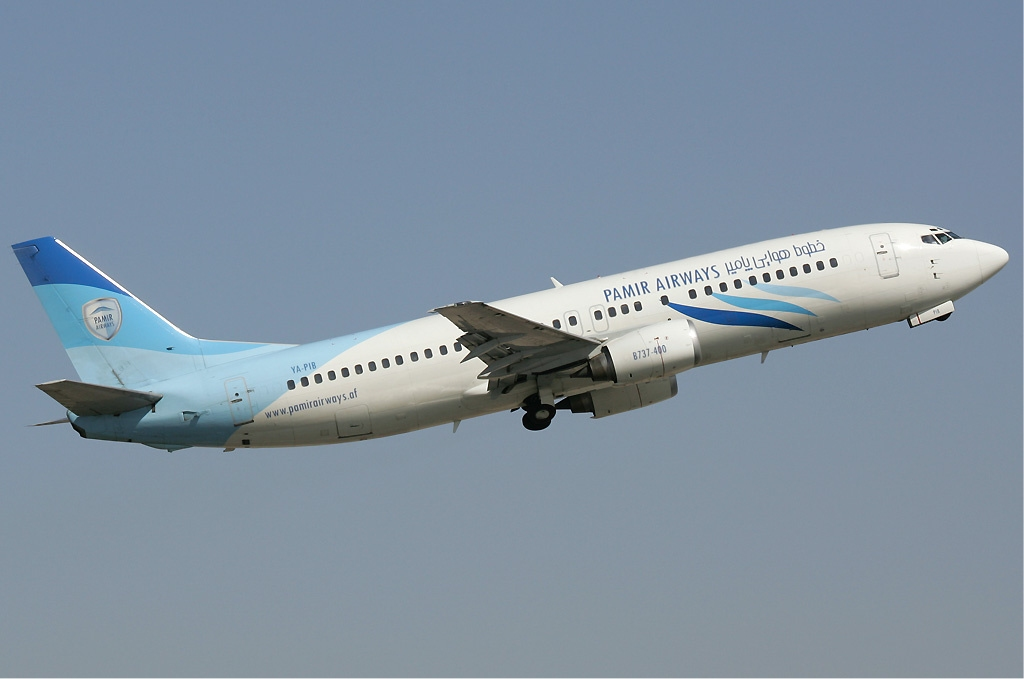
A Pamir Airways Boeing 737-400 shortly after take-off at Dubai International Airport in 2009.

Over the years, Pamir Airways operated the following aircraft types:

Pamir Airways Fleet
Aircraft	Introduced	Retired	Notes
Antonov An-12	1995	unknown	
Antonov An-24	unknown	2010	
Boeing 707-320	1995	unknown	One of the first aircraft types operated by the airline
Boeing 737-200	2008	2011	1 remained in fleet upon closure
Boeing 737-400	2009	2011	4 remained in fleet upon closure
McDonnell Douglas DC-10-15	2005	unknown	

== Incidents and accidents ==
- On 17 May 2010, Pamir Airways Flight 112, an Antonov An-24, crashed into Salang Pass, 100 km north of Kabul, killing all 39 passengers and 5 crew. The plane was en route from Kunduz Airport to Kabul, when it suddenly disappeared from radar.
