= Mohadese Mirzaee =

First female commercial pilot from Afghanistan

Mohadese Mirzaee (Dari: محدثه میرزایی; born 1998) is an Afghan pilot who became the first woman to fly a commercial airliner in Afghanistan.

== Early life and education ==
Mirzaee attended the Afghan Turk Maarif School in Kabul. She was a high achiever in mathematics and science, and described admiring "the complexity of machines" during her youth. As a child, she told her mother that she did not want to work a desk job; her mother suggested she should become a pilot. Her interest in flying subsequently developed at a young age, and she became serious about wishing to enter the profession at the age of fifteen.

To reward her academic performance, Mirzaee's mother arrange for her to speak with pilots at air bases for her sixteenth birthday. The pilots she spoke with at first suggested she could become an air traffic controller. When she expressed a desire to fly, they took her that she was not fit for the profession, claiming she was not physically strong enough.

=== Flight training ===
In 2015, Mirzaee travelled to Port Colborne, Canada to complete her secondary education as part of an exchange program, where she signed up for flying lessons to learn the fundamentals. She undertook her early training at Billy Bishop Airport in Toronto, paying $300 per lesson. Mirzaee paid for the lessons by working minimum-wage jobs at McDonald's and Walmart, and as a receptionist at a dental clinic.

Although she was accepted to a Canadian university to study engineering, she believed her life would be "meaningless" if she abandoned her aspirations of flying. She subsequently returned to Afghanistan and frequently contacted Kam Air until they allowed her to enter their training program. She spent the next 18 months training at Airworks Aviation Academy in the Philippines.

== Career in Afghanistan ==
Mirzaee's first commercial flight took place 20 August 2020. For almost a year, she conducted domestic flights as the pilot of a Boeing 737, and also few to destinations including Saudi Arabia and Turkey. She conducted training in Bulgaria twice a year, in accordance with company practice.

=== First all-female commercial flight in Afghanistan ===
On 24 February 2021, a crew of two pilots and four cabin crew, with Mirzaee as captain, undertook Afghanistan's first all-female commercial flight. Her copilot was Ukrainian Veronika Borisova.

Lasting 90 minutes, the plane travelled 350 nautical miles from Kabul to Herat. The crew did not announce the significance of the flight to its passengers, fearing a poor reception from more "conservative" travellers on board. Aviation vlogger Josh Cahill was invited to document the flight, and the video he later posted about the event made international headlines.

=== Fall of Kabul ===
In August 2021, the United States Armed Forces completed their withdrawal from Afghanistan, and Kabul fell to the Taliban.

On 15 August, Mirzaee was preparing for a flight to Istanbul from Kabul airport that was cancelled due to unrest in the city. She instead fled to Kyiv, Ukraine as a passenger, only to be refused entry to the country. As she still had a valid visa for Bulgaria, she travelled there instead on 16 August. She was separated from her mother and two sisters, who were evacuated to Albania. Mirzaee's family members were eventually resettled in Canada.

Mirzaee has expressed a hope that "one day [she] will go back home and fly again." However, she believes she will only be able to return if the Taliban "will respect women's rights" and let them "work as [they] did in the past."

== Career in Europe ==
Mirzaee's visa expired in November 2021, prompting her to claim asylum. While she waited for a decision on her status, she undertook exams to convert her qualifications to European standards. She was motivated by a belief that the Taliban "want to silence women," and giving up on her career would mean "they... achieved their goal."

By the end of 2022, she had attained status in Bulgaria, a European pilot's license, and a position at an airline. In an interview with Aero Telegraph the following year, Mirzaee described her reaction to airport security officials remarking on her nationality whenever her passport is checked: "Yes, I am from Afghanistan, and I say it proudly."

As of 2025, Mirzaee works as a cargo pilot for the same company as Veronika Borisova, whom she flew with on Afghanistan's all-female flight. Commenting on the restrictions to women's participation in civic life in Afghanistan, Mirzaee stated: "Right now, we’re not using half of our population, so obviously, our country is not going to reach anywhere."

== Recognition ==
Mirzaee was included in the BBC's 100 Women 2021, a list of "inspiring and influential women from around the world" compiled annually. She provided a quote aimed at readers: "Don’t wait! No-one will come and give you your wings if you don’t stand strong. I fought for mine; you will fight for yours".
