= Kunduz Airport =

Kunduz Airport Pashto: د کندز هوايي ډګر
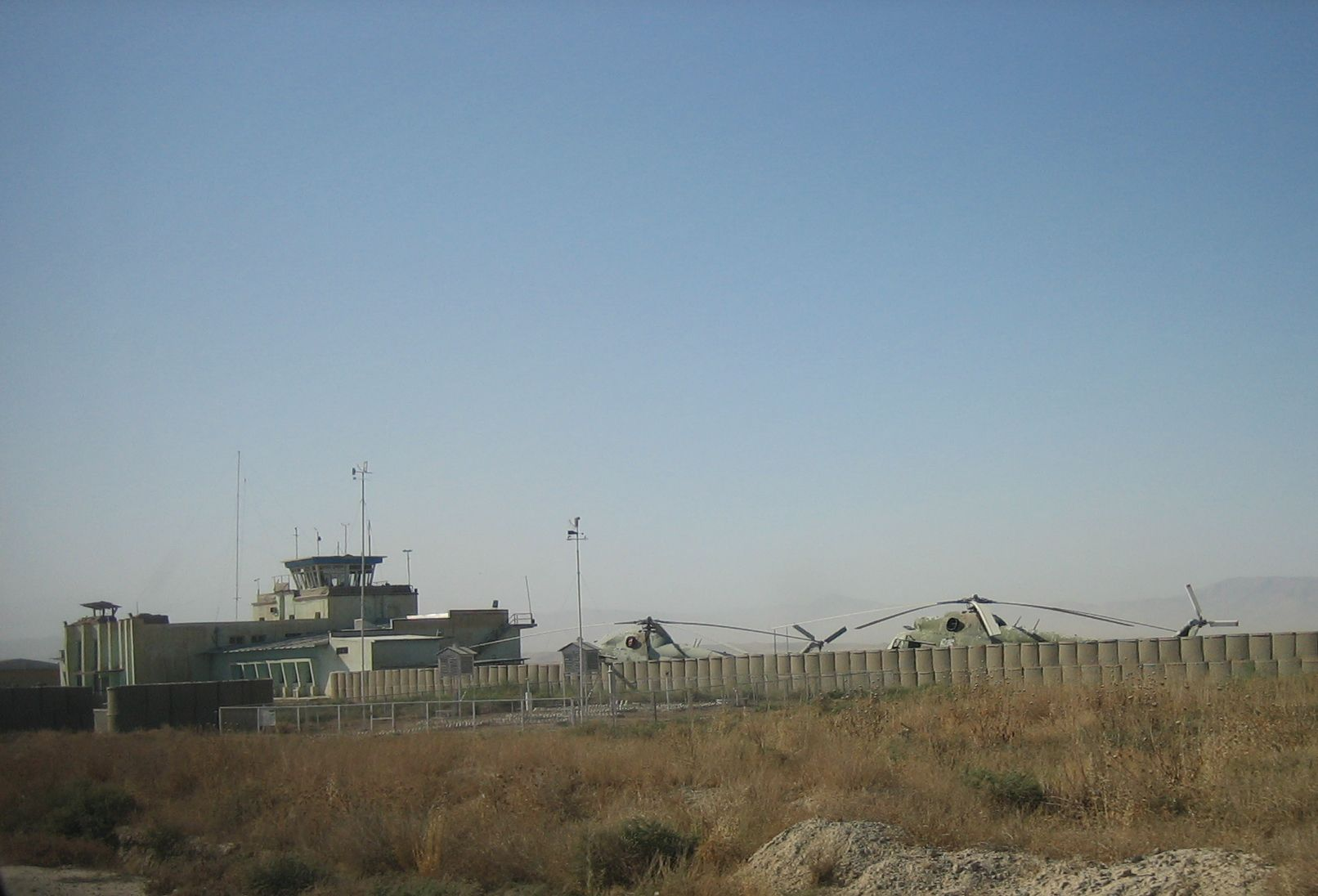
- Kunduz Airport (2009)
- IATA: UND; ICAO: OAUZ

Summary
- Airport type: Public
- Owner: Afghanistan
- Operator: Ministry of Transport and Civil Aviation
- Serves: Kunduz Province
- Location: Kunduz, Afghanistan
- Built: 1958
- Elevation AMSL: 1,457 ft (444 m)
- Coordinates: 36°39′54″N 68°54′39″E

Map
- Location of airport in Afghanistan

Runways
| Direction | Length | | Surface |
| Direction | ft | m | Surface |
|---|---|---|---|
| 11/29 | 8,100 | 2,469 | Asphalt |
- Sources: Great Circle Mapper,

Kunduz Airport (IATA: UND, ICAO: OAUZ) is located about 5 miles (8.0 km) southeast of Kunduz (also spelled Konduz), the capital of Kunduz Province in Afghanistan. It is a domestic airport under the country's Ministry of Transport and Civil Aviation (MoTCA), and serves the population of Kunduz Province. Security in and around the airport is provided by the Afghan National Security Forces.

The airport resides at an elevation of 1,457 feet (444 m) above mean sea level. It has one runway designated 11/29 with an asphalt surface measuring 8,100 by 148 feet (2,469 m × 45 m). A new terminal was added in 2017, which has a capacity of housing up to 1,300 passengers. The entire airport was expanded and updated in recent years but some work remains to be completed.

== History ==
The airport was originally built in 1958 when Afghanistan was ruled by King Zahir Shah. "Two years later, the airport was further constructed by the United States." During the 1980s, it was used by Afghan and Soviet forces for military purposes. It was recently used by forces of NATO's Resolute Support Mission.

After the withdrawal of all NATO forces from Afghanistan, members of the Taliban took control of Kunduz Airport in August 2021. They captured weaponry and vehicles from the Afghan National Army and Afghan Air Force, including an Mi-35 Hind attack helicopter given to the Afghan Air Force by India.

== Airlines and destinations ==
Each week there are two flights between Kunduz Airport and Kabul International Airport. Kam Air formerly operates services to Kabul International Airport. All flights from Kunduz Airport were suspended between August 2021 and July 2022.

=== Former airlines and destinations ===
| Airlines | Destinations |
|---|---|
| Ariana Afghan Airlines | Kabul, Mazar-i-Sharif |
| Bakhtar Afghan Airlines | Kunduz |
| East Horizon Airlines | Kabul, Fayzabad |
| Kam Air | Kabul |

== Incidents ==
- On 17 May 2010, confirmed reports state that Pamir Airways Flight 112, an Antonov An-24, crashed 100 km away from Kabul International Airport. The plane was en route from Kunduz Airport to Kabul, when it suddenly disappeared from radars. The wreckage was located on 20 May, rescuers reached the site on 21 May. No signs of life were found.
- On 28 September 2015, during the Battle of Kunduz, many civilians from the city of Kunduz fled to the airport, which was not taken by the Taliban. According to a government security official, the Taliban had been vastly outnumbered, with only an estimated 500 fighters remaining against about 7,000 government troops and allied militia members. However, local politicians from Kunduz said that the government had failed to provide leadership and support to its fighters in the area.
- On 11 August 2021, the news channel Russia Today, reported that the airport was captured by the Taliban. The airport's government forces had outlasted other centres in Kunduz before its capture.

== See also ==
- List of airports in Afghanistan
