= Sherkhan Farnood =

Afghan banker (1963–2018)

Sherkhan Farnood (15 August 1963 – 24 August 2018) was an Afghan banker, Chairman of Kabul Bank until late 2010, which is Afghanistan's largest private financial institution with over 1 million customers. Farnood held 28.16% of the shares in the Kabul Bank. He also owned Pamir Airways, in partnership with Khalilullah Fruzi/Frozi, Mohammed Fahim and possibly others. According to media reports, by November 2010 Da Afghanistan Bank insisted both Farnood and Kabul Bank chief executive Frozi had been removed from bank management;. As of early 2011, both were effectively under house arrest and could not leave the country.

An ethnic Uzbek, Farnood was originally from Kunduz Province of northern Afghanistan. He studied chemical engineering while simultaneously running a business in Moscow, Russia. During the 1980s and 1990s, he ran a hawala, or an informal money transfer organization in Moscow.

Farnood became a prominent poker player, he took part in the 2008 World Series of Poker Europe (WSOPE) and won his first bracelet. Prior to his detention, he spent most of his time in Dubai, United Arab Emirates, where he owned a number of villas on Palm Jumeirah.

On 24 August 2018, Farnood died in prison at the age of 55, apparently due to natural causes .
