= Khwaja Abdullah Ansari International Airport =

Airport in Herat, Afghanistan

Khwaja Abdullah Ansari International Airport Dari: میدان هوایی بین المللی هرات
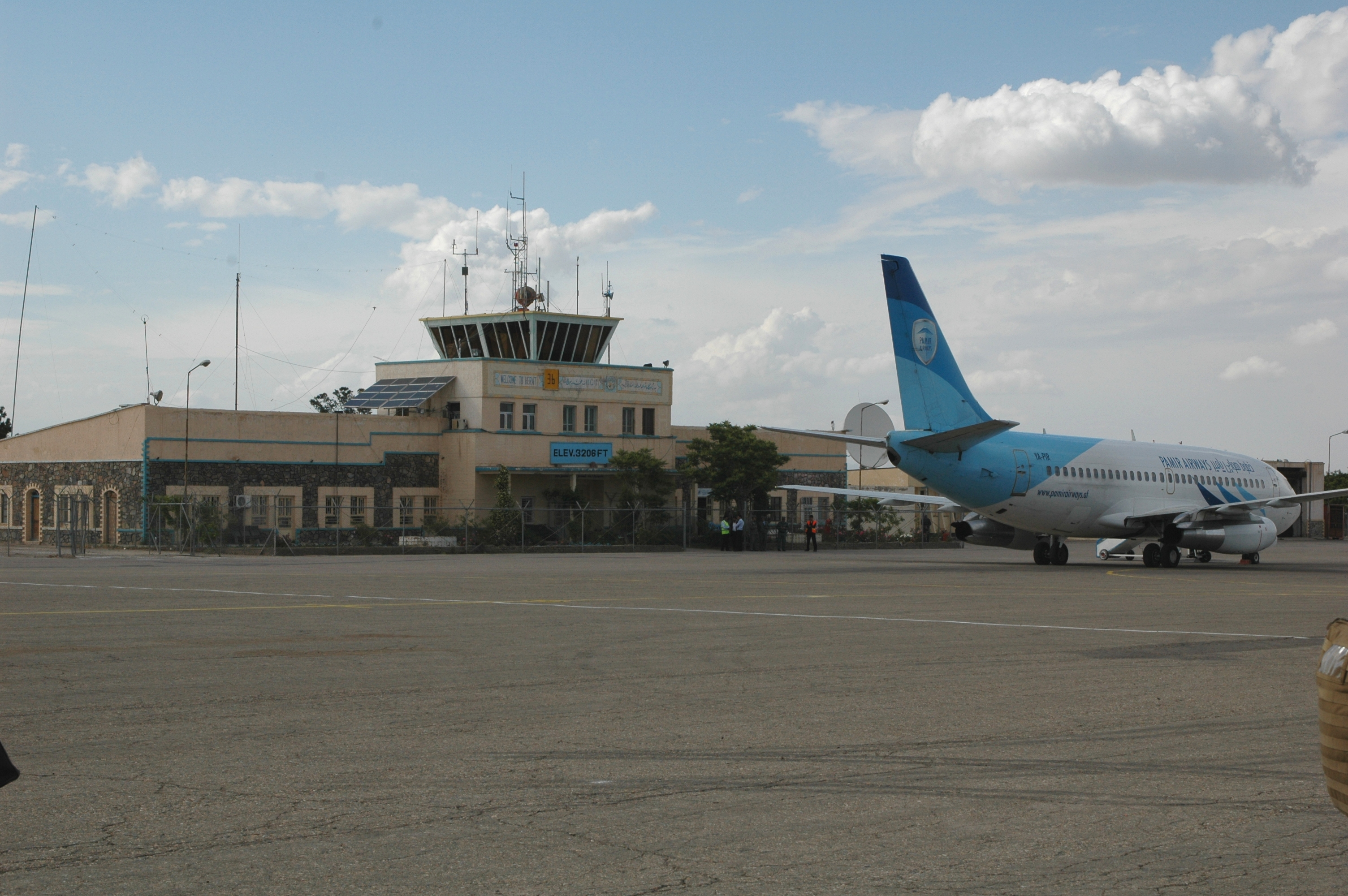
- A Pamir Airways Boeing 737 jet parked at the airport in 2010
- IATA: HEA; ICAO: OAHR

Summary
- Airport type: Public/Military
- Owner: Government of Afghanistan
- Operator: GAAC Holding
- Serves: Herat Province
- Location: Herat
- Built: 1960s
- Elevation AMSL: 3,290 ft (1,000 m)
- Coordinates: 34°12′36″N 62°13′42″E

Map
- Location of airport in Afghanistan

Runways
Direction	Length		Surface
Direction	ft	m	Surface
18/36	9 888	3 014	Paved
- Source: Landings.com, AIP Afghanistan

The Khwaja Abdullah Ansari International Airport, also known as Herat International Airport (IATA: HEA, ICAO: OAHR) is located about 10 km (6.2 mi) southeast of the city of Herat in western Afghanistan, next to the Kandahar–Herat Highway Highway in the Guzara District of the Herat Province. Named after Khwaja Abdullah Ansari, it is Afghanistan's fourth largest commercial airport after the Kabul International Airport in Kabul, the Ahmad Shah Baba International Airport in Kandahar, and the Mawlana Jalaluddin Mohammad Balkhi International Airport in Mazar-i-Sharif.

== History ==
The airport was originally built in the 1960s by engineers from the United States. It was used by the Soviet forces during the 1980s. The airport was a base for fighters and transport aircraft (likely Antonov An-26, Antonov An-32 and Mikoyan-Gurevich MiG-21). After capturing the city, the Taliban took control of the airport in 1995. The airport was jet bombed by the anti-Taliban alliance on 4 November 1996. On 12 November 2001, an uprising broke out, and the Taliban were ousted from the area. Elements of the U.S. Army Special Forces Operational Detachment Alpha 554 ("Texas 08") arrived at the airport soon afterwards, and in the words of the team's report: "...directly negotiate[d] with local commanders for the placement of multinational humanitarian assistance teams to be stationed" at the airport. From 2002 to 2005, the U.S.-led coalition forces ran international operations at the airport.

In May 2005, responsibility was shifted to the International Security Assistance Force (ISAF), as part of the Stage 2 transition between the U.S.-led coalition and NATO. For 45 days a 47-person Tanker Airlift Control Element, primarily deployed from the 621st Contingency Response Wing, McGuire Air Force Base, N.J., prepared the airport for the arrival of 300+ Italian troops as they assumed leadership over ISAF operations in the western regions of Afghanistan. For this particular tasking, they supported two C-17 sorties every day. They also assisted the Italian aerial port in servicing coalition C-130s that landed at the airport.

The departure hall of Herat International Airport, Afghanistan in 2025

ISAF use has continued since 2005, joined by the Afghan Air Force and the Afghan National Police. In recent years Italy has pledged 137 million Euros for the expansion of the airport. As a result, the runway was extended and re-paved and a new international terminal, named after Captain Massimo Ranzani, a fallen Italian officer, was opened. In January 2021, Afghan President Ashraf Ghani renamed the airport after Khwaja Abdullah Ansari.

In August 2021, the Taliban seized control of the airport and other parts of Herat.

== Airlines and destinations ==
Airlines	Destinations
Ariana Afghan Airlines	Kabul; Seasonal: Jeddah
Kam Air	Kabul, Dubai

== See also ==
- List of airlines of Afghanistan
- List of airports in Afghanistan
