= Kabul International Airport =

International airport near Kabul, Afghanistan

Kabul International Airport Pashto: د کابل نړیوال هوايي ډګر
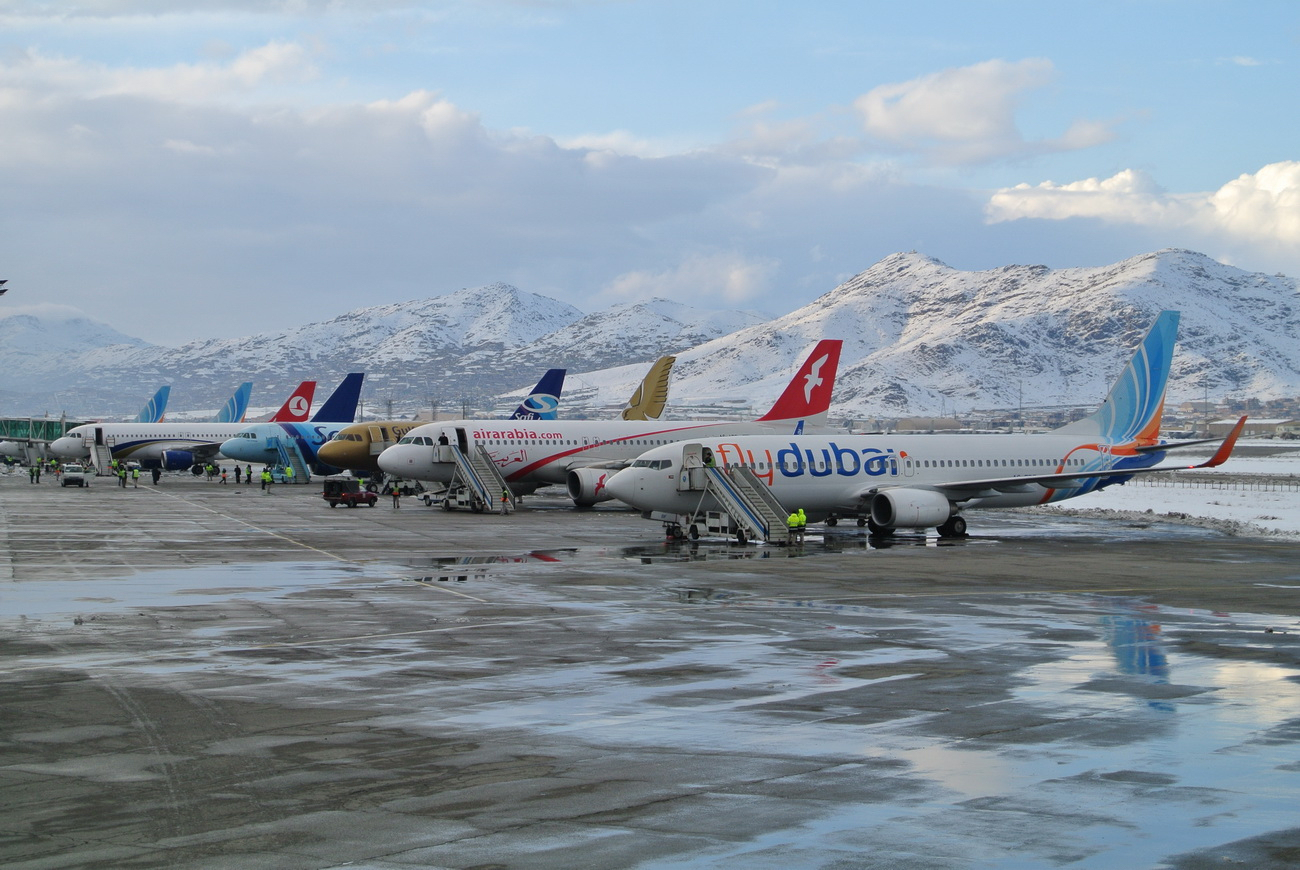
- The airport's flightline in January 2012
- IATA: KBL; ICAO: OAKB

Summary
- Airport type: Public
- Owner: Ministry of Transport and Civil Aviation
- Operator: GAAC Holding
- Serves: Kabul
- Location: Kabul, Afghanistan
- Hub for: Ariana Airlines; Kam Air
- Built: 1960 (66 years ago)
- Elevation AMSL: 5,877 ft (1,791 m)
- Coordinates: 34°33′57″N 069°12′47″E
- Website: kia.gov.af

Maps
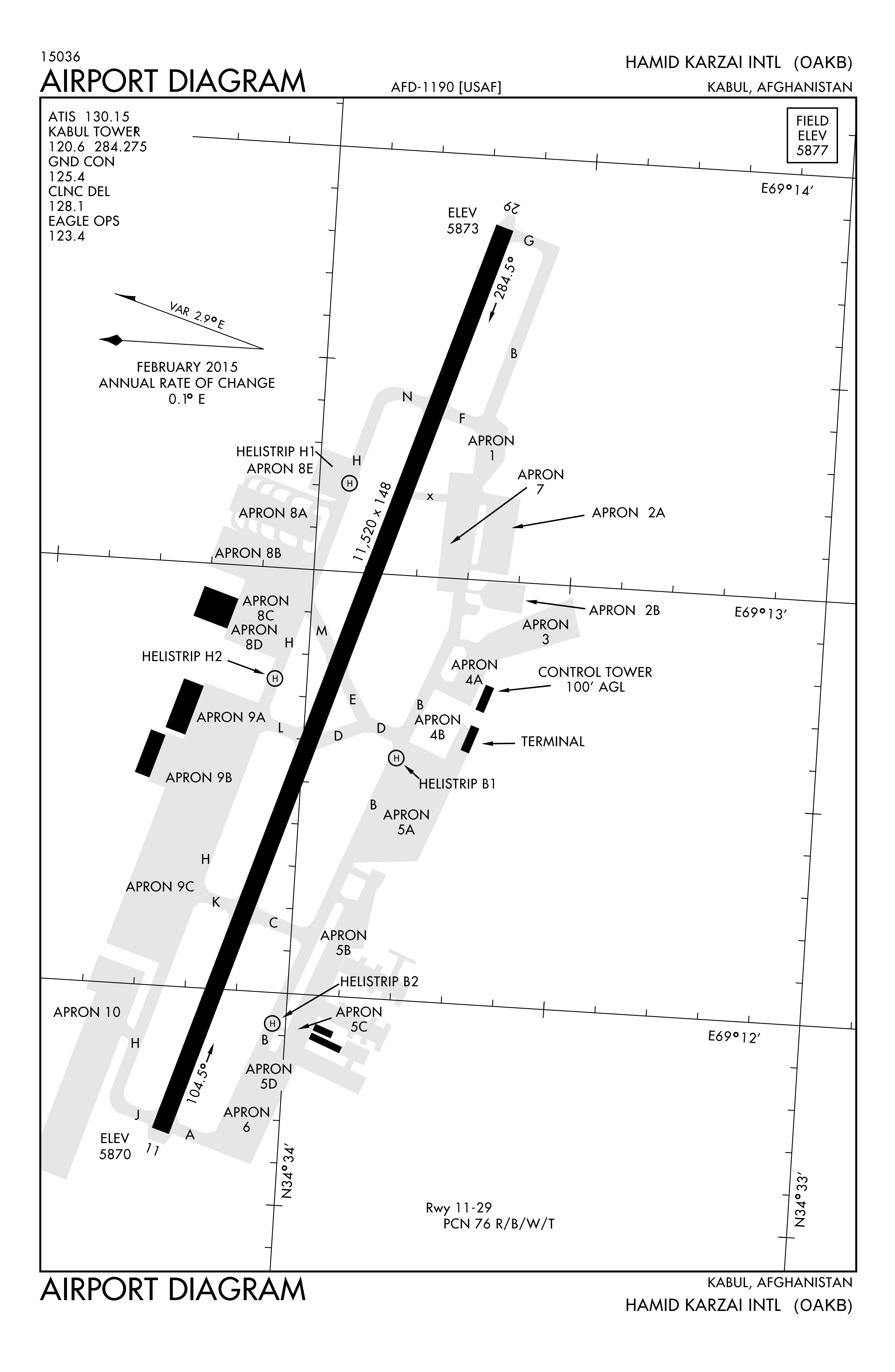
- A 2015 United States Air Force diagram of the airport

- Location of the airport in Afghanistan KBL/OAKB (South Asia) KBL/OAKB (West and Central Asia) KBL/OAKB (Asia)

Runways
Direction	Length		Surface
Direction	m	ft	Surface
11/29	3,511	11,519	Paved
- Source: AIP Afghanistan

Kabul International Airport (IATA: KBL, ICAO: OAKB), formerly known as Hamid Karzai International Airport, is an international airport located in Kabul, Afghanistan. It is one of the country's main international airports, capable of housing over a hundred military and civilian aircraft. It is currently operated by UAE-based GAAC Holding and Afghanistan's Ministry of Transport and Civil Aviation.

The airport was originally named Khwaja Rawash Airport because it was built in the area named Khwaja Rawash. It was given the name Kabul Airport in 1960 after the Soviet Union built a terminal and a concrete runway. From 2014 to 2021, it was named Hamid Karzai International Airport in honor of former president Hamid Karzai. After the Taliban returned to power in 2021, the name was changed back to Kabul International Airport.

Sitting at an altitude of approximately 1,791 m (5,876 ft) above sea level, the airport is surrounded by parts of the Hindu Kush mountains. It serves as a hub for Ariana Airlines and Kam Air. International companies such as Air Arabia, Flydubai and Turkish Airlines also provide passenger services.

The airport has two separate terminals, one for international passengers and the other for domestic flights. It also has a number of empty military bases, which were previously used by the United States Armed Forces and NATO's International Security Assistance Force (ISAF) and later the Resolute Support Mission (RS). The Afghan Air Force also had a base at the airport, with the Afghan National Security Forces providing security inside the passenger terminals.

Prior to the withdrawal of US-led forces in 2021, the airport provided scheduled flights to and from China, India, Iran, Pakistan, Russia, Tajikistan, Turkey, Uzbekistan, and the Persian Gulf region. The most frequently serviced destination from the airport has been Dubai in the UAE, with no fewer than four passenger airlines flying the route, and some with multiple daily flights.

== History ==
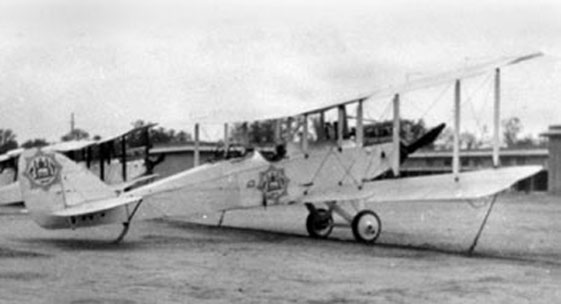
An Avro 504 was one of the first aircraft to be used by the Afghan Air Force.

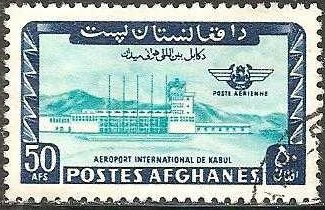
A 1968 Afghan postage stamp depicting the airport

Kabul Airport was established during the Kingdom of Amanullah Khan in the 1920s, which housed aircraft of the Afghan Air Force and Afghan Post. Its original location was a short distance to the south of the current location, in and around Chaman-e-Hozori. The first international flight occurred in 1927 between Kabul and Tashkent, Soviet Union. It was modernized in 1960 by Soviet engineers. The airport was called Khwaja Rawash Airport because it was built in the area called Khwaja Rawash. Foreign tourists began visiting Afghanistan via Kabul Airport. This era ended after the 1978 Saur Revolution, especially after the 1979 Soviet invasion.

Following the U.S. invasion of Afghanistan after the September 11 attacks, Kabul Airport was bombed by United States and coalition forces. After the ISAF took over control, the airport began to be developed slowly over the years. A new radar system was installed in 2005, which was upgraded by the U.S. Federal Aviation Administration in 2010.

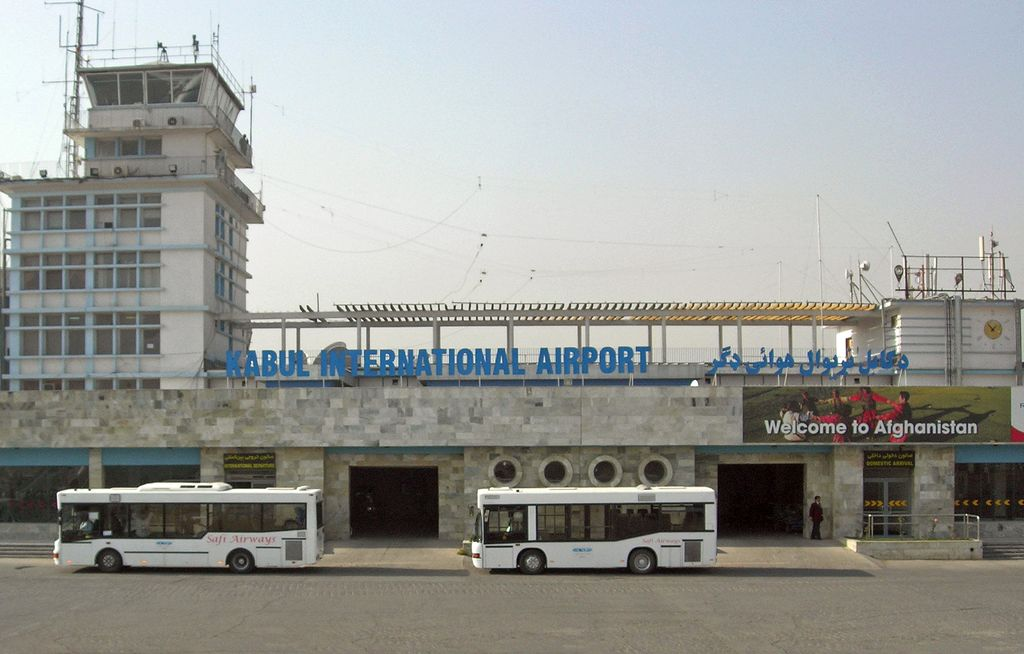
The Soviet-built domestic terminal in 2008

A new $35 million terminal for international flights was inaugurated in November 2008, built with aid from the Japan International Cooperation Agency. This terminal has two jetbridges. The then-Afghan President Hamid Karzai attended the inauguration ceremony. The new terminal was officially opened to international flights in June 2009. The existing terminal has been refurbished and used for domestic flights.

In October 2014, the National Assembly of Afghanistan proposed naming the airport after former Afghan President Hamid Karzai, a month after his tenure ended, in recognition of his services and contributions to the country's rebuilding. This decision was approved by the Cabinet of the new President Ashraf Ghani, which renamed the structure as Hamid Karzai International Airport.

=== 2021 NATO withdrawal from Afghanistan ===
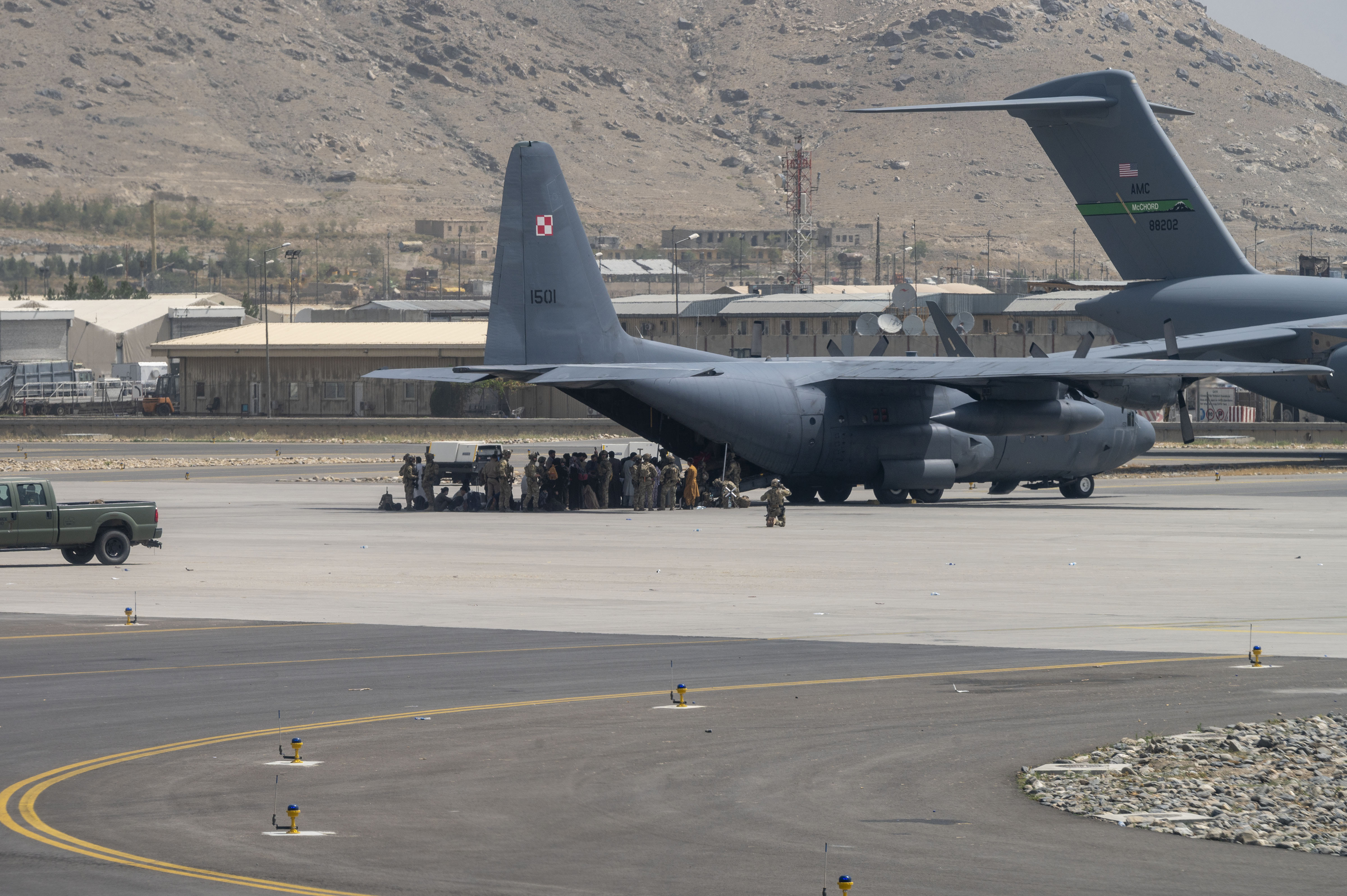
Afghan evacuees boarding a Polish C-130 Hercules during Operation Allies Refuge on 17 August 2021

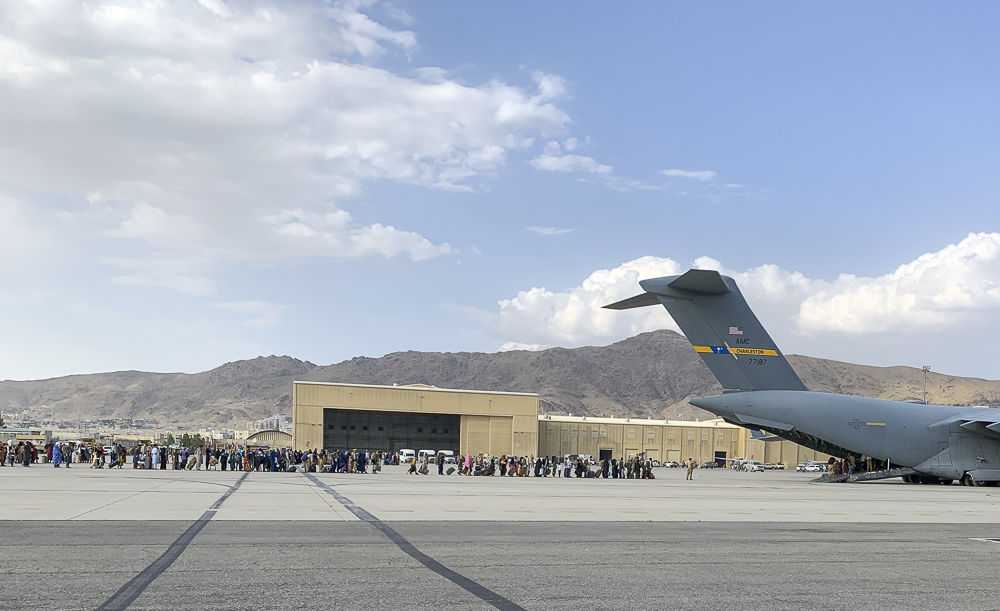
Afghan evacuees boarding American aircraft during Operation Allies Refuge on 21 August 2021

In July 2021, the Taliban took over many areas in Afghanistan, including those near Kabul Airport. Turkey announced that it would provide security at the airport. U.S. and NATO forces were still deployed at the airport as well. A few weeks later, Kabul fell into the hands of the Taliban, prompting thousands of people to flee to the airport in an attempt to leave the country. Seven people were alleged to have died at the airport after the crowds consisting of thousands of people tried to forcibly enter planes leaving the airport. US forces fired in the air to prevent the crowds running onto the tarmac and runways. On 16 August 2021, the US Deputy Security Advisor announced the deployment of more forces to secure the airport. The Pentagon confirmed the head of U.S. Central Command, General Kenneth F. McKenzie Jr., met Taliban leaders in Qatar. The Taliban officials agreed to terms set by McKenzie for refugees to flee using the Kabul International Airport.

Following the fall of Kabul, the Afghan National Army and the Afghan National Police abandoned their posts. U.S. and allied forces subsequently took over the posts. On 16 August 2021, all commercial flights from Kabul Airport were canceled indefinitely.

On 26 August 2021, more than 100 people were killed in an explosion outside Kabul Airport. The Islamic State of Iraq and the Levant - Khorasan (ISIS-K) claimed responsibility. The last American forces departed from the airport around midnight on 30 August, ending U.S. involvement in the 20-year war. The Taliban subsequently took control of the airport. Rough estimates by the Taliban calculated the damage to the airport at around $350 million. Abdul Hadi Hamadan, the Taliban head of the airport, later stated that the damage to the airport's terminal alone due to the evacuation was $1 million.

Several novels have been published following the dramatic US evacuation from the country. Those titles include: "Life and Death at Abbey Gate", "Saving Aziz", "Always Faithful", and "Kabul".

=== Operation under Taliban rule ===
Following the Taliban takeover, the airport was closed. Much of its infrastructure had been degraded or destroyed during the evacuation. According to Qatari Minister of Foreign Affairs Mohammed bin Abdulrahman bin Jassim Al Thani, Qatar was to send technical assistance to Afghanistan to help reopen the airport as soon as possible. Mevlüt Çavuşoğlu, the Minister of Foreign Affairs of Turkey, stated that the Taliban and other countries had requested Turkey for help in resuming operations at the airport. The Minister of Foreign Affairs of the Netherlands, Sigrid Kaag, stated that her government was willing to support Turkey and Qatar in reopening the airport. Meanwhile, the security of the airport was handed over to the Al-Fatah Brigade of the special forces of the group on 3 September.

The airport reopened for Ariana Afghan Airlines' domestic flights between Kabul and the cities of Herat, Mazar-i-Sharif and Kandahar, as well as for receiving aid from other countries, on 4 September, following work carried out by a technical team from Qatar, which repaired the airport's runway. Taliban spokesman Zabiullah Mujahid stated on 6 September that Turkey and Qatar were trying to restart all flights from the airport. On 8 September 2021, a NOTAM was issued by the airport's NOTAM office, indicating that the airport is operating between 03:30 and 13:30 Coordinated Universal Time. Additional NOTAMs issued that day indicate that the airports instrument landing system is operative and that the airport's tower is operating again.

A Qatar Airways flight evacuating 113 nationals of other countries from Afghanistan was allowed to land at and depart from the airport on 9 September due to cooperation between the United States and the Taliban, marking the first such flight since the Taliban had completely taken over the facility. Meanwhile, the Taliban renamed the airport to Kabul International Airport, eliminating the reference to former Afghan President Hamid Karzai.

A Pakistan International Airlines flight landed at the airport on 13 September, marking the first international commercial flight to land since the Taliban takeover. Mahan Air resumed flights to the airport on 15 September, marking resumption of commercial flights between Iran and Afghanistan. The Ministry of Foreign Affairs on 26 September announced that the problems at the airport had been resolved and asked international airlines to resume their flights, promising full cooperation.

== Facilities ==
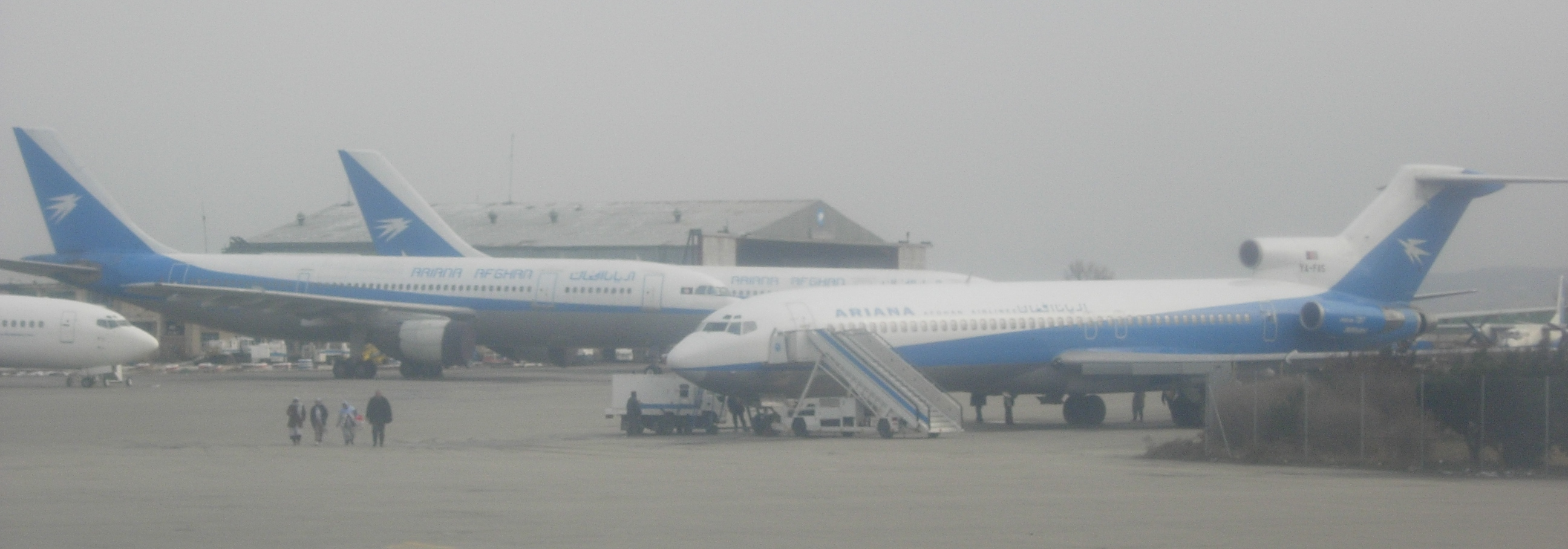
Various Ariana Afghan Airlines aircraft at the airport in 2007

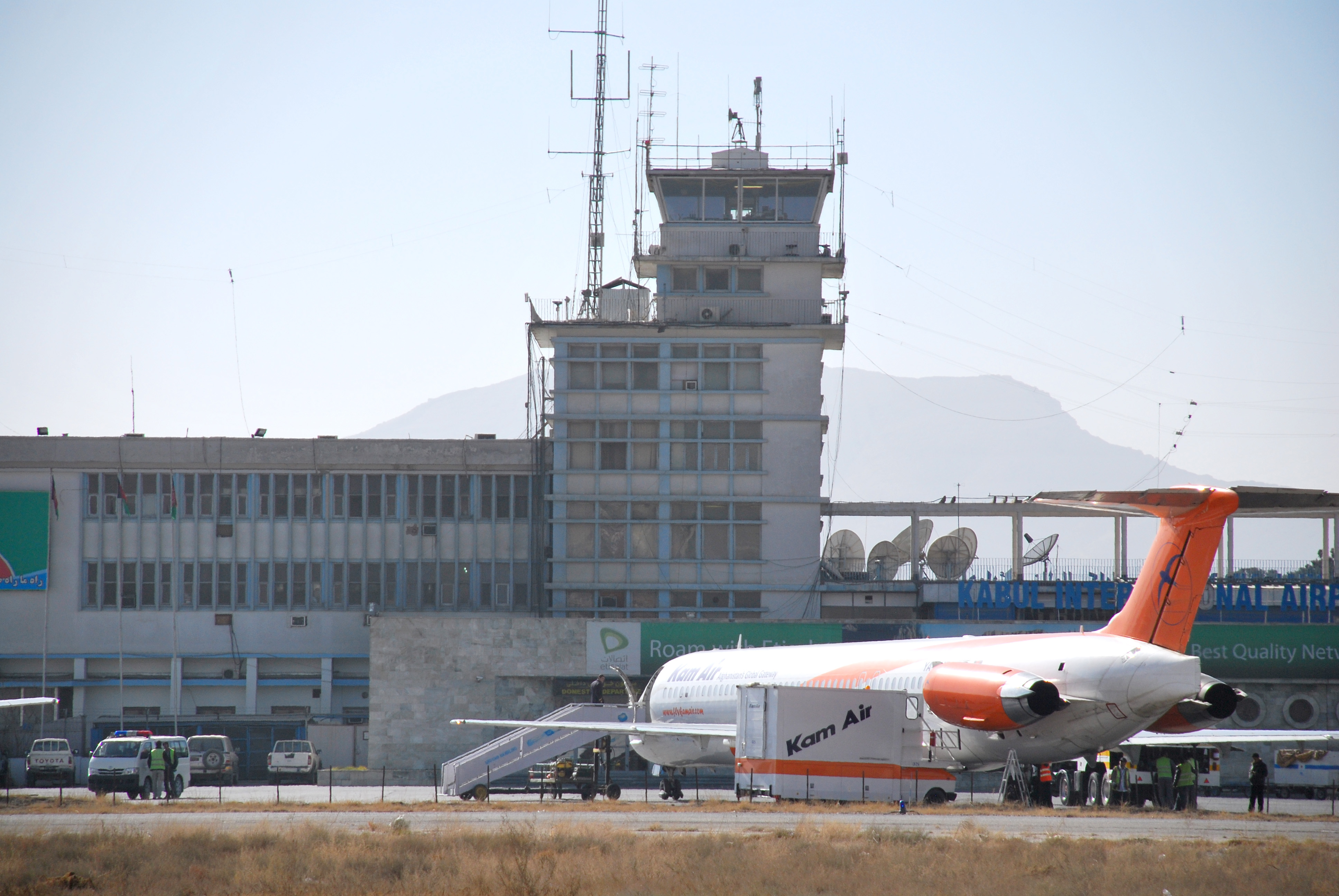
The airport's control tower and a Kam Air aircraft in 2010

The departure hall of the Kabul International Airport Domestic Terminal in 2025

The airport has two terminals: the original that opened in 1960 and a newer building that opened in 2008. The terminal that opened in 2008 is used for international flights; the original 1960 Soviet-constructed terminal is used for domestic flights. Several hangars along the runway are for military aircraft. There are no hangars for civilian (or transient) aircraft. The airport has seven helicopter pads which are used mostly for military traffic. Fire fighting equipment is present. The firefighting equipment has a present capacity of up to 12,000 litres (2,600 imp gal; 3,200 US gal) of water and has the ability to reach 90 metres (300 ft) in height to manage fire outbreaks.

== Airlines and destinations ==
Airlines	Destinations
Air Arabia	Sharjah
Ariana Afghan Airlines	Delhi, Dubai–International, Herat, Islamabad, Jeddah, Kandahar, Mazar-i-Sharif, Moscow–Sheremetyevo, Ürümqi
Etihad Airways	Abu Dhabi
flydubai	Dubai–International
Iran Air	Mashhad
Iran Airtour	Mashhad, Tehran–Imam Khomeini
Kam Air	Doha, Dubai–International, Herat, Islamabad, Istanbul, Istanbul–Sabiha Gökçen, Jeddah, Khost, Kuwait City, Riyadh, Sharjah, Tashkent
Mahan Air	Tehran–Imam Khomeini
Meraj Airlines	Tehran–Imam Khomeini
Turkish Airlines	Istanbul
Varesh Airlines	Tehran–Imam Khomeini

== Transportation ==
Buses, taxi and private cars provide transportation to and from the airport. A four-lane highway connects the airport to Kabul.

== Accidents and incidents ==
=== Civilian ===
- On 2 January 1962, Iran Air Flight 123, a Douglas DC-3 on a cargo flight, crashed while attempting to take-off from Kabul. During the take-off roll the captain noticed a malfunction in the number 1 engine followed by the aircraft veering to the left of the runway. To avoid a crash, the captain pulled the aircraft up into the air, but while attempting to turn the aircraft away from the airport, a wing struck the ground followed by a crash. Both crew members survived.
- On 15 January 1969, Douglas DC-3 YA-AAB of Ariana Afghan Airlines was damaged beyond economic repair in a ground collision with Douglas DC-6 YA-DAN, also of Ariana.
- On 21 September 1984, a McDonnell Douglas DC-10-30 of Ariana Afghan Airlines was hit by explosive bullets while on approach to Kabul Airport. All passengers and crew survived the incident.
- On 12 June 1990, an Ilyushin Il-76 of Aeroflot was struck by a missile while flying at 6,900 m (22,500 ft) causing two engines to shut down. The aircraft made a forced landing in Kabul with no flaps on an unpaved runway. All 10 crew survived.
- On 29 May 1992, an Ariana Afghan Airlines Tupolev Tu-154 was struck by a missile while landing at Kabul. The nose of the aircraft was damaged but it landed safely. All passengers and crew survived.
- On 19 March 1998, a Boeing 727-200 of Ariana Afghan Airlines crashed into the 910 m (3,000 ft) Sharki Baratayi mountain while descending into Kabul. All 10 crew and 35 passengers on board died.
- On 3 February 2005, Kam Air Flight 904, a Boeing 737-200 operated by Phoenix Aviation, vanished from radar screens on approach to Kabul in poor weather, sparking a massive Afghan National Army search operation for the 96 passengers and eight crew. The wreckage of the aircraft was found two days later in the mountains east of Kabul, all 105 people on board were killed.
- On 17 May 2010, all contact with Pamir Airways Flight 112, an Antonov An-24 operated by Pamir Airways, was lost ten minutes after departure from Kunduz Airport. After search efforts lasting four days, wreckage from the flight was located 19 kilometres (12 mi) from Kabul. All 39 passengers and five crew on board the flight died.
- On 12 October 2010, Transafrik International Flight 662, a Lockheed L-100 Hercules crashed into a mountain on approach to the airport. All 8 crew members were killed.
- On 8 May 2014, Ariana Afghan Airlines Flight 312, a Boeing 737-400, ran off the runway after landing at the airport. Flight 312 originated in Delhi, India and operated on a scheduled passenger service to Kabul. On landing the aircraft overshot runway 29, coming to rest on uneven terrain. The aircraft was heavily damaged and six passengers were slightly injured.

=== Military ===
- On 11 March 1985, an Antonov An-30 of the Soviet Air Force was on an aerial photography flight in the Kabul area south of the Panjshir Valley. Upon returning to the airport, the aircraft was struck by a Strela missile. The captain tried to make an emergency landing at Bagram Airbase but was too high. A fire ignited by the missile strike then reached the aileron controls causing the pilots to lose control; three of the five crew members evacuated the aircraft safely, but the other two crew members died.
- On 29 November 1986, a Soviet Air Force Antonov An-26 was hit by a Stinger missile while climbing out of Kabul. The aircraft was carrying several tons of S-24 rockets and 400 kg of explosives to Jalalabad in Afghanistan. All seven crew members perished.
- On 21 October 1987, a Soviet Air Force Antonov An-12BK collided with a Mil Mi-24 helicopter while taking off in poor visibility. The aircraft was heading for the capital city of then Uzbek Soviet Socialist Republic, Tashkent; 18 of the 19 passengers and crew died.
- On 21 December 1987, a Soviet Air Force Antonov An-26 was hit by a Stinger missile while circling to a safe altitude shortly after take-off. The number one engine was hit, puncturing the fuel tank. Smoke entered the cabin. All six crew members parachuted out; the captain jumped too close to the ground to open his parachute and died upon impact.
- On 24 June 1988, a Soviet Air Force Antonov An-26 was hit by bullets fired from Mujahideen rebels. The aircraft crashed in Kabul, killing one of the six crew members on board.
- On 28 August 1992, a Soviet Air Force Ilyushin Il-76MD was hit by a renegade Mujahideen rocket while boarding Russian embassy staff.
- On 5 August 2008, a Lockheed C-130H Hercules of the United Arab Emirates Air Force overran the runway upon landing in Kabul, causing a fire in the forward section of the aircraft. The aircraft was carrying aid to Afghanistan. All crew members survived.
- On 16 August 2021, as a Boeing C-17 Globemaster III of the United States Air Force was taking off, crowds of people trying to escape the 2021 Taliban offensive were seen running alongside and clinging onto the aircraft. The aircraft lifted up into the air with people still holding on, with at least two dying after falling from the aircraft and an unknown number possibly crushed and killed by the landing gear retracting; human remains were found in the wheel well. The incident was widely reported in U.S. and international media.

=== Non-aircraft related ===
- On 31 August 1984, Afghan guerillas exploded a bomb at the airport where several Aeroflot planes were picking up passengers, killing 28 people and wounding 350 others.
- On 8 September 2009, at around 8:22 AM local time, a suicide bombing took place near the entrance of the airport's military base.
- On 3 July 2014, Taliban fighters fired two rockets into the airport, destroying four helicopters. One of the four helicopters belonged to Afghan President Hamid Karzai.
- On 29 January 2015, three American defense contractors and one Afghan national were killed by a gunman outside the airport in late evening local time.
- On 17 May 2015, a suicide bombing by the Taliban near the entrance of the airport occurred, killing three and injuring eighteen.
- On 26 August 2021, more than 185 people were killed, including at least 13 U.S. service members and 90 Afghans, at the Kabul airport when two ISIS-K suicide bombers ripped through crowds trying to enter the American-controlled facility, disrupting the final push of the U.S.-led evacuation effort. The bombs were set off near a crowd of families at the airport gates who were desperately hoping to make one of the last evacuation flights out. Gunfire was reported in the aftermath of the explosions.
- On 29 August 2021, smoke was seen rising from two explosions which occurred near the airport, one of which killed a child. Explosions occurred hours after U.S. President Joe Biden warned of another terrorist attack in Kabul.
- On 30 August 2021, US troops used thermite bombs to disable several counter rocket, artillery and mortar systems used to protect the airfield from incoming ISIS-K fired rockets.

== See also ==
- List of airports in Afghanistan
