= List of airlines of Afghanistan =

This is a list of airlines which have a current Air Operator Certificate issued by the Afghanistan Ministry of Transport and Civil Aviation. Since 2010, all airlines are banned from flying into the EU.

== Scheduled airlines ==
Airline	Image	Callsign	Fleet	Commenced operations
Ariana Afghan Airlines		ARIANA	6	1955
Kam Air		KAMGAR	11	2003

== See also ==
- List of airlines
- List of air carriers banned in the European Union
- List of defunct airlines of Afghanistan
- List of airports in Afghanistan
- List of defunct airlines of Asia
