= Josh Cahill =

Aviation vlogger and blogger

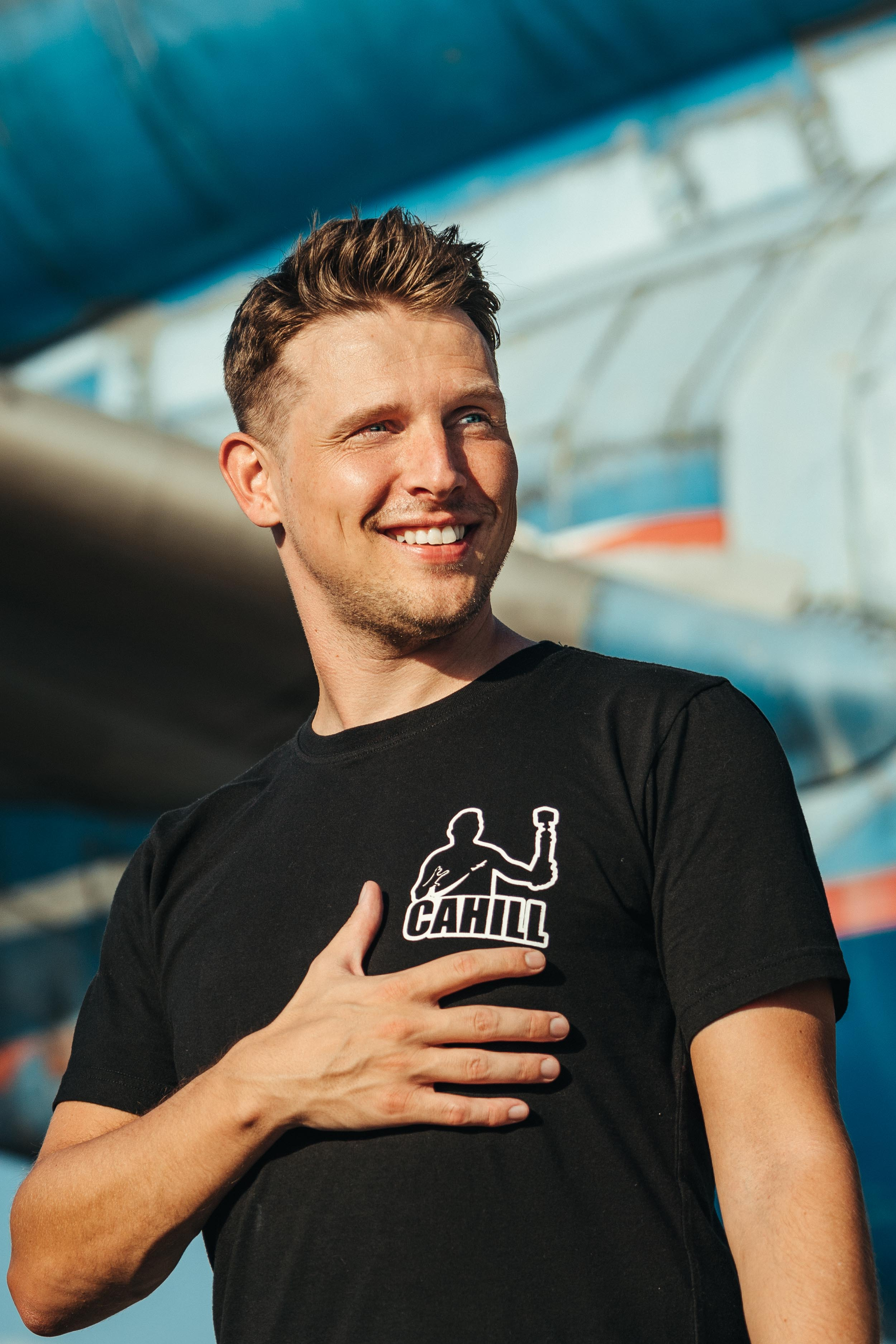
- Cahill in 2020
- Born: Aljoscha Wendholt; 17 June 1986 (age 40)
- Occupations: Aviation vlogger, airline critic

YouTube information
- Channel: @JoshCahill
- Years active: 2015–present
- Genre: Reviews
- Subscribers: 904 thousand
- Views: 188 million
- Last updated: 12 November 2026
- Website: https://gotravelyourway.com/

Josh Cahill (born Aljoscha Wendholt, 17 June 1986) is a German-Czech aviation vlogger, airline critic and blogger who presents airline reviews primarily through his YouTube channel.

== Early life ==
There are conflicting accounts of Cahill's early life. According to a Die Welt interview in 2008, Aljoscha Wendholt was born in Nordrhein-Westfalen, Germany. He moved to Saxony when he was six years old, and grew up in the village of Mildenau in Saxony. He started travelling in 2005 with his first trip to Lithuania.

In two of his own videos published in 2024, Cahill said that his mother is Czech, that they moved to Germany as refugees when he was "very young", and that he remains a Czech citizen.

A January 2025 interview with Cahill published by Airliners.de reported that he was born in Melbourne, Australia as Aljoscha Cahill-Wendholt, but moved to Germany at the age of 7 and legally changed his name to Josh Cahill in 2016. Later that year, The Australian mentioned "Melbourne-born Josh Cahill".

In a 2026 video, Cahill himself mentioned that in 2012, he decided to "come back to Australia" at the time with just 50 euros, and "no job, no plan, no backups." After spending 10 days in Perth "trying to find something," Cahill got his first job on Rottnest Island, at the Dome Cafe, living on the island while working there, until eventually being dismissed from his job. Cahill mentioned that he was glad this happened; "I wouldn't have the life that I have today for which I'm immensely grateful for" if he had stayed in hospitality. He also mentioned that those times shaped his character and "the suffering, the challenges back then" contributed to who Cahill is "today."

== Career ==
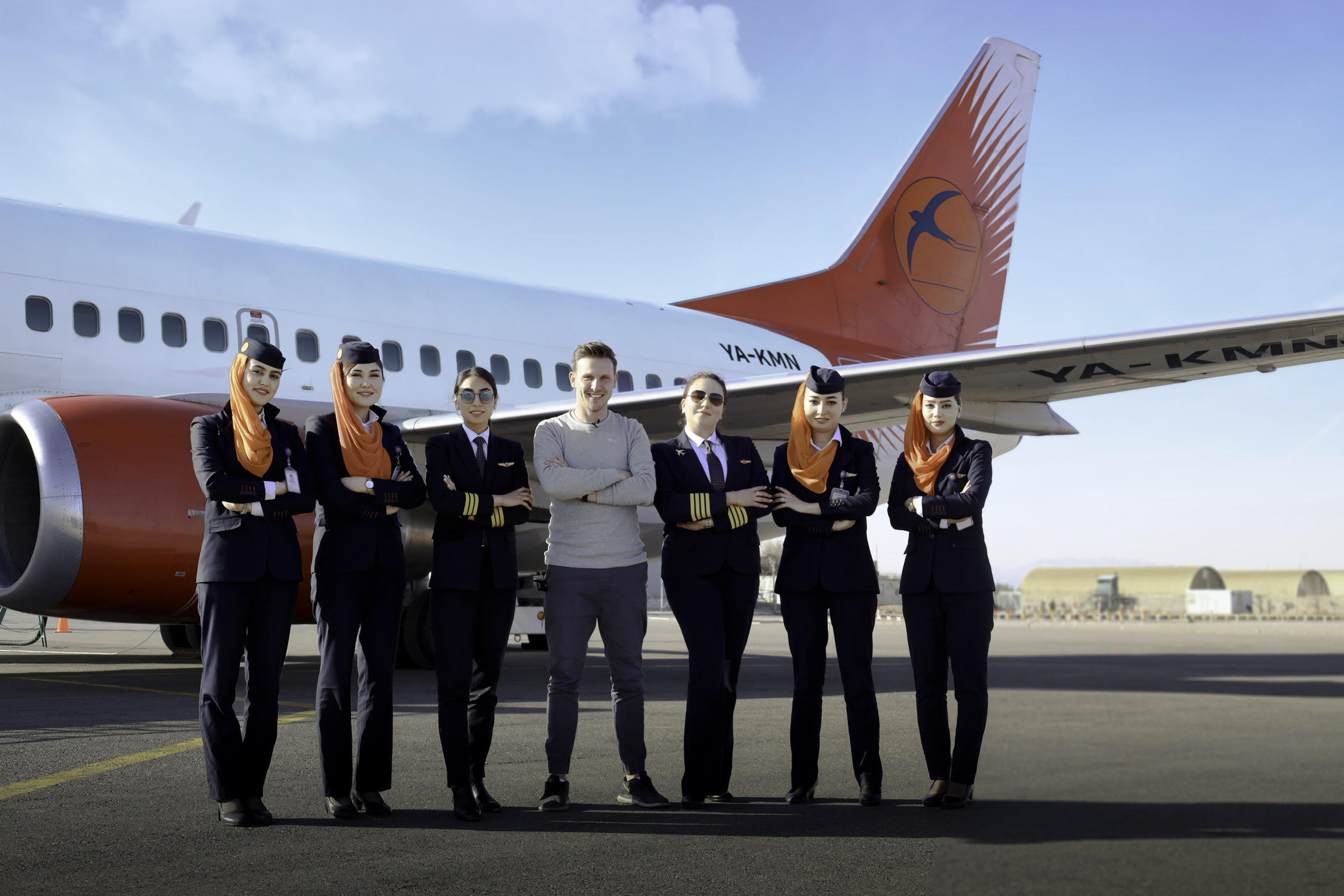
Josh Cahill poses alongside Kam Air's first all-female crew in Herat.

In 2009, after abandoning an attempt to walk 12,000 kilometres (7,500 mi) from Germany to Shanghai, China, he hitchhiked from Germany to Iran. He visited Afghanistan as a tourist in 2015, as well as North Korea in 2017.

In July 2015, Cahill posted his first flight review on his YouTube channel and has since received over 800 million views on all of his social media channels combined. His most-watched review has over 22 million views.

On 22 December 2020, Cahill and other bloggers were on board during the delivery of Uganda Airlines' first Airbus A330-800 from Toulouse to Entebbe; the delivery was led by General Katumba Wamala, the then Ugandan Minister of Works and Transport, and received by Uganda's President Yoweri Museveni.

On 24 February 2021, Cahill organised Afghanistan's first ever all-female flight from Kabul to Herat. The flight was operated by Kam Air and first featured on his channel.

Cahill has received several awards for his work, including the "Best Airline Channel" in 2018, the "Aviation Achievement Award" in 2021, the "Airline Critic of the Year" in March 2024, and the "Best Aviation Channel" in December 2024 at the German Traveller Awards.

== Incidents ==
In September 2018, on a Malaysia Airlines flight from Kuala Lumpur to London, Cahill shared his criticisms on Instagram during the flight, using the in-flight Wi-Fi. According to Cahill, the crew confronted him for the Instagram post and refused to provide him any more service unless he stopped filming. Cahill stated he received an apology email from CEO Izham Ismail which he described as a "template" apology and that "it was clearly to prevent me from getting more footage and create a bad review on my YouTube channel."

On 7 January 2020, Cahill gave a negative review to Singapore Airlines on a flight from London to Singapore, criticising the attitude of the crew and a perceived lack of engagement towards customers during service, while praising other aspects of the product such as the seating and catering. Someone claiming to be a Singapore Airlines crew member sent him a death threat, and Cahill later contacted local law enforcement, with Singapore Airlines pledging to co - operate with any investigation.

In 2020, Cahill flew on board a Tunisair Airbus A330, and shared his criticisms of its lounge and onboard facilities. In 2021, he reviewed Tunisair again, giving another negative review. Upon arrival at Tunis International Airport, he was approached by five police officers over his previous video. They asked him to hand over his camera, which he refused.

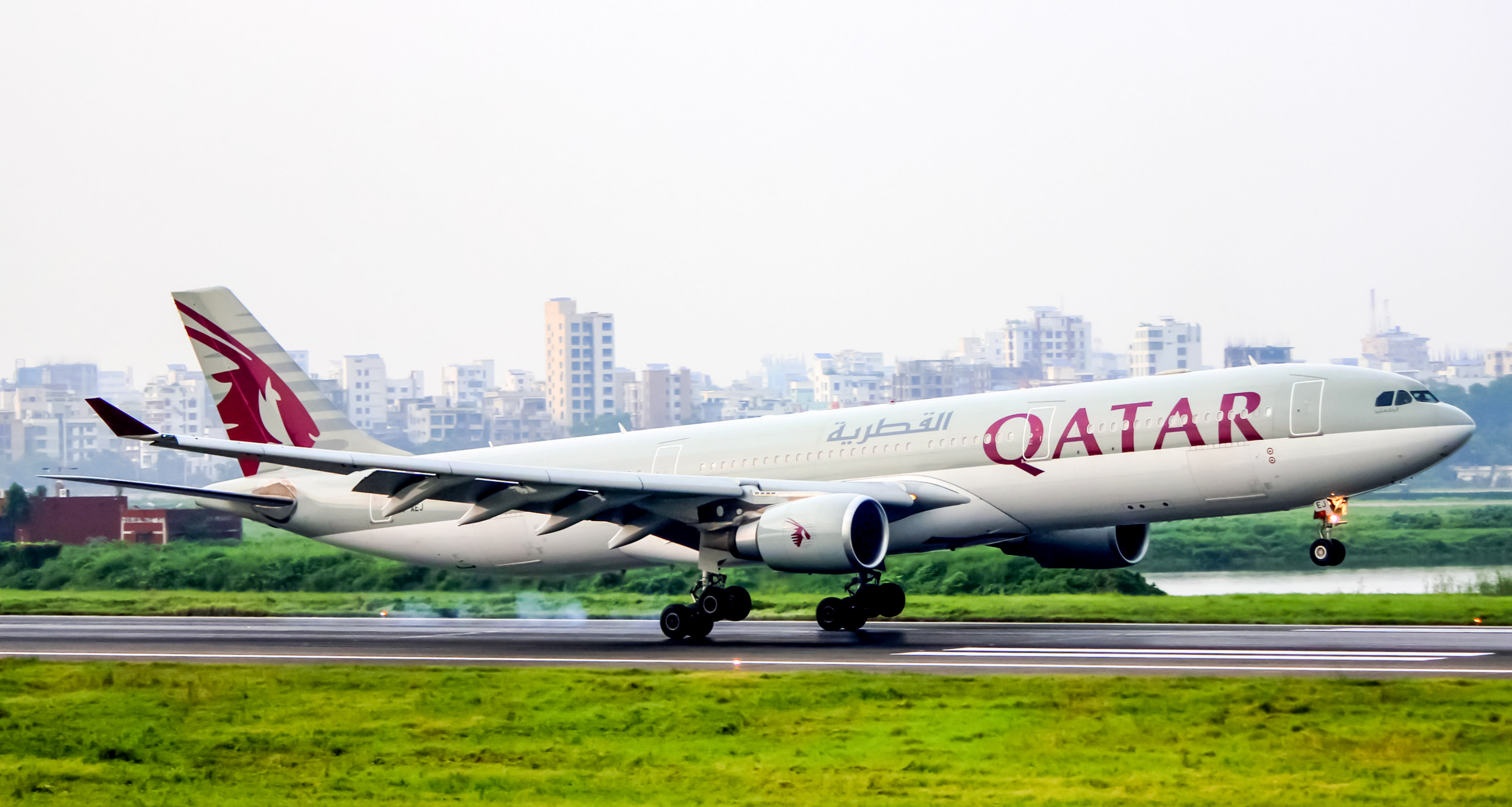
A Qatar Airways A330 - 300, the aircraft type operated on the Colombo - Doha leg of Cahill's 2023 review

In December 2023, Cahill claimed that Qatar Airways had tried to bribe him with free flights in exchange for taking down a negative review, and then banned him from the airline after he refused. Cahill had previously interviewed the then - Qatar Airways CEO Akbar Al Baker and they met on several occasions throughout 2021 prior to the dispute. Cahill was subsequently unbanned from the airline in December 2025, after writing an email to the new CEO inquiring if he was still blacklisted. A few days later, Cahill was informed that his request for the resumption of travel on Qatar's flights had been approved. The first successful flight undertaken after the ban was lifted was Boston (BOS) to Doha (DOH) in the Qsuite cabin on the A350-900.

In February 2024, an Aero Dili staff member made Cahill's passport public, saying that he did so to prove that problems at check-in had occurred because the name in Cahill's passport did not match the name on his boarding pass.

In July 2024, Luxair demanded that Cahill remove a negative review, and threatened to sue if he did not comply as his actions apparently violated Luxembourg's privacy laws; Cahill had filmed an on–camera confrontation with a Luxair lounge employee at Luxembourg Airport after being denied access to the lounge during his 7 - hour layover between Berlin and Paris, as it could only be accessed 4 hours before the flight departure time. This caveat was not appropriately disclosed on Luxair's website throughout the booking process, potentially misleading passengers like Cahill with a long layover / transit. After significant public backlash, and Cahill uploading an updated version of the review with faces of the Luxair employees blurred, the airline apologised and issued a refund to Cahill for the lounge visit. Luxair's lounge policies have since been updated on their website after an involvement from the country's Minister for Mobility.

One of the four identical Embraer E195 aircraft operated by Air Montenegro at the time of the 2026 incident

In June 2026, Cahill published a review criticising Air Montenegro for selling non-existent business class tickets, on a flight from Podgorica to Zurich, where he was moved to economy class upon arrival at the airport. The cited excuse by staff was an aircraft swap, despite the fact that Air Montenegro operated a small fleet of four identical Embraer E195s, with the exact same configuration on board each type. He was involuntarily downgraded to economy class without communication from the airline, and staff refused to process a refund on-site; Cahill remarked that this incident was likely a widespread commonplace practice, with the airline downgrading premium passengers, keeping the revenue from each ticket sold, and hoping that customers wouldn't go through the lengthy, complicated process of acquiring a refund. The incident prompted an apology from the Airline's Board of Directors, calling the downgrade unacceptable, and an internal policy review was launched. Notably, the Prime Minister publicly reposted this statement from the airline's chairman. Business class tickets are no longer available to book through Air Montenegro's website.

== Awards and nominations ==
Year	Organisation	Category	Result	Ref.
2018	Cinnamon Travel Bloggers Conference Awards	Best Airline Channel	Won	
2021	AeroTime	Aviation Achievement Award	Won	
2024	PATWA International Travel Awards	Airline Critic of the Year	Won	
2024	German Traveller Awards	Best Aviation Channel	Won	
2027	The Passport Awards	Best Airline Reviewer	Pending	
