= AVE.com =

IATA	ICAO	Call sign
P3	PHW	PHOENIX SHARJAH
- Founded: 1996 (Phoenix Aviation); October 2005 (as AVE.com)
- Ceased operations: December 30, 2012
- Operating bases: Sharjah International Airport
- Secondary hubs: Jinnah International Airport; Manas International Airport
- Headquarters: Sharjah, United Arab Emirates
- Employees: 230 (2007)
- Website: flyave.com

AVE.com was a Kyrgyz-UAE airline based in Sharjah, United Arab Emirates with its base at Sharjah International Airport, offered charter flights and aircraft lease services. AVE.com was established in 2005 by the renaming of Phoenix Aviation.

AVE.com was owned by Evgeny Khaprov and Vladimir Goncharov and (as of 2007) had 230 employees.

== History ==
Phoenix Aviation was established and started operations in 1996. It was rebranded as AVE.com in October 2005.

The airline was added to the European Union's list of air carriers subject to an operating ban in 2006 after the European Commission determined that Phoenix Aviation did not meet the relevant safety standards.

== Services ==
As Phoenix Aviation, the company operated the following services in January 2005:

- Domestic scheduled services: Bishkek and Osh.
- International scheduled services: Jinnah International Airport, Karachi.

== Fleet ==
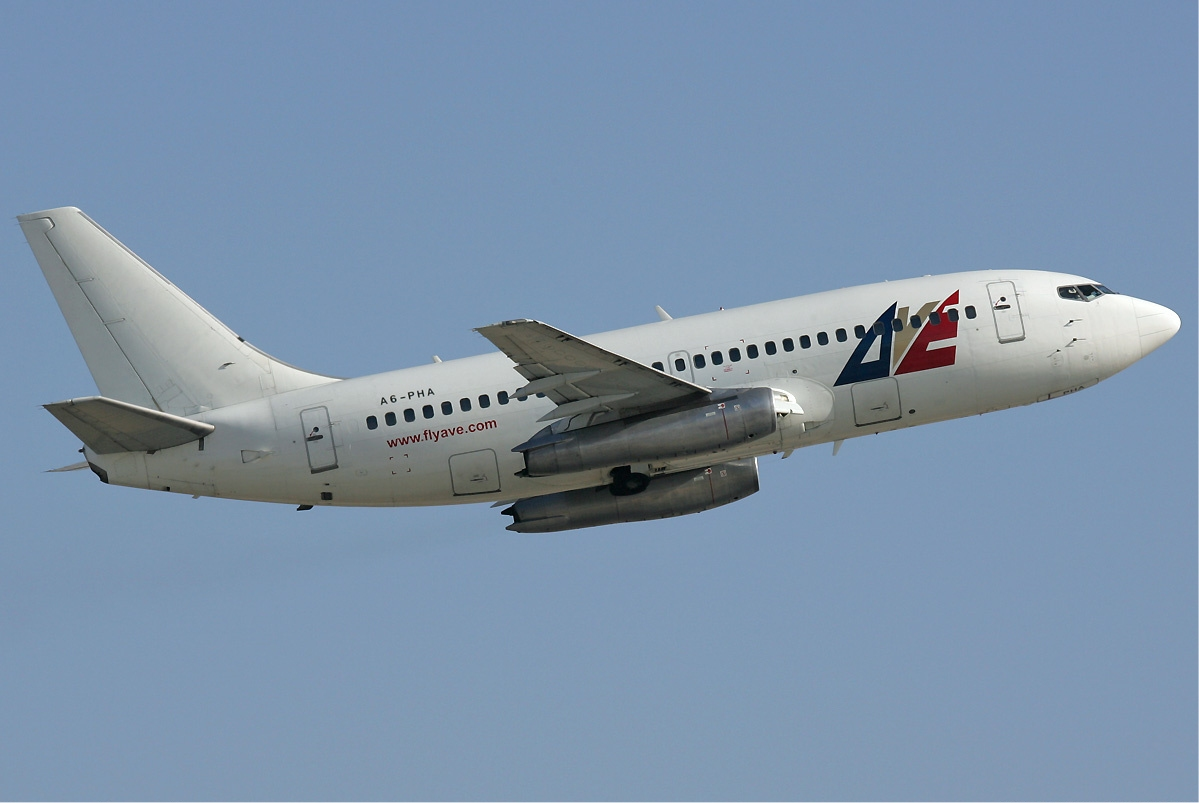
AVE.com Boeing 737-200

AVE.com operated the following aircraft:

AVE.com fleet
Aircraft	Total	Introduced	Retired	Notes
Boeing 737-200	20	2002	2011	One written off as Kam Air Flight 904
Boeing 737-300	3	2005	2012	
Boeing 767-200ER	1	2004	2006	Later written off as Dynamic Airways Flight 405

== See also ==
- List of defunct airlines of the United Arab Emirates
- List of defunct airlines of Kyrgyzstan
