= Mawlana Jalaluddin Mohammad Balkhi International Airport =

Mazar-i-Sharif International Airport میدان هوائی مزار شریف (Dari) مزار شریف نړیوال هوايي ډګر (Pashto)
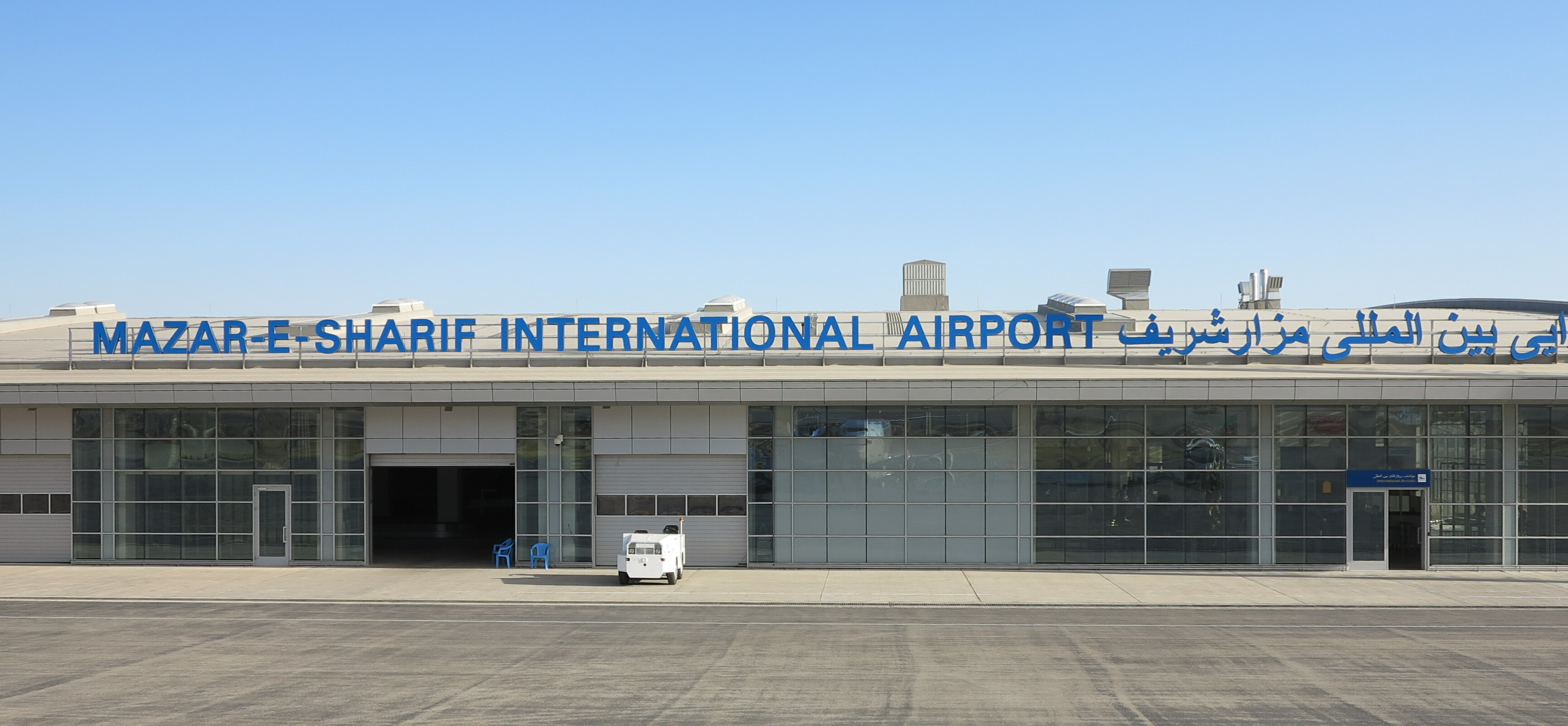
- The airport's new terminal in June 2014
- IATA: MZR; ICAO: OAMS

Summary
- Airport type: Public
- Owner: Government of Afghanistan
- Operator: GAAC Holding
- Serves: Northern Afghanistan
- Location: Mazar-i-Sharif, Balkh, Afghanistan
- Built: 1960s
- Elevation AMSL: 1,259 ft (384 m)
- Coordinates: 36°42′25″N 67°12′34″E

Map
- Location of airport in Afghanistan

Runways
Direction	Length		Surface
Direction	ft	m	Surface
06/24	9,836	2,998	Asphalt
- Sources: Landings.com, AIP Afghanistan

Mazar-i-Sharif International Airport (Note: Dari: میدان هوائی مزار شریف, romanized: Maydān-i Hawāyī-yi Mazār-i Šarīf, cyrillized: Майдони Ҳавоии Мазори Шариф, pronounced [mɐɪˈdɑːnɪ hɐwɑːˈjiːjɪ mɐˈzɑːɾɪ ʃɐˈɾiːf]; Pashto: مزار شریف نړیوال هوايي ډګر, romanized: Mazār-i Šarif Naṛəywāl Hawāyi Ḍəgǝr, pronounced [mɐˈzɑrɪ ʃɐˈrif nɐɽəɪˈwɑl hɐwɑˈji ɖəˈɡəɾ]) (IATA: MZR, ICAO: OAMS), officially called Mawlana Jalaluddin Mohammad Balkhi International Airport, is located about 9 km (5.6 mi) east of Mazar-i-Sharif in northern Afghanistan, which is around 15 minutes of driving distance from the center of the city.

Situated at an elevation of 1,259 ft (384 m) above sea level, the airport has one asphalt runway measuring around 9,836 ft × 170 ft (2,998 m × 52 m) and several taxiways, and facilities for up to 1,000 passengers. It serves much of the population of northern Afghanistan. In 2013, a sixty million euro terminal was added to the airport while the older terminal is now used for domestic flights.

Though originally constructed with 2 parallel runways, the airport's northernmost runway has since been converted into a taxiway, making it one of the largest airports in Afghanistan. The Mazar-i-Sharif rail terminal is located to the east of the airport, which is connected to the Hairatan border town in the north. The Ministry of Defense also has a military base adjacent to the airport.

Other nearby airports include Kunduz Airport in Kunduz Province to the east; Kabul International Airport in Kabul Province to the southeast; Bamyan Airport in Bamyan Province to the south; and Sheberghan Airport in Jowzjan Province to the west.

== History ==
=== Early years ===
Mazar-i-Sharif Airport in 1969

Mazar-i-Sharif Airport was built in the 1960s by the United States during the Cold War, when the Soviets and the Americans were engaged in extending political ties in the Middle East and South Asia. At that time the Soviet Union was less than 50 miles north of Mazar-i-Sharif.

During the 1970s, the airport began seeing a gradual increase in air traveling. For the first time large number of foreign tourists began arriving to see historical places in the city.

The airport was heavily used in the 1980s by the Soviet forces from which they launched daily flight missions to hit targets in the Mujahideen controlled territories of Afghanistan. It also served as one of the main hubs for deploying troops from the neighboring former Soviet Union.

=== 21st century ===
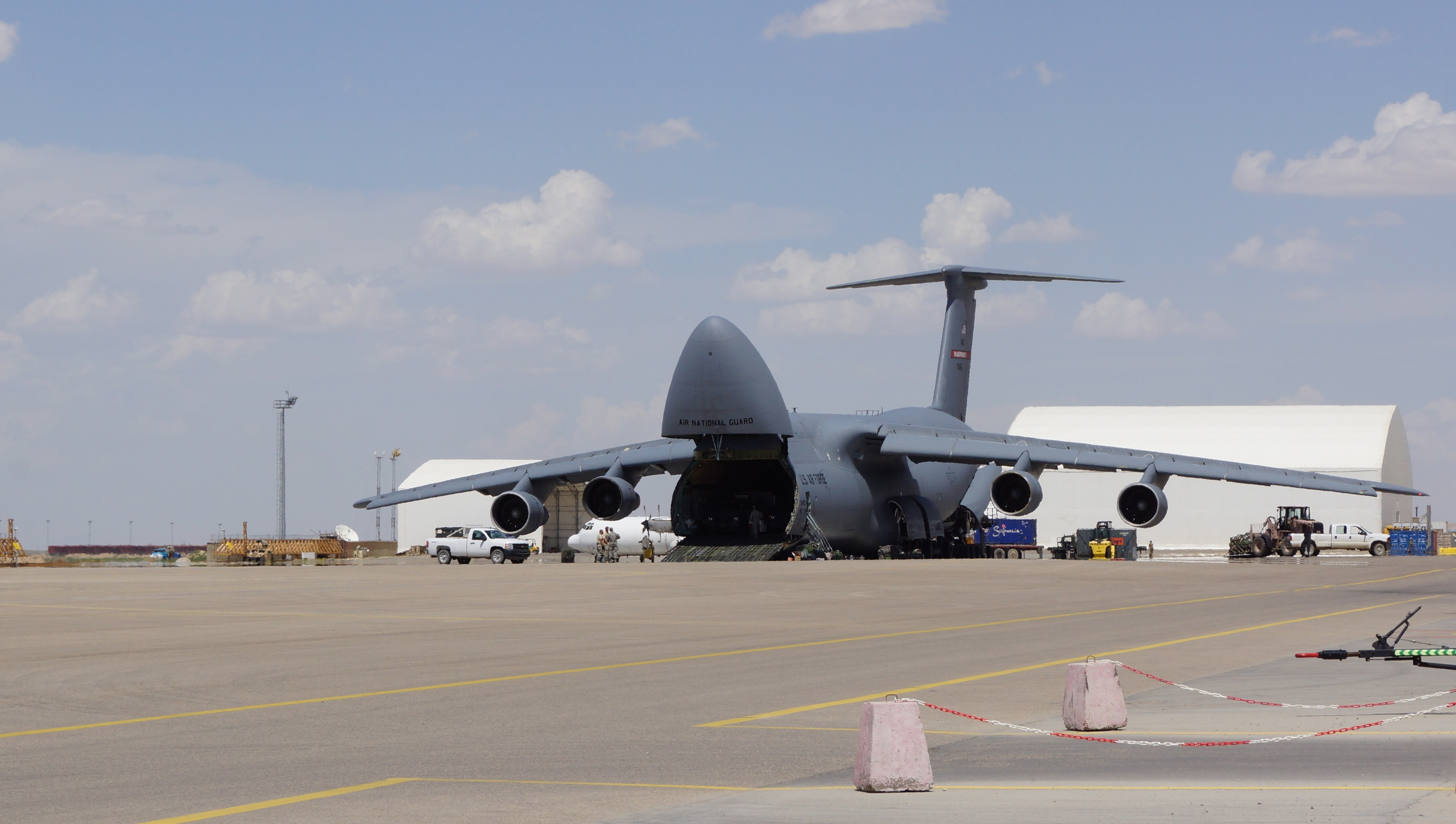
An American Lockheed C-5 Galaxy at Camp Marmal in 2012

In 2005, Camp Marmal was built next to the airport, which gradually expanded to one of the largest military bases in Afghanistan. In 2006, after Germany took command of the International Security Assistance Force (ISAF), the airfield functioned as a main hub for the exchange of personnel as well as air cargo. Since 2008 a TACAN installation for an instrument landing system was available for bad weather operation. It served all ISAF personnel, including American and Afghan Armed Forces.

Work on a new international terminal began in 2010 and was completed in 2013. A special inauguration ceremony was held in June 2013, which was attended by then-German Foreign Minister Guido Westerwelle, Afghanistan's Transport and Aviation Minister Daoud Ali Najafi, Balkh's Governor Atta Muhammad Nur and some parliamentarians. After the inauguration, the airport was given the name Mawlana Jalaluddin Mohammad Balkhi International Airport. This was to honor the renowned 13th-century poet Mawlana Jalaluddin Mohammad Balkhi, also known as Rumi. The expansion of the airport was a joint venture of Germany and the United Arab Emirates (UAE), cost 60 million euros and took about three years to complete. The project was overseen by a Turkish company.

On 30 June 2014 the Royal Netherlands Air Force detachment of General Dynamics F-16 Fighting Falcon's ended.

In August 2021, forces of the Islamic Emirate of Afghanistan (IEA) took control of the airport. The transfer of power led to a situation where as many as 1,000 people were left waiting to get out of the airport, stranded for several days. Following the return of Taliban rule, agreement was reached with the UAE that allowed GAAC to administer airport security, and with Uzbekistan to train 20 Afghan specialists in air traffic control at the airport and to replace the antiquated air navigation equipment.

== Airlines and destinations ==
As of October 2023, the following airlines provide travel services at Mazar-i-Sharif International Airport:

Airlines	Destinations
Ariana Afghan Airlines	Kabul, Mashhad; Seasonal: Jeddah
Kam Air	Kabul, Istanbul, Mashhad
Mahan Air	Tehran–Imam Khomeini
Meraj Airlines	Tehran–Imam Khomeini

== See also ==
- List of airports in Afghanistan
