= 1998 Ariana Afghan Airlines Boeing 727 crash =

1998 passenger plane crash in Kabul, Afghanistan

1998 Ariana Afghan Airlines crash
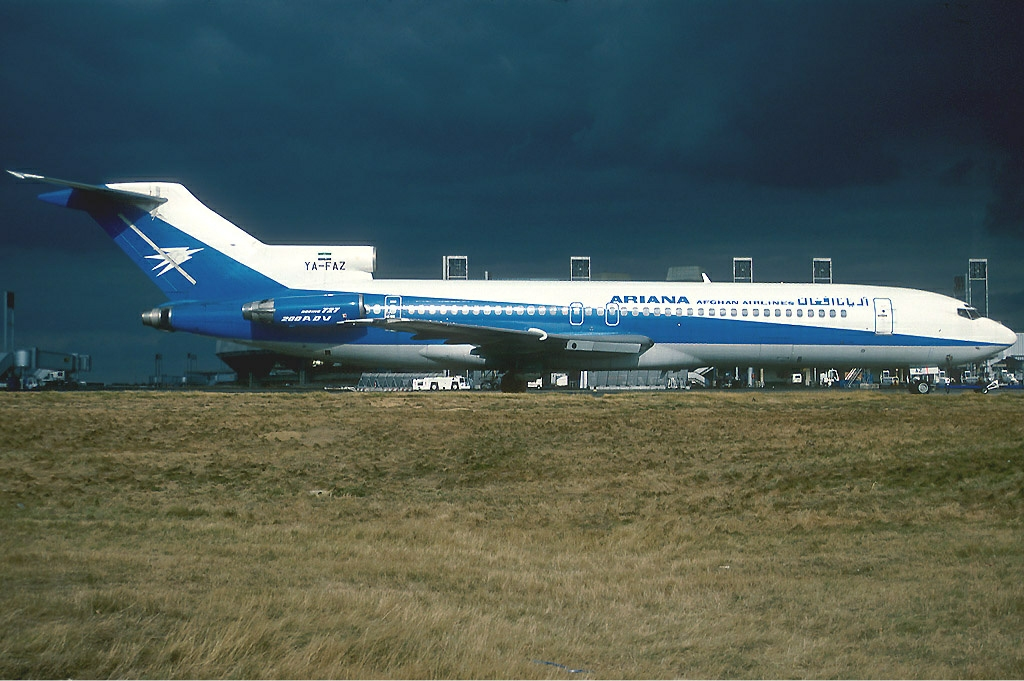
- YA-FAZ, the accident aircraft

Occurrence
- Date: 19 March 1998
- Summary: Controlled flight into terrain of undetermined cause
- Site: Shakh-e Barantay Mountain; 34°25′36″N 69°12′49″E

Aircraft
- Aircraft type: Boeing 727-228
- Operator: Ariana Afghan Airlines
- Registration: YA-FAZ
- Flight origin: Sharjah International Airport, Sharjah, United Arab Emirates
- Stopover: Kandahar Airport, Kandahar, Afghanistan
- Destination: Kabul International Airport, Kabul, Afghanistan
- Occupants: 45
- Passengers: 35
- Crew: 10
- Fatalities: 45
- Survivors: 0

On 19 March 1998, a Boeing 727 passenger jet operated by Ariana Afghan Airlines crashed on approach into Kabul, Afghanistan, killing all 45 people aboard. The flight may have been involved in smuggling and Islamist militants' operations, as Ariana was at that time controlled by the Taliban-led Islamic Emirate of Afghanistan regime.

== Accident ==
The unscheduled flight departed the city of Sharjah in the United Arab Emirates to Kabul with a stopover in Kandahar, Afghanistan. While descending for Kabul International Airport, the flight struck the Shakh-e Barantay Mountain at an altitude of 2,600 m (8,500 ft) at 13:00 local time. The crash killed all 10 crew members and 35 passengers. The weather at the time of the accident was bad, with poor visibility amid snow and rain.

== Aircraft ==
The flight was operated by a Boeing 727-228, registered YA-FAZ. The aircraft first flew on 22 January 1981, meaning at the time of the accident, it was 17.2 years old.

== Aftermath ==
During rescue operations, Taliban regime members and Ariana officials reportedly carried 32 body bags and another 15 bags with body parts recovered from the mountain. Rescue work was delayed on account of bad weather and the aircraft's wreckage being on fire until 03:00 (local time) the next day. The rescue attempt was made difficult by landmines planted in the area during the Soviet-Afghan War. An Ariana official said on 20 March that the plane was carrying 32 passengers and 13 crew members.

Even if the aircraft's black boxes were reportedly searched for, there is no trace of either a report or an investigation to determine the cause of the accident or the fate of the black boxes (possibly a consequence of the Taliban regime's international isolation). The director-general of Ariana Afghan Airlines, Hassan Jan, said the crash was a consequence of bad weather.

The crash was one of several incidents that led to Ariana Airlines being prohibited from EU airspace.

== Taliban and al-Qaeda operations ==
According to a November 2001 Los Angeles Times story, this flight may have been one of several involved in a series of smuggling runs carrying arms, money, drugs and Islamist militants between Sharjah, Pakistan and Afghanistan. Passengers on these flights reportedly included militants from both the al-Qaeda and Taliban movements, the latter of which ruled most of Afghanistan between 1996 and 2001, while also harboring Osama bin Laden. Being the regime that controlled most of Ariana's fleet and assets, as well as the airports in Kandahar and Kabul, the Taliban facilitated the flights, helping to provide fake crew and employee IDs to the militants. According to the LA Times report, the pilots of this particular flight may have been Taliban themselves. The story reports on an August 1996 incident, in which Ahmad Shah Massoud's militia stopped an Ariana 727 that was about to depart from Jalalabad Airport full of opium hidden in a fake timber cargo. US intelligence officials were reportedly aware of these flights and the use that the Taliban regime was giving to Ariana Afghan.
