= List of splits and creations of districts in Afghanistan =

This list identifies the province and district splits and reassignments made by the Afghan government in revising and remapping its administrative divisions in the early 2000s. In June 2005, the Afghan government issued a map of the 34 provinces and 398 districts of Afghanistan. This list compares that 398 district set to an earlier one produced by UNDP's AIMS in 1998, which had recognized 32 provinces and 329 districts. The 2005 version included the new provinces of Daikundi and Panjsher, and seventy new districts. Yet more districts have been decreed since 2005. Those newer splits are not recorded here.

== Northern Mainland Afghanistan ==
=== North Eastern Afghanistan ===
==== Badakhshan Province ====
- Kohistan, Shuhada, Wurduj and Yamgan Districts were split-off from Baharak District.
- Darwazi Bala District was split-off from Darwaz District.
- Arghanj Khwa, Argo, Darayim, Shiki, Tagab and Yaftali Sufla Districts were split-off from Fayzabad District.
- Khash District was split-off from Jurm District.
- Kuf Ab District was split-off from Khwahan District.
- Tishkan District was split-off from Kishim District.
- Yawan District was split-off from Ragh District.

==== Baghlan Province ====
- Dih Salah, Khwaja Hijran and Puli Hisar Districts were split-off from Andarab District.
- Fering and Gharu Districts were split-off from Khost wa Fereng District.
- Baghlan District was absorbed into Baghlani Jadid District.
- Kahmard District was transferred into Bamiyan Province.

==== Kunduz Province ====
- There weren't any changes within Kunduz Province.

==== Takhar Province ====
- Dashti Qala District was split-off from Khwaja Ghar District.
- Baharak, Hazar Sumuch and Namak Ab Districts were split-off from Taluqan District
- Khwaja Baha Wuddin District was split-off from Yangi Qala District.

=== North Western Afghanistan ===
==== Balkh Province ====
- Feroz Nakhchir District was split-off from Khulmi District, later it would be transferred to Samangan Province.
- Zari District was split-off from Kishindih District.

==== Faryab Province ====
- Qurghan District was split-off from Andkhoy District.
- Gurziwan District was split-off from Bilchiragh District.

==== Jowzjan Province ====
- Khaniqa District was split-off from Aqcha District.
- Qush Tepa District was split-off from Shibirghan District.

==== Samangan Province ====
- Dara-I-Suf District was dissolved to split and create Dara-I-Sufi Balla and Dara-I-Sufi Payan Districts.
- Feroz Nakhchir District was split-off from Khulmi District, later it would be shifted from Balkh Province.

==== Sare Pol Province ====
- Gosfandi District was split-off from Sayyad District.

== Central Mainland Afghanistan ==
=== Central Afghanistan ===
==== Kabul Province ====
- Farza District was split-off from Mir Bacha Kot District.

==== Kapisa Province ====
- Kohistan District was dissolved to split and create Hesa Awal Kohistan and Hesa Duwum Kohistan Districts.

==== Logar Province ====
- Azra District was shifted from Paktia Province.
- Baraki Barak
- Kharwar District was split-off from Charkh District.

==== Panjshir Province ====
Note - All former districts were shifted from Parwan Province.

- Hisa Awal Panjsher District District was dissolved to split and create Khenj and Paryan Districts.
- The remaining part of Hisa Duwum Panjsher District District was dissolved to split and create Darah District.
- The remaining part of Panjsher District was dissolved to split and create Anaba, Bazarak and Shotul Districts.
- Rokha District was created parts of the former Hisa Duwum Panjsher and Panjsher Districts.

==== Parwan Province ====
- Sayed Khel District was split-off from Jabal Saraj District.

==== Wardak Province ====
- Jaghatu District was shifted from Ghazni Province.

=== Eastern Afghanistan ===
==== Kunar Province ====
- Wata Pur District was split-off from Asadabad District.
- Shaygal Wa Shiltan District was split-off from Chapa Dara District.
- Ghaziabad District was split-off from Nurgal District.

==== Laghman Province ====
- There weren't any changes within Laghman Province.

==== Nangarhar Province ====
- Bihsud District was split-off from Jalalabad District.
- Kot District was split-off from Rodat District.

==== Nuristan Province ====
- Du Ab and Nurgaram Districts were split-off from Kamdesh District.

=== Western Afghanistan ===
==== Badghis Province ====
- There weren't any changes within Badghis Province.

==== Bamyan Province ====
- Sayghan District was split-off from Kahmard District, formerly from Baghlan Province.

==== Farah Province ====
- There weren't any changes within Farah Province.

==== Ghor Province ====
- Charsada, Dawlat Yar and Du Layna Districts were split-off from Chaghcharan District.

==== Herat Province ====
- There weren't any changes within Herat Province.

== Southern Mainland Afghanistan ==
=== South Eastern Afghanistan ===
==== Ghazni Province ====
- Waghaz District was split-off from Muqur District.
- Khwaja Umari and Rashidan Districts were split-off from Jeghatoo (Waeez Shahid) District.
- Khugiani District was created from parts of Waeez Shahid and Ghazni City Districts.
- Jaghatu District was transferred to Wardak Province.

==== Khost Province ====
- Shamal District was shifted from Paktia Province.

==== Paktia Province ====
- Ahmadabad District was split-off from Sayed Karam District.
- Azra District was transferred to Logar Province.
- Shamal District was transferred to Khost Province.

==== Paktika Province ====
- Terwa District was split-off from Waza Khwa District.
- Jani Khel, Yahya Khel and Yosuf Khel Districts were split-off from Zarghun Shahr District.

=== South Western Afghanistan ===
==== Daykundi Province ====
Note - All former districts were shifted from Orūzgān Province.

- Gizab District was shifted from Orūzgān Province; but returned to Orūzgān in 2006. Pato Ghar District was split-off from Gizab in 2018.
- Daykundi District was dissolved to split and create Ishtarlay, Khadir, Nili and Sangtakht Districts.
- Kiti District was split-off from Kajran District.
- Miramor District was split-off from Shahristan District.

==== Helmand Province ====
- There weren't any changes within Helmand Province.

==== Kandahar Province ====
- Miyan Nasheen District was split-off from Shah Wali Kot District.
- Zhari District was created from parts of Maywand and Panjwaye Districts.
- Naish District was shifted from Orūzgān Province.

==== Nimruz Province ====
- There weren't any changes within Nimruz Province.

==== Orūzgān Province ====
- Gizab District was transferred to Daykundi Province; later returned in 2006.
- Daykundi District was transferred to Daykundi Province.
- Kajran District was transferred to Daykundi Province.
- Shahristan District was transferred to Daykundi Province.
- Naish District was transferred to Kandahar Province.

==== Zabul Province ====
- Kakar District was split-off from Argahandab District.
- Naw Bahar District was created from parts of Shamulzayi and Shinkay Districts.

== See also ==
- Districts of Afghanistan
