= Nili District =

Nili نیلی
- District
- Location within Afghanistan
- Coordinates: 33°45′36″N 66°04′48″E
- Country: Afghanistan
- Province: Daikundi
- Capital: Nili

Area
  - Total: 445 km^{2} (172 sq mi)
- Elevation: 2,022 m (6,634 ft)

Population
  - Estimate (2025): 46,681
- Time zone: UTC+04:30 (Afghanistan Time)

Nili (Pashto (Note: Pashto pronunciation: [ni.li]): نيلي, Dari (Note: Dari pronunciation: [niː.líː]): نیلی) is one of the districts of Daikundi Province in central Afghanistan. The city of Nili serves as the capital of the province. It has an estimated population of 46,681 people. Nili Airport is located next to the city. The weather conditions in the winter are severe and many of the roads have now been repaired and asphalted.

Nili is surrounded by the districts of Ishtarlay, Shahristan, Gizab, Kiti and Khadir. Beyond the provincial seat of Nili, the villages of Nili district are: Dasht, Sari Nili, Pai Nili, Ghudar, Qol Qadir, Qom Ahmad Baeg, Ijdi, Shish, Kohna Deyh and Sangmom. Due to Daikundi's geographical inaccessibility, it was not until April 2007 that the United Nations Assistance Mission in Afghanistan opened an office in Nili.

== Profile ==
A summary report prepared by local officials in 2007 stated the following:

- Villages: 135
- Ethnic diversity: 100% Hazara.
- Schools: 15 primary, 3 secondary, 2 high schools.
- Health centers: 5.
- Main agricultural products: almond, apricot, maize, wheat.
- Primary handicrafts: embroidery, hat making, weaving.

== Notable people ==
- Azra Jafari, In December 2008-December 2013 Azra Jafari was named by Afghan President Hamid Karzai to be the mayor of Nili District, thus becoming Afghanistan's first female mayor.she was one of the successful mayors in Afghanistan.
- Muhammad Hussain Sadiqi Nili
- Nasrullah Sadiqi Zada Nili

== See also ==
- Districts of Afghanistan
