= Nili (disambiguation) =

Nili was a spy network.

Nili may also refer to:

== Places ==
- Nili District, Afghanistan
  - Nili, Afghanistan, the district's capital city
    - Nili Airport
- Nili, Iran, a village
- Nili, Mateh Binyamin, an Israeli settlement in the West Bank

== Military ==
- Nili (unit)

== People ==
- Nili Abramski (born 1970), Israeli Olympic runner
- Nili Block (born 1995), Israeli kickboxer
- Nili Brosh (born 1988), Israeli guitarist
- Nili Cohen (born 1947), Israeli legal scholar
- Nili Drori (born 1960), Israeli Olympic fencer
- Nili Rachel Scharf Gold (born 1948), Israeli-American professor of Hebrew literature
- Nili Hadida, Israeli musician and member of Lilly Wood and the Prick
- Nili Latu (born 1982), Tongan rugby player
- Nilli Lavie, Israeli-British psychologist
- Nili Lotan, Israeli fashion designer
- Nili Natkho (1982–2004), Israeli basketball player
- Nili Ohayon, stage name Onili, Israeli singer-songwriter
- Nili Tal (born 1944), Israeli journalist and documentary filmmaker
- Nili (footballer), Spanish footballer Francisco José Perdomo Borges (born 1994)
- Muhammad Hussain Sadiqi Nili (1940–1990), jihadist leader in Afghanistan
- Nasrullah Sadiqi Zada Nili (born 1966), Afghan politician

== Other uses ==
- Nili (subgroup), in the Taxonomy of Anopheles

== See also ==
- Nilly Drucker, Miss Israel 1986
- Neeli, Pakistani actress
- Neeli (film), 2018 Indian film
- Neeli (TV series), Indian supernatural soap opera
