= Sarkhosh =

Sarkhosh is a Persian surname. Notable people with the surname include:

- Amir Sarkhosh (born 1991), Iranian snooker player from Karaj
- Daria Sarkhosh (born 1985), Italian gymnast
- Dawood Sarkhosh (born 1971), ethnic Hazara singer and musician
- Sarwar Sarkhosh (1942–1983), ethnic Hazara singer and a nationalist in Afghanistan
- Vesta Sarkhosh Curtis, British Museum's Curator of Middle Eastern coins

== See also ==
- Sarkhoshk
- Sarkhoshev
