= Sarwar Danish =

Afghan politician

Muhammad Sarwar Danish
- محمد سرور دانش
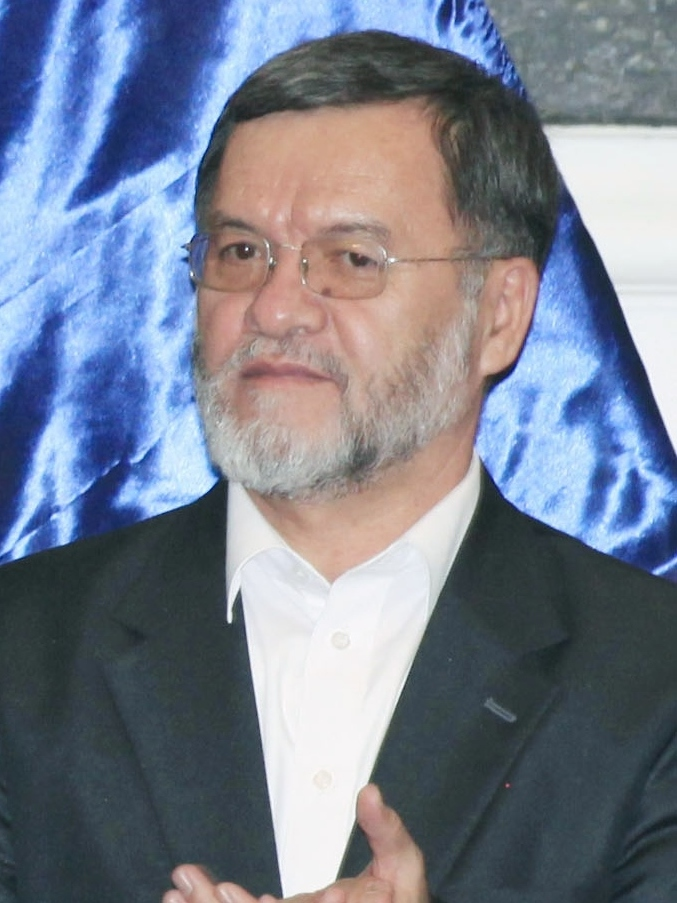
- Danish in 2014

Second Vice President of Afghanistan
- In office 29 September 2014 – 15 August 2021
- President: Ashraf Ghani
- Preceded by: Karim Khalili
- Succeeded by: Mullah Yaqoob (as Second Deputy Leader)

Higher Education Minister of Afghanistan
- In office 1 January 2010 – 29 September 2014
- President: Hamid Karzai
- Preceded by: Mohammad Azam Dadfar
- Succeeded by: Abdollah Obeid

Justice Minister of Afghanistan
- In office 23 December 2004 – 1 January 2010
- President: Hamid Karzai
- Preceded by: Abbas Karimi
- Succeeded by: Habibullah Ghaleb

1st Governor of Daykundi
- In office 28 March 2004 – 22 December 2004
- Succeeded by: Abdul Hai Neamati

Personal details
- Born: Muhammad Sarwar; 1961 (age 64–65) Ishtarlay District, Kingdom of Afghanistan
- Party: Hezbe Wahdat (to 2022) Afghanistan Justice and Freedom Party (from 2022)

Muhammad Sarwar Danish (Pashto; Dari: محمد سرور دانش, born 1961) is an Afghan academic and politician in exile who was the second vice president of Afghanistan, from 2014 to 2021. He was previously the acting minister of justice from 2004 to 2010 and acting minister of higher education from 2010 to 2014. When Daykundi province was carved out of Urozgan province in 2004, Danish became its first governor.

== Early years and education ==
Danish, the son of Muhammad Ali, was born in 1961 in the Ishtarlay District of Daykundi province in central Afghanistan. He belongs to the Hazara ethnic group. As a Shia Muslim, he completed his higher education in the holy Iranian city of Qom, where he earned degrees in law, journalism and Islamic studies, receiving a master's degree in Fiqh. From 1982 until 2001, he wrote various publications, including 15 books and 700 academic essays. Along with Dari and Pashto, he also became fluent in the Arabic language.

== Karzai administration ==
After the Taliban regime was ousted and the Karzai administration was formed, Danish was involved in the 2002 loya jirga. He was a member of the Constitutional Drafting Commission through a decree by President Hamid Karzai and as a participant in the Constitutional Loya Jirga. Following Karzai's election as president in 2004, Danish became Justice Minister and renounced his membership to Hezbe Wahdat as per Constitutional law.

== Ghani administration ==
Under President Ashraf Ghani, Danish served as the second vice president in both terms, first with vice president Abdul Rashid Dostum and then Amrullah Saleh following the 2019 elections. In 2021 after Kabul fell to the Taliban, Danish and associates escaped the country and eventually stayed in Turkey. In December 2021 he was resettled in New Zealand.

== See also ==
- Cabinet of Afghanistan
- Afghan Ministry of Justice

Political offices
Preceded by Karim Khalili	Second Vice President of Afghanistan; 2014–2021 with Abdul Rashid Dostum; Amrullah Saleh; Served under: Ashraf Ghani	Succeeded by Mullah Yaqoob as Second Deputy Leader
