= Gizab =

Gizab گیزاب
- Town
- Location
- Coordinates: 33.3813°N 66.2655°E
- Country: Afghanistan
- Province: Daykundi
- District: Gizab
- Elevation: 1,364 m (4,475 ft)

Population (2012)
  - Total: 12,000
- Time zone: +4:30

Gizab (Persian: گیزاب) is the capital of the Gizab District of Daykundi Province, Afghanistan. It is located along the Helmand River.

== History ==
Gizab was transferred in 2004 from Uruzgan Province to Daykundi Province, and then re-annexed to Uruzgan Province in 2006. Later, it was transferred to Daykundi Province now with New Government it transferred back to Uruzgan.

== Climate ==
With an influence from the local steppe climate, Gizab features a continental semi-arid (BSk) under the Köppen climate classification. The average temperature in Gizab is 13.3 °C, while the annual precipitation averages 453 mm.

July is the hottest month of the year with an average temperature of 27.8 °C. The coldest month January has an average temperature of -3.6 °C.

Climate data for Gizab
Month	Jan	Feb	Mar	Apr	May	Jun	Jul	Aug	Sep	Oct	Nov	Dec	Year
Record high °C (°F)	16.1 (61.0)	22.7 (72.9)	32.6 (90.7)	35.0 (95.0)	40.3 (104.5)	43.5 (110.3)	44.2 (111.6)	42.9 (109.2)	39.5 (103.1)	33.7 (92.7)	30.7 (87.3)	20.9 (69.6)	44.2 (111.6)
Mean daily maximum °C (°F)	0.7 (33.3)	0.6 (33.1)	9.4 (48.9)	19.4 (66.9)	26.6 (79.9)	31.7 (89.1)	34.3 (93.7)	33.1 (91.6)	28.9 (84.0)	22.3 (72.1)	13.4 (56.1)	5.8 (42.4)	18.9 (65.9)
Daily mean °C (°F)	−3.6 (25.5)	−3.2 (26.2)	4.4 (39.9)	13.3 (55.9)	20.5 (68.9)	25.2 (77.4)	27.8 (82.0)	26.9 (80.4)	22.7 (72.9)	16.6 (61.9)	8.2 (46.8)	1.0 (33.8)	13.3 (56.0)
Mean daily minimum °C (°F)	−7.8 (18.0)	−7.0 (19.4)	−0.6 (30.9)	7.2 (45.0)	14.3 (57.7)	18.7 (65.7)	21.2 (70.2)	20.6 (69.1)	16.5 (61.7)	10.8 (51.4)	3.0 (37.4)	−3.9 (25.0)	7.7 (46.0)
Record low °C (°F)	−29.4 (−20.9)	−28.8 (−19.8)	−14.7 (5.5)	−10.2 (13.6)	−4.4 (24.1)	1.1 (34.0)	6.0 (42.8)	5.9 (42.6)	−1.4 (29.5)	−4.5 (23.9)	−9.7 (14.5)	−25.1 (−13.2)	−29.4 (−20.9)
Average precipitation mm (inches)	78 (3.1)	99 (3.9)	104 (4.1)	61 (2.4)	20 (0.8)	2 (0.1)	2 (0.1)	1 (0.0)	0 (0)	6 (0.2)	32 (1.3)	48 (1.9)	453 (17.9)
Source 1: Climate-Data.org
Source 2: NASA Power (Extremes 1990-2021)

== See also ==
- Daykundi Province
