= Shirin Mohseni =

Afghan politician (born 1980)

Afghanistan Parliament

Personal details
- Born: 1980 (age 44–45) Shahristan, Daykundi, Afghanistan
- Occupation: Politician
- Ethnicity: Hazara

Shirin Mohseni (Dari: شیرین محسنی) is an ethnic Hazara politician from Afghanistan, who represented the people of Daykundi in the 15th and 16th terms of the Afghanistan Parliament.

== Early life ==
Shirin Mohseni was born in 1980 in Shahristan District of Daykundi province. She completed her schooling at "Bint Al-Huda High School" in Daykundi and received her bachelor's degree in jurisprudence and law from Khatam Al-Nabieen University in Kabul.

== See also ==
- List of Hazara people
