= Mohammad Hussain Sadiqi Nili =

Hazara leader (1940–1990)

Mohammad Hussain Sadiqi Nili محمدحسین صادقی نیلی
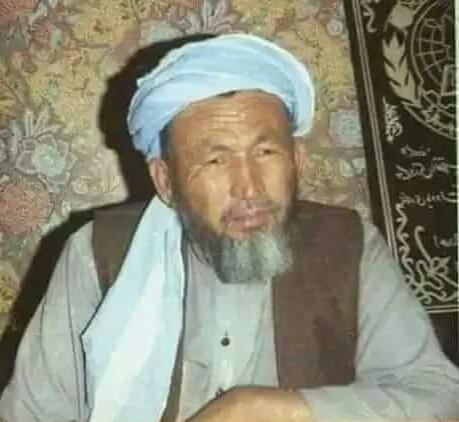
- Born: 1940; Nili, Uruzgan (now Daikundi), Afghanistan
- Died: 15 November 1990 (aged 49–50); Nili, Uruzgan (now Daikundi), Afghanistan
- Cause of death: Shooting
- Occupations: Jihadist, Politician
- Political party: Hezbe Wahdat

Muhammad Hussain Sadiqi Nili (Persian: محمدحسین صادقی نیلی), commonly known as Sadiqi Nili (صادقی نیلی) was a prominent Hazara jihadist leader in Afghanistan.

== Early life ==
Muhammad Hussain Sadiqi Nili was born in 1940 into a Hazara family in the Nili village of Daikundi province. He received his early religious education in his hometown before traveling to Najaf, Iraq, in 1970 for advanced religious studies.

== Death ==
On 15 November 1990, Muhammad Hussain Sadiqi Nili was assassinated in his home in Nili, Daikundi by members of the Islamic Movement of Afghanistan, who shot him through a window. In the attack, both he and his three-year-old son were killed.

== See also ==
- List of Hazara people
- Nasrullah Sadiqi Zada Nili
