= Shakardokht Jafari =

Afghani physicist (born 1977)

Shakardokht Jafari شکردخت جعفری
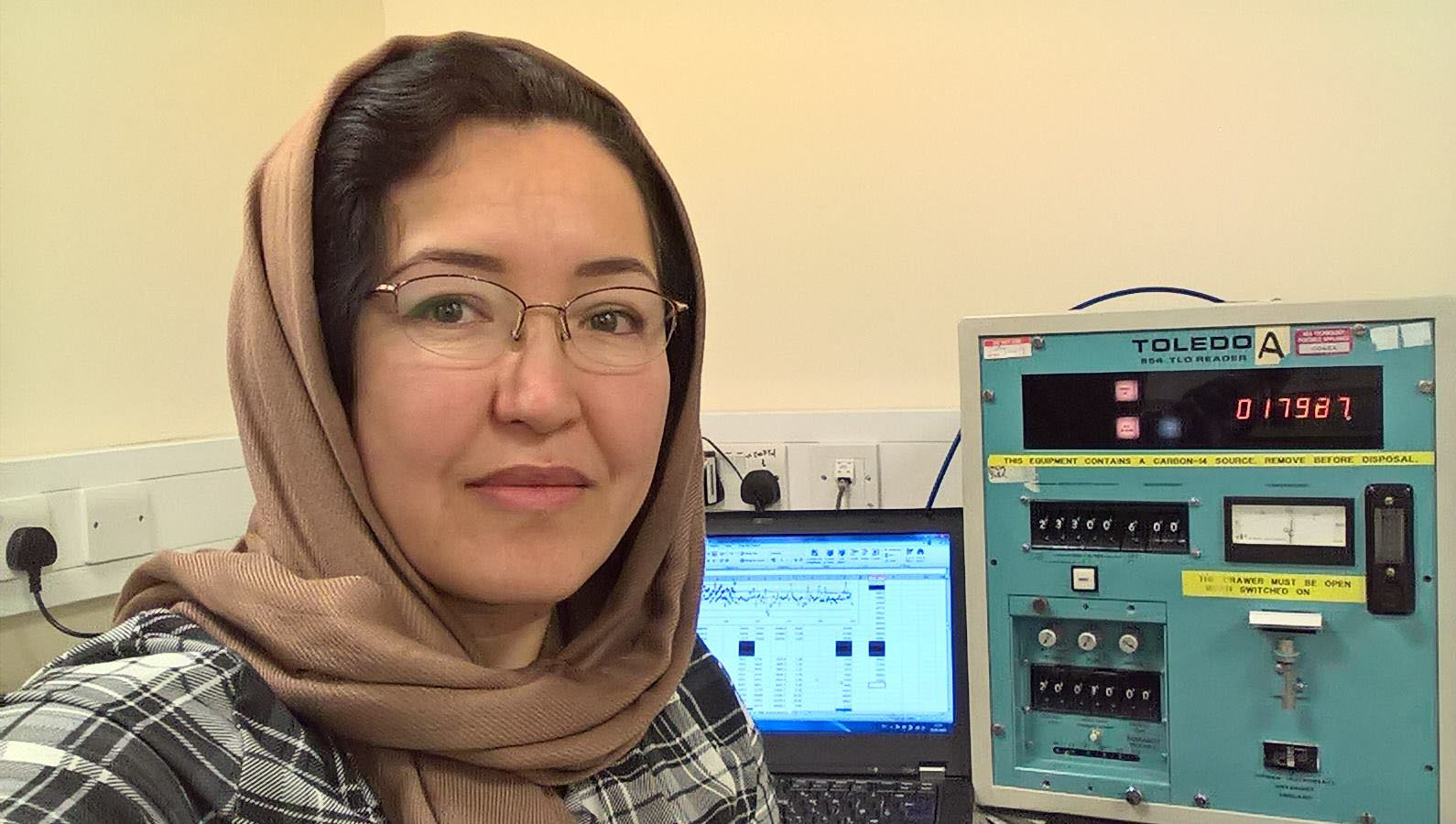
- Shakardokht Jafari in her Surrey lab
- Born: 1977 (age 48–49); Urozgan (Daykundi), Republic of Afghanistan
- Education: University of Surrey; Kabul Medical University; Tabriz University of Medical Sciences; Tehran University of Medical Sciences
- Employer(s): Portsmouth Hospitals NHS Trust; TRUEinvivo Ltd
- Website: www.trueinvivo.co.uk

Shakardokht "Shakar" Jafari (Dari: شکردخت جعفری) is a British-Afghan medical physicist and an award-winning innovator based at the Surrey Technology Centre. She developed an efficient and low-cost method of measuring a medical dose of radiation.

== Early life and education ==
Jafari was born in Daykundi, Afghanistan in 1977. Jafari and her family were forced to leave Afghanistan when war broke out, and at the age of six she spent six months travelling as a refugee to Iran. When she turned 14, her father told her she must marry her cousin. However, she managed to convince her parents and the cousin to cancel the marriage. This meant she could continue her education. Losing her sister to illness due to a lack of proper medical care inspired her to hope and fight for better medical practices. Following the death of her father due to cancer, Jafari was inspired by a strong motivation to effect change and immersed herself in the field of cancer care.

Jafari completed her BSc in radiation technologies (Note: Several references state that Jafari studied "radiology", but this is not correct. Radiology is a different discipline. Jafari is not a radiologist.) at Tabriz University of Medical Sciences in 2000. After moving back to Afghanistan in 2004, Jafari taught in the Kabul Medical University. and completed a master's degree in radiation physics there while working. In 2010 she moved to the University of Surrey to study a master's in medical physics. In 2014 she appeared on Manoto, a Persian television network, discussing her career and education. In 2015 she became the first Afghan woman to earn a PhD in Medical Physics. She was awarded the Schlumberger Foundation Faculty for the Future award for her second year of studies.

== Research and career ==
Jafari developed a string of tiny calibrated silica beads that can be used to measure radiation inside a patient's body. She demonstrated that the amount of radiation each bead receives can be measured using a simple thermoluminescence reader. The glass beads cost significantly less than contemporary Dosimeters and also address the dosimetric challenges of modern radiotherapy techniques. They ran proof-of-concept experiments at Queen Alexandra Hospital in Portsmouth. She was inspired to create the beads because of the lack of cancer treatment in Afghanistan, where her father died prematurely of cancer. In 2016 Jafari became one of 15 women entrepreneurs to win a £50,000 Innovate UK Infocus Award. She is the founder and CTO of TRUEinvivo. A patent for her technology was granted in 2019. Jafari is part of the UK Sirius programme for graduate entrepreneurs.

In 2018 Jafari featured in the SPIE Women in Optics planner.

== Personal life ==
Jafari met her husband Ibrahim in 1998 and they have three children. She discovered she was pregnant with her third child a few days after learning that she herself had cancer. Her consultant surgeon at the Queen Alexandra Hospital in Portsmouth told her it would be possible to keep the baby. Jafari was able to have chemotherapy while pregnant and said they "want baby Sina to be a message of hope to other families". After an anxious and exhausting pregnancy, her son was born safely.

== Awards ==
- Grant Thornton Entrepreneurial Excellence Award, 2015
- Sirius Programme 2015: Outstanding Achievement Award
- Grant Thornton award for Best Game Changing Enterprise, 2015
- Women in Innovation 2016
- Surrey Business Awards 2018: Business Innovation of the Year
- Guildford Innovation Awards, 2018: Innovation in Healthcare (as TRUEinvivo)
- SETsquared Partnership @20 Impact Award, 2022 (as TRUEinvivo)
- Innovator of the Year at the Dynamic Awards 2024
- Innovate UK Women in Innovation Award 2024

== Publications ==
=== Patents ===
- US patent 10488530B2, Shakardokht Jafari, "Fibre coupled luminescent bead dosimeter", issued 26 November 2019, assigned to TRUEinvivo Ltd
- WO application 2017033029A1, Shakardokht Jafari, "Fibre coupled luminescent bead dosimeter", published 2 March 2017, assigned to TRUEinvivo Ltd
- EP patent 3341754B1, Shakardokht Jafari, "Fibre coupled luminescent bead dosimeter", issued 6 January 2021, assigned to TRUEinvivo Ltd

=== Papers ===
- Jafari S. M., Bradley, D. A., Gouldstone C. A., Sharpe P. H. G., Alalawi A., Jordan T. J., Clark C. H., Nisbet A., Spyrou N.M., 2014. Low-cost commercial glass beads as dosimeters in radiotherapy. Radiation Physics and Chemistry, 97, 95–101.
- Jafari S.M., Jordan T.J., Hussein M., Bradley D.A., Clark C.H., Nisbet A., Spyrou N.M., 2014. Energy response of glass bead TLDs irradiated with radiation therapy beams. Radiation Physics and Chemistry, 104, 208–211.
- Amani I. Alalawi, S.M. Jafari, M.A. Najem, W. Alsaleh, C.H. Clark, A. Nisbet, F. Abolaban, R.P. Hugtenburg, M. Hussein, Khalid S. Alzimami, D.A. Bradley, N.M. Spyrou, 2014. Preliminary investigations of two types of silica-based dosimeter for small-field radiotherapy. Radiation Physics and Chemistry, 104, 139–144.
- Jafari S. M., Alalawi A. I., Hussein M., Alsaleh W., Najem M. A., Bradley D.A., Spyrou N.M., Clark C.H., Nisbet A., 2014. Glass beads and Ge-doped optical fibres as thermoluminescence dosimeters for small field photon dosimetry. Physics in Medicine and Biology, 59: 6875–6889.
- Bradley D. A., Abdul Sani S. F., Alalawi A. I., Jafari S.M., Noor Noramaliza M., Hairul Azhar A. R, Mahdiraji G. A., Tamchek N., Nisbet A. 2014. Development of tailor-made silica fibres for TL dosimetry. Radiation Physics and Chemistry, 104, 3–9.
- Round W. H., Jafari S., Kron T., Azhari H. A., Chhom S., Hu Y. M., Mauldon G. F., Cheung K. Y., Kuppusamy T., Pawiro S. A., Lubis L. E., Soejoko D. S., Haryanto F., Endo M., Han Y., Suh T. S., Ng K. H., Luvsan-Ish A., Maung S. O., Chaurasia P. P., Jafri M. A., Farrukh S., Peralta A., Toh H. J., Shiau A. C., Krisanachinda A., Suriyapee S., Vinijsorn S., Nguyen T. C., 2015 Brief histories of medical physics in Asia-Oceania. Australasian Physical and Engineering Science in Medicine, DOI: 10.1007/s13246-015-0342-9. 38 (3), 381–398.
- Jafari S. M., Jordan T. J. · Distefano G., Bradley D. A., Spyrou N. M., Nisbet A., Clark C. H, Feasibility of using glass bead thermo-luminescent dosimeters for radiotherapy treatment plan verification, BJR, https://dx.doi.org/10.1259/bjr.20140804
- Jafari S.M., Bates N.M., Jupp T. Abdul Sani S.F., Nisbet A., Bradley D.A. 2016. Commercial glass beads as TLDs in radiotherapy produced by different manufacturers. Radiation Physics and Chemistry, doi:10.1016/j.radphyschem.2015.12.025, 137, 181–186.
- Bradley D.A., Jafari S.M., Siti Shafiqah A.S., Tamcheck N., Shutt A., Siti Rozaila Z., Abdul Sani S.F., Sabtu S. N., Alanazi A., Amouzad Mahdiraji G. · Abdul Rashid H.A. Maah M.J. 2016. Latest Developments in Silica-Based Thermoluminescence Spectrometry and Dosimetry. Applied Radiation and Isotopes, DOI: 10.1016/j.apradiso.2015.12.034, 117, 128-134
- Abdul Sani S.F., Hammond R., Jafari S.M., Wahab N., Amouzad Mahdiraji G., Siti Shafiqah A.S., Abdul Rashid H.A., Maah M.J., Aldousari H., Alkhorayef M., Alzimami M., Bradley D.A., 2016. Measurement of a wide range of X-ray doses using specialty doped silica fibres Radiation Physics and Chemistry, 137, 49-55
- Bradley D.A. · Siti Shafiqah A.S. · Siti Rozaila Z. · Sabtu S.N. · Abdul Sani S.F. · Alanazi A.H. · Jafari S.M. · Amouzad Mahdiraji G. · Mahamd Adikan F.R. · Maah M.J. · Nisbet A.N. · Tamchek N. · Abdul Rashid H.A. · Alkhorayef M. · Alzimami K. 2016. Developments in production of silica-based thermoluminescence dosimeters. Radiation Physics and Chemistry, 137, 37-44
- G Distefano, J Lee, S Jafari, C Gouldstone, C Baker, H Mayles, CH Clark 2017, A national dosimetry audit for stereotactic ablative radiotherapy in lung Radiotherapy and Oncology 122 (3), 406-410
- SM Jafari, G Distefano, J Lee, C Gouldstone, H Mayles, T Jupp, A Nisbet, 2017, Feasibility study of silica bead thermoluminescence detectors (TLDs) in an external radiotherapy dosimetry audit programme Radiation Physics and Chemistry 141, 251-256
- Palmer A.L., Jafari S.M., Mone J., Muscat S., 2017, Evaluation and clinical implementation of in vivo dosimetry for kV radiotherapy using radiochromic film and micro-silica bead thermoluminescent detectors, Physica Medica, (42) 47–54.
- SK Nabankema, SM Jafari, SC Peet, D Binny, SR Sylvander, SB Crowe, 2017, Wearable glass beads for in vivo dosimetry of total skin electron irradiation treatments, Radiation Physics and Chemistry, 140: 314-318
- Y.M. Abubakar, M.P.Taggart, A.Alsubaie, A.Alanazi, A.Alyahyawi, A.Lohstroh, A.Shutt, S.M.Jafari, D.A.Bradley, Characterisation of an isotopic neutron source: A comparison of conventional neutron detectors and micro-silica glass bead thermoluminescent detectors, Radiation Physics and Chemistry, 140, 2017, 497-501
- Palmer A.L., Nash D., Kearton J., Jafari S.M., Muscat S., A multicentre ‘end to end’ dosimetry audit of motion management (4DCT-defined motion envelope) in radiotherapy, Radiotherapy and Oncology 125(3), 2017, 453-458
- Ley K., Jafari S.M., Lohstroh A., Shenton-Taylora C., Bradley D.A., Thermoluminescent response of beta-irradiated silica beads, Radiation Physics and Chemistry, 2018, in press.
- Alyahyawi A., Dimitriadis A., Jafari S.M., Lohstroh A., Alanazi A., Alsubai A., Clark C.H., Nisbet A., Bradley D.A., Thermoluminescence measurements of eye-lens dose in a multi-centre stereotactic radiosurgery audit, Radiation Physics and Chemistry, 2018, In press.
- Isolan L., Sumini M., Teodori F., Bradley D.A., Jafari S., Mariotti F., Buontempo F., Dosimetric analysis and experimental setup design for in-vivo irradiation with a Plasma Focus device, Radiation Physics and Chemistry, 2018, in press
- Ley K., Jafari S.M., Lohstroh A., Bradley D.A., Investigations of thermoluminescent silica beads of different manufacturers and colours, Radiation Physics and Chemistry, 2018, In press.

=== Conference proceedings ===
- Jafari s. M., Feasibility of using glass bead TLDs for a postal dosimetry audit of MV radiotherapy photon beams, IUPESM 2015, World Congress on Medical Physics and Biomedical Engineering. 7 – 12 June, Toronto Canada.
- Jafari S. M. et al., Characterisation of commercial glass beads as TLDs in radiotherapy 13th International Symposium on Radiation Physics 2015 September 7–11 Beijing, China
- Jafari S., Gouldstone C., Sharpe P.H.G., Bradley D.A., Clark C.H., Nisbet A., Spyrou N.M., 2013. Characterisation of Glass Beads for Radiotherapy Dosimetry. 7th UK and RI Postgraduate Conference in Biomedical Engineering and Medical Physics 9–11 July, Guildford, Surrey, UK, p. 15, 2013 University of Surrey ISBN 978-1-84469-028-2
- Jafari, S. M., Gouldstone, C. A., Sharpe, P. H. G., Alalawi, A., Jordan, T. J., Bradley, D. A., Clark, C. H., Nisbet, A., Spyrou, N.M. 2014a. Low-cost commercial glass beads as dosimeters in radiotherapy. The 1st International Conference on Dosimetry and its Applications (ICDA-1) in Prague - Dosimetry in Medicine and Biology, June 23–28, 2013, Prague, Czech Republic 100. České vysoké učení technické v Praze Fakulta jaderná a fyzikálně inženýrská
- Alalawi A., Jafari S. M., Najem M., Clark C. H., Nisbet A., Abolaban F., Hugtenburg R., Hussein M., Alzimami K., Spyrou N. M., Bradley D. A., 2013. Comparison of Ge-doped TL optical fibres and glass beads with ion chamber and Gafchromic film for small field photon dosimetry. The 1st International Conference on Dosimetry and its Applications (ICDA-1) in Prague - Dosimetry in Medicine and Biology, June 23–28, 2013, Prague, Czech Republic 76. České vysoké učení technické v Praze Fakulta jaderná a fyzikálně inženýrská
- Najem M.A., Alrushoud A., Jafari S. M., Podolyak Z., Spyrou N. M.. Dosimetric Properties of Varian TrueBeam with and without Flattening Filter: A Monte Carlo Simulation. 7th UK and RI Postgraduate Conference in Biomedical Engineering and Medical Physics 9–11 July, Guildford, Surrey, UK, p. 42, © 2013 University of Surrey ISBN 978-1-84469-028-2

=== Published abstracts ===
- Thomas R., Jafari S. M., Bradley D. A., Spyrou N. M., Nisbet A., Clark C. H., Dosimetric characterisation of glass bead TLDs in proton beams. European society for radiotherapy and oncology conference 33 (ESTRO33) 4–8 April 2014 Vienna Austria, Radiother. Oncol. Vol. 111, Supplement 1, April 2014, ISSN 0167-8140, p 317
- Jafari S. M., Distefano G., Bradley D. A., Spyrou N. M., Nisbet A., Clark C. H., Validation of glass bead TLDs for radiotherapy treatment verification. European society for radiotherapy and oncology conference 33 (ESTRO33) 4–8 April 2014 Vienna Austria, Radiother. Oncol. Vol. 111, Supplement 1, April 2014, ISSN 0167-8140, p 316.
- Dimitriadis A., Hussein M., Jafari SM, Kirkby K.J., Nisbet A., Clark C.H, Does the delivery technique impact the effect S.of respiratory motion in Stereotactic Ablative Body Radiotherapy? European society for radiotherapy and oncology conference 33 (ESTRO33) 4–8 April 2014 Vienna Austria, Radiother. Oncol. Vol. 111, Supplement 1, April 2014, ISSN 0167-8140, p 649.
- Jafari S. M., Distefano G., Lee J., Gouldstone C., Mayles H., Bradley D. A., Spyrou N. M., Nisbet A., Clark C. H. Feasibility of using glass bead TLDs for a postal dosimetry audit of MV radiotherapy photon beams. European society for radiotherapy and oncology conference (3rd ESTRO Forum) 24–28 April 2015 Barcelona Spain, Radiother. Oncol. Vol. 115, Supplement 1, April 2015, ISSN 0167-8140, p 876.
- Distefano G., Jafari S. M., Lee J., Gouldstone C., Mayles H., Clark C. H., UK SABR Consortium Lung Dosimetry Audit; Absolute dosimetry results. European society for radiotherapy and oncology conference (3rd ESTRO Forum) 24–28 April 2015 Barcelona Spain, Radiother. Oncol. Vol. 115, Supplement 1, April 2015, ISSN 0167-8140, S75-S76, p 96.
- Lee. J., Mayles. H., Jafari. S. M., Distefano. G., Clark. C. H., UK SABR Consortium Lung Dosimetry Audit; Relative dosimetry GafChromic film results. European society for radiotherapy and oncology conference (3rd ESTRO Forum) 24–28 April 2015 Barcelona Spain, Radiother. Oncol. Vol. 115, Supplement 1, April 2015, ISSN 0167-8140, S74-S75, p 95.
- Jafari S. M., Distefano G., Lee J., Gouldstone C., Mayles H., Bradley D. A., Spyrou N. M., Nisbet A., Clark C. H., Feasibility of using glass bead TLDs for a postal dosimetry audit of MV radiotherapy photon beams, World Congress on Medical Physics and Biomedical Engineering 2015, Toronto, Canada from June 7 to 12, 2015.
- Jafari S. M., Distefano G., Lee J., Gouldstone C., Mayles H., Bradley D. A., Spyrou N. M., Nisbet A., Clark C. H., Feasibility of using glass bead TLDs for a postal dosimetry audit of MV radiotherapy photon beams. UK Radiation Oncology Conference (UKRO) Ricoh Arena in Coventry on 8 – 10 June 2015.
- Clark C H., Distefano G, Jafari S M., Lee J, Gouldstone C, Mayles H, UK SABR consortium lung dosimetry audit; absolute dosimetry results, UK Radiation Oncology Conference (UKRO) Ricoh Arena in Coventry on 8 – 10 June 2015.
- Lee. J, Mayles. HMO, Baker. CR, Jafari. SM, Distefano. G, Clark. CH. UK SABR Consortium lung dosimetry audit; Relative dosimetry results, UK Radiation Oncology Conference (UKRO) Ricoh Arena in Coventry on 8 – 10 June 2015.
- AL Palmer, D Nash, S Jafari, S Muscat, Development of a novel ‘end to end’dosimetry audit of motion management in radiotherapy, Radiotherapy and Oncology 123, S116-S117
- AL Palmer, SM Jafari, J Mone, S Muscat, In-vivo dosimetry for kV radiotherapy: clinical use of micro-silica bead TLD & Gafchromic EBT3 film, Radiotherapy and Oncology 123, S419-S420
- Douralis A., Jafari S.M., Polack W., Palmer A.L., HDR Brachytherapy dosimetry: Clinical use of micro-silica bead TLD & Gafchromic EBT3 film, European society for radiotherapy and oncology conference (3rd ESTRO Forum) 20–24 April 2018, Barcelona Spain, Radiother. Oncol. ESTRO 37 abstract book, S572
- S. Babaloui, S. Jafari, A.L. Palmer, W. Polak, M.W.J. Hubbard, T. Skopidou, A. Lohstroh, R. Jaberi, Feasibility of using Micro Silica Bead TLDs for 3D dosimetry in brachytherapy, European society for radiotherapy and oncology conference (ESTRO 38) 25–30 April 2019, Milan, Radiotherapy and Oncology Volume 133, Supplement 1, Pages S1185–S1186
