= Mohammed Hashim Watanwal =

Afghan politician

Hasham Watanwal
- Born: 1952
- Died: 17 July 2011 (aged 58–59); Kabul
- Occupation: Wolesi Jirga representative

Hasham Watanwal (1952–2011) was a representative for Uruzgan Province to Afghanistan's national legislature, the Wolesi Jirga, until his assassination in a Taliban attack in Kabul on July 17, 2011.

According to the Afghan Biographies profile, during the communist era he was Deputy Minister of Internal Affairs. According to the profile, he is from the Tajik ethnic group, and graduated from Kabul University with a science degree.

== Post-Taliban political career ==
Watanwal was elected to the Wolesi Jirga in 2005 and 2010.

In 2007, Watanwal hosted a press conference to draw attention to security concerns in Uruzgan. He asserted that "anti-government elements" controlled all of Gizab district and "vast swathes" of Char Chino, Dehrawod, Chora and Khas Uruzgan. Watanwal attributed the rise of militancy in Uruzgan to ISAF's reckless disregard for civilian lives.

In March 2011, Watanwal was selected to be the Deputy Chair of the Wolsi Jirga's Defence And Territorial Affairs Committee.

In May 2011, he was one of the hosts for a delegation of visiting Australian Parliamentarians.
