= Sarwar Sarkhosh =

Hazara nationalist

Sarwar Sarkhosh سرور سرخوش

Background information
- Born: 1942; Urozgan Province (now in Daykundi Province), Afghanistan
- Died: 1983 (aged 40–41)
- Occupation: Singer-songwriter
- Instruments: Dambura, Ghaychak

Sarwar Sarkhosh (Dari: سرور سرخوش) was an ethnic Hazara renowned singer and a nationalist in Afghanistan. He was the older brother of Dawood Sarkhosh, a celebrated singer known for his contributions to Hazara music.

== Early life ==
Sarwar Sarkhosh was born in 1942 in Urozgan Province (now part of Daykundi Province), Afghanistan.

== Death ==
In 1983, he traveled from his hometown of Uruzgan to Badghis. Shortly after returning, he was killed in a terrorist attack.

== See also ==
- Dawood Sarkhosh
- List of Hazara people
