= Shahidi Hassas District =

Shahid-e-Hassas شهید حساس
- District
- Location within Afghanistan
- Coordinates: 32°55′12″N 65°28′48″E
- Country: Afghanistan
- Province: Uruzgan

Shahidi Hassas District (also called Caher Cineh - pronounced char chineh) is a district of Uruzgan Province, Afghanistan.

== Government ==
Since 2006 government presence has gradually been reduced to a radius of five km around the district centre. In the Tagab area there has been no government presence at all since 2006.
