= Azra Jafari =

Afghan politician and women rights advocate

- عذرا جعفری
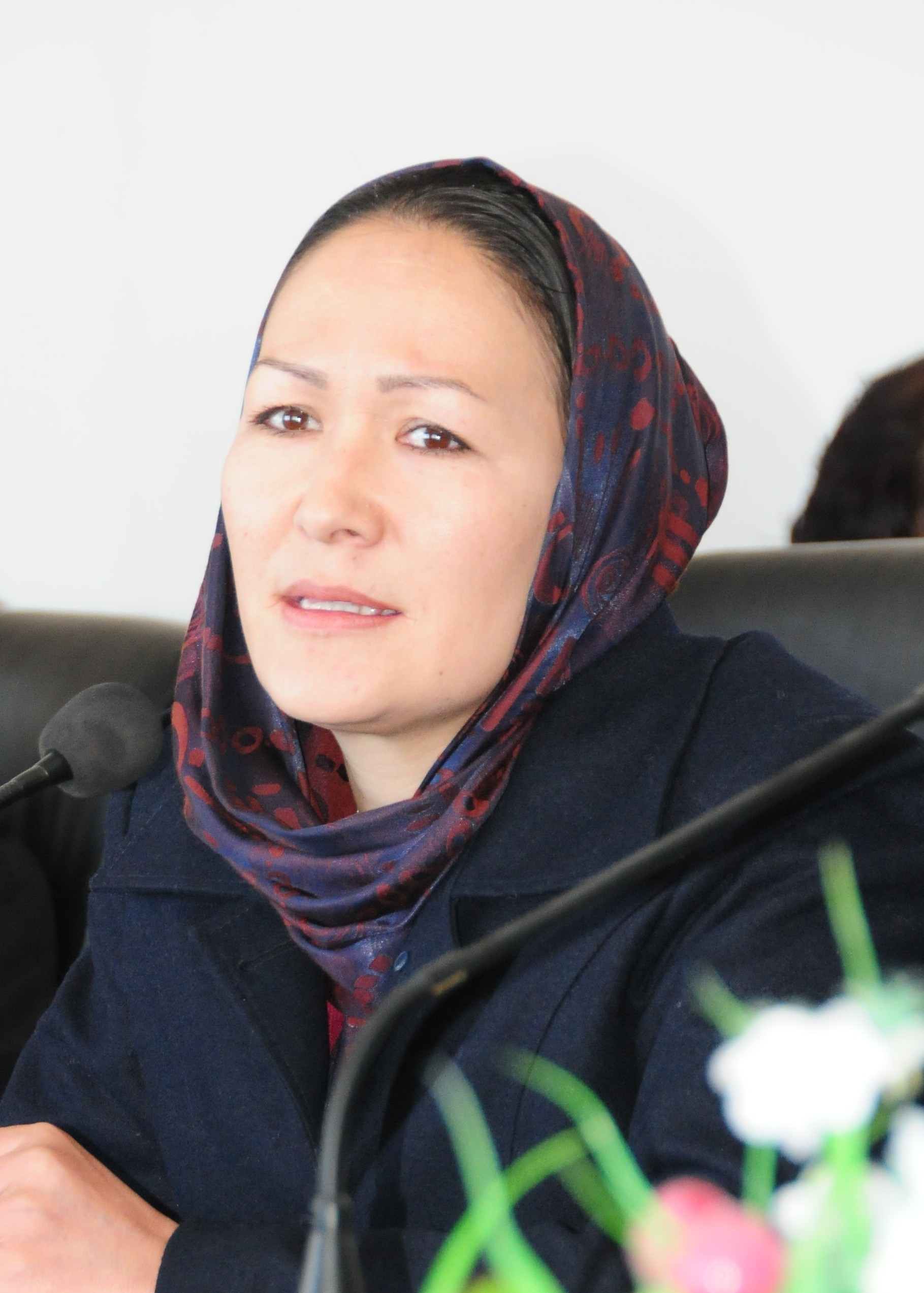
- Azra Jafari, Nili mayor, addressing the audience in 2012

Mayor of Nili, Daikundi
- In office December 2008 – January 2014
- President: Hamid Karzai
- Governor: Qurban Ali Oruzgani

Personal details
- Born: Azra Jafari; 1978 (age 47–48) Afghanistan
- Occupation: Mayor, writer
- Award(s): Meeto Memorial Award for Young South Asians 2011

Azra Jafari (Dari: عذرا جعفری; born 1978 or 1979) is an Afghan politician and women's rights advocate who became the first female mayor in Afghanistan appointed by President Hamid Karzai in December 2008. She became the mayor of Nili, a town in Daykundi Province of Afghanistan. She belongs to the Hazara ethnic group.

Jafari has lived in the United States since 2014.

== Personal life ==
Jafari was born into a Hazara family. She grew up in Ghor Province. During the Afghan civil war of the 1990s, Jafari fled to Iran as a refugee, where she completed high school and subsequently ran a school for refugee children.

She has a daughter, born in the early 2000s. She is a Shia Muslim.

== Career ==
Azra Jafari was editor-in-chief of Afghan social and cultural magazine Farhang in 1998. Later, she established an elementary school for Afghan refugees in Iran while she was working as Officer in Charge in Refugees' Cultural Center.

After the removal of the Taliban in late 2001 and the establishment of the new western-backed Karzai administration, she returned and participated in the 2002 loya jirga in Kabul.

She continued her education at Midwifery school in Kabul 2005.

In December 2008, she was appointed mayor of the town of Nili, becoming the first and till then the only female mayor in Afghanistan. As mayor, Jafari faced a lack of infrastructure. She regularly traveled to Kabul to request government funds.

Since 2014, Jafari has lived in Maryland, United States, having fled Afghanistan following threats from the Taliban.

== Publications ==
Jafari has been involved in the writing of two books. She contributed to The Making of the New Constitution of Afghanistan, which is about the political system and processes in Afghanistan and was published in 2003. Her other book, I am a Working Woman, talks about employment law and the rights of Afghan women in the labour market, and was published in 2008. I am a Working Woman is specifically aimed at readers with low literacy.

== Awards ==
Azra Jafari has been awarded the Meeto Memorial Award at the Pakistan National Council of the Arts for her work and commitment to social development.

== See also ==
- List of Hazara people
