= Nili Airport =

Nili Airport Dari: فرودگاه نیلی
- IATA: none; ICAO: OANL

Summary
- Airport type: Public
- Owner: Afghanistan
- Operator: Ministry of Transport and Civil Aviation
- Serves: Daykundi Province
- Location: Nili, Afghanistan
- Elevation AMSL: 7,260 ft / 2,213 m
- Coordinates: 33°44′27″N 066°09′24″E

Map
- Location of airport in Afghanistan

Runways
| Direction | Length | | Surface |
| Direction | m | ft | Surface |
|---|---|---|---|
| 18/36 | 414 | 4,487 | Gravel |
- Sources: Google Earth, Landings.com,

Nili Airport (Dari: فرودگاه نیلی; Pashto: د نیلی هوائی ډګر; ICAO: OANL) is located about one kilometer by road from the center of Nili, which is the capital of Daykundi Province in Afghanistan. It is a domestic airport under the country's Ministry of Transport and Civil Aviation (MoTCA), and serves the population of Daykundi Province. Security in and around the airport is provided by the Afghan National Security Forces. It has been used in the past mostly for emergency relief purposes.

Situated at an elevation of 7,260 feet (2,213 m) above sea level, Nili Airport has one gravel runway measuring around 4,487 by 90 feet (1,368 m × 27 m). A new terminal was added in 2011 with assistance and support from the International Security Assistance Force (ISAF). The airport can handle small civilian and military aircraft. Former Afghan President Ashraf Ghani had promised in 2014 that he would modernize Nili Airport, which would mean (among other things) upgrading its runway to an asphalt surface.

Other nearby major airports are Chaghcharan Airport in neighboring Ghor Province to the north, Bamyan Airport in Bamyan Province to the northeast, Ghazni Airport in Ghazni Province to the east, Tarinkot Airport in Uruzgan Province to the south, Farah Airport in Farah Province to the west, and Herat International Airport in Herat Province to the northwest.

== See also ==
- List of airports in Afghanistan
- List of airlines of Afghanistan
