= Dawood Sarkhosh =

Hazara singer and musician from Afghanistan

Dawood Sarkhosh داوود سرخوش
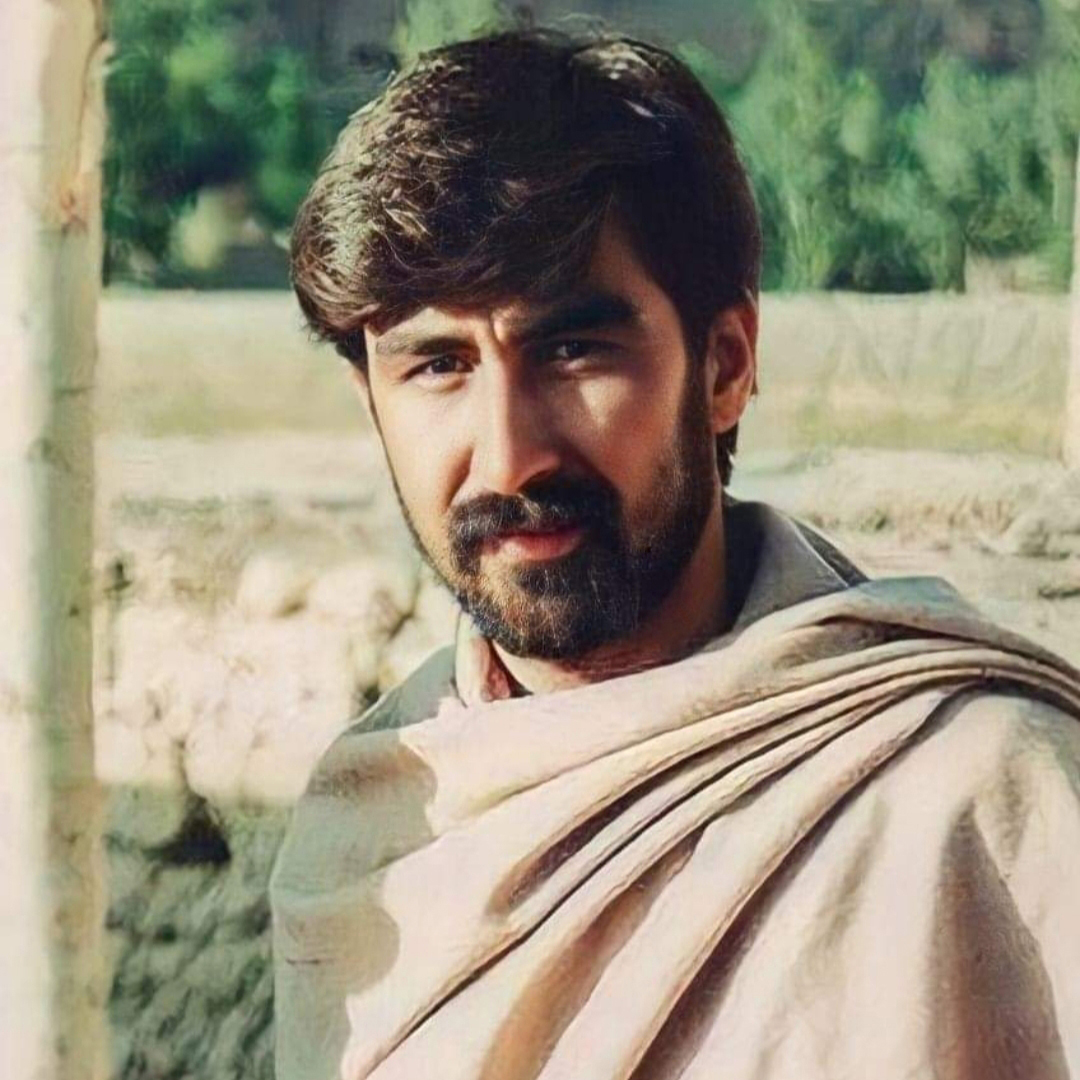

Background information
- Also known as: Sarkhosh
- Born: Muhammad Dawood; 26 April 1971 (age 54); Urozgan, (now Daykundi); Kingdom of Afghanistan
- Genres: Pop, Folk
- Occupations: Singer-songwriter, musician, composer
- Instruments: Dambura, Keyboard, Harmonium and vocals
- Years active: 1995–present
- Website: dawoodsarkhosh.com

Dawood Sarkhosh (also spelled as Daud Sarkhosh) (Persian: داوود سرخوش) is an ethnic Hazara singer and musician.

== Early life ==
Dawood Sarkhosh was born on 26 April 1971 in Urozgan (now Daykundi), Afghanistan. Sarkhosh's inspiration was his older brother Sarwar Sarkhosh, a nationalist and legendary musician of his times who was killed during the civil war. Sarkhosh learned playing dambura and singing from him at the age of seventeen. After that Sarkhosh migrated to Pakistan first to Peshawar city then moved to Quetta, Pakistan.

== Career ==
Sarkhosh revived his skills by singing and composing songs inspired by a sense of nationalism and suffering in exile. He did not sing for commercial gain, but out of nostalgia and to convey the feelings about refugee life as experienced by refugees of Afghanistan dispersed throughout the world. They went to his concerts in their thousands, marking Sarkhosh's rise as a singer. It was in Quetta that he mastered the harmonium under the Pakistani composer Arbab Ali Khan.

== Discography ==
- 1998: Sarzamin-e-Man (My Homeland, Dari: سرزمین من).
- 2000: Parijo (Fairy, Dari: پری جو).
- 2004: Sapid-o-Siah (Black and White, Dari: سپید و سیاه).
- 2005: Khana-e-Gilli (Mud House, Dari: خانه گلی).
- 2007: Oslo Concert
- 2008: Maryam (Maryam a girl's name, Dari: مریم).
- 2010: Bazi (Game/play, Dari: بازی).
- 2016: Jang-o-jonoon (War and madness, war and insanity, Dari: جنگ و جنون) released by Sarkhosh Music inc Canada.
- 2016: concert in the capital cities of Australia.
- December 2017 concert in the capital cities of Canada
- 2019: concert in Finland, Austria, Sweden.
- 2019: Man o To, (Me and You, Dari: من و تو).
- 2019: concert in the capital cities of Australia and New Zealand.

== See also ==
- List of Hazara people
