= Miramor District =

Miramor میرامور
- District
- Location within Afghanistan
- Coordinates: 33°49′48″N 66°56′24″E
- Country: Afghanistan
- Province: Daykundi

Area
  - Total: 2,363 km^{2} (912 sq mi)
- Elevation: 1,900 m (6,200 ft)

Population (2005)
  - Total: 78,506

Miramor (Dari/Hazaragi: میرامور), is a district in Daykundi province in central Afghanistan. It was created in 2005 from former Shahristan district.
