= Kiti District =

Kiti گیتی
- District
- Location within Afghanistan
- Coordinates: 33°32′24″N 65°43′12″E
- Country: Afghanistan
- Province: Daykundi

Area
  - Total: 1,453 km^{2} (561 sq mi)
- Elevation: 1,400 m (4,600 ft)

Population (2005)
  - Total: 59,974

Kiti or Giti (Dari: گیتی), is a district in Daykundi province in central Afghanistan. It was created in 2005 from the former Kajran district. The main village Kiti is at 1,783 m altitude.

== District profile ==
- Villages: 180.
- Schools: 20 primary, 3 high schools, 1 religious.
- Health centers: 2 clinics, 1 maternity clinic.
- Main agricultural products: almond, fig, apricot.
