= Nasrullah Sadiqi Zada Nili =

Hazara politician from Afghanistan

Sadiqi Zada Nili صادقی‌زاده نیلی
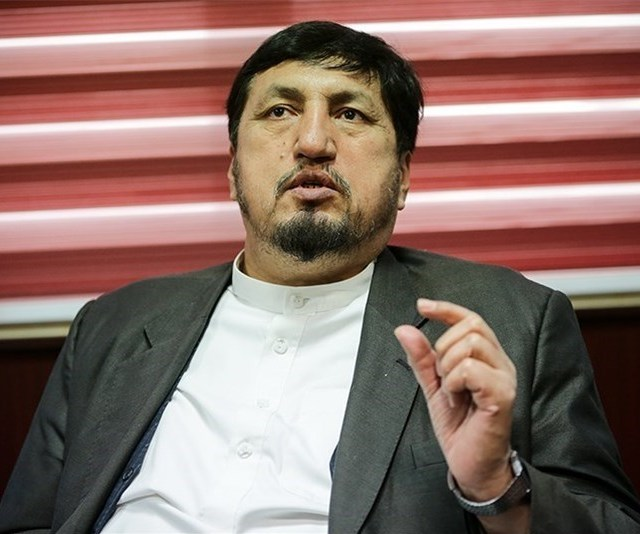
- Sadiqi Zada Nili in 2015

National Assembly

Personal details
- Born: 1966 (age 59–60) Nili, Daikundi, Afghanistan
- Occupation: Politician
- Ethnicity: Hazaras

Nasrullah Sadiqi Zada Nili (Persian: نصرالله صادقی‌زاده نیلی), commonly known as Sadiqi Zada Nili (صادقی‌زاده نیلی) is an ethnic Hazara politician from Afghanistan. He served as the representative of the Daikundi Province during the fifteenth and sixteenth parliamentary sessions of the Afghanistan Parliament.

== Early life ==
Nasrullah Sadiqi Zada Nili, son of the jihadist leader Muhammad Hussain Sadiqi Nili, was born on 1966 in Nili District of Daikundi Province. Sadiqi Zada Nili has a bachelor's degree in Islamic sciences. He was a commander in the Nili district and a member of the Hizb-e-Wahdat Party when was a single and united party during the Jihad in Afghanistan.

In December 2015, Sadiqi Zada Nili was taken hostage by the Taliban while visiting his home province of Daikundi. After enduring nine hours in captivity, he managed to escape and make his way to government forces for safety.

== See also ==
- List of Hazara people
- Mohammad Hussain Sadiqi Nili
