= Nili, Daikundi =

Nili نیلی
- City
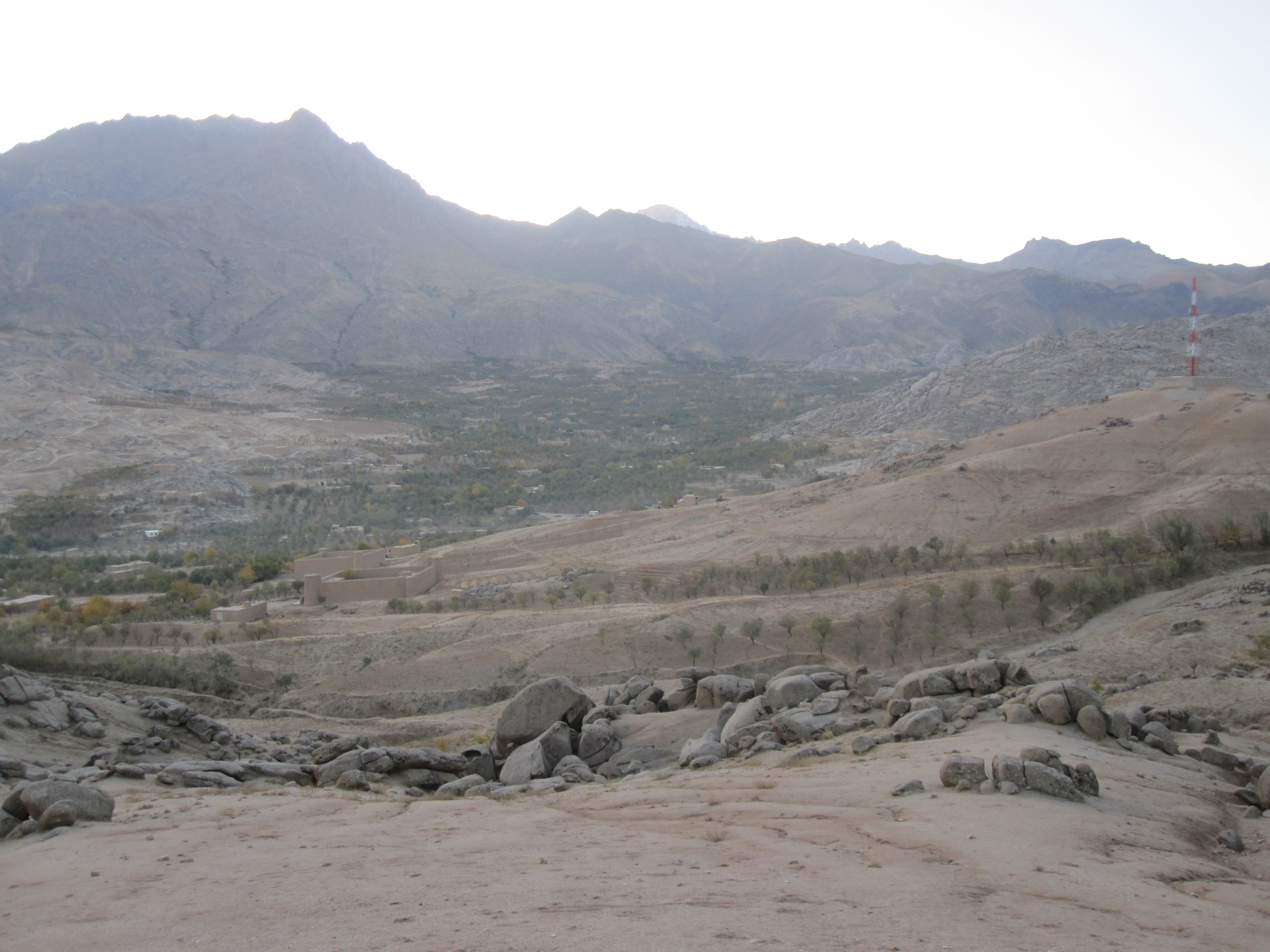
- A distant view of Nili in 2011

- Location within Afghanistan
- Coordinates: 33°43′N 66°7′E
- Country: Afghanistan
- Province: Daikundi
- District: Nili
- Established: March 2004
- Elevation: 2,022 m (6,634 ft)

Population (2025)
  - Total: 46,681
- Time zone: UTC+04:30 (Afghanistan Time)

Nili (Dari (Note: Dari pronunciation: [niː.líː]): نیلی, Pashto (Note: Pashto pronunciation: [ni.li]): نيلي) is a city in central Afghanistan, serving as the capital of Daikundi Province since 2004. It is connected by a road network with Bamyan in neighboring Bamyan Province to the northeast and Tarinkot in Uruzgan Province to the south.

Nili has a total land area of 9,022 ha (22,290 acres), and an estimated population of around 46,681 people. Although the majority are Hazaras, members of other neighboring ethnic groups are also in the city.

The city, which has over 2,000 houses and businesses, is within the Nili District and the Hazarajat region. It sits at 2,022 m (6,634 ft) above sea level. The Nili Airport is located a few miles away from the town center known as Gul-e-Badam Square (Almond Blossom Square).

Nili is an urban village in central Afghanistan in which the majority of the land is not built-up. Barren land is the largest land use and account for 79% of total land area. There are only 239 hectares of built-up land use, of which 35% is residential and 40% is vacant plots.

== History ==
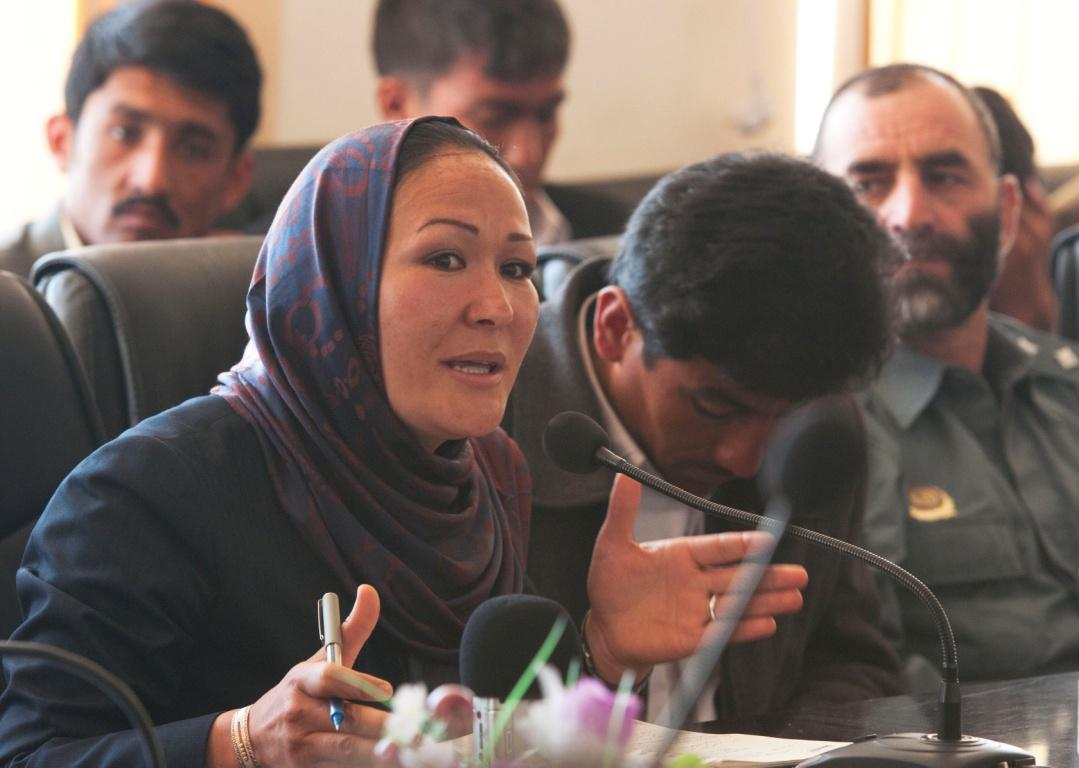
Azra Jafari, former mayor of Nili and the first female mayor in Afghanistan (April 15, 2012)

Nili became the capital of Daikundi Province in March 2004. Prior to that, it was an ordinary town within the pre-2004 larger Uruzgan Province. Due to its geographical inaccessibility and harsh winter, it was not until April 2007 that the United Nations opened a UNAMA office.

In December 2008, then-President Hamid Karzai selected Azra Jafari as mayor of Nili, which made her Afghanistan's first female mayor.

On 14 August 2021, Nili was seized by Taliban forces, becoming the twenty-fourth provincial capital to be captured by them as part of the wider 2021 Taliban offensive.

== Climate ==
Nili has a hot-summer humid continental climate (Dsa) in the Köppen climate classification, with dry summers and cold, snowy winters. Precipitation mostly falls in spring and winter.

Climate data for Nili, Daikundi Province
Month	Jan	Feb	Mar	Apr	May	Jun	Jul	Aug	Sep	Oct	Nov	Dec	Year
Record high °C (°F)	15 (59)	16 (61)	22 (72)	26 (79)	32 (90)	37 (99)	39 (102)	37 (99)	34 (93)	28 (82)	24.0 (75.2)	16.5 (61.7)	39 (102)
Mean daily maximum °C (°F)	0 (32)	0 (32)	8.0 (46.4)	17 (63)	24 (75)	30 (86)	32 (90)	31 (88)	27 (81)	20 (68)	12 (54)	5 (41)	17.2 (63.0)
Mean daily minimum °C (°F)	−10.0 (14.0)	−8.0 (17.6)	−2.0 (28.4)	5 (41)	11 (52)	17 (63)	19 (66)	18 (64)	14 (57)	8 (46)	1.0 (33.8)	−6 (21)	5.6 (42.0)
Record low °C (°F)	−19.0 (−2.2)	−16.0 (3.2)	−10.0 (14.0)	−2 (28)	4.0 (39.2)	7.0 (44.6)	8.0 (46.4)	6.0 (42.8)	−1.0 (30.2)	−2.0 (28.4)	−7.0 (19.4)	−14.0 (6.8)	−19.0 (−2.2)
Average precipitation mm (inches)	67 (2.6)	87 (3.4)	95.0 (3.74)	53 (2.1)	17.0 (0.67)	2.0 (0.08)	1.0 (0.04)	0.5 (0.02)	0.0 (0.0)	6.0 (0.24)	33.0 (1.30)	40 (1.6)	401.5 (15.79)
Average precipitation days (≥ 1.0 mm)	10	12	13	13	8	1.0	0.5	0.5	0.1	2	7	7.6	74.7
Average snowy days	10	10	6	0	0.0	0.0	0.0	0.0	0.0	0.0	2	6	34
Source 1: meteoblue
Source 2: meteoblue

Climate data for Nili, Daikundi Province
Month	Jan	Feb	Mar	Apr	May	Jun	Jul	Aug	Sep	Oct	Nov	Dec	Year
Mean daily maximum °C (°F)	−1.7 (28.9)	0.0 (32.0)	6.1 (43.0)	15.6 (60.1)	21.7 (71.1)	27.8 (82.0)	31.1 (88.0)	30.0 (86.0)	26.1 (79.0)	18.9 (66.0)	9.4 (48.9)	3.3 (37.9)	15.7 (60.2)
Daily mean °C (°F)	−6.9 (19.6)	−4.7 (23.5)	1.4 (34.5)	9.8 (49.6)	15.6 (60.1)	21.4 (70.5)	24.7 (76.5)	23.4 (74.1)	19.2 (66.6)	12.5 (54.5)	3.9 (39.0)	−2.5 (27.5)	9.8 (49.7)
Mean daily minimum °C (°F)	−12.2 (10.0)	−9.4 (15.1)	−3.3 (26.1)	3.9 (39.0)	9.4 (48.9)	15.0 (59.0)	18.3 (64.9)	16.7 (62.1)	12.2 (54.0)	6.1 (43.0)	−1.7 (28.9)	−8.3 (17.1)	3.9 (39.0)
Average precipitation mm (inches)	62 (2.4)	105 (4.1)	102 (4.0)	72 (2.8)	37 (1.5)	1 (0.0)	1 (0.0)	0 (0)	0 (0)	2 (0.1)	46 (1.8)	25 (1.0)	453 (17.7)
Source: Nomadseason

== Economy ==
The main source of income of Nili residents is agriculture, trade, transport, tourism, and remittance. The area is famous for growing almonds. The Sukhtok Dam is located a few miles to the east of the city.

== Sport ==
Association football and cricket are the most popular sports in the area. The Nili Football Stadium is located near Nili Airport.

== See also ==
- List of cities in Afghanistan
- Valleys of Afghanistan
