= Sangi Takht District =

Sang-e-Takht سنگ تخت
- District
- Location within Afghanistan
- Coordinates: 34°11′24″N 65°54′36″E
- Country: Afghanistan
- Province: Daykundi
- Elevation: 2,450 m (8,040 ft)

Sangi Takht or Sang‐e‐Takht (Dari: سنگ تخت), is a district in Daykundi Province in central Afghanistan. It was created in 2005 from Daykundi district.

The Sangtakht-Bandar District has 290 villages. It has an area of 1,095 square kilometres (423 sq mi) and a population of 78,900. This district is limited by the Ghor Province and the Ashtarlay District of Daikundi.

The people of Sangtakht-Bandar District are typically farmers. This district lacks an asphalt road and its government office does not have the building.

A few villages in the district are Santakht, Bandar, Seyahchob, and Dorob.
