= Khadir District =

Khadir خدیر
- District
- Location within Afghanistan
- Coordinates: 33°54′00″N 65°45′00″E
- Country: Afghanistan
- Province: Daykundi Province
- Elevation: 1,900 m (6,200 ft)

Khadir or Khedir (Dari: خدیر), is a district in Daykundi province, Afghanistan. It was created in 2005 from Daykundi district of the old Uruzgan province. Its capital Khadir is situated at 2,466 m elevation.
