= Zahra Mahmoodi =

Afghan footballer

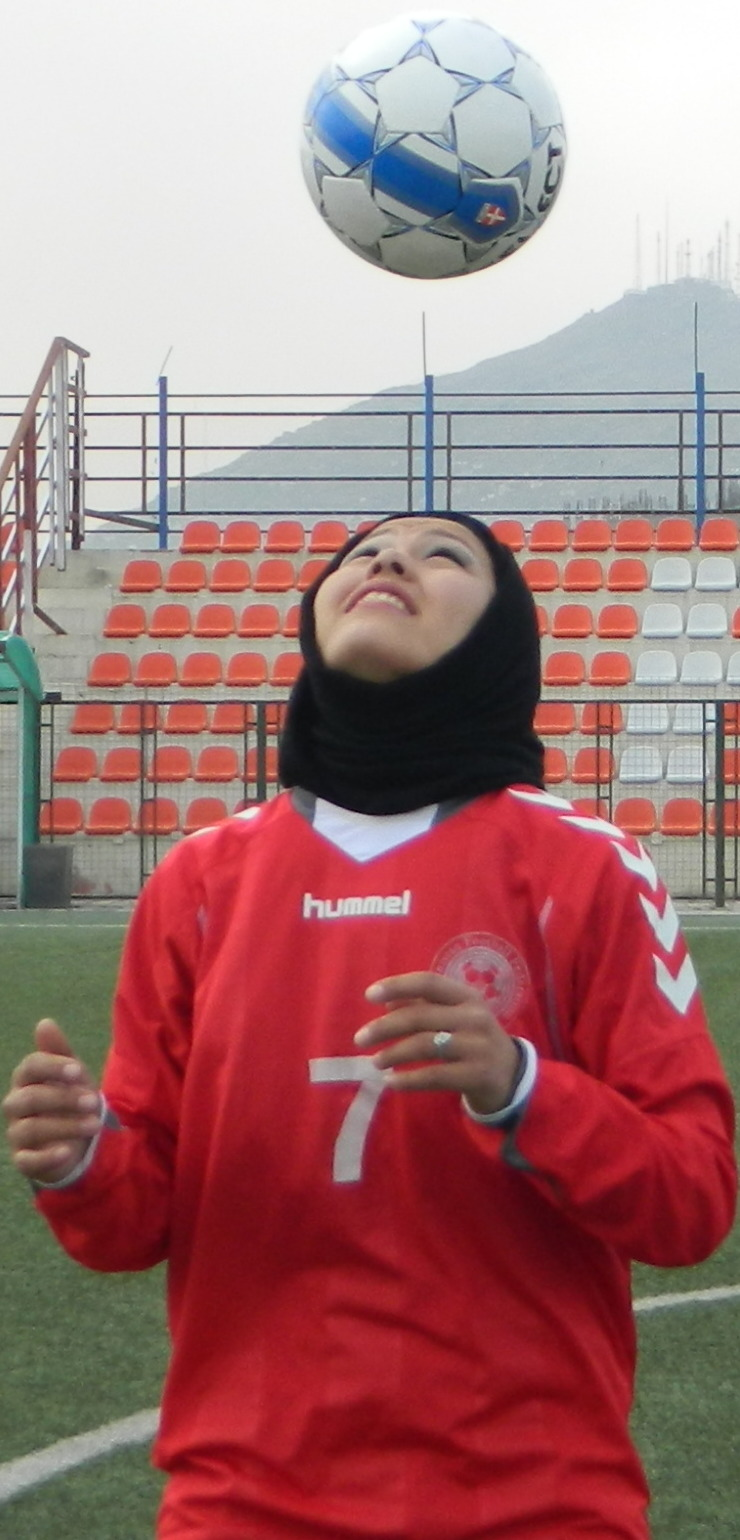

Personal information
- Born: 1990 (age 35–36) Iran

Sport
- Sport: Association football

Zahra Mahmoodi (born 1990) is the former captain of the Afghanistan Women's National Football player. She was a founding member of the Afghanistan women's national football team when it was first established in 2007 and remained a member until late 2013.

== Early life ==
Mahmoodi was born in 1990 near Tehran, Iran, the child of Hazara refugees who had fled persecution in Afghanistan in 1975. In 2000, when she was nine, she organised a girls' football club at her school, but this was shut down by the school administration. Shortly afterwards, her father set up a small workshop manufacturing footballs; Mahmoodi worked in the shop during the day and practised in the evenings in secret. In 2004 the Iranian government banned Afghan refugees from attending school, and the family decided to return to Afghanistan. There, Mahmoodi began organising informal women's football competitions in Kabul.

== Career ==
In 2007, Mahmoodi was recruited by the Afghanistan Football Federation to be part of the first Afghanistan women's national football team. She became the team captain in 2010, leading the team at the South Asian Football Federation women's championship in 2010 - the first time that an Afghan team had competed. The team returned under her leadership in 2012. Mahmoodi also played for different clubs in Kabul city including the Payam Club (2007–2010), the Kabul Club (2010–2012) and the Rabi Balkhi Club (2012–2013). Mahmoodi was the first female football coach in Afghanistan, having been issued an AFC "C" coaching license in 2011. She founded and coached the Afghanistan Under-14 girls team and served as Head of the Women's Committee of the Afghanistan Football Federation.

In 2013, Zahra Mahmoodi received a Humanitarian Award from Muhammad Ali in Louisville, Kentucky, the "Spirituality" Principle Award, which was given to Mahmoodi for her efforts in promoting women's rights in Afghanistan through sports. As a result of threats from the Taliban, she did not return to Afghanistan, but applied for asylum in Canada and settled in Toronto.

In Toronto, Mahmood works as an athlete ambassador for Right to Play, an organisation which seeks to build communities through sport. In June 2019 Mahmoodi graduated from the University of Guelph with a bachelor's in International Development and was awarded the 2019 International Development Studies prize, representing the Economic and Business Development area of emphasis.
