= Gizab District =

Gizab گیزاب
- District
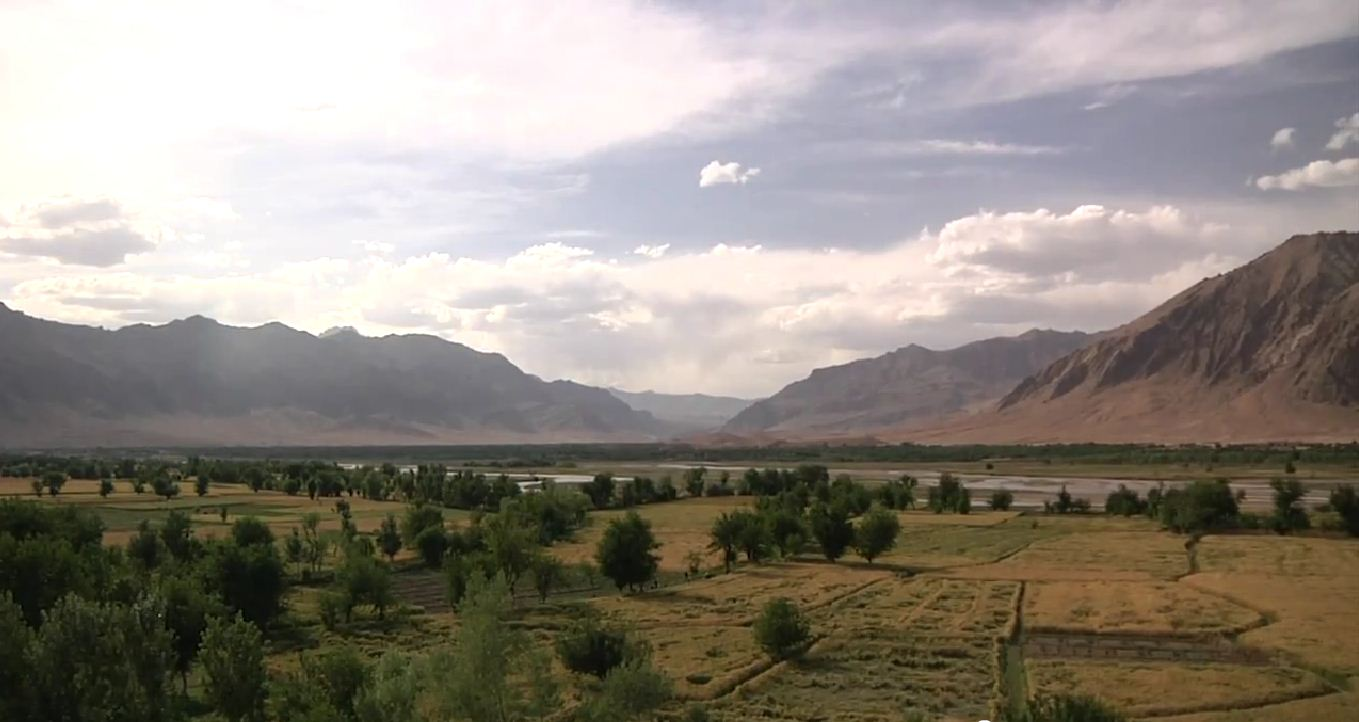
- A view of a valley in the Gizab District

- Location within Afghanistan
- Coordinates: 33°24′00″N 66°16′12″E
- Country: Afghanistan
- Province: Daykundi
- Elevation: 1,350 m (4,430 ft)

Gizab (Dari: گیزاب) also spelled as Gezab and Gizu, is a district in the Daykundi Province of Afghanistan. It has a population of about 75,503 and includes Hazara and Pashtun ethnic groups. The main town Gizab is at 1364 m altitude along the Helmand River.

== History ==
=== Background ===
Gizab was transferred in 2004 from Uruzgan Province to Daykundi Province, and then re-annexed to Uruzgan Province in 2006. Later, it was transferred back to Daykundi Province.

Before the revolt, there had been sporadic reports of violence in the area. On 24 November 2009, it was reported that six Taliban fighters, including Mullah Khairullah, the Taliban district chief, were killed when going from Gizab District to the Charchino area.

The Taliban had maintained a presence in the Gizab area since late 2007 as it is a strategic crossroads for insurgents coming from Pakistan and traveling to the contested provinces of Kandahar and Helmand. Initially, they were welcomed by the residents and many young men from the town were eager to join their ranks as soldiers-for-hire. However, according to Lalay, a local shopkeeper and chief, the Taliban had become increasingly oppressive and desperate for money. "They would frequently stop trucks on the road, either to steal cargo or to levy taxes." These actions began to spread discontent and anger amongst the local residents which came to a head when the local Taliban commander demanded Lalay hand over $24,000 that had been given to the town by the Afghan government as compensation for family members killed by Taliban violence. Lalay refused and later told the press, "We had enough of their oppression, so we decided to fight back." The citizens decided to side with the American forces in the area who had been funding local development projects and providing much-needed employment.

During a 2007 press conference, Mohammed Hashim Watanwal, a Wolesi Jirga representative, asserted that anti-government elements controlled all of Gizab district.

Through 2008, Gizab had no government representatives, either from the national, provincial, or district levels; nor from the international community or NATO's International Security Assistance Force, represented in the area by the Dutch Task Force Uruzgan. Instead, Gizab was governed by a combination of the Taliban and clan-level chieftains operating with traditional tribal codes until the 2010 April revolt. There has since been a sustained uprising against the Taliban presence.

=== 2010 April revolt ===
In late April 2010, many citizens of Gizab, headed by Lalay and other elders of the village, revolted against the Taliban presence in the area. After a 2 a.m. meeting of the town elders, the angered citizens formed roadblocks and began to capture insurgents. This initial action began a full-scale revolt which attracted the attention of hundreds of additional young men from the village who armed themselves and began an hours-long firefight with the Taliban insurgents remaining in the area. The group sent a request for assistance to the nearest U.S. Special Forces detachment, but as a flooding river prevented them from arriving in time, a team of Australian Special Forces soldiers were sent in via helicopter.

Once on the ground, the allied soldiers gave the citizens pieces of reflective orange cloth to tie around their rifles to tell the difference between friend and enemy. After the firefight subsided, the surviving Taliban fled into the mountains and the 330-man group which participated in the revolt, dubbed the "Gizab Good-guys" by the Australian Special Forces, spread out and formed citizen-protection forces that continue to patrol the streets to protect the town from Taliban intrusion in the future. However, their efforts have been hampered by those of the Afghan government which has not provided any source of permanent funding to the group, nor deputized them as a police force.

This revolt led to several similar small-scale revolts in 14 other small villages in the neighboring areas, whose citizens also formed 10-man protective forces with the same long-term goal of avoiding Taliban contact in the future.

=== Military response ===
After the town had been cleared of Taliban fighters, the U.S. Special Forces detachment to the North moved their base of operations to Gizab and have begun to train the local residents and those of neighboring villages interested in fighting the Taliban.

However, this revolt has been seen by many as more than an isolated case of dissatisfaction, and has become a rallying point for many in the military who claim that the insurgency is finally weakening, even being called "perhaps the most important thing that has happened in southern Afghanistan this year" by an unnamed U.S. Commander. Brig. Gen. Austin S. Miller, the top U.S. Special Operations Commander in Afghanistan was quoted as saying, "The Taliban thought this place was untouchable, and what the people here showed them -- and everyone else -- was that they could stand up and break free from that grip."

Since the revolt, U.S. military commanders have been sorting through the pattern of events in Gizab in order to replicate them in many more villages angered by the Taliban presence. According to a State Department official, "We are looking for the patterns, if we can find them, we'll be on the verge of a breakthrough."

== See also ==
- Districts of Afghanistan
- Daykundi Province
