= Ishtarlay District =

Ishtarlay اشترلی
- District
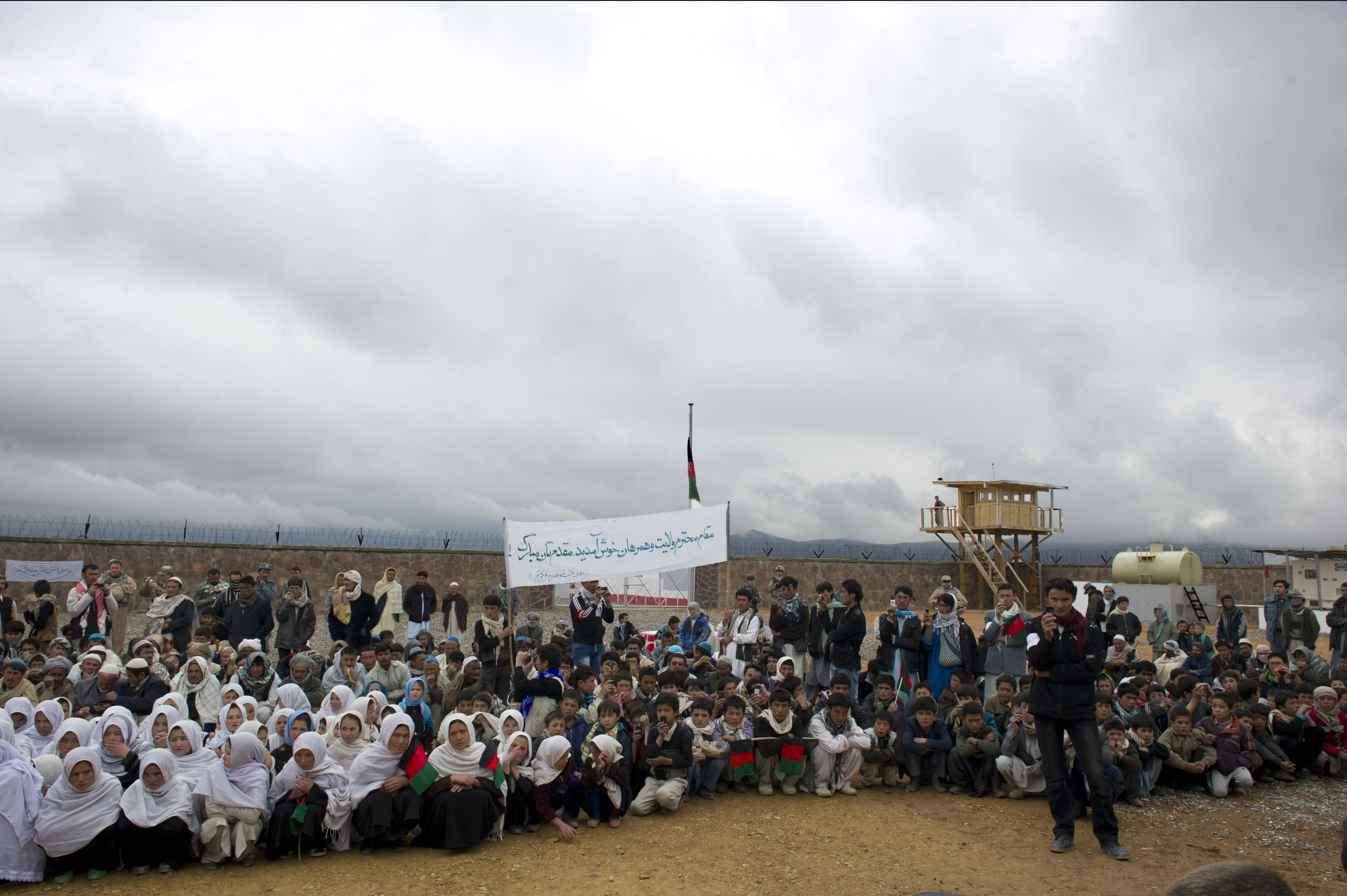
- Local residents at the opening ceremony of an Afghan National Police (ANP) district headquarters in Ashtarlai district.

- Location within Afghanistan
- Coordinates: 34°06′00″N 66°19′00″E
- Country: Afghanistan
- Province: Daykundi
- Elevation: 2,600 m (8,500 ft)

Ishtarlay or Ashtarlay (Dari/Hazaragi: اشترلی), is a district in the Daykundi Province of Afghanistan, located in the isolated central part of the country. It was created in 2005 from Daykundi district.

== Demographics ==
The population of Ashtarlay is made up of ethnic Hazaras.

== See also ==
- Districts of Afghanistan
- Hazarajat
