= Kajran District =

Kajran کجران
- District
- Location within Afghanistan
- Coordinates: 33°12′36″N 65°37′12″E
- Country: Afghanistan
- Province: Daykundi

Area
  - Total: 1,886 km^{2} (728 sq mi)
- Elevation: 1,400 m (4,600 ft)

Population (2004)
  - Total: 26,259

Kijran, also spelled as Kajran (Dari: کجران), is a district in Daykundi province in central Afghanistan. It has an area of about 1,886 square kilometres.

== Demographics ==
The population of the district was reported in 2004 at about 26,259 people.

== Gallery ==
Additional images of Kajran District available in Wikimedia Commons.

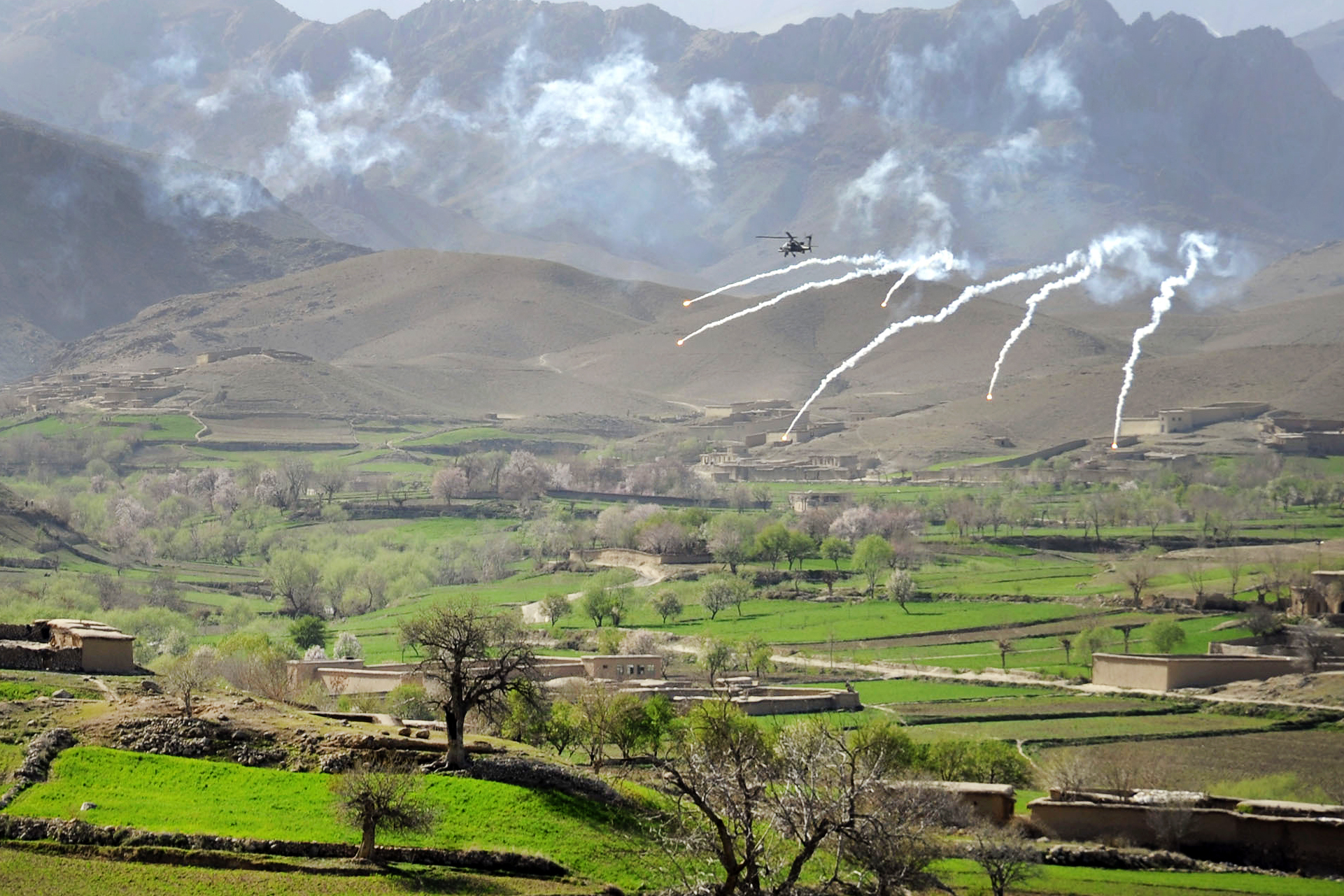
An AH-64 Apache helicopter shoots flares over a valley to support members of the 8th Commando Kandak and coalition special operations forces during a firefight near Nawa Garay village, Kajran district, Daykundi Province, Afghanistan.

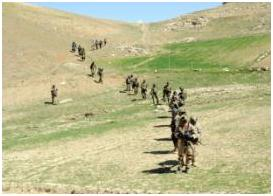
Members of the 8th Commando Kandak and coalition Special Operations Forces patrol though a valley near Nawa Garay village, Kajran district, 2012.

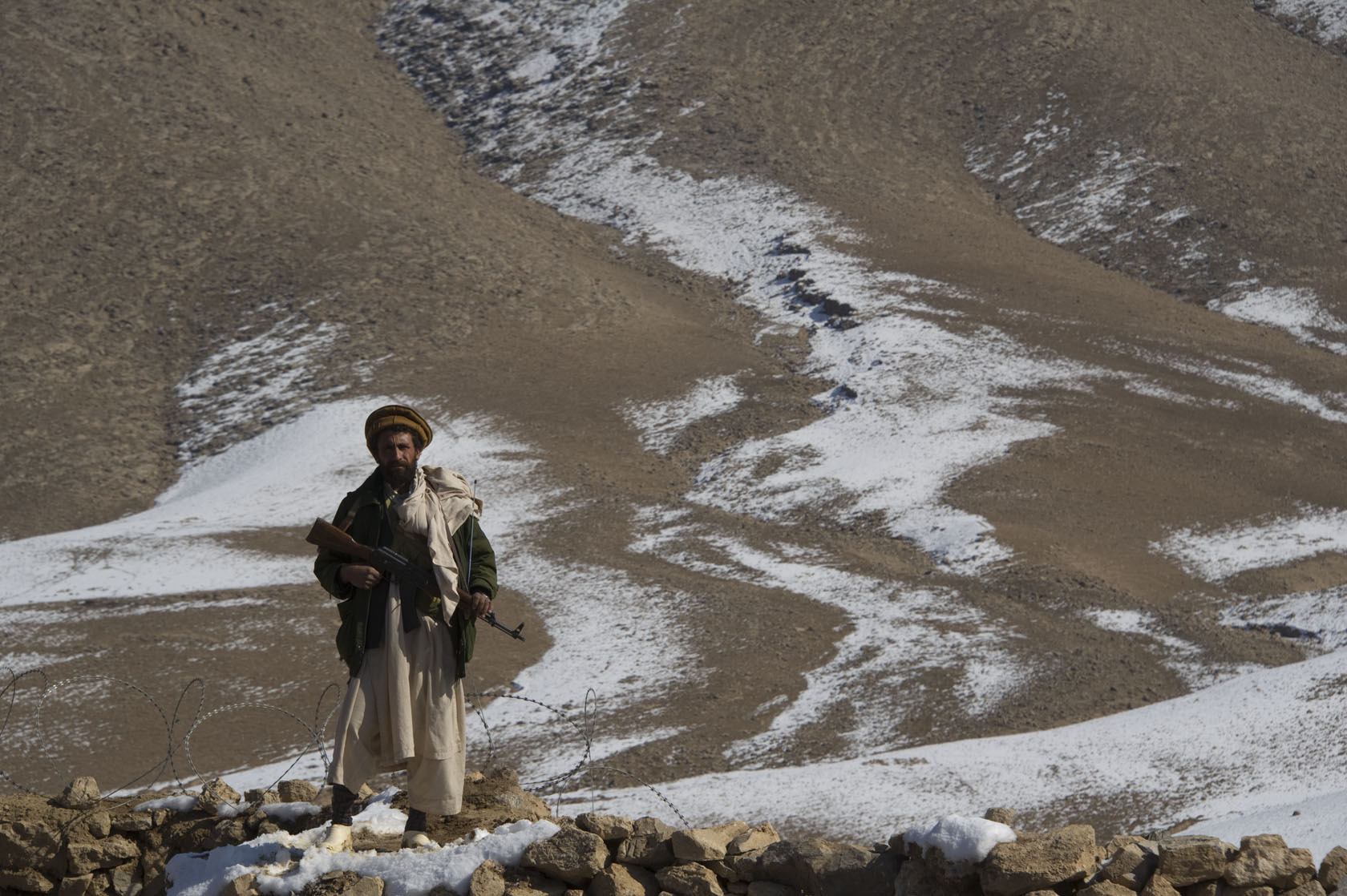
An Afghan Local Police officer patrols a checkpoint in Kajran district, 2012.

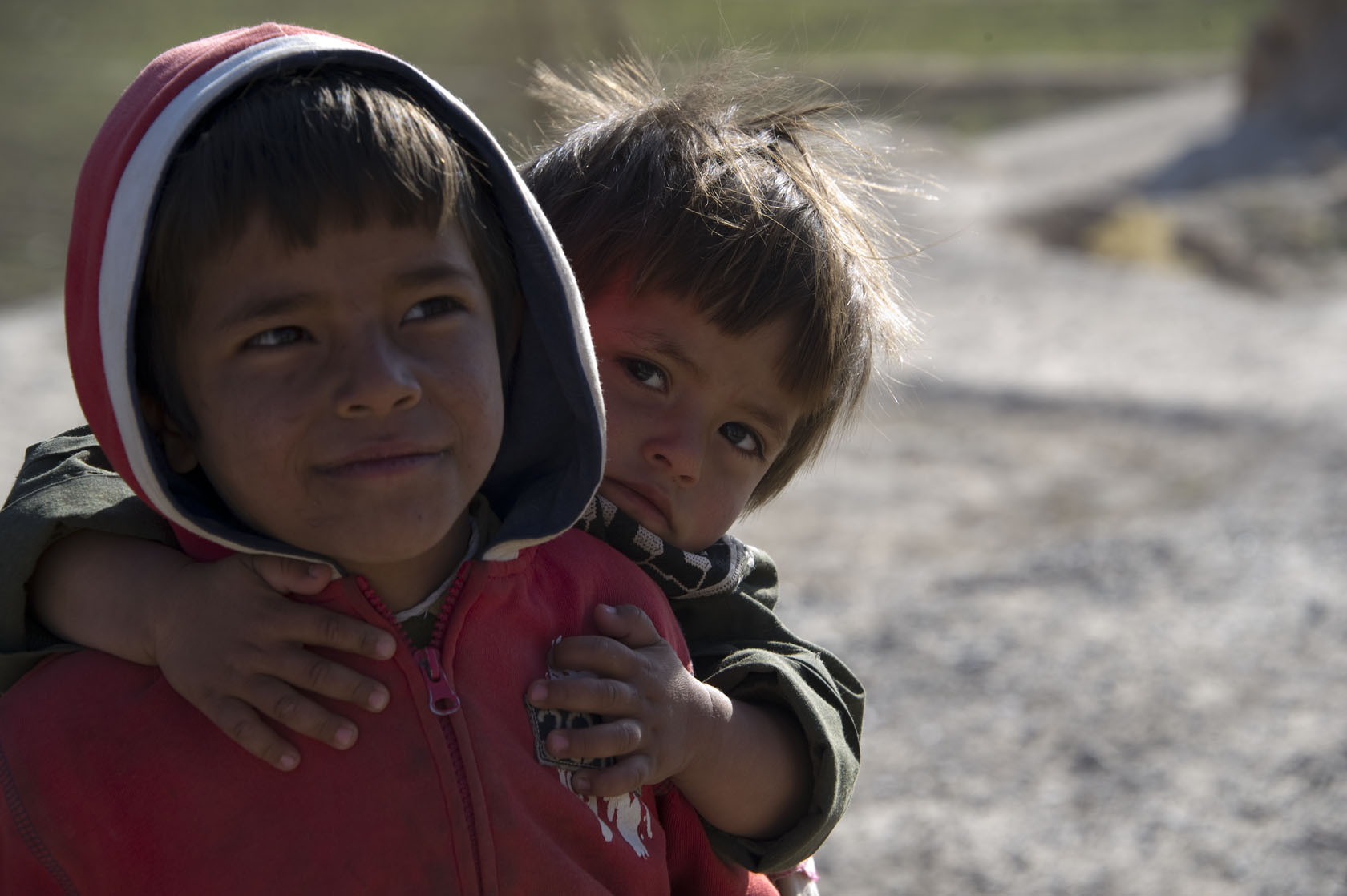
A pair of children gather outside a coordination meeting with village elders in Kajran district, 2011.

== See also ==
- Districts of Afghanistan
