= Shahristan District =

Sharistan شارستان
- District
- Location within Afghanistan
- Coordinates: 33°42′36″N 66°28′12″E
- Country: Afghanistan
- Province: Daykundi
- Elevation: 2,300 m (7,500 ft)

Shahristan (Dari/Hazaragi: شهرستان), or Sharistan (شارستان), is a district in Daykundi province in central Afghanistan. Daykundi var established as a province in the distant north area in Uruzgan province in 2004,

== Demographics ==
The ethnic Hazara people make up the majority of the total population of the district. All the inhabitants follow Islam.

== Geography ==
Sharistan is located north of the Taliban-controlled Uruzgan province, and shares a very long border with Gizab district, the previous Daykundi district that was re-annexed to Uruzgan in 2006. It also in north borders with Bamyan province. Basically Shahristan is an area containing districts, as; Meramor and Shahristan. After establishment of Daikundi Province Aulqan district was called by the name of Shahristan district this district does not cover all areas belonging to Shahristan. For example, Meramor district is part of Shahristan area but a separate district containing large areas such as; Aulia Meramor (Up Meramor), Sufla Meramor (Down Meramor), Gero, Bargar and Robad. Up Meramor includes Ghuchak, Deraw, Wojgenak, Tagab, Sadkhak, ESpok and Purgy Balla Villages. Down Meramor begins from Sarawod Village which is the interface between Up and Down Meramors, including Bagh, Beni, Arwas, Iskan, Chulung, Imed, Fulad, and Sangan Villages.
