= Daikundi Province =

Province of Afghanistan

Daikundi دایکندی
- Province
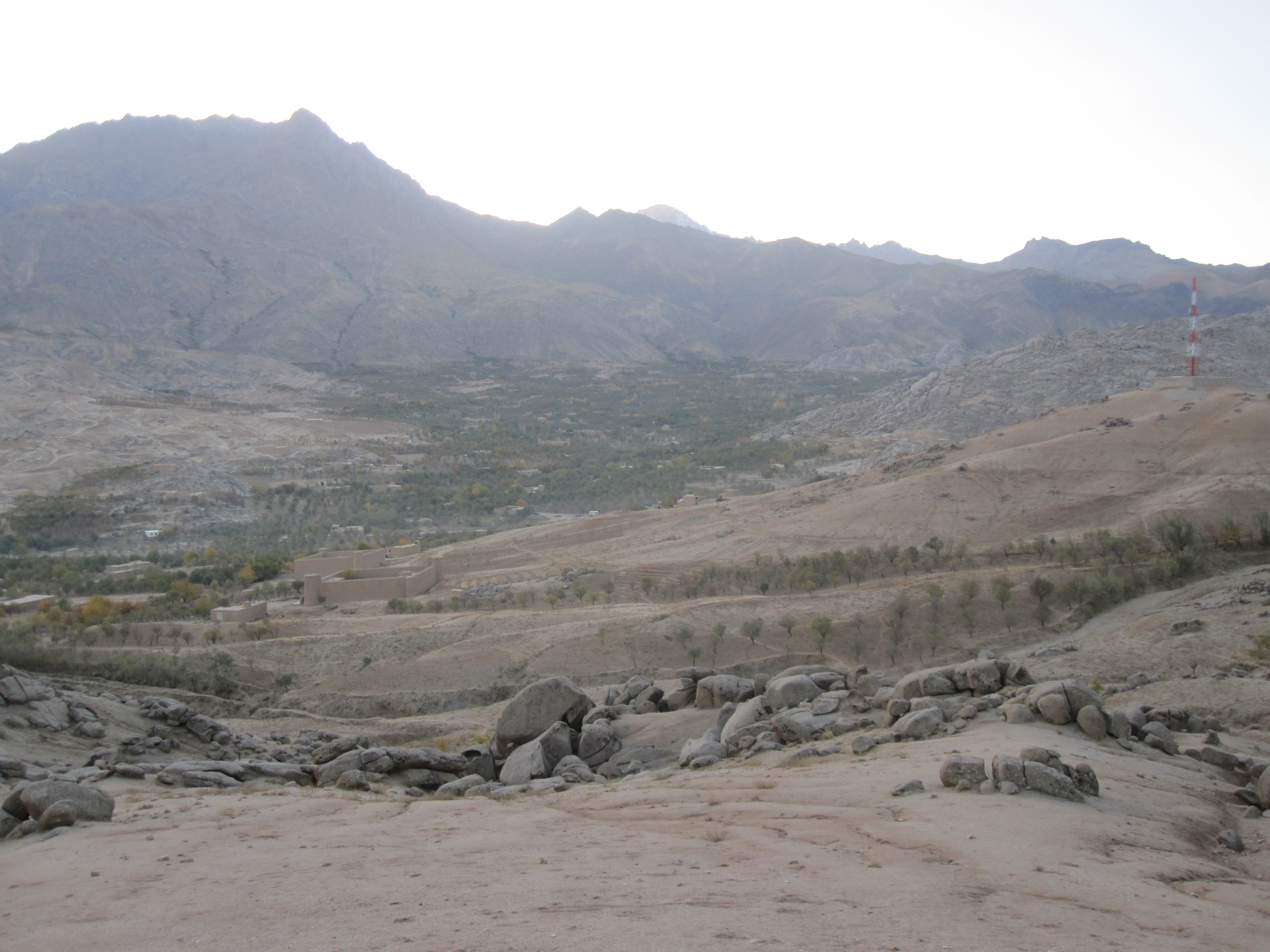
- The town of Nili, the provincial center of Daikundi

- Map of Afghanistan with Daikundi highlighted
- Coordinates: 33.75°N 66.25°E
- Country: Afghanistan
- Established: 2004
- Capital: Nili

Government
  - Governor: Mawlawi Tor Jan Ahmadi
  - Deputy Governor: Haji Sahib Rashid

Area
  - Total: 18,088 km^{2} (6,984 sq mi)

Population (2021)
  - Total: 525,529
- Time zone: UTC+04:30 (AFT)
- Postal code: 42XX
- ISO 3166 code: AF-DAY
- Main languages: Dari, Hazaragi

Daikundi (Note: Pashto: دايکندي, romanized: Dāikundī, pronounced [ˌd̪ɑɪkʊnd̪i]; Dari: دایکندی, romanized: Dāykundī, pronounced [ˌd̪ɑːjkʰʊnˈd̪iː]) is one of the 34 provinces of Afghanistan. It has a population of about 516,504, most of whom are peasants, traders, and shop owners.

Daikundi falls into the traditionally ethnic Hazara region known as the Hazarajat in the highlands of central Afghanistan with the provincial capital, Nili. It was carved out from the northern part of Uruzgan Province in 2004, becoming a separate province.

Daikundi is surrounded by Bamyan Province in the northeast, Ghazni Province in the southeast, Uruzgan Province in the south, Helmand Province in the southwest, and Ghor Province in the northwest.

== History ==
Daikundi was established on March 28, 2004, when it was created from the isolated Hazara-dominated northern districts of neighboring Uruzgan Province.

The province maintains its security through the Afghan police and military.

While the Government of Afghanistan, NGOs, the United Nations, and NATO's ISAF forces have had little involvement in reconstruction in the province, there have been some initiatives. Following heavy rainfall and flooding in February 2007 the United Nations Assistance Mission for Afghanistan (UNAMA) opened a sub-office in the province and Oxfam, one of the few NGOs operating in the province, described UNAMA's input into coordinating flood relief as impressive.

In November 2007 a World Food Programme convoy carrying mixed food aid was forced to abandon its mission due to security concerns and Afghanistan's Interior Ministry confirmed that Taliban insurgents had infiltrated the southern district of Kajran in a bid to destabilize the province. On 11 November 2007 Afghan forces launched a military operation to drive out the insurgents.

The United States began building new government institutions in the province. The insurgency problem and shortage of food continued until 2012. Several government officials have warned in October 2012 that "If the government or NGOs (non-governmental organizations) do not address the situation with proper assistance, Daikundi would witness many deaths this winter." In the meantime, a rebel leader along with his 150 fighters joined the government-initiated peace drive in Nili, capital of Daikundi province.

In July 2018, a bicycle competition was organized in the provincial stadium in Daikundi, between two teams of girls and boys. The bicycle competition was held to promote peace and harmony. There were ten girls and ten boys on each of the two teams, and medals, clothing, and other items were given to the winners.

== Geography ==
The province of Daikundi is located in central Afghanistan. The province is bordered on the south by Uruzgan, on the east by Ghazni and Bamiyan, on the north and west by Ghor, and the southeast by Helmand. Until March 2004, Dai Kundi was part of Uruzgan province. The Helmand River separates nearly 90% of the steep landscape.

=== Climate ===
Daikundi is the most vulnerable province to Climate Change in Afghanistan. The province experiences acute water shortages and droughts have poor soil quality, and risks of avalanches, landslides, and flooding, which cause extensive damage to agricultural land, infrastructure, and food security.

The impacts of climate change in Daikundi are manifold, mostly due to the limited institutional capacity to plan and respond to these impacts.

With support from the Global Environment Facility (GEF), United Nations Environment Programme (UNEP), and the National Environmental Protection Agency (NEPA) are cooperating on pilot field demonstrations in Daikundi province that aim to build environment adaptive and resilience of vulnerable villages to climate change impacts.

The above-mentioned organization also aims to build the capacity of local institutions to address climate change risk within the peri-urban extent of the rapidly developing Nili Town.

== Administrative divisions ==
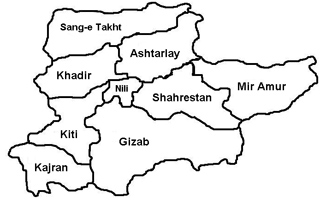
Current districts of Daikundi

Daikundi province has eight districts: Nili, Sangi Takht, Khadir, Ishtarlay, Miramor, Shahristan, Kajran, and Kiti.

Districts of Daikundi Province
District	Capital	Population	Area in km^{2}	Pop. density	Number of villages and ethnic groups
Ishtarlay		61,174	1,607	38	343 villages. Hazaras
Kijran		37,062	882	42	Baloch, Sadat
Khedir		53,434	1,744	31	294 villages. Hazaras
Kitti		56,436	1,004	56	196 villages. Hazaras
Miramor		86,024	2,208	39	326 villages. Hazaras
Nili	Nili	42,832	591	72	165 villages. Hazaras
Sangi Takht		59,043	1,711	35	Hazaras
Shahristan		80,740	1,916	42	290 villages. Hazaras
Daykundi		516,504	17,501	30	96.4% Hazaras (92.8% Shiites, 3.6% Sayyids), 3.6% Balochi.

== Economy ==
Agriculture is the main industry of the province. It is well known for its high-quality almonds, which are distributed throughout Afghanistan.

The dry weather of Daikundi and its uncertainty of precipitation make farmers concerned about their farm products. They are mostly relying on irrigated land, as they are afraid they do not lose their time, capital, and their labors.

As Daikundi does not have enough rainfall, there is a low capacity for wheat, orchard crops, beans, and vegetable production in cultivation; this makes the household members not have enough required food.

Daikundi people have less access to markets as there is a long distance from rural areas to local markets, poor road networks, snowstorms in the winter, and insecurity. However, people still sell their fruits and nuts to the traders at the farm gates, which get transported to the provincial center and regional markets.

Since the water for irrigation has decreased in Daikundi province, farmers are very concerned about their food production and pasture; even, this has affected farmland leasing. The farmers are not interested to contract lease lands as their crop production is lower and strongly relies on precipitation. Therefore, farmland leasing has decreased in Daikundi province.

The dry weather of Daikundi has not only affected farm production but also has negatively impacted livestock. The fodders and pastures are not enough and sufficient for the animals and they get common diseases like tuberculosis, PPR (Peste Des Petits Ruminants), sheeppox, foot-and-mouth diseases, etc. Even the dairy preservation is very poor in which milk and dairy are not sold in the market, except Kurut.

The only season that dairy products are consumed is during the spring season between April and June. The rest of the year, people in Daikundi do not have access to better nutrition status and try to import dairy products, like yogurt, from other provinces.

Taking care of fruit trees is the most important agricultural part of Daikundi. The most common fruits are almonds, mulberry, and walnuts. The districts of Shahristan, Miramor, and Ishtarlari are the main and major producers of these fruits.

Also, fruit tree plantations, which are mostly apples and almonds, have been increased and supported by NHLP, National Horticulture and Livestock Project.

The Market of Daikundi is pretty functional throughout the year but it has its struggles over the winter season as communications become difficult.

As a result of the above situation, the market and traders in the district centers make enough food stocks at their household level to ensure that there are enough stocks during the winter season.

== Demographics ==
=== Population ===
As of 2020, the total population of Daikundi is estimated to be around 516,504.

=== Ethnicity, languages and religion ===
Daikundi is mostly a rural tribal society. The ethnic Hazaras make up the majority of the total population of the province, who speak the Dari and Hazaragi, eastern varieties of Persian.

Estimated ethnolinguistic and -religious composition
Ethnicity	Hazara	Pashtun	Baloch	Sadat	Others	Sources
Period	Hazara	Pashtun	Baloch	Sadat	Others	Sources

2004–2021 (Islamic Republic)	86 – 90%	2 – 10%	1 – 5%	1 – 3%	∅
2020 EU	1st	2nd	3rd	4th	–
2018 UN	90%	2%	5%	3%	–
2015 NPS	86%	8.5%	3.5%	2%	–
2015 CSSF (Note: Demographic information is based on data from 2015.)	90% (Note: incl. Aimaq.)	10%	1%	1%	–
2011 PRT	86%	8.5%	3.5%	2%	∅ (Note: incl. Turkmen.)
2011 USA	86%	8.5%	3.5%	–	–

Legend:
- ∅: Ethnicity mentioned in source but not quantified
- –: Ethnicity not mentioned specifically
- Source abbreviations: Empirical sources: –, Government sources: EU – European Union Agency for Asylum, PRT – Provincial Reconstruction Team of the United States government, UN – United Nations Assistance Mission in Afghanistan, Editorial sources: CSSF – Center for the Scientific Study of Families, ISW – Institute for the Study of War, NPS – Naval Postgraduate School, USA – United States Army.

=== Health ===
The crude death rate was 0.42 (0.25–0.68) (95% CI) and the under-five death rate was 0.66 (0.29–1.51) respectively (95% CI). Both rates are below the SPHERE emergency levels.

== Culture ==
The first Gole Badam Festival was held in Daikundi 14 years ago. In 2010, the Hazara International Network recommended that this Festival be held to commemorate the blossoming of the almond tree.

Almonds are the province's principal agricultural commodity, and many households rely on them for livelihood.

The city's Almond Festival, an annual event hosted by the province government, drew nearly 4,000 people from across Daikundi to celebrate.

Almond cultivation is a major contributor to the Daikundi economy.

== Notable people ==
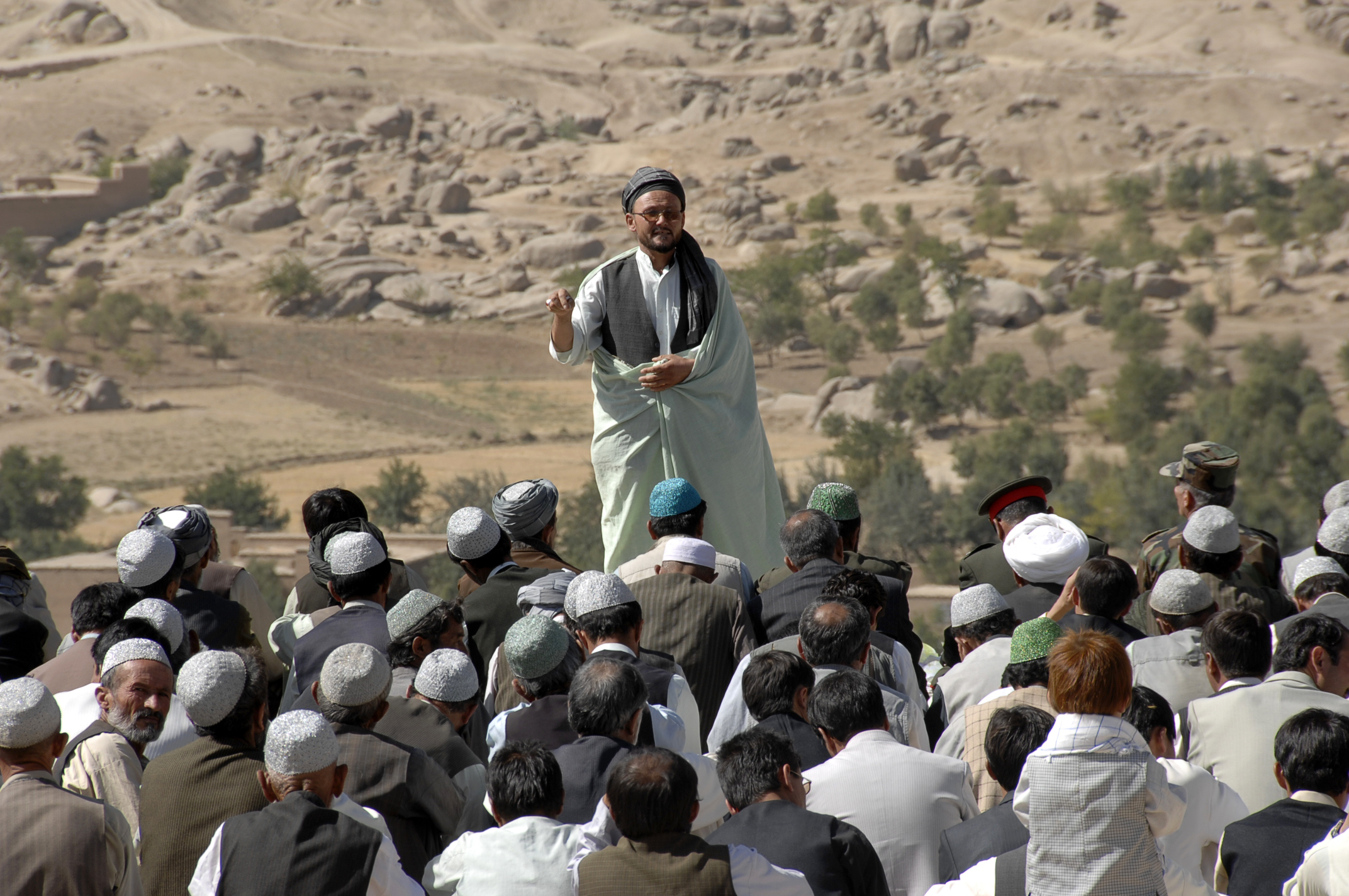
Eid al-Fitr in 2009

Daikundi has a lot of famous writers, researchers, artists, athletes, authors, and story writers, for example:

- Sarwar Danish, lawyer, and politician, who is the second vice president of Afghanistan.
- Sadiqi Zada Nili, a politician.
- Asadullah Saadati, a politician.
- Sarwar Sarkhosh, a singer.
- Dawood Sarkhosh, a singer.
- Hussain Sadiqi, an athlete who won in some competitions in the world.
- Shakardokht Jafari, a medical physicist who is an innovator based at the Surrey Technology Centre. She developed an efficient and low-cost method of measuring a medical dose of radiation.
- Fatema Akbari, an entrepreneur.
- Sahraa Karimi, a movie maker.
- Zahra Mahmoodi, a former captain of Afghanistan Women's National Football Team.

== See also ==
- Provinces of Afghanistan
- Daikundi (Hazara tribe)
