= Uruzgan Province =

Province of Afghanistan

Uruzgan اروزگان
- Province
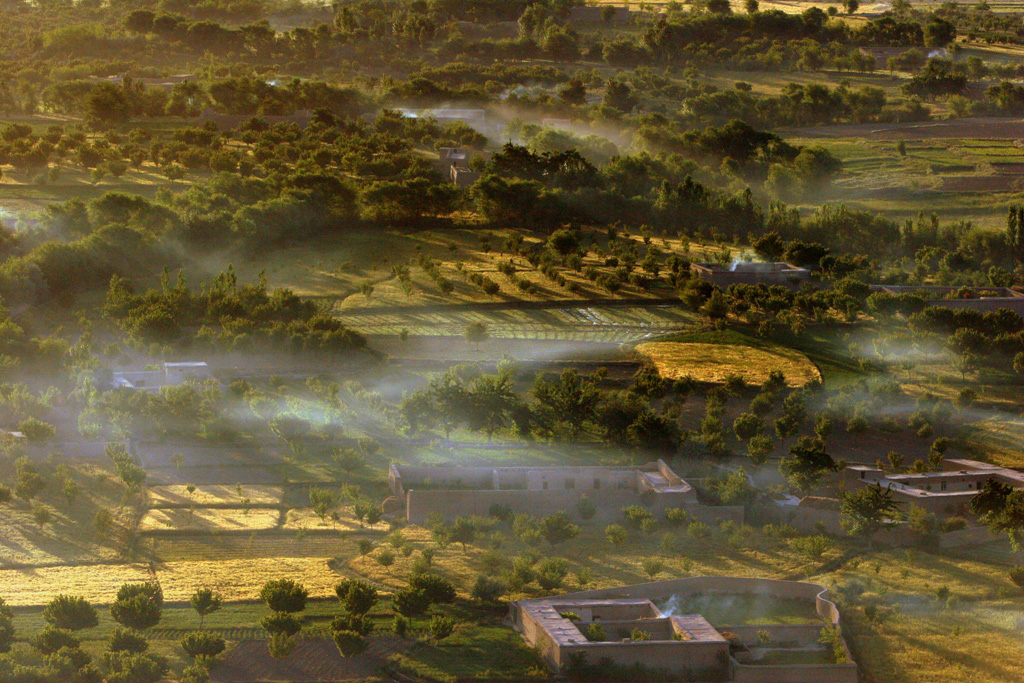
- Aerial photograph of fields in Uruzgan Province

- Map of Afghanistan with Uruzgan highlighted
- Coordinates (Capital): 32.8°N 66.0°E
- Country: Afghanistan
- Capital: Tarinkot

Government
  - Governor: Haji Dawat
  - Police Chief: Mullah Abdullah Bashir

Area
  - Total: 12,640 km^{2} (4,880 sq mi)

Population (2020)
  - Total: 436,079
- Time zone: UTC+4:30 (Afghanistan Time)
- Postal code: 41xx
- ISO 3166 code: AF-URU
- Main languages: Pashto and Dari

Uruzgan (Pashto (Note: Pashto pronunciation: [ˌʔʊɾuzˈgɑn]) and Dari: (Note: Dari pronunciation: [ˌʔʊɾuːzˈgɑːn]) اروزگان) is one of the 34 provinces of Afghanistan. It has a population of 436,079, and the province is mostly a tribal society. Tarinkot serves as the capital of the province. Uruzgan borders the provinces of Kandahar, Daykundi, Ghazni, Zabul, and Helmand.

== History ==
The Arabs were first to arrive in Uruzgan in the 7th century when they brought Islam to the region followed by the Saffarids who conquered the place in the 9th century. The region was part of ancient Arachosia, and was ruled by the Medes before it fell to the Achaemenids. In 330 BC, Alexander the Great occupied the area but left it to the Seleucids to rule. It was later attained and ruled by the Mauryas under Ashoka. By the 7th century, when the Arabs first arrived, it was under the control of the Zunbils before being conquered in the name of Islam by the Saffarids in the 9th century. It fell to the Ghaznavids followed by the Ghurids before the Mongol invasion in the 13th century. The area was ruled by Arghun Khan of Ilkhanate, later by the Timurids, Mughals and Safavids.

During the 1980's Soviet war in Afghanistan, Uruzgan witnessed fighting between pro-Soviet forces and the Mujahideen. One of the most prominent local Mujahideen leaders was Jan Mohammad Khan. In late 1994, Uruzgan was captured by the Taliban. They were toppled by US-led forces in late 2001. Hamid Karzai and his followers arrived in Uruzgan between October and November 2001 to take over control of the area.

=== Recent history ===
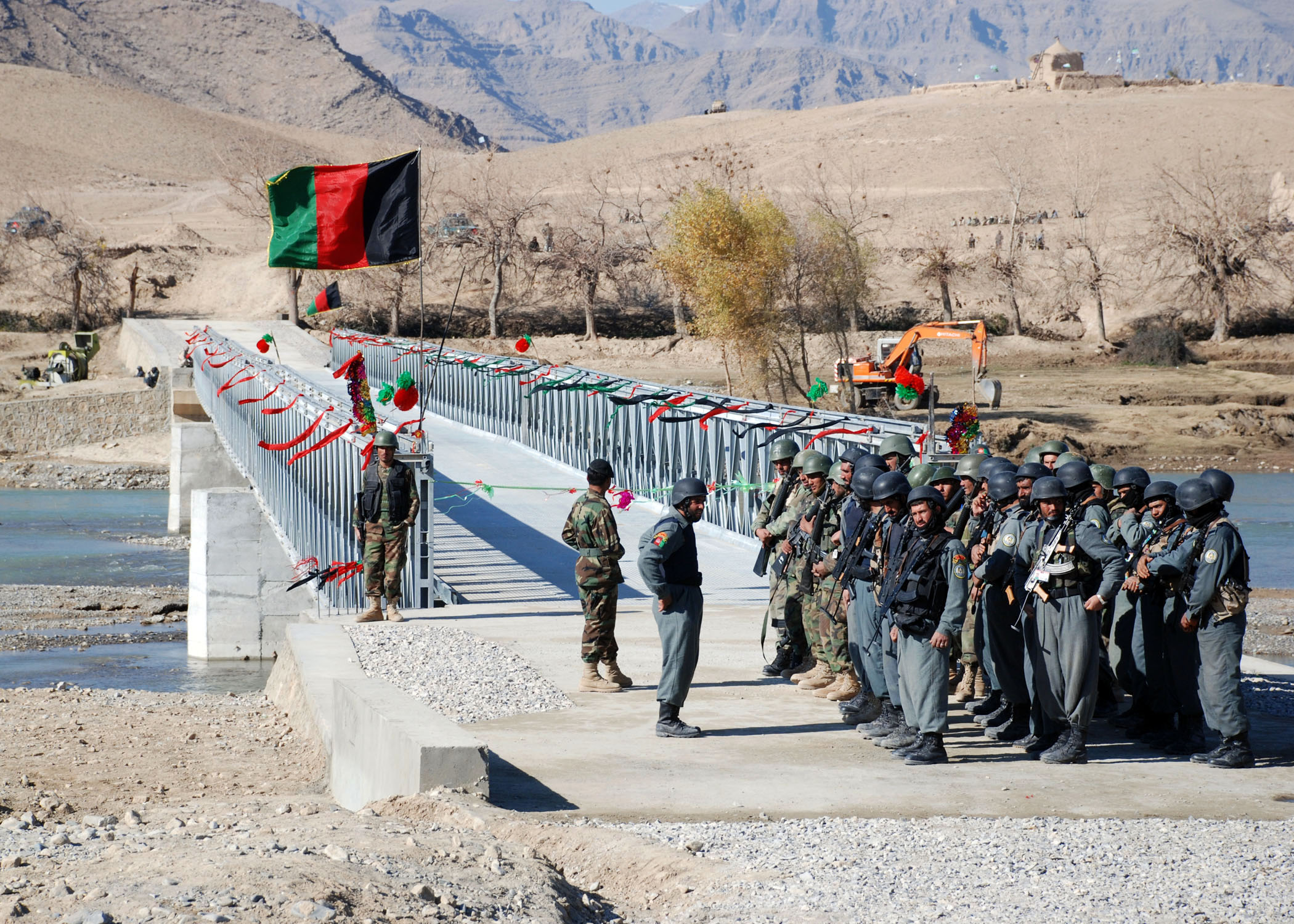
Afghan National Security Forces (ANSF) stand by near the Chutu Bridge during a grand opening ceremony for the bridge in December 2008.

In June 2002, a wedding party in Uruzgan was bombed by the U.S. Air Force, which resulted in the death of 30 civilians.

In 2004, the new Daykundi Province was carved out of an area of northern Uruzgan.

In August 2006, the NATO-led International Security Assistance Force (ISAF) assumed authority for Uruzgan from the US-led coalition, as the Netherlands took command of the Provincial Reconstruction Team (PRT) from the US as Task Force Uruzgan. There is also an Australian element under the Dutch command.

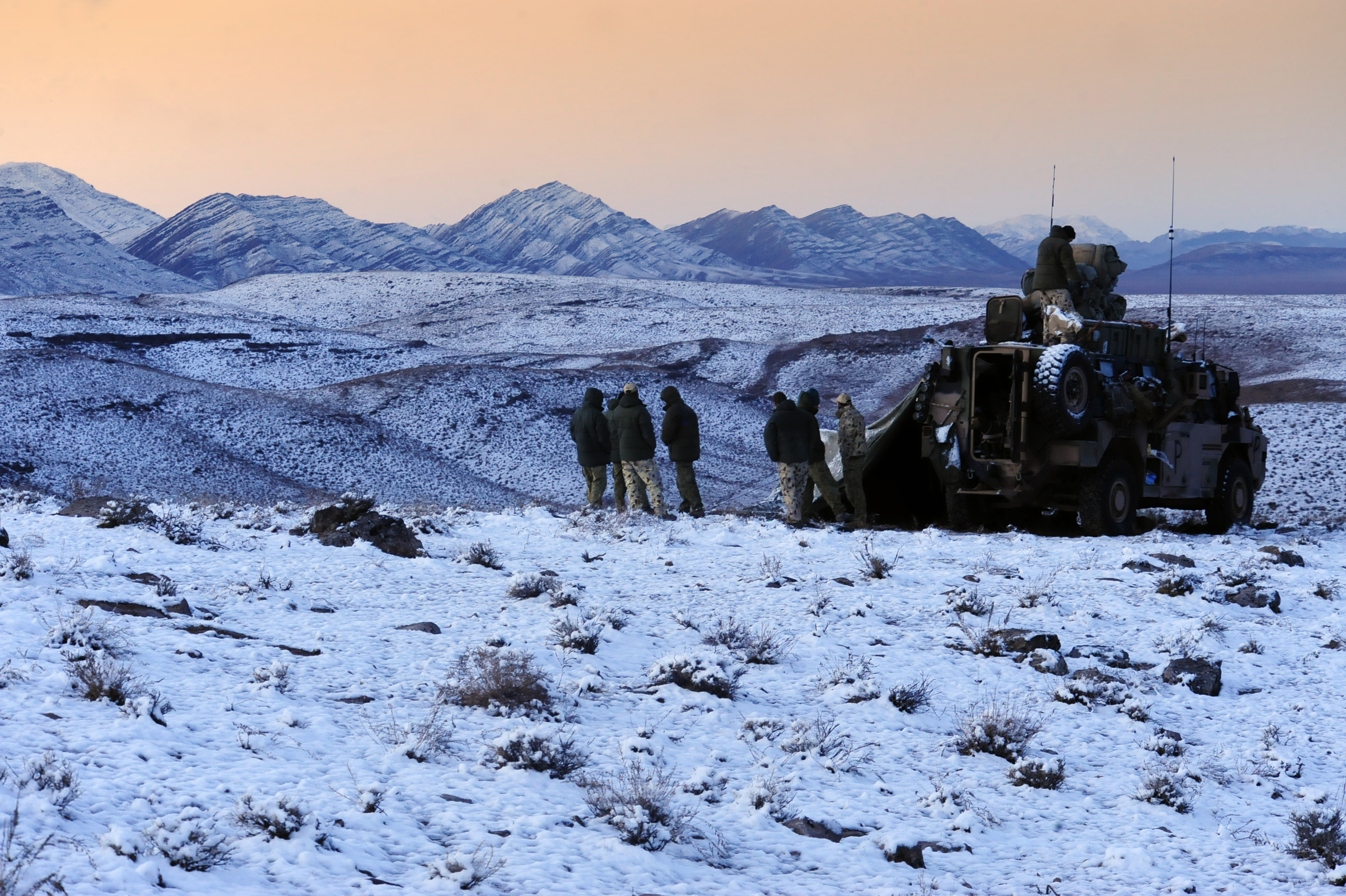
Soldiers from Australia's Special Operations Task Group (SOTG) in December 2009.

Because of security concerns and the Taliban insurgency, only one international aid agency (GIZ) has a permanent presence in Uruzgan. NATO's ISAF operates a PRT in Tarinkot. The 1,400 Dutch and 1,090 Australian troops in the area secured only the largest population centers in Uruzgan (Deh Rawood, Chora, and Tarinkot towns) under the Dutch "inkspot policy". However, the force's area of responsibility included the entire province. Gizab district, which was then the most dangerous of Uruzgan's district, had no ISAF presence before. In August 2010, the 1,950 Dutch forces withdrew their forces from Uruzgan province, after a political disagreement in the Dutch parliament, leaving the PRT to the US and Australia to continue the mission.

U.S. Army soldier watching Afghans pass during a logistics inspection in Tarinkot.

Uruzgan's opium poppy crop reached record levels in 2006 and 2007, according to the United Nations Office on Drugs and Crime (UNODC), as no significant eradication efforts were carried out by the Afghan administration or Dutch forces.

Between 15 and 19 June 2007, Dutch, American, Australian and Afghan soldiers defended the town of Chora against an assault by Taliban combatants. Reports in the Dutch, Australian and US press indicated that the battle was one of the largest Taliban offensives of the year. The fighting resulted in the deaths of a Dutch soldier, 1 Australian soldier, 1 American soldier, 16 Afghan policemen, an unknown number of civilians and a large number of Taliban.

In September 2008, Rozi Khan, the leader of Uruzgan's Pashtun Barakzai tribe, and a longtime rival of Popalzai leader Jan Mohammed Khan, was killed in a firefight in Chora District.

Gizab District was temporarily cleared of the Taliban by ISAF forces in late April 2010 and this was attributed to the uprising of the townspeople who helped the ISAF forces.

In February 2010, near Khod, over ten civilians in a three-vehicle convoy were killed by a combined force of a Lockheed AC-130, Bell OH-58 Kiowa helicopters and General Atomics MQ-1 Predator drones, who misidentified them as Taliban. The air forces were attempting to protect ground troops fighting several km away.

== Geography ==
Uruzgan province is located in southern Afghanistan, bordering Zabul and Kandahar to the south, Helmand to the southwest, Daykundi to the north, and Ghazni to the east. Uruzgan covers an area of 12,640 square kilometres (1,264,000 ha). Much of the province is mountainous or semi-mountainous terrain, while the rest of the area is made up of flat land.

== Administrative divisions ==
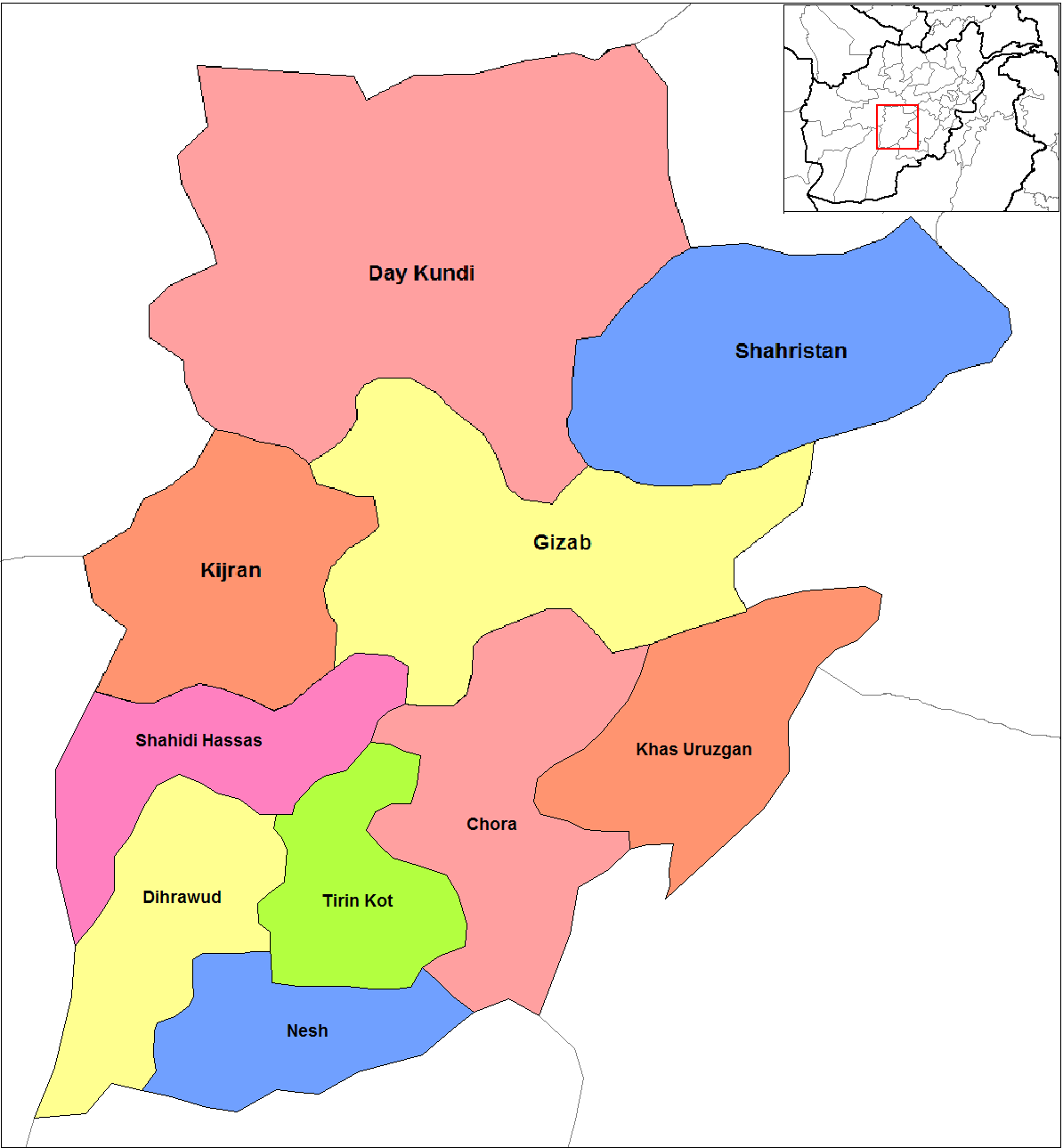
Map of the districts of Uruzgan as of January 2004, prior to the redrawing of provincial and district boundaries later that year. The northern districts (namely Daikundi, Shahristan, Kijran and parts of Gizab) became part of the newly created Daikundi Province later that year.

Districts of Uruzgan Province
District	Capital.	Population	Area	Pop. density	Notes
Shahidi Hassas		66,695	2,261	30	
Chora		72,276	2,189	33	
Deh Rawood		69,213	1,360	51	
Khas Uruzgan		63,904	2,821	23	
Tarinkot	Tarinkot	116,359	1,974	59	
Uruzgan		436,079	11,474	38	

== Economy ==
As of May 2014, the province was served by Tarinkot Airport which had regularly scheduled direct passenger service to Kabul.

== Demographics ==
=== Population ===
As of 2020, the total population of the province is about 436,079. The province has an estimated 45,000 households, each with about six members on average. Population figures are from the Ministry of Rural Rehabilitation and Development, the Central Statistics Office Afghanistan, and the Liaison Office study 2009.

=== Ethnicity, languages and religion ===
The population of Uruzgan is predominantly Pashtun at around 90%, largely as a result of historical population policies and the creation of the province of Daikundi in 2004, which separated most Hazara-majority areas. Nowadays, Hazaras remain a smaller minority mainly in northern districts, alongside groups such as Sayeds, Tajiks, and Quraishis. The exact ethnic composition remains somewhat contested, as province boundaries and administrative control of districts have repeatedly shifted between Daikundi and Uruzgan, making clear majorities difficult to define and occasionally, like in the case of Gizab, contributing to political tension. Pashto is the dominant language across most of the province, while Persian dialects spoken within Hazara and other communities. Sunni Islam is prevailing among Pashtuns and Shia Islam among Hazaras.

Estimated ethnolinguistic and -religious composition
Ethnicity	Pashtun	Persian-speaking people		Sources
Period	Pashtun	Hazara	non-Hazara	Sources

2004–2021 (Islamic Republic)	90 – 92%	8 – 10%	
2020 EU	1st	–	–
2018 UN	92%	8%	–
2015 NPS	∅ (Note: incl. Kuchi, Durrani (Alizai, Nurzai, Barakzai, Popalzai, Achakzai) and Ghilzai (Hotak).)	∅	–
2012 FIC	90%	–	–
2011 UCD	majority	–	–
2011 PRT	90% (Note: excl. Kuchi.)	10%	
2011 USA	90%	10%	
2010 CI	91%	8%	1% (Note: incl. Sayyid, Tajik and Quraish.)
2009 ISW	majority	significant minority	–

Legend:
- ∅: Ethnicity mentioned in source but not quantified
- –: Ethnicity not mentioned specifically
- Source abbreviations: Empirical sources: –, Government sources: EU – European Union Agency for Asylum, PRT – Provincial Reconstruction Team of the United States government, UN – United Nations Assistance Mission in Afghanistan, Editorial sources: CI – Clingendael Institute, FIC – Feinstein International Center, ISW – Institute for the Study of War, NPS – Naval Postgraduate School, UCD – University of California, Davis, (Note: Produced at UCD as part of the Regional Rural Economic Regeneration Strategies subproject of the eAfghan Ag project, supported by USAID.) USA – United States Army

=== Education ===
The overall literacy rate (6+ years of age) increased from 5% in 2005 to 17% in 2011. The overall net enrollment rate (6–13 years of age) increased from 1% in 2005 to 49% in 2011.

=== Health ===
The percentage of households with clean drinking water increased from 8% in 2005 to 27% in 2011. The percentage of births attended to by a skilled birth attendant increased from 6% in 2005 to 14% in 2011.

== See also ==
- Provinces of Afghanistan
