= Friendship Dam =

Friendship Dam may refer to:

- Afghanistan–India Friendship Dam
- Iran–Turkmenistan Friendship Dam
- Syria–Turkey Friendship Dam
