= Murghab =

Murghab (and various similar transliterations; Russian Мургаб) may refer to:

- Marghab District, a district in Ghor province
  - Murghab River, rising from the Marghab district and ending in Turkmenistan
  - Bala Murghab District, a district in Badghis Province, northwestern Afghanistan
- Murghab, Tajikistan, a town and district capital in Gorno-Badakhshan Autonomous Region, eastern Tajikistan
  - Murghob District, a district in Gorno-Badakhshan Autonomous Region, eastern Tajikistan
- Murgap, Turkmenistan, a town in and district capital in Mary Province, Turkmenistan
  - Murgap District, a district in Mary Province, Turkmenistan
- Bartang River, a river that rises in the Wakhan District of northeastern Afghanistan and flows into Tajikistan, which is known as "Murghab River" in its upper reaches
