= Dawlat Yar District =

Dawlat Yar دولت یار
- District
- Location within Afghanistan
- Coordinates: 34°35′N 65°45′E
- Country: Afghanistan
- Province: Ghor
- Center: Delak
- Elevation: 2,400 m (7,900 ft)

Population (2012)
  - Total: 31,800

Dawlat Yar is a district in Ghor Province, Afghanistan. It was created in 2005 from the southeastern part of Chaghcharan District. The administrative center of the district is Delak, but the largest town is Dawlat Yar (34.5519°N 65.7864°E) at 2503 m altitude.

The population of the district was estimated at 31,800 in 2012, and the electorate 23,767 in 2009. The district is mountainous, with extremely severe weather conditions during the winter causing roads to be blocked with snow for weeks. The majority of this district are Hazaras.
