= Kwajaha =

- City
- Location in Afghanistan
- Coordinates: 33°58′22″N 63°42′24″E
- Country: Afghanistan
- Province: Ghor
- District: Tulak
- Elevation: 7,582 ft (2,311 m)
- Time zone: UTC+4:30

Kwajaha is the district centre of Tulak District in Ghor province, Afghanistan, located at an altitude of about 2,311 m close to the village of Tulak, which gives the district its name.

== See also ==
- List of cities in Afghanistan
