= Qale-Zobayd =

- Location in Afghanistan
- Coordinates: 34°54′56″N 65°17′17″E
- Country: Afghanistan
- Province: Ghor
- District: Charsadda
- Elevation: 6,486 ft (1,977 m)
- Time zone: UTC+4:30

Qale Zobayd village is the center of Charsadda District, Ghor Province, Afghanistan. It is situated on 34.9156°N 65.2878°E at 1,977 m altitude.

== Climate ==
Qale-Zobayd features a warm-summer humid continental climate (Dsb) in the Köppen climate classification.

Climate data for Qale-Zobayd
Month	Jan	Feb	Mar	Apr	May	Jun	Jul	Aug	Sep	Oct	Nov	Dec	Year
Daily mean °C (°F)	−4.4 (24.1)	−3 (27)	2.1 (35.8)	7.4 (45.3)	12.5 (54.5)	18.0 (64.4)	20.6 (69.1)	19.2 (66.6)	14.1 (57.4)	7.7 (45.9)	1.3 (34.3)	−2.4 (27.7)	7.8 (46.0)
Average precipitation mm (inches)	48.4 (1.91)	83.3 (3.28)	93.6 (3.69)	77.1 (3.04)	45.7 (1.80)	2.2 (0.09)	0.1 (0.00)	0.4 (0.02)	0.3 (0.01)	13.4 (0.53)	45.5 (1.79)	23.6 (0.93)	433.6 (17.09)
Average relative humidity (%)	71	79	68	48	40	28	24	26	27	34	49	56	46
Source 1: ClimateCharts (1988-2017)
Source 2: World Weather Online (precipitation & humidity)

== See also ==
- Ghōr Province
