= Delak =

- Location in Afghanistan
- Coordinates: 34°24′N 65°55′E
- Country: Afghanistan
- Province: Ghor
- District: Dawlat Yar
- Elevation: 9,150 ft (2,789 m)
- Time zone: UTC+4:30

Delak (Dari: دلک) is the district center of Dawlat Yar district, Ghor province, Afghanistan. It has an elevation of 2,789 metres (9,150.3 ft).

== Climate ==
Delak has a humid continental climate (Köppen climate classification: Dsb) with warm, dry summers and cold, snowy winters.

Climate data for Delak, Ghor Province
Month	Jan	Feb	Mar	Apr	May	Jun	Jul	Aug	Sep	Oct	Nov	Dec	Year
Mean daily maximum °C (°F)	−6.1 (21.0)	−5.0 (23.0)	−0.6 (30.9)	7.8 (46.0)	14.4 (57.9)	18.9 (66.0)	22.2 (72.0)	21.1 (70.0)	17.8 (64.0)	10.6 (51.1)	2.2 (36.0)	−3.3 (26.1)	8.3 (47.0)
Daily mean °C (°F)	−12.5 (9.5)	−10.8 (12.6)	−5.3 (22.5)	3.9 (39.0)	10.2 (50.4)	14.1 (57.4)	16.9 (62.4)	15.5 (59.9)	11.9 (53.4)	5.6 (42.1)	−1.7 (28.9)	−8.6 (16.5)	3.3 (37.9)
Mean daily minimum °C (°F)	−18.9 (−2.0)	−16.7 (1.9)	−10.0 (14.0)	0.0 (32.0)	6.1 (43.0)	9.4 (48.9)	11.7 (53.1)	10.0 (50.0)	6.1 (43.0)	0.6 (33.1)	−5.6 (21.9)	−13.9 (7.0)	−1.8 (28.8)
Average precipitation mm (inches)	57.9 (2.28)	95.3 (3.75)	86.0 (3.39)	104.3 (4.11)	80.6 (3.17)	12.9 (0.51)	3.4 (0.13)	2.9 (0.11)	2.5 (0.10)	18.9 (0.74)	51.0 (2.01)	26.7 (1.05)	542.4 (21.35)
Average relative humidity (%)	76	83	82	58	43	30	26	27	25	32	55	65	50
Source: World Weather Online

== See also ==
- Ghōr Province
