= Sultan Ghiyassuddin Ghori Airport =

Sultan Ghiyassuddin Ghori Airport Dari: فرودگاه سلطان غیاث الدین غوری
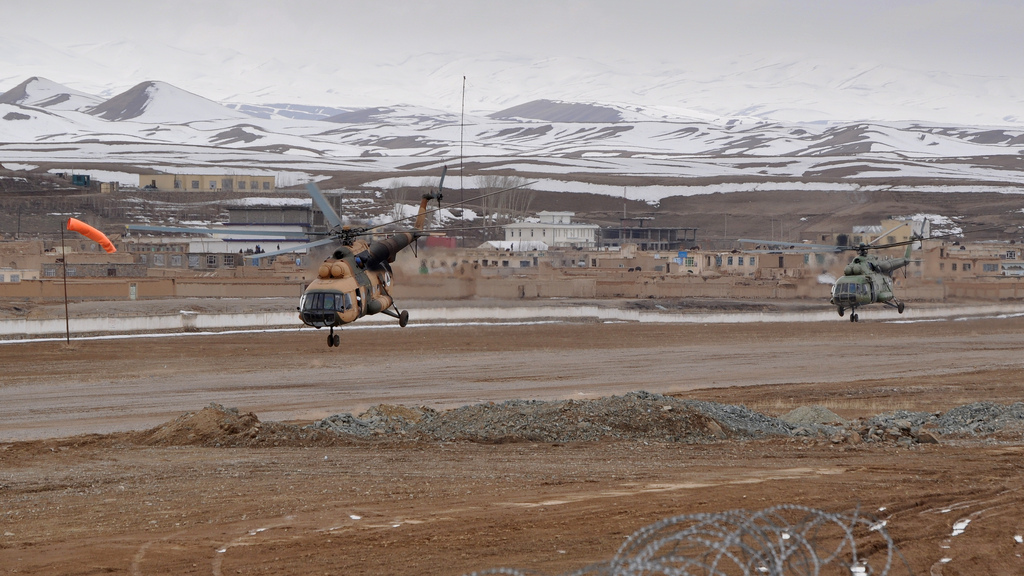
- Mil Mi-17s of the Afghan Air Force in 2010, a year before the runway was asphalted
- IATA: CCN; ICAO: OACC

Summary
- Airport type: Public
- Owner: Afghanistan
- Operator: Ministry of Transport and Civil Aviation
- Serves: Ghor Province
- Location: Firuzkoh, Afghanistan
- Elevation AMSL: 7,475 ft / 2,278 m
- Coordinates: 34°31′35″N 65°16′15″E

Map
- Location of airport in Afghanistan

Runways
Direction	Length		Surface
Direction	m	ft	Surface
06/24	2,001	6,565	Asphalt
- ISAF

The Sultan Ghiyassuddin Ghori Airport (Dari: فرودگاه سلطان غیاث الدین غوری; Pashto: د سلطان غیاث الدین غوري هوايي ډګر; IATA: CCN, ICAO: OACC), also known as Chaghcharan Airport or Shahid General Mohaiden Ghory Airport), is located in the eastern section of Firuzkoh, which is the capital of Ghor Province in central Afghanistan. It is a domestic airport under the country's Ministry of Transport and Civil Aviation.

Built at an elevation of approximately 7,475 ft (2,278 m) above sea level, the airport was recently named after Ghiyath al-Din Muhammad. It has one asphalt runway measuring 2,001 m (6,565 ft) long and 30 m (98 ft) wide. The Hari River runs south and east of the airport. The International Security Assistance Force (ISAF) and later the NATO Resolute Support Mission used the facility during the international security mission until late 2014.

== History ==
Work to rehabilitate Afghanistan's regional airfields, including Chaghcharan, was supported in the mid-2000s and early 2010s by the Asian Development Bank (ADB) under the Regional Airports Rehabilitation Project and the national transport sector plan. The runway was paved and basic airside/landside facilities were built; the airport's opening ceremony took place on 11 September 2011, attended by officials from the Provincial Reconstruction Team in Ghor. A Lithuanian Ministry of National Defence overview of the Ghor mission likewise notes the commissioning of a "new modern Chaghcharan airport runway" in 2011 with support from ADB, the Afghan Government and USAID.

== Facilities and infrastructure ==
The airport has a single asphalt runway (06/24) measuring 6,565 ft × 98 ft (2,001 m × 30 m) (approximately 2,001 m × 30 m (6,565 ft × 98 ft)). ISAF imagery from the 2011 opening shows a small terminal building, a control tower and a fire station adjacent to the apron. Operational publications used by business aviation list the field as joint civil/military, with VFR procedures only, no runway lighting and no jet fuel available; the airport is not an airport of entry.

== Operations ==
Regular scheduled commercial service to Chaghcharan (now Firuzkoh) has historically been limited and intermittent. In early 2022 Afghanistan's civil aviation authorities announced the resumption of activity at civilian and military airports nationwide following the change of government, while humanitarian access to Ghor has commonly relied on the United Nations Humanitarian Air Service (UNHAS). UN system reporting for 2022 noted that UNHAS was reaching Firuzkoh as part of rotations serving remote provincial capitals. In 2024, Afghan authorities stated that 27 airfields, including five international airports, were operational in the country, though scheduled services remained sparse at many regional fields.

== Geography and access ==
The airfield lies at the eastern edge of Firuzkoh, close to the Hari River valley and roughly 1–2 km from the town center, as indicated by the published coordinates and aeronautical charts.

== Accidents and incidents ==
- On 15 May 2024, an Mi-17 helicopter of the Afghan Air Force crashed near Firuzkoh during a rescue operation, reportedly due to technical issues. One person was killed and twelve were injured, according to official statements.

=== Former airlines and destinations ===
Airlines	Destinations
Bakhtar Afghan Airlines	Bamyan
Afghan Jet International	Kabul
Kam Air	Herat, Kabul

== See also ==
- List of airports in Afghanistan
