= Paropamisus =

Paropamisus may refer to:

- Paropamisadae, an old satrapy of the Alexandrian Empire in Afghanistan and Pakistan
- Paropamisus Mountains, in northwestern Afghanistan
