= Firuzkoh =

Firozkoh فیروزکوه Chaghcharan
- Provincial capital
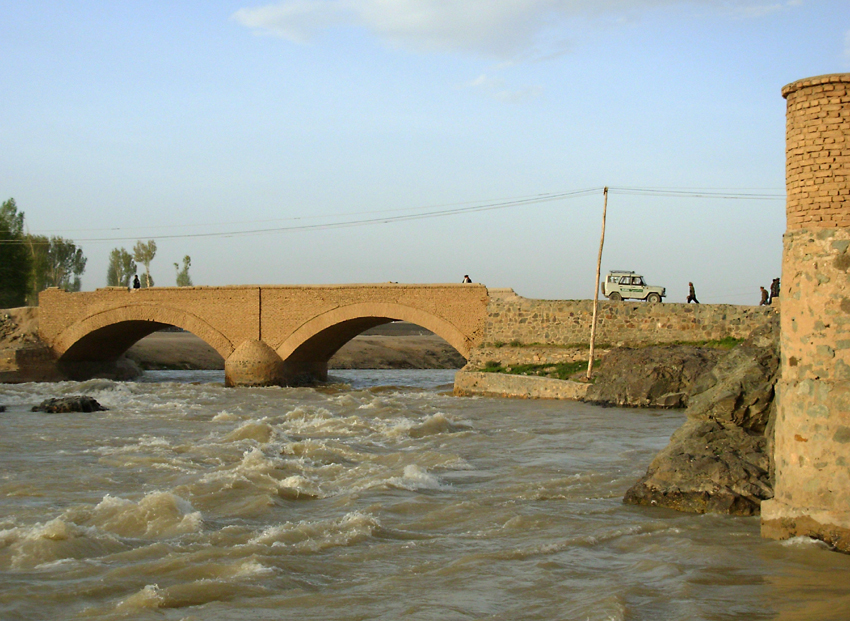
- The old bridge on Hari River in 2006
- Nickname: Ahangaran
- Location in Afghanistan
- Coordinates: 34°31′21″N 65°15′6″E
- Country: Afghanistan
- Province: Ghor
- District: Chaghcharan
- Established: 540-544 AD
- Founder: Ghiyath al-Din Muhammad

Government
  - Type: Municipality

Area
  - Land: 26 km^{2} (10 sq mi)
- Elevation: 2,230 m (7,320 ft)

Population (2025)
  - Provincial capital: 129,521
  - Urban: 9,128
  - Ethnicities: Aimaqs Uzbeks
- Time zone: UTC+04:30 (Afghanistan Time)

Firozkoh (Pashto (Note: Pashto pronunciation: [pi.roz.ko]), Dari (Note: Dari pronunciation: [fiː.ɾoːz.kʰoː]): فیروزکوه), formerly called Chaghcharan (Note: The capital of Ghor was called "Chaghcharan" until 2014, when the Afghan national government re-named the city into "Firozkoh" to reflect its historical roots, as it was the capital of the Ghurid Empire in the 12th century) (Pashto (Note: Pashto pronunciation: [t͡ʃaɣ.t͡ʃa.rɑn]), Dari (Note: Dari pronunciation: [t͡ʃʰäq.t͡ʃʰǽ.ɾɑ́ːn]): چغچران), and historically known as Ahangaran (Pashto (Note: Pashto pronunciation: [ʔɑŋˌɡa.rɑn]), Dari (Note: Dari pronunciation: [ʔɑːäŋ.ɡǽ.ɾɑ́ːn]): آهنگران), is a city in central Afghanistan, serving as the capital of Ghor Province. It is within the jurisdiction of Chaghcharan District and has an estimated population of 129,521 people.

Firozkoh is home to Ghor University, which is located about 6 km (3.7 mi) to the east from the city's center. The Chaghcharan Airport is located in the middle of the city.

== Geography ==
Firozkoh is located on the southern side of the Hari River, at an altitude of 2,230 m (7,320 ft) above sea level. The city is linked by a 380 km (240 mi) long highway with Herat to the west (following the south side of Paropamisus Mountains (Selseleh-ye Safīd Kūh)), and a 450 km (280 mi) long highway with Kabul to the east.

Firozkoh has a total land area of 26 km^{2} (10 sq mi) or 2,614 ha (6,460 acres). In 2015 there were 3,474 dwellings in the city.

=== Land use ===
Firozkoh is located at the central region of Afghanistan connected by a highway 380 km (240 mi) west to Herat and about the same east to Kabul. It is an ancient city that dates back to Genghis Khan and Mongols. The city has always been famous for agriculture.

== Climate ==
Chaghcharan has a warm-summer humid continental climate (Köppen Dsb), with snowy winters and warm, dry summers. Precipitation is low, and mostly falls in winter and spring.

Climate data for Chaghcharān
Month	Jan	Feb	Mar	Apr	May	Jun	Jul	Aug	Sep	Oct	Nov	Dec	Year
Record high °C (°F)	12.0 (53.6)	11.5 (52.7)	20.6 (69.1)	26.8 (80.2)	32.3 (90.1)	34.6 (94.3)	37.4 (99.3)	35.0 (95.0)	33.0 (91.4)	27.5 (81.5)	21.0 (69.8)	16.7 (62.1)	37.4 (99.3)
Mean daily maximum °C (°F)	−1.3 (29.7)	0.0 (32.0)	8.8 (47.8)	17.4 (63.3)	21.8 (71.2)	27.3 (81.1)	29.8 (85.6)	28.8 (83.8)	24.7 (76.5)	17.9 (64.2)	11.4 (52.5)	3.2 (37.8)	15.8 (60.5)
Daily mean °C (°F)	−9.4 (15.1)	−7.3 (18.9)	1.6 (34.9)	9.3 (48.7)	12.8 (55.0)	17.2 (63.0)	19.3 (66.7)	17.8 (64.0)	12.4 (54.3)	6.9 (44.4)	1.5 (34.7)	−4.4 (24.1)	6.5 (43.7)
Mean daily minimum °C (°F)	−16.3 (2.7)	−15.3 (4.5)	−3.9 (25.0)	2.1 (35.8)	3.5 (38.3)	4.9 (40.8)	7.1 (44.8)	5.3 (41.5)	−0.2 (31.6)	−2.8 (27.0)	−6.8 (19.8)	−11.1 (12.0)	−2.8 (27.0)
Record low °C (°F)	−44 (−47)	−46.0 (−50.8)	−26 (−15)	−10.8 (12.6)	−6.0 (21.2)	−2.7 (27.1)	0.5 (32.9)	−2.0 (28.4)	−8.0 (17.6)	−14.6 (5.7)	−19.5 (−3.1)	−35 (−31)	−46.0 (−50.8)
Average precipitation mm (inches)	30.9 (1.22)	32.2 (1.27)	40.0 (1.57)	35.3 (1.39)	20.1 (0.79)	0.4 (0.02)	0.1 (0.00)	0.5 (0.02)	0.0 (0.0)	11.0 (0.43)	15.8 (0.62)	18.1 (0.71)	204.4 (8.04)
Average rainy days	0	1	6	8	5	0	0	0	0	3	3	1	27
Average snowy days	8	9	5	1	0	0	0	0	0	0	2	7	32
Average relative humidity (%)	70	71	66	56	49	39	34	32	36	44	54	64	51
Mean monthly sunshine hours	146.4	150.2	198.6	223.9	320.6	383.9	389.4	358.0	344.7	267.7	217.9	154.7	3,156
Source: NOAA (1968-1983)

== History ==
=== Medieval ===
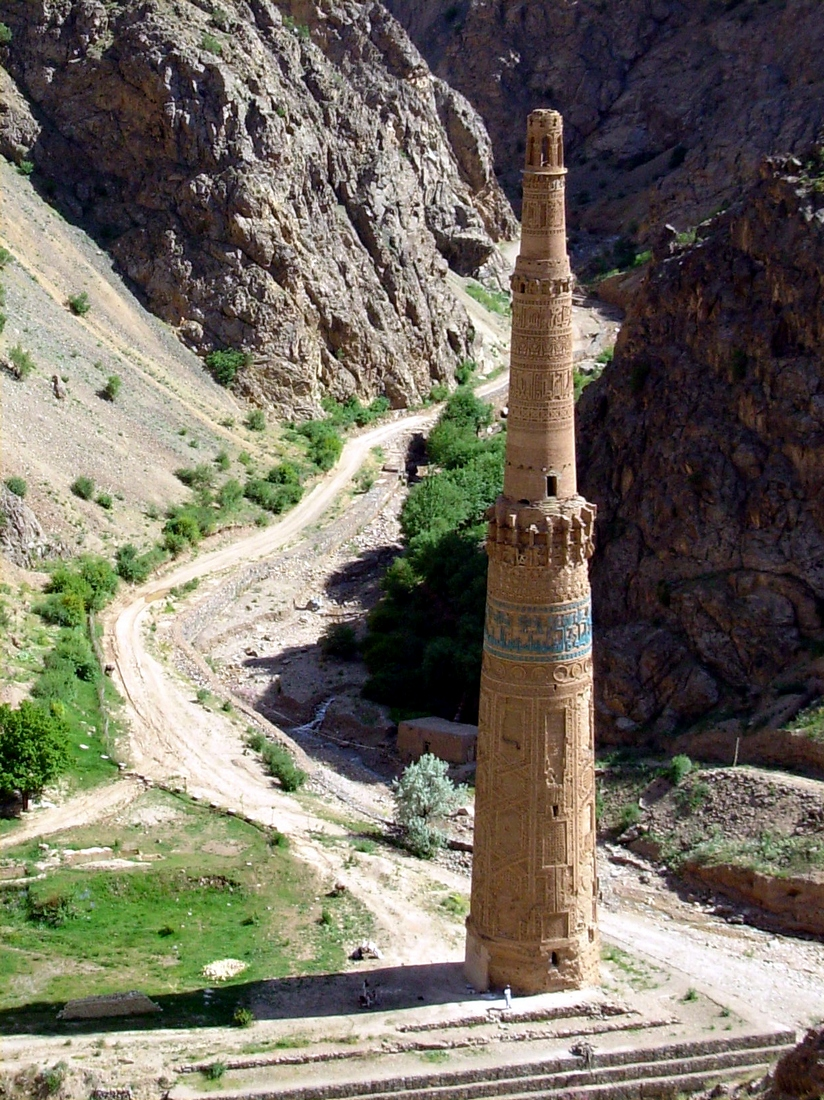
The Minaret of Jam built by the Ghurid dynasty is about 150 km (93 mi) to the west of Firzokoh

Prior to the arrival of Islam the region's inhabitants practiced various different religions including Zoroastrianism, Buddhism, Hinduism. The Islamic conquest of Afghanistan by Sultan Mahmud of Ghazni took place in the 10th century. After the defeat of the Ghaznavids in the 12th century the area came under the control of the local Ghurid dynasty of Ghor. The Ghurid Dynasty had its summer capital, Firozkoh nearby and they constructed the Minaret of Jam there. Today the Minaret of Jam is a UNESCO World Heritage Site. It is located about 150 km (93 mi) to the west of Firozkoh.

In the 13th century, the Ghor region was invaded by the Mongol army who destroyed Firozkoh but left the Minaret of Jam intact. It was then ruled by the Ilkhanate until Timur conquered it in the 14th century.

It is mentioned by the name Chakhcherān in the 16th century Baburnama, describing Babur's visit in early 1507 while on his journey to Kabul. It was a town located in the Gharjistan region, between Herat, Ghor, and Ghazni.

=== Modern era ===
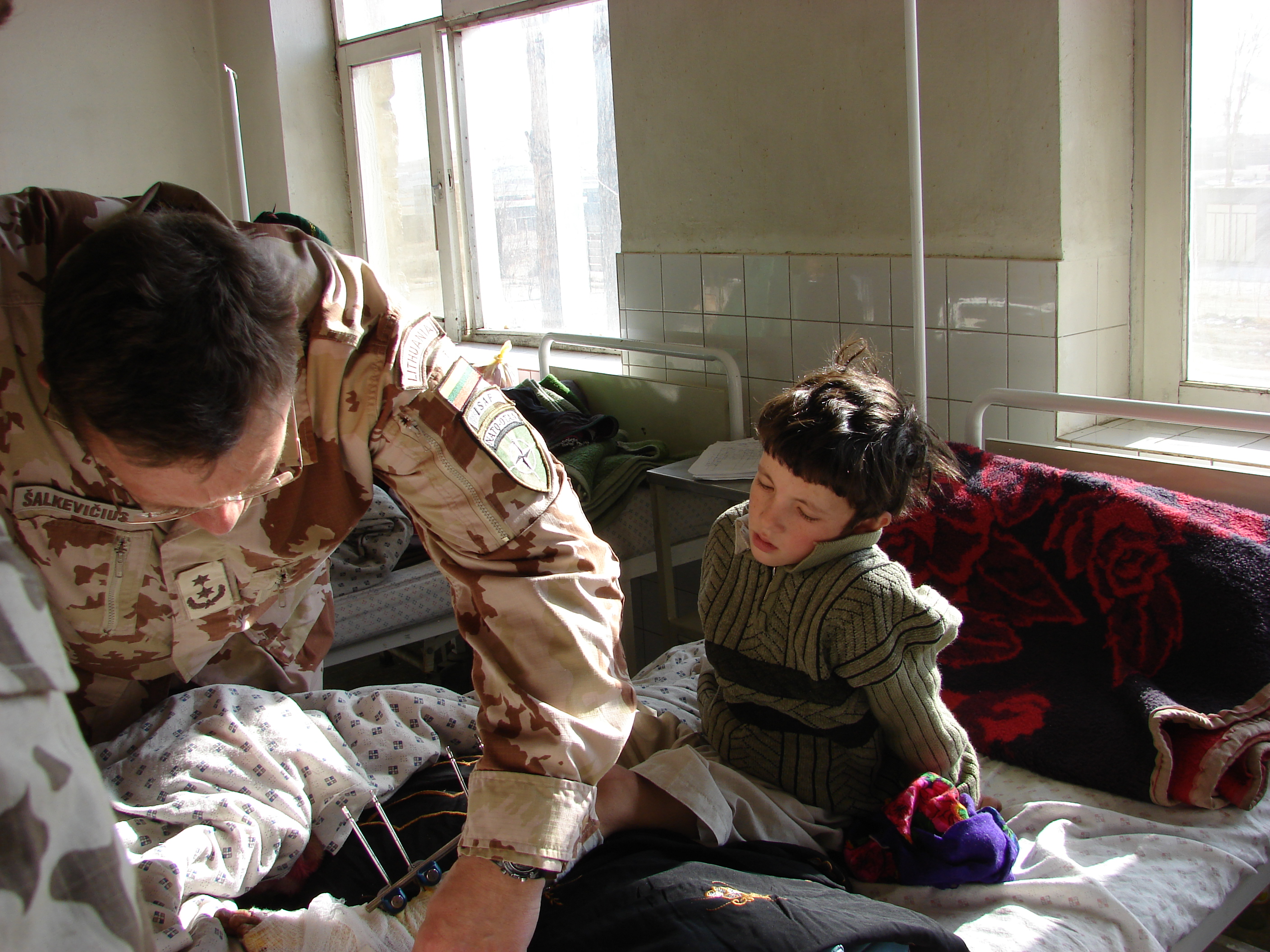
A Lithuanian medic visits a patient in Chaghcharan hospital in 2007

In 2004, an independent FM radio station (Persian: راديو صداي صلح or Voice of Peace Radio) came on air in the town, the first independent media in this part of Afghanistan.

In June 2005, the International Security Assistance Force (ISAF) established a Lithuanian led Provincial Reconstruction Team in which Croatian, Danish, American, Ukrainian, Icelandic, and Georgian troops also served.

On 14 May 2020, the Taliban attacked a checkpoint in the city, killing three Afghan soldiers and taking 11 others captive.

In August 2021 the city was retaken by Taliban fighters, becoming the sixteenth provincial capital to be seized as part of the wider 2021 Taliban offensive.

== Demography ==
The Firozkoh municipality has an estimated population of 129,521 people. In 2019 the estimate given was 150,982 people. Of these, 7,918 resided in the urban area and the remaining in the surrounding countryside. And in 2015 the estimate was 132,000 people. Majority of them are Aimaqs and Uzbek although Hazaras, Pashtuns and other groups also exist.

== Transportation ==
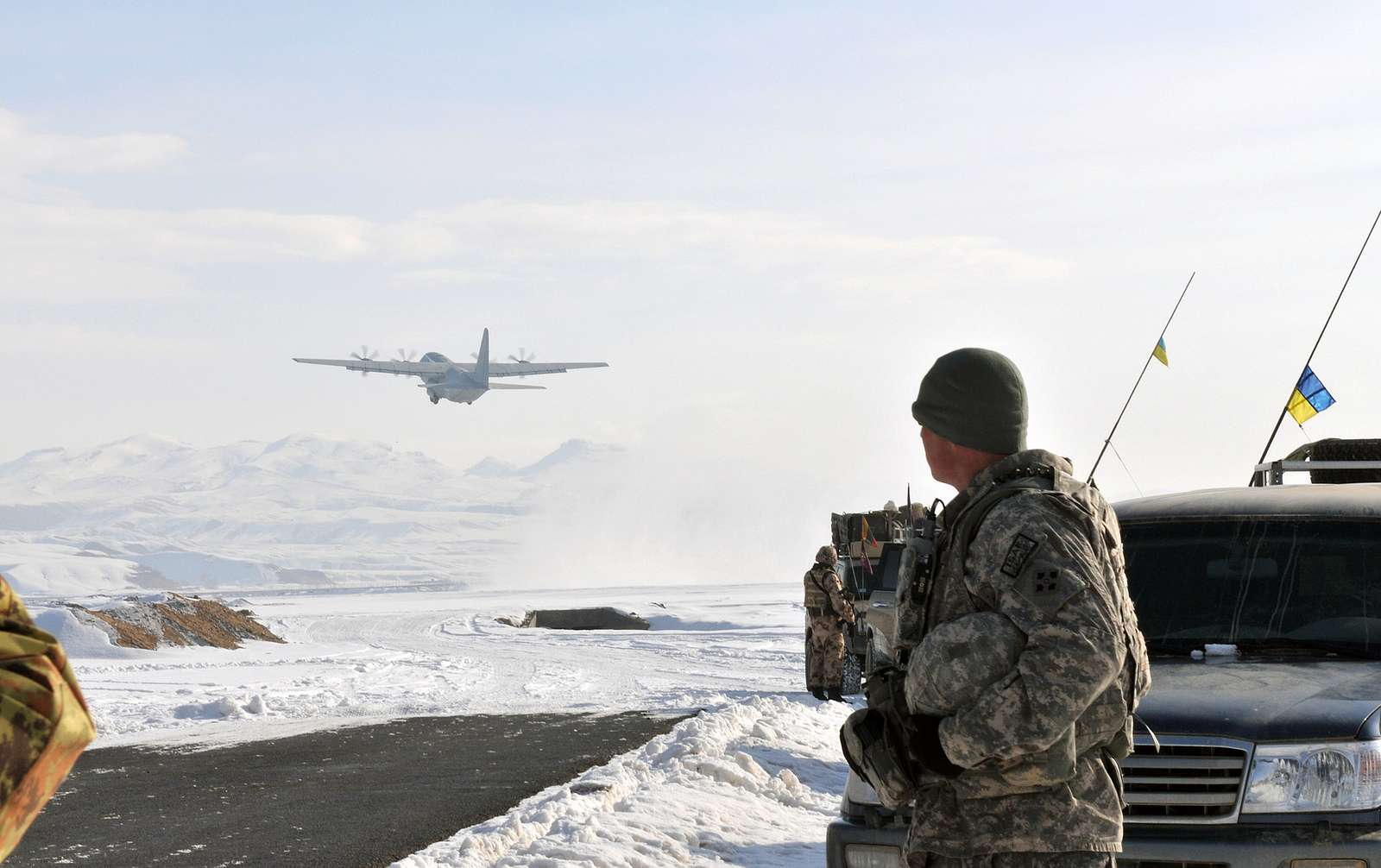
ISAF forces at Chaghcharan Airport in 2011

As of August 2015, Chaghcharan Airport, located northwest of the Hari River, one mile northeast of the city, had regularly scheduled flights to Kabul and Herat. However, as of January 2016 commercial operators no longer offer scheduled flights, leaving the United Nations Humanitarian Air Service (UNHAS) as the only user of Chaghcharan Airport with flights to Kabul and Herat.

The main road from Firozkoh runs toward Herat in the west and Kabul in the east. Due to severe weather, the road is often closed during winter and even in summer it can take days to drive from Firozkoh to Kabul.

== Economy ==
Agriculture is the primary economic activity in the area.

== Sports ==
The people of Firozkoh enjoy many types of sports, including football, futsal, volleyball, basketball, cycling, weightlifting, mountaineering, and wushu.

== See also ==
- List of cities in Afghanistan
