= Charsadda District =

Charsadda District may refer to:

- Charsadda District, Afghanistan
- Charsadda District, Pakistan

== See also ==
- Charsadda (disambiguation)
