= Drowning of Afghan refugees in the Hari River =

Drowning of Afghan Refugees in the Hari River
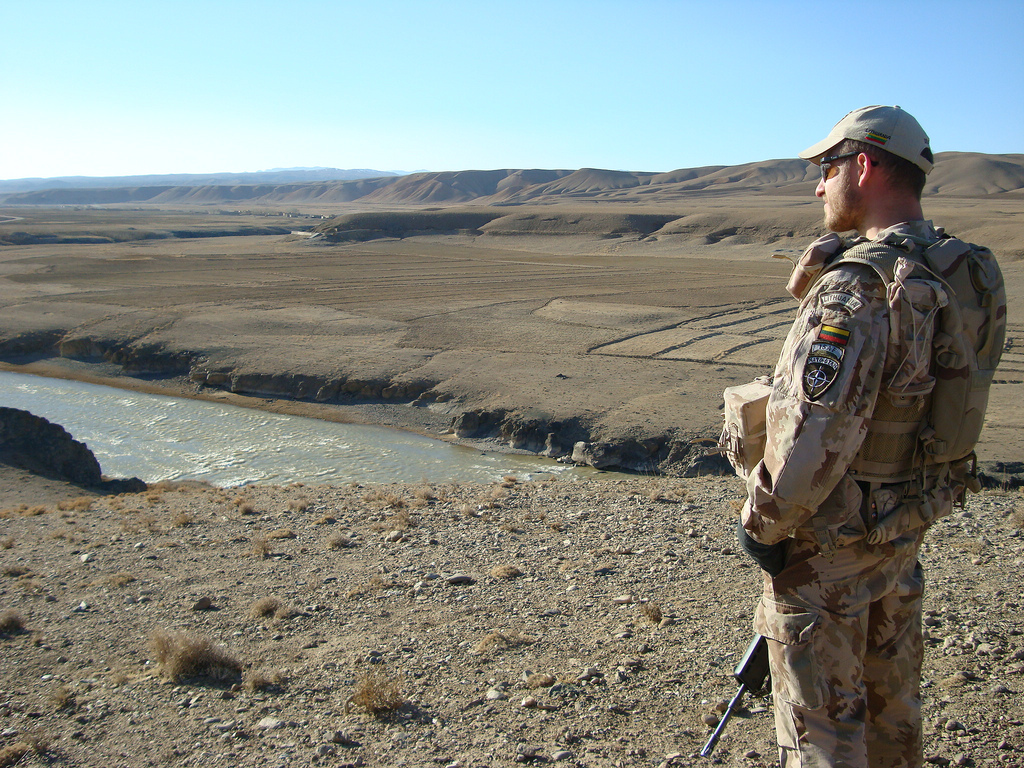
- The Hari River at the Afghanistan–Iran border
- Date: 1 May 2020
- Location: Hari River, Afghanistan–Iran border
- Type: Drowning
- Cause: Alleged forced drowning by Iranian border guards
- Participants: Iran border guards
- Deaths: Over 17
- Injuries: Over 45 Afghan refugees

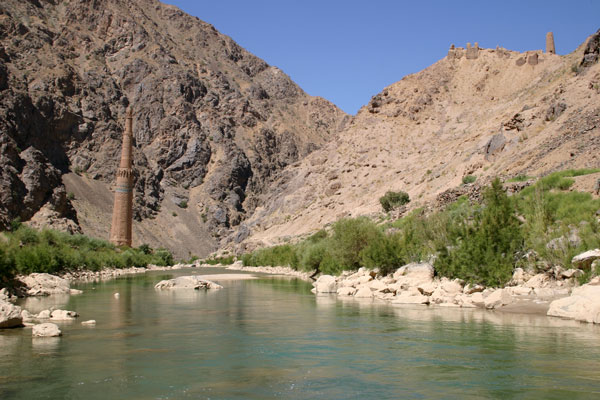
Hari River near the Minaret of Jam, Ghor Province

On May 1, 2020, a group of Afghan refugees tried to enter Iran and drowned in the Hari River on the border between Iran and Afghanistan.

Reuters and other new agencies reported, quoting Afghan lawmakers, that Iran's border guards killed the migrants by forcing them into the river at gunpoint.

== Incident ==
50 to 70 Afghan refugees tried to enter Iran by crossing the Hari River, which borders Herat Province with Iran, on May 1, 2020. These Afghans, according to some Afghan officials and the survivors, were arrested by Iranian border guards and after being beaten and tortured were thrown into the Hari River.

The Afghan Foreign Ministry said in a statement that an investigation had been launched into the incident and that initial assessments indicated that at least 70 Afghans trying to enter Iran from Herat had been beaten and thrown into the Hari River.

== Victims ==
By May 7, 2020, the bodies of 17 drowned immigrants had been found. According to Abdul Ghani Nouri, the governor of Gulan in Herat Province, there are signs of torture on the bodies.

== Survivors ==
Reuters quoted Noor Mohammad, one of the survivors of the incident, that “After being tortured, the Iranian soldiers threw all of us in the Hari River,”

One survivor told reporters the guards hit him with a pipe and pushed him into the river. Another said they had beaten him before throwing him into the river.

== Statements by Iranian officials denying the charges ==
Citing to the slope of the Harirod River, Iranian officials have denied the allegations, as the bodies must have been found in Iranian soil if the Afghan claims were believed, but according to the Afghan workers' comments, the bodies were found on Afghan soil, so it would not be acceptable for Iranian border guards to throw the Afghans into Hari. Afghan officials blamed that the Iranian guards had entered well into the Afghan territory.

The forensic doctor of Herat city declared that there was no evidence of torture on the bodies. Also, due to the muddy nature of the Helmand River, no traces of mud have been seen on the bodies.

== Reactions ==
Former President Ashraf Ghani of Afghanistan had ordered an investigation into the incident. Ghani formed a ten-member team to check the recovered bodies. Signs of torture on some of the bodies have been observed. On 11 May, hundreds of Afghans gathered in front of the Iranian Consulate in Herat to show their anger towards the death of their fellow citizens who were allegedly drowned by Iranian border guards. The crowd chanted, “Death to Rouhani, Death to Khamenei,”

== See also ==
- May 2020 Afghanistan attacks
- Anti-Afghan sentiment
