= Dolyna District =

Dolyna دولینه
- District
- Location within Afghanistan
- Coordinates: 34°09′22″N 64°47′11″E
- Country: Afghanistan
- Province: Ghor

Population
  - Estimate (2025): 44,452
- Time zone: UTC+04:30 (Afghanistan Time)

Dolyna, also written as Dolaina, Dolayna or Dolina (Pashto/Dari: دولینه), is one of the 13 districts of Ghor Province in central Afghanistan. It has an estimated population of 44,452 people. Dolyna District was created from part of the much larger Chaghcharan District in 2005.

== See also ==
- Districts of Afghanistan
