= Charsadda (disambiguation) =

Charsadda may refer to:

- Charsadda, a city in Pakistan
- Charsadda Tehsil, Pakistan
- Charsadda District (disambiguation)
  - Charsadda District, Pakistan, Pakistan
  - Charsadda District (Afghanistan), in Ghor Province, Afghanistan

== See also ==
- Charsadda attack (disambiguation)
