= Gora, Russia =

Gora (Russian: Гора) may refer to several rural localities in Russia.

== Moscow Oblast ==
As of 2009, six rural localities in Moscow Oblast bear this name:

- Gora, Dmitrovsky District, Moscow Oblast, a village in Dmitrovsky District
- Gora (Davydovskoye Rural Settlement), Orekhovo-Zuyevsky District, Moscow Oblast, a village in Orekhovo-Zuyevsky District; municipally a part of Davydovskoye Rural Settlement
- Gora (Gorskoye Rural Settlement), Orekhovo-Zuyevsky District, Moscow Oblast, a village in Orekhovo-Zuyevsky District; municipally a part of Gorskoye Rural Settlement
- Gora, Pavlovo-Posadsky District, Moscow Oblast, a village in Pavlovo-Posadsky District
- Gora, Shatursky District, Moscow Oblast, a village in Shatursky District
- Gora, Yegoryevsky District, Moscow Oblast, a village in Yegoryevsky District

== Perm Krai ==
- Gora, Alexandrovsky District, Perm Krai

== Vladimir Oblast ==
As of 2009, one rural locality in Vladimir Oblast bears this name:

- Gora, Vladimir Oblast, a village in Petushinsky District

== Other ==
- Gora, name of several other rural localities in Russia
