= Kashan (Murghab) =

River in Turkmenistan

Coordinates: 35°01′N 66°11′E

Kashan River is the left tributary of Murghab River in the Central Asian states of Afghanistan and Turkmenistan.

== History ==
Kashan River flows into Badghis province, northwest of Afghanistan on the northern side of the Selseleh-ye Safīd Kūh (ancient name: Paropamisus ). From the north it flows to Turkmenistan and into the Murghab River close to Tagtabazar.
