= Tulak District =

Tulak تولک
- District
- Location within Afghanistan
- Coordinates: 33°58′22″N 63°42′24″E
- Country: Afghanistan
- Province: Ghor
- Capital: Kwajaha
- Elevation: 2,260 m (7,410 ft)

Population (2019)
  - Total: 103,612
- Time zone: + 4.30

Tulak District (Dari: ولسوالی تولک) is located in the southwestern part of the Ghor province, Afghanistan. It is a mountainous district like the whole province. The population is 103,612 and the district center is Kwajaha.

The Nalbandon zinc-lead deposit is located in the district. According to a study by the German Geological Mission, the reserves were estimated to be 130,000 tons of zinc and 12,000 tons of lead.
