= Charsadda District, Afghanistan =

Charsadda چارسده
- District
- Location within Afghanistan
- Coordinates: 34°54′56″N 65°17′17″E
- Country: Afghanistan
- Province: Ghor
- Center: Qale-Zobayd
- Elevation: 2,100 m (6,900 ft)

Population (2012)
  - Total: 26,600

Charsada (Chahar Sada) District is a district of Ghor Province, Afghanistan. It was created from the northwestern part of Chaghcharan District in 2005. The district center is Qale-Zobayd. It has a population of 26,600 people.

== See also ==
- Chaghcharan District
- Ghor Province
- Qale-Zobayd
