= Syria–Turkey Friendship Dam =

Dam in Syria and Turkey

- Location within Turkey
- Country: Syria/Turkey
- Location: Turkey
- Coordinates: 36°10′01″N 36°21′53″E
- Status: Open
- Construction began: 2011
- Opening date: January 2020
- Construction cost: US$28.5 million

Dam and spillways
- Type of dam: Embankment
- Impounds: Orontes River
- Height: 14.5 m (48 ft)
- Length: 580 m (1,903 ft)

Reservoir
- Total capacity: 115,000,000 m^{3} (93,232 acre⋅ft)

The Friendship Dam is a dam on the Orontes River between the Syrian village of al-Alani, and the Turkish village of Ziyaret. It will cost $28.5 million and will be able to generate 16 million kilowatt-hours of electricity every year and supply water for 10,000 hectares of agricultural soil. In late June 2011 it was reported that the construction was delayed due to the uprising in Syria. A protocol which was supposed to be signed between the two countries, was not.

== See also ==
- Iran–Turkmenistan Friendship Dam
