= Gora, Alexandrovsky District, Perm Krai =

Gora Гора
- Village
- Location within Perm Krai Location within Russia
- Coordinates: 59°08′N 57°10′E
- Country: Russia
- Region: Perm Krai
- District: Alexandrovsky District
- Time zone: UTC+5:00

Gora (Russian: Гора) is a rural locality (a village) in Vsevolodo-Vilvenskoye Urban Settlement, Alexandrovsky District, Perm Krai, Russia. The population was 3 as of 2010. There are 2 streets.

== Geography ==
Gora is located 4 km west of Alexandrovsk (the district's administrative centre) by road.
