= Marghab District =

Marghab District ولسوالی مرغاب
- District
- Location within Afghanistan
- Coordinates: 34°58′31″N 65°36′39″E
- Country: Afghanistan
- Province: Ghor Province
- Elevation: 2,150 m (7,050 ft)

Population (2019)
  - Total: 19,000

Marghab District (Dari ولسوالی مرغاب), is a district located in Ghor Province, Afghanistan, created on 26 November 2019. Shorabak area serves as the district center. President Ghani decreed the creation of the district through decree No. 632 from the Presidential Palace. The district encompasses 32 villages and has approximately 25000 inhabitants and its mainly populated by Tajiks .

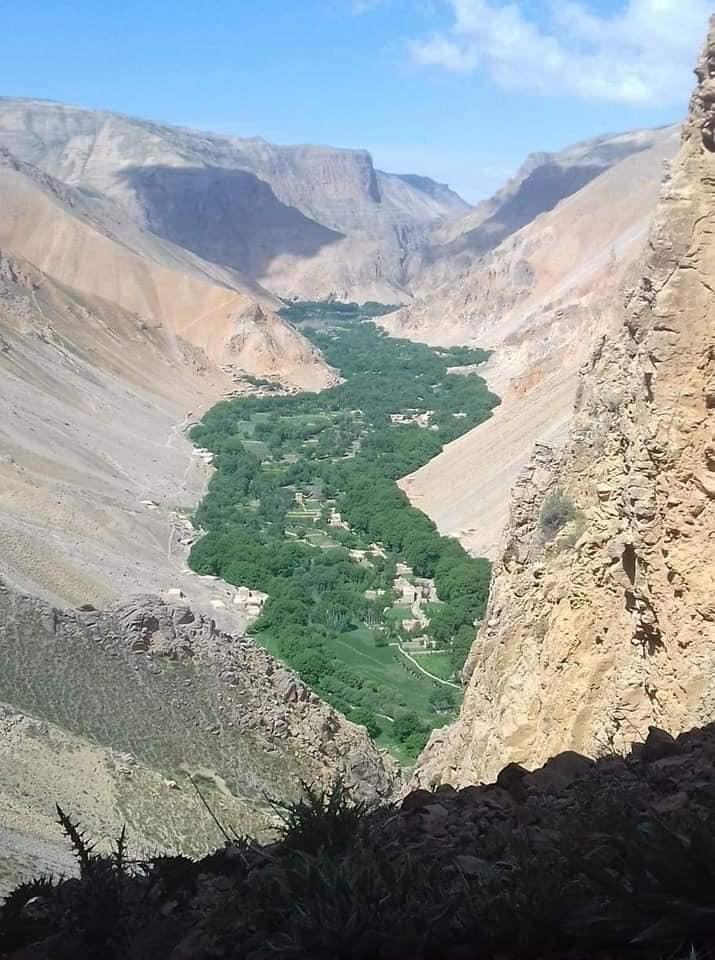
Sparf is the most populous area of Marghab district

Most of the population live in the valley of the Marghab River.

== Economy ==
The district suffers from poverty and a weak economy.
