= Iran–Turkmenistan Friendship Dam =

Binational dam on the Hari river

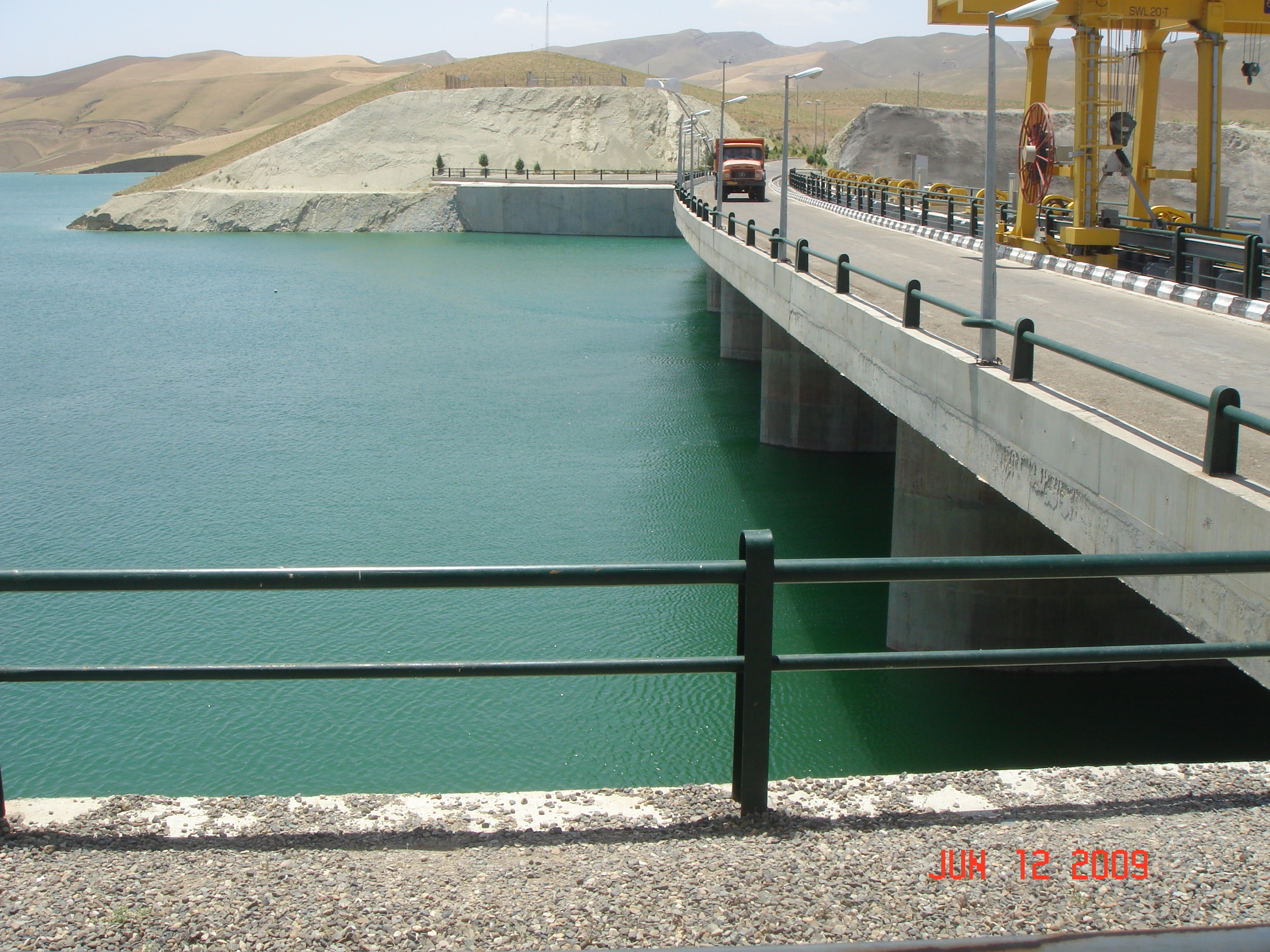
- Interactive map of Iran–Turkmenistan Friendship Dam
- Official name: Doosti Reservoir Dam
- Country: Iran/Turkmenistan
- Status: Operational
- Opening date: 2005
- Owners: Turkmenistan: Ministry of Water & Land Reclamation; Iran: Razavi Khorasan Regional Water Authority

Dam and spillways
- Type of dam: Embankment, earth-fill
- Impounds: Hariroud (Hari River)
- Height: 78 m (256 ft)
- Length: 655 m (2,149 ft)
- Width (crest): 15 m (49 ft)
- Dam volume: 4,500,000 m^{3} (5,885,778 cu yd)
- Spillway type: 8 x gated ogee

Reservoir
- Total capacity: 1,250,000,000 m^{3} (1,013,391 acre⋅ft)
- Active capacity: 735,000,000 m^{3} (595,874 acre⋅ft)
- Inactive capacity: 300,000,000 m^{3} (243,214 acre⋅ft)

Power Station
- Turbines: 3 x Francis-type
- Installed capacity: 16 MW

The Iran–Turkmenistan Friendship Dam, or Doosti Reservoir Dam (Persian: سد دوستی, Turkmen: Dostluk Suw Howdany), is a dam on the Hari river (Hariroud), which forms part of the international boundary between Iran and Turkmenistan (the Iran-Turkmenistan border). The dam was completed in 2004, and both countries agreed that each would have an equal right to the waters of the river, which amount to 820 million cubic metres. It was officially opened on 12 April 2005. The dam provides drinking water and irrigation for the surrounding areas, along with hydroelectric power.

== See also ==
- Syria–Turkey Friendship Dam
- List of dams and reservoirs in Iran
- Dams in Iran
