= Gora, Vladimir Oblast =

Gora Гора
- Village
- Location within Vladimir Oblast Location within Russia
- Coordinates: 55°54′N 39°12′E
- Country: Russia
- Region: Vladimir Oblast
- District: Petushinsky District
- Time zone: UTC+3:00

Gora (Russian: Гора) is a rural locality (a village) in Nagornoye Rural Settlement, Petushinsky District, Vladimir Oblast, Russia. The population was 48 as of 2010. There are 2 streets.

== Geography ==
Gora is located 18 km west of Petushki (the district's administrative centre) by road. Nagorny is the nearest rural locality.
