= Paropamisus Mountains =

Mountain range in Afghanistan

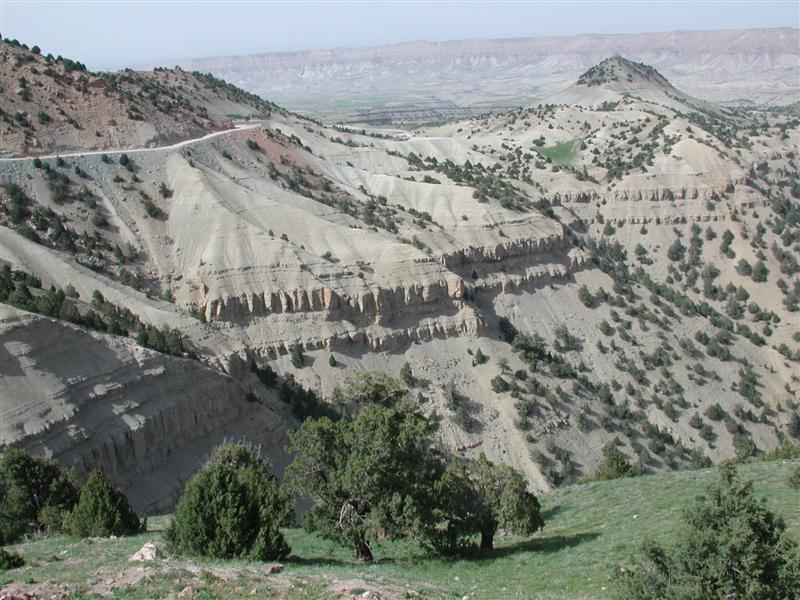

Highest point
- Elevation: 3,592 m (11,785 ft)
- Coordinates: 34°28′01″N 63°1′51″E

Geography
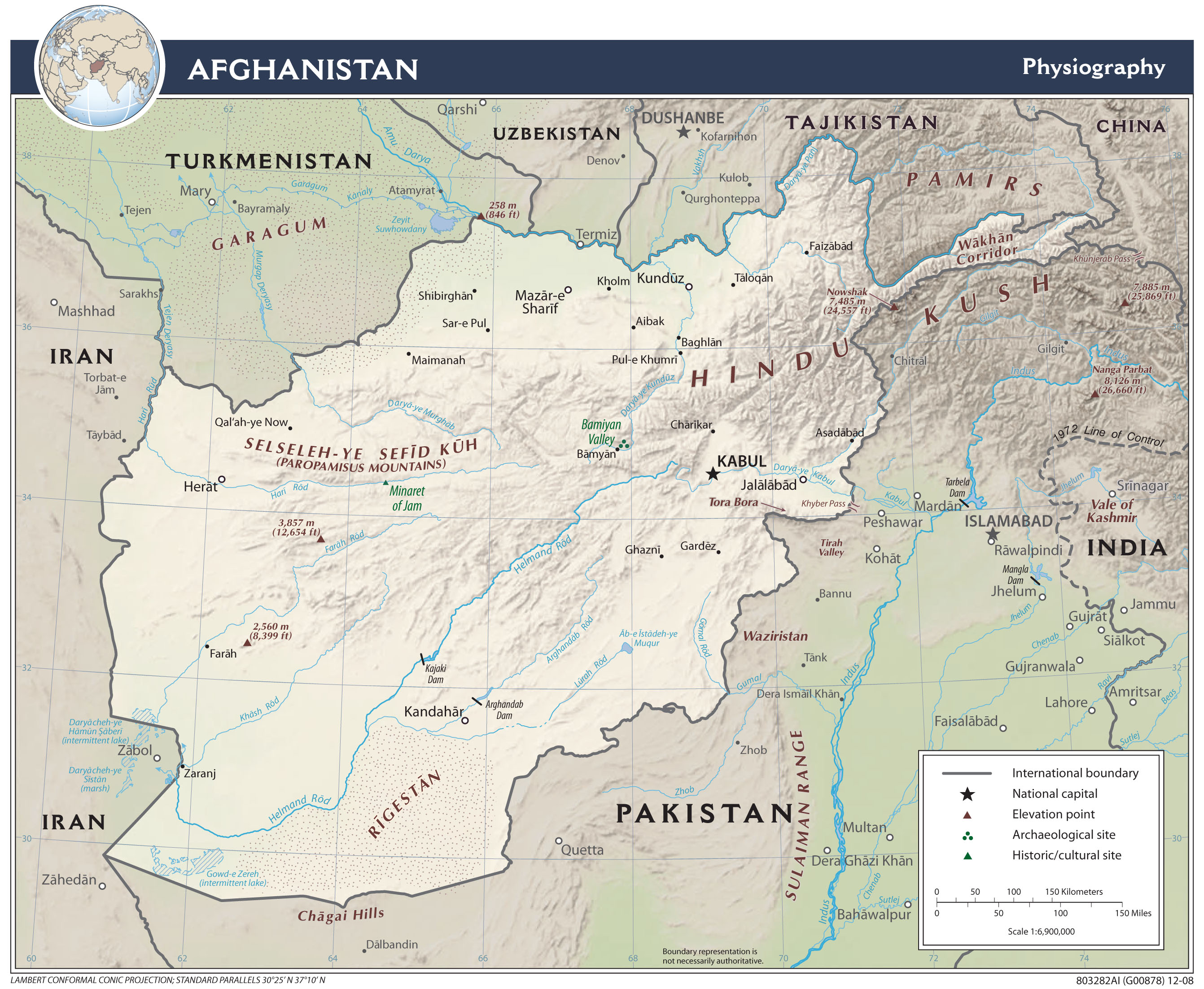
- Location: Northwestern Afghanistan

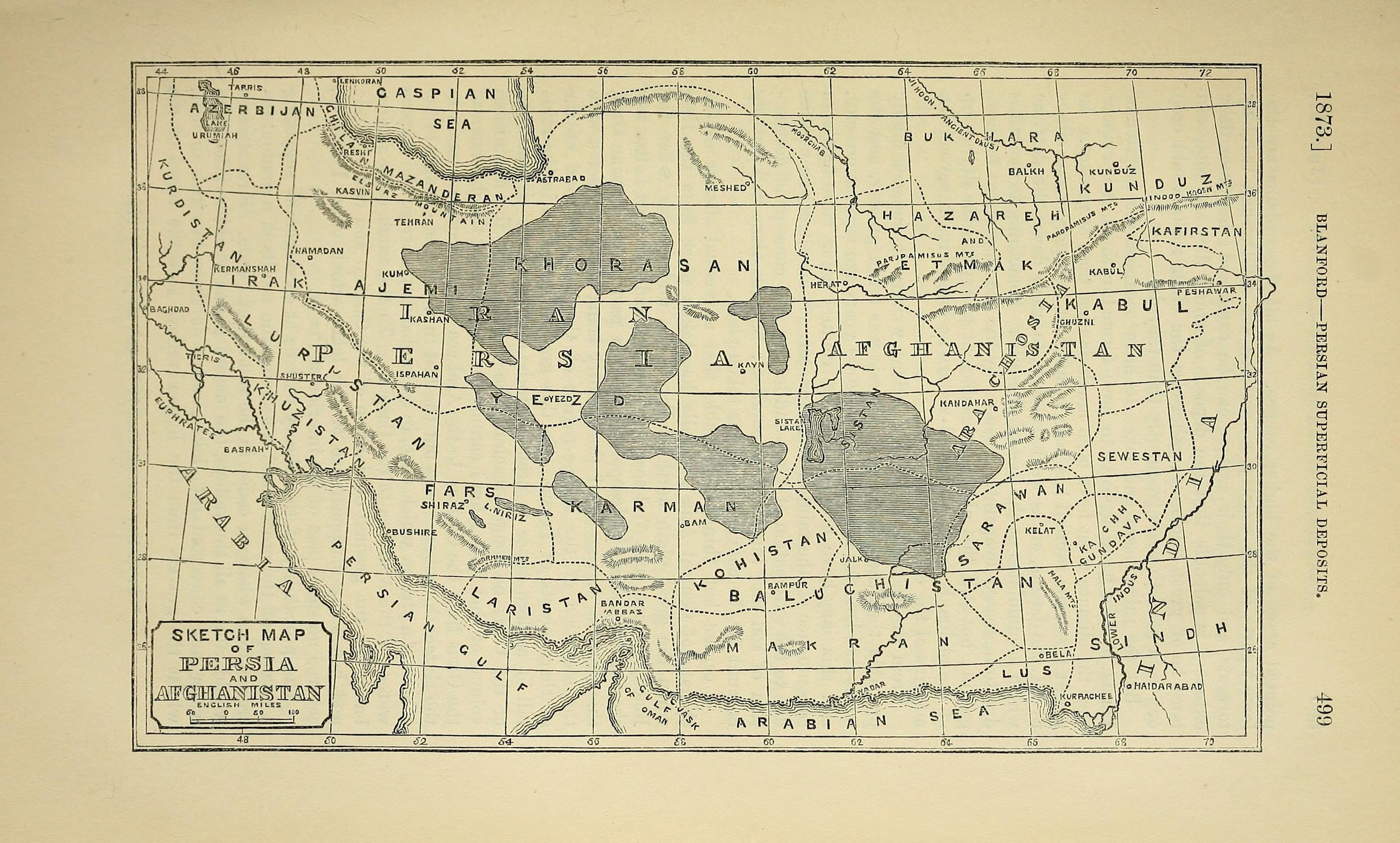
Note the wider conception of what is today Paropamisus Mts.. Here it is the whole northern side of the extensions of Hindukush, map from 1873

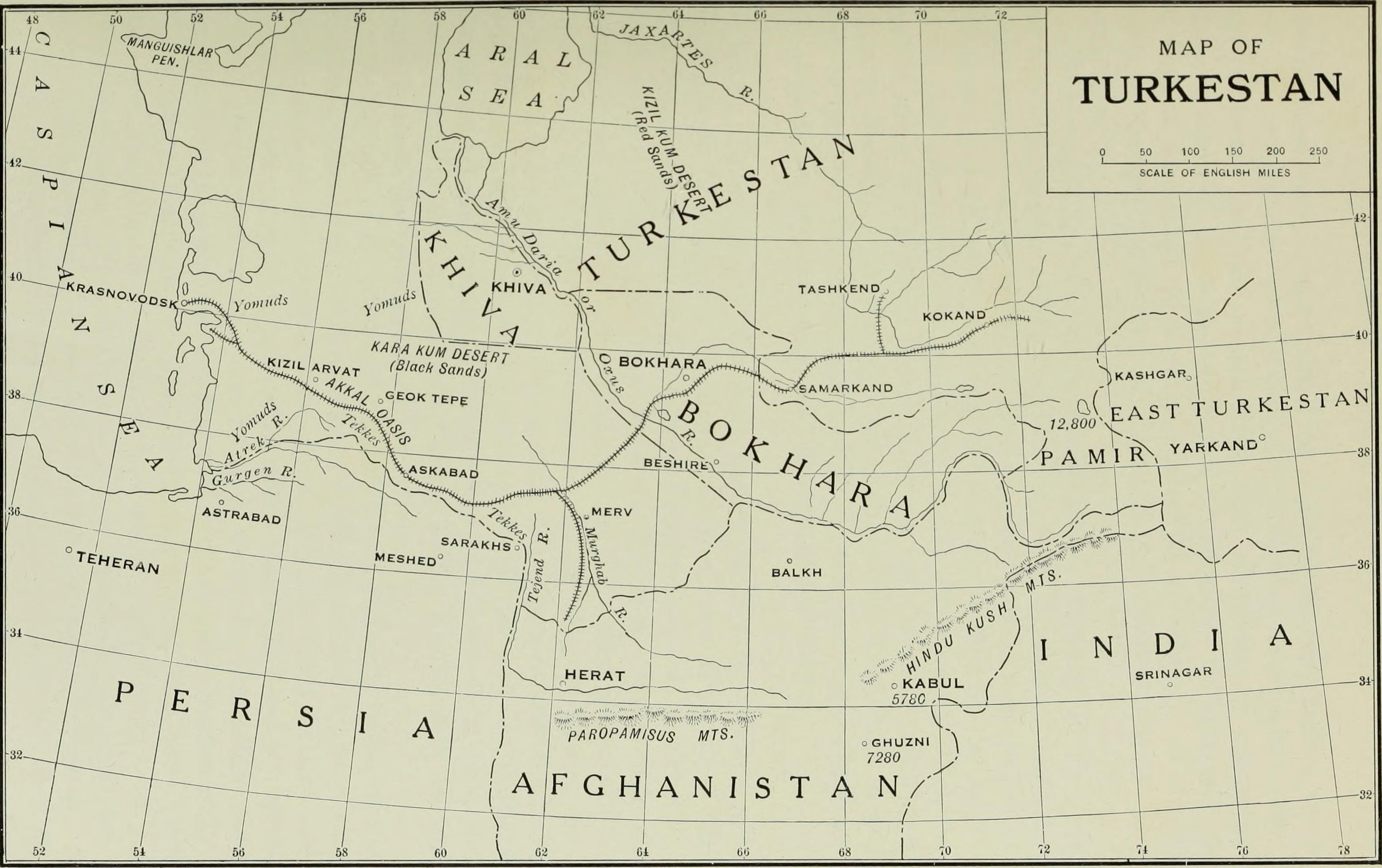
Note the probably wrong position of what is today Paropamisus Mts. Here it is on the south side of Hari river, map from 1922

The Paropamisus Mountains (locally known as Selseleh-ye Safīd Kūh or Silsila-yi Safēd Kōh ('White Mountain range')) is a mountain range in north western Afghanistan stretching circa 300 mi (480 km) between the western extension of the Hindu Kush in the east (near Chaghcharan, also called Firozkoh) and following the north bank of the Hari River via Herat toward the eastern extensions of Alborz Mountains in Iran in the west. These mountains are part of the large Alpide belt.

Silver and lead deposits are found in Paropamisus. The Marghab River rise is in the region.

== See also ==
- List of mountain ranges of the world
- Paropamisadae
