= Hari (Afghanistan) =

River flowing from Afghanistan to Turkmenistan

Coordinates: 34°39′N 66°43′E

Hari River
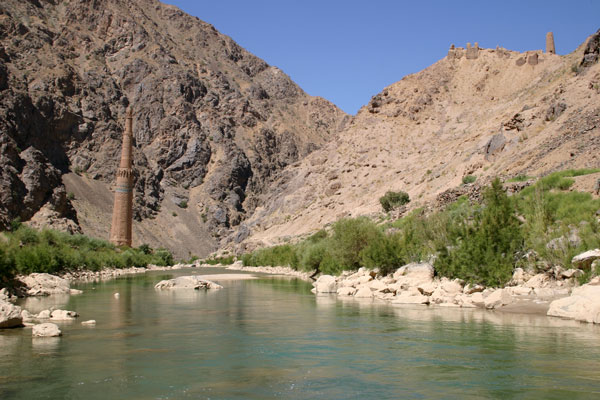

Location
- Countries: Afghanistan and Turkmenistan

Physical characteristics
- Source
  - location: Koh-i-Baba
- Mouth
  - location: Karakum Desert
- Length: 1,100 km (680 mi)
- Basin size: 39,300 km2

The Hari River (Persian: هریرود or Dari: هری رود, romanized: Harī Rōd; Pashto: د هري سیند) or Herat River or Tejen River or Harirud is a river flowing 1,100 kilometres (680 mi) from the mountains of central Afghanistan to Turkmenistan, where it forms the Tejen oasis and disappears in the Karakum Desert. In its lower course, the river forms a northern part of the border between Afghanistan and Iran, and a southeastern part of the border between Turkmenistan and Iran.

The name of the river derives from the Old Persian word Harawaiah 'river rich in water'.

== Archaeology ==
In Turkmenistan, the Hari is known as the Tejen or Tedzhen river and passes close to the city of Tejen.

Geoksyur Oasis in Turkmenistan is a major prehistoric archaeological complex in the valley of Tedjen river/Hari Rud in the foothills of the Kopetdag.

To the ancient Greeks, the river was known as the Arius. In Latin, it was known as the Tarius.

One theory suggests that the Rigvedic Sarayu and the Hari are the same river.

A Buddhist monastery hand-carved in the bluff of the river Harirud existed in the first centuries during the prevalence of Buddhism. The artificial caves revealed testimony of daily life of the Buddhist monks.

== Course ==
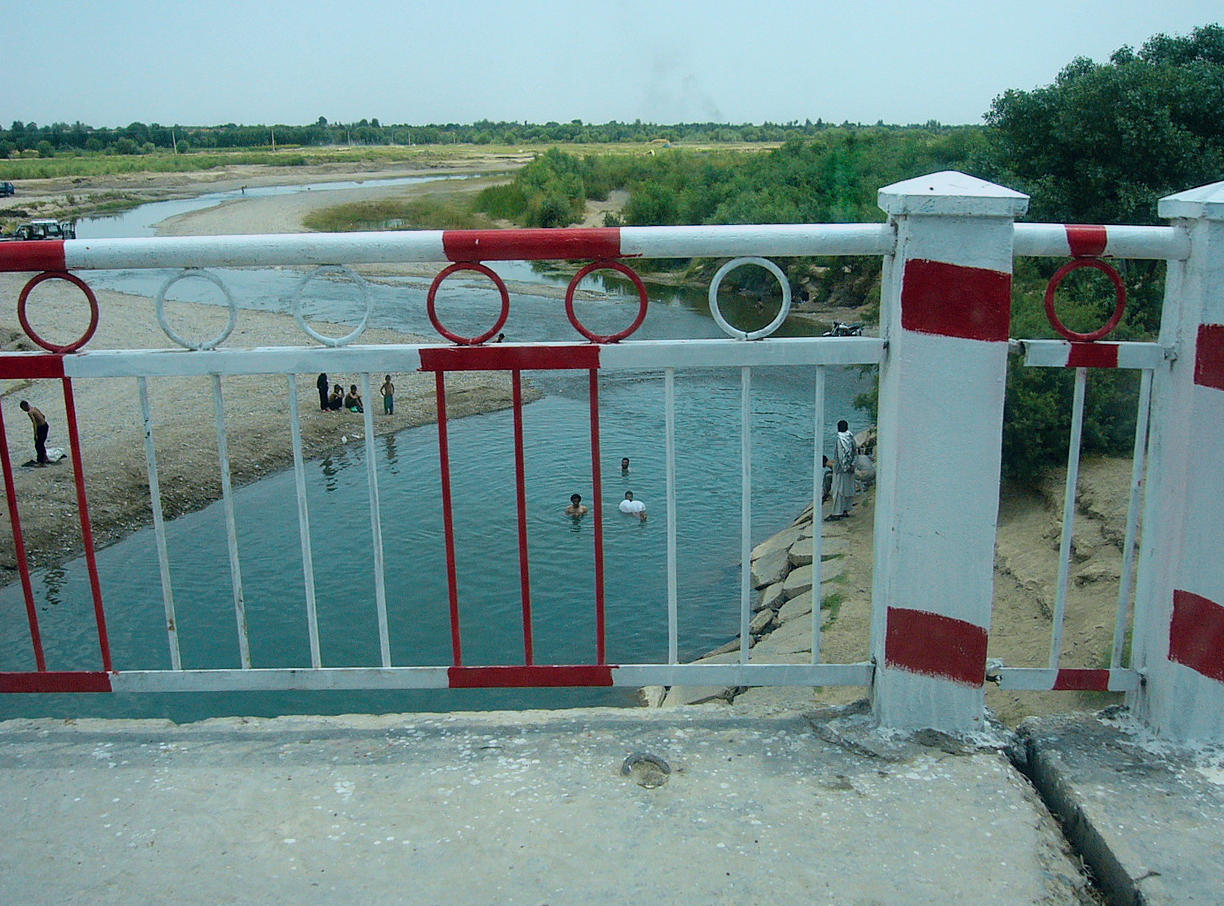
The Hari River near Herat

The river originates in the eastern part of Ghor Province in the Baba mountain range, part of the extensions of Hindu Kush system, and follows a relatively straight course to the west.

Some 200 kilometres (120 mi) upstream from Herat, the river meets the Jam River at the site of the Minaret of Jam, the second tallest ancient minaret in the world at 65 metres (213 ft).

In western Afghanistan, the Hari Rud flows to the south of Herat. The valley around Herat with the Paropamisus Mountains (Selseleh-ye Safēd Kōh) on the right river bank was historically famous for its fertility and dense cultivation. After Herat, the river turns northwest, then north, forming the northern part of the border between Afghanistan and Iran. Farther north it forms the south-eastern part of the border between Iran and Turkmenistan. The Iran–Turkmenistan Friendship Dam is on the river.

Salma Dam, a hydroelectric and irrigation dam project, is located on the Hari Rud in Chishti Sharif District of Herat Province in western Afghanistan.

The average annual discharge of the Hari Rud is about 55 m3/s, but during a spring flood in 1939 the discharge went up to 1090 m3/s.

In 2000, the river dried up completely during a 10-month drought.

== Bridges ==
=== Pulkhatyn Bridge ===
An unused stone-bridge of five arches, this falls in the Ahal Region of Turkmenistan. It is about 2 kilometres (1.2 mi) north of Iran–Turkmenistan Friendship Dam.

Pulkhatyn translates to "wealthy woman." In Turkmen lore, the custodian of the bridge was a woman who made a fortune by taxing all travelers; Alexander the Great had apparently refused to pay this fee and crossed further downstream.

== See also ==
- 2020 drowning of Afghan refugees in the Hari River
- Badhyz State Nature Reserve
- Kushk River
- Rigvedic rivers
