= Chaghcharan District =

Chaghcharan چغچران فیروزکوه
- District
- Location within Afghanistan
- Coordinates: 34.5225°N 65.2517°E
- Country: Afghanistan
- Province: Ghor
- Center: Chaghcharan
- Elevation: 7,380 ft (2,250 m)

Population
  - Ethnicities: Tajiks
  - Religions: Islam

Chaghcharan District (Dari: ولسوالی چغچران) is a district in Ghor province in Afghanistan. It lies in the high altitude region in central Afghanistan. Its rugged geography, harsh winters and limited infrastructure, has led to the development of isolate communities with low literacy. While agriculture and livestock sustain its population, development projects in the 21st century have begun to enhance transport, water, and municipal services. Rich in Ghurid-era remnants such as the Minaret of Jam and ancient forts, the region retains a historical significance.

== History ==
Chaghcharan was historically known as Firozkoh, and was founded as the summer capital of the Ghurid dynasty in the 12th century. The iconic 65 m (213 ft)-high Minaret of Jam was constructed during Sultan Ghiyath al-Din Muhammad’s reign in the 1190s. In the 13th century, subsequent Mongol invasions led to the destruction of Firozkoh, although the Minaret survived. The name Chaghcharan derives from Dari for "tent" (chagh) and "pasture" (charan), reflecting its pastoral traditions and nomadic heritage among Aimaq tribes.

== Geography ==
Chaghcharan District lies in the western Hindu Kush range at approximately 2,250 m (7,380 ft) above sea level in central Afghanistan. The region experiences severe winters that often block access due to snow. The region is drained by the Hari (Hiray) and Morghab rivers, which offer potential for hydropower and irrigation projects.

== Demographics ==
As of 2020, Chaghcharan District had an estimated 132,537 residents, making it one of the most densely populated areas in Ghor Province. The broader province had an ethnic composition of about 58% Tajiks, 39% Hazaras, and 3% Pashtuns. Literacy rate stood at an estimated 15%, and only about 16% of inhabitants have access to potable water while only 6% had access to electricity. Agriculture and livestock are the economic backbone of Chaghcharan, with crops grown including wheat, barley, and sesame. Economic hardship had driven young men to migrate for work toward Herat or countries like Iran, and opium poppy cultivation has seen a resurgence as a lucrative alternative. Healthcare services include one hospital in Chaghcharan and rural clinics, although remote access remains very limited. Educational facilities across Ghor include 293 primary schools, 58 secondary schools, and 31 high schools, but infrastructure and staffing challenges hinder literacy improvements. USAID and other non-governmental initiatives have improved infrastructure such as roads, canals, water wells, and other municipal services in the 21st century.

== See also ==
- Chaghcharan
- Districts of Afghanistan
