= Ghor Province =

Province of Afghanistan

Ghōr غور
- Province
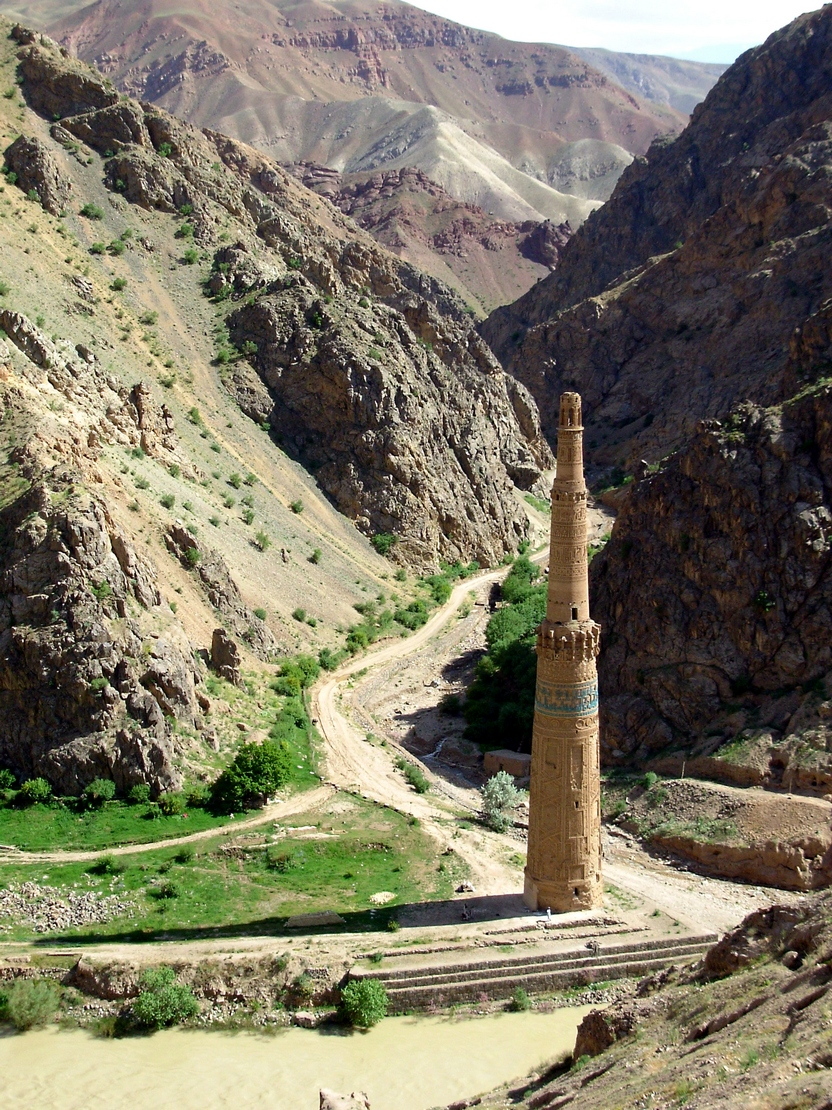
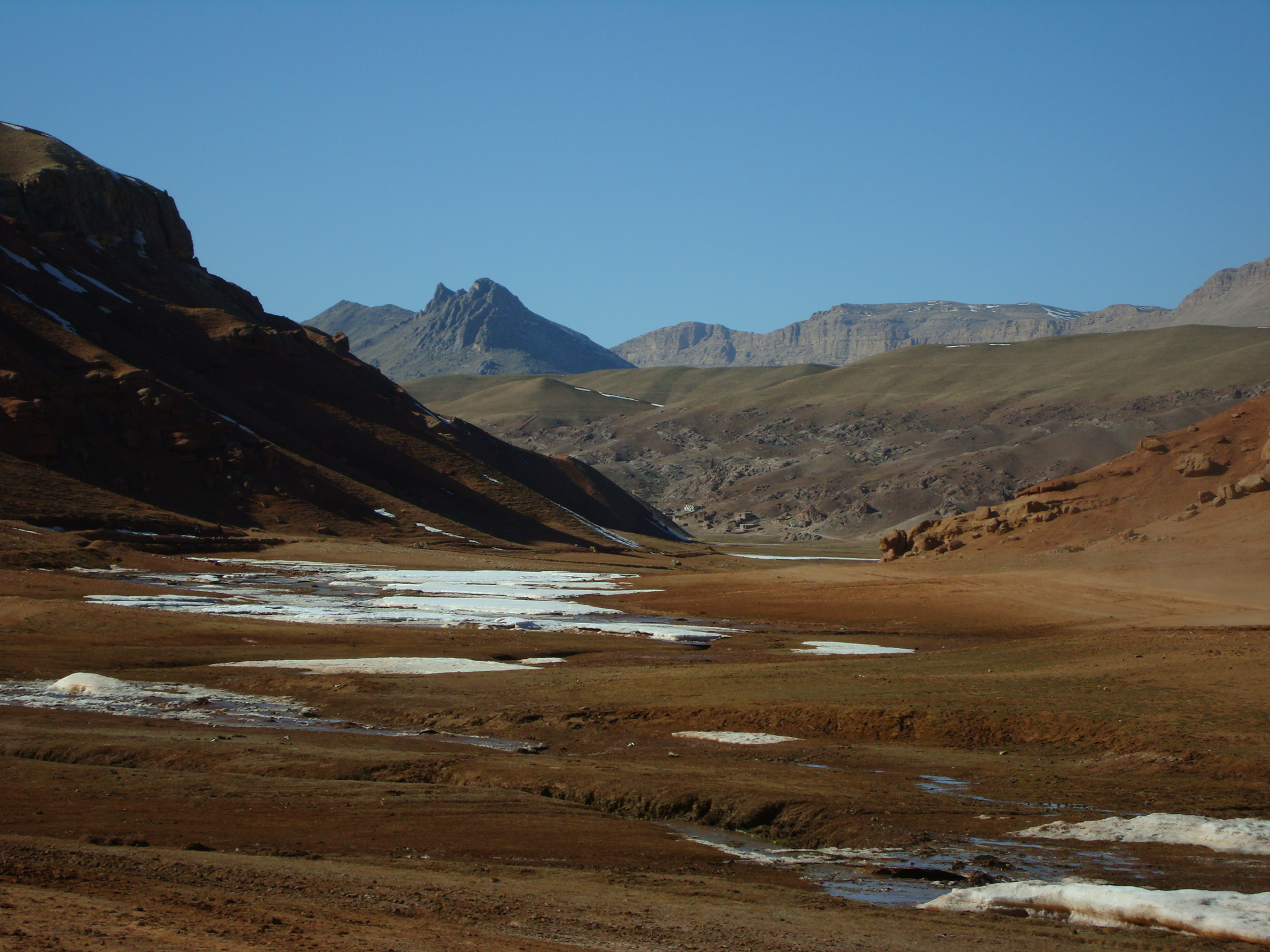
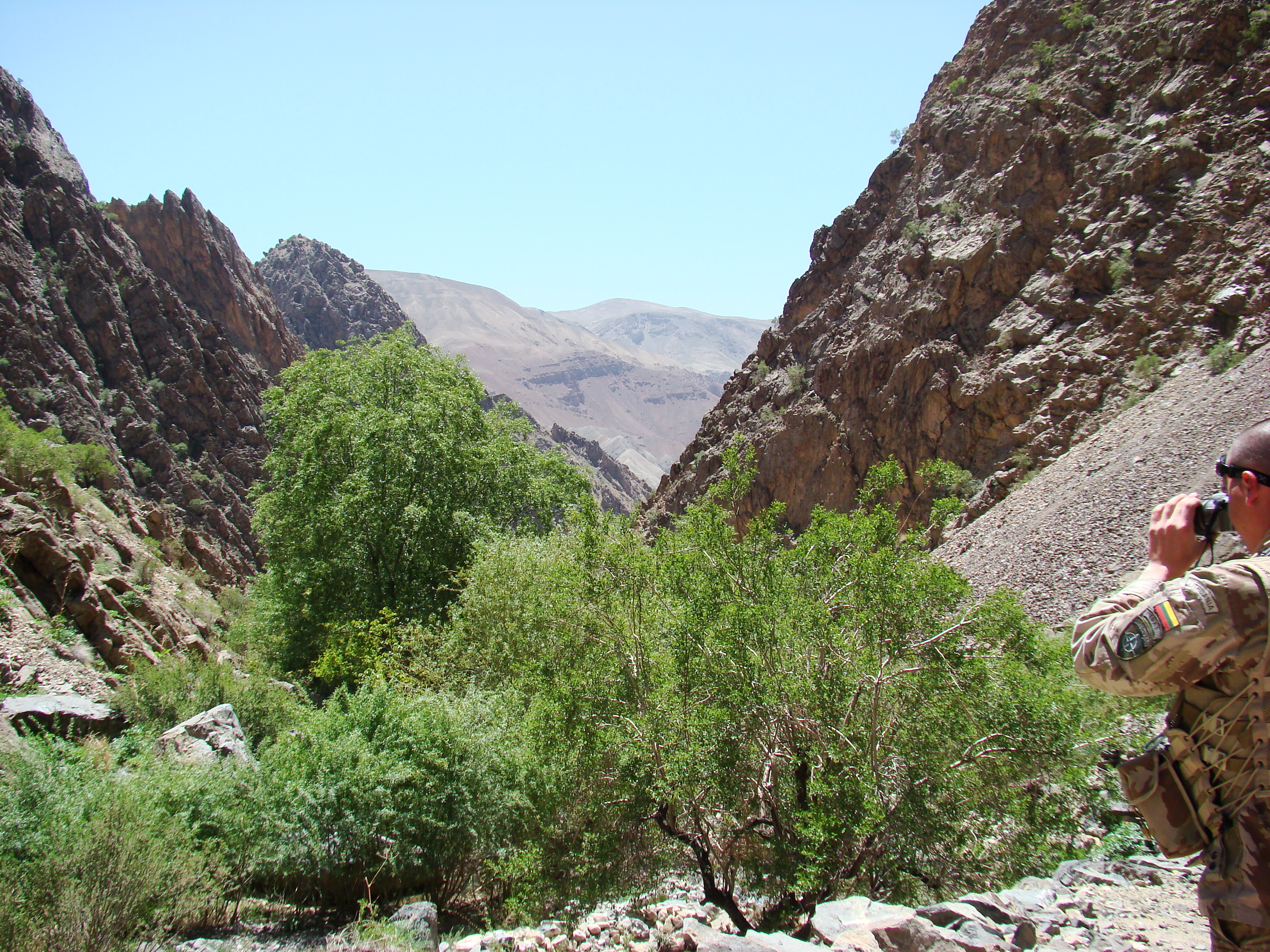
- From the top, Minaret of Jam, Chaghar Sadeh District, Ghor Valley.

- Map of Afghanistan with Ghor highlighted
- Coordinates (Capital): 34°N 65°E
- Country: Afghanistan
- Capital: Chaghcharan

Government
  - Governor: Hayatullah Mubarak
  - Deputy Governor: Maulvi Shams Ullah Tariqat
  - Police Chief: Hanif Abada

Area
  - Total: 36,657.42 km^{2} (14,153.51 sq mi)

Population (2021)
  - Total: 777,882
  - Density: 21.2203/km^{2} (54.9604/sq mi)
- Time zone: UTC+4:30
- Postal code: 32XX
- ISO 3166 code: AF-GHO
- Main languages: Dari, Pashto

Ghōr (Pashto, (Note: Pashto pronunciation: [ɣor]) Dari: (Note: Dari pronunciation: [ɣoːɾ]) غور) also known as Ghowr or Ghur, is one of the 34 provinces of Afghanistan. It is located in the western Hindu Kush in central Afghanistan, towards the northwest. The province contains eleven districts, encompassing hundreds of villages, and approximately 764,472 settled people. Firuzkoh (known as “Chaghcharan” until 2014) is the capital of the province.

== Etymology ==
The ancient Indo-European, Sogdian gor-/gur- ("mountain"-) is well preserved in all Slavic gor-/gór- (goor-/gur-), e.g.: Gorals, Goran, Goranci, Góra, Gora..., in Iranian languages, e.g.: Gorani language, Guran (Kurdish tribe). The Polish notation using gór- ("ó" stands for a sound between English "oo" and "u") instead of the popular gur- or ghur- preserves the ancient orthography.

== History ==
Mandesh is the historical name by which the mountain region of Ghor was called.

Beginning in 725, the Umayyad governor Asad b. 'Abdallah al-Qasri unsuccessfully raided the region of Ghur.

The inhabitants of Ghor had completely embraced Islam during the Ghurids era. Before the 12th century, the region was home to Buddhists, Zoroastrians, Hindus and a small number of Jews. Remains of the oldest settlements discovered by Lithuanian archaeologists in 2007 and 2008 in Ghor date back to 5000 BC. Ruins of a few castles and other defense fortifications were also discovered in the environs of Chaghcharan. A Buddhist monastery hand-carved on the bluff of the river Harirud existed in the first centuries during the prevalence of Buddhism. The artificial caves revealed testimony of the daily life of the Buddhist monks.

The rise to power of the Ghurids at Ghur, a small isolated area located in the mountain vastness between the Ghaznavid Empire and the Seljukids, was an unusual and unexpected development. The area was so remote that until the 11th century, it had remained a pagan enclave surrounded by Muslim principalities. It was converted to Islam in the early part of the 12th century after Mahmud raided it, and left teachers to instruct the Ghurids in the precepts of Islam. Even then it is believed that paganism, i.e. a variety of Mahayana Buddhism persisted in the area till the end of the century.

Various scholars and historians such as John McLeod attribute the conversion of the Ghauris to Islam to Mahmud Ghazni after his conquest of Ghor.

Traditional Muslim historians such as Estakhri and Ibn Haukal attest to the existence of the non-Islamic enclave of Ghor before the time of Ghazni, which is attributed to converting its population to Islam.

Ghor: Also called Ghoristan. The mountainous country between Hirat and Ghazni. According to Istakhri and Ibn Haukal, it was a rugged mountainous country, bounded by the districts of Hirat, Farrah, Dawar, Rabat, Kirwan, and Gharjistan back to Hirat, which were all Muslim countries. Ghor itself was a country of infidels, containing only a few Musulmans, and the inhabitants spoke a language different from that of Khurasan.

Minhaju-S-Siraj recorded strife between the non-Muslim and Muslim populations:

It is said that Amir Suri was a great king and most of the territories of Ghor were in his possession. But as most of the inhabitants of Ghor of High and low degrees had not yet embraced Islam, there was constant strife among them. The Saffarians came from Nimroz to Bust and Dawar, Yakub Lais overpowered Lak-Lak, who was the chief of Takinabad, in the country of Rukhaj. The Georgians sought the safety in Sara-sang and dwelt there in security but even among them hostilities constantly prevailed between the Muslim and the Non-Muslims. One castle was at war with another castle, and their feuds were unceasing; but owing to the inaccessibility of the mountains of Rasiat, which are in Ghor no foreigner was able to overcome them, and Shansbani Amir Suri was the head of all the Madness.

According to Minhahu-S Siraj, Amir Suri was captured by Mahmud of Ghazni, made prisoner along with his son, and taken to Ghazni, where Amir Suri died.

The region had previously been conquered by Mahmud of Ghazni, and the population converted to Islam.

It was also the last stronghold of an ancient religion professed by the inhabitants when all their neighbors had become Muslim. In the 11th century AD Mahmud of Ghazni defeated the prince of Ghor Ibn–I-Suri, and made him prisoner in a severely contested engagement in the valley of Ahingaran. Ibn-I-Suri is identified a Buddhist by the author, who has recorded his overthrow.

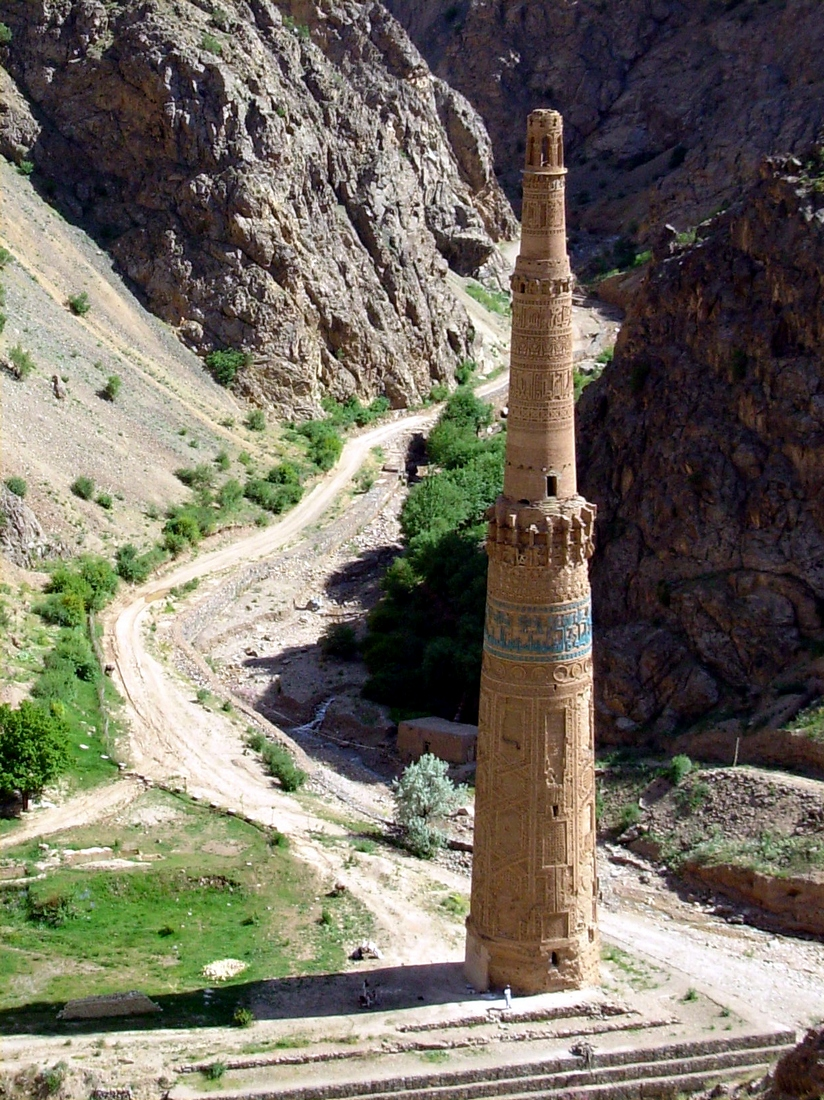
The Minaret of Jam built by the Ghurid dynasty

In 1011, 1015 and 1020, both Mahmud and Mas'ud I led expeditions into Ghur and established Islam in place of indigenous paganism. After this, Ghur was considered a vassal state of the Ghaznavid empire. During the reign of 'Abd ar Rashi and the usurper Toghrul, Ghur and Gharchistan gained autonomy.

Ghor was also the center of the Ghurid dynasty in the 12th and 13th centuries. The remains of their capital Firozkoh, which was sacked and destroyed by the Mongols in 1222, includes the Minaret of Jam, a UNESCO World Heritage Site.

=== Karzai and Ghani administrations ===
In June 2004, hundreds of troops of Abdul Salaam Khan, who had rejected the Afghan government's plan to disarm regional militias, attacked Chaghcharan and took over the city in an afternoon-long siege. Eighteen people were killed or wounded in the fighting, at which point Governor Mohammed Ibrahim fled. Three days later the Afghan government announced that it would not retake Chaghcharan. Khan and Ibrahim began negotiations soon after but reached no agreement. Khan's troops left Chaghcharan on 23 June, a day ahead of when an Afghan National Army battalion, led by Lieutenant-General Aminullah Paktiyanai, arrived with the support of roughly 20 U.S. soldiers.

=== Taliban administration (2021-present) ===
In 2021, the Taliban regained control of Ghor after the 2021 Taliban offensive.

Fifty people were killed in floods in the Ghor province in May 2024.

== Geography ==
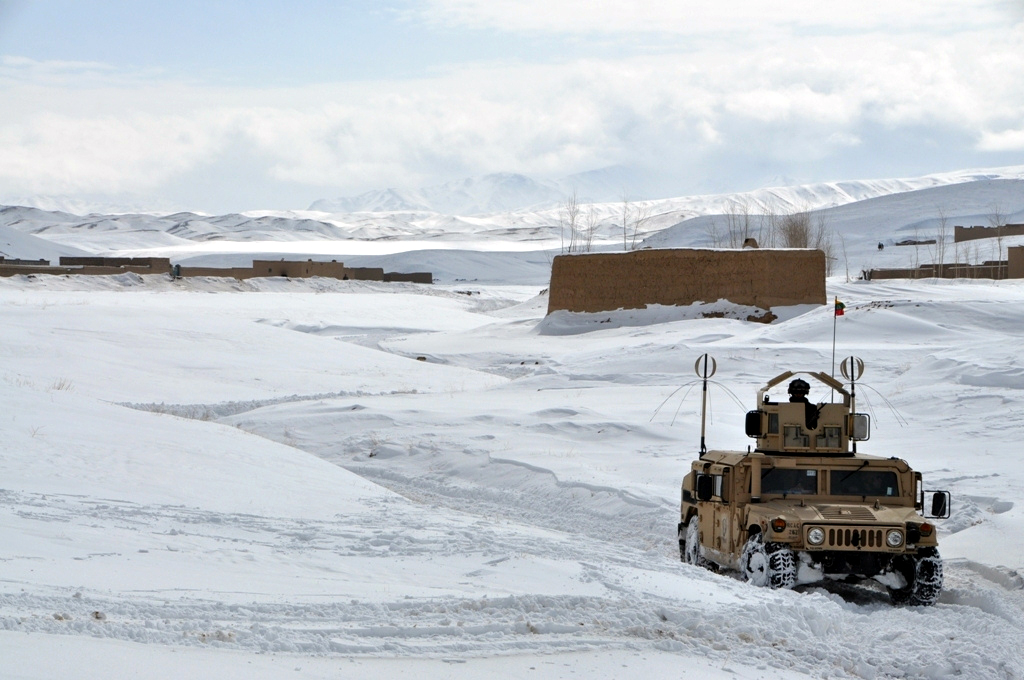
Ghor province under a deep winter in 2012.

Ghor occupies the end of the Hindu Kush mountains. Ghor is 2,500 meters above sea level and heavy snowfalls often block many of its rugged passes from November to April. It is also a drought-prone area in the summer.

== Administrative divisions ==
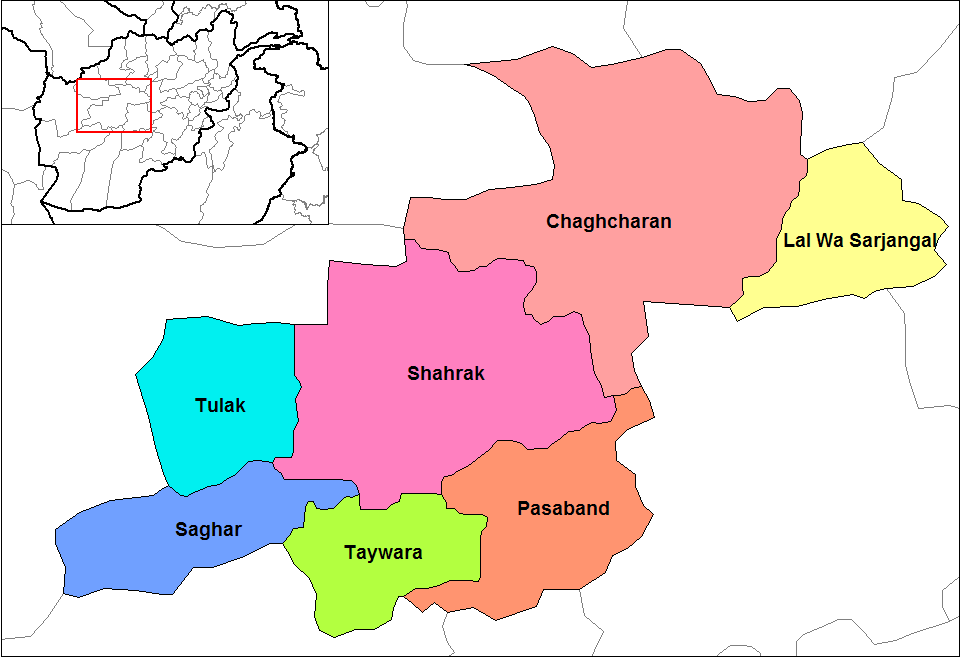
Map of the districts of Ghor as of January 2004, prior to the redrawing of provincial and district boundaries later that year

Districts of Ghor Province
District	Capital	Population	Area	Pop. density	Notes
Chaghcharan		132,537	6,870	19	96% Tajik Aimaqs, 2% Pashtuns, 2% Hazaras
Charsada		30,956	1,485	21	60% Tajik Aimaqs, 30% Hazaras, 10% Uzbeks
Dawlat Yar		36,934	1,686	22	Predominantly Hazaras, few Tajik Aimaqs
Du Layna		40,788	3,246	13	Predominantly Tajik Aimaqs
Lal wa Sarjangal		126,615	3,634	35	100% Hazaras
Marghab		21,051	2,930	7	Predominantly Hazaras
Pasaband		107,217	5,073	21	84% Tajiks, 11% Pashtuns, 5% Hazaras
Saghar		39,193	2,404	16	Predominantly Tajik Aimaqs, few Pashtuns
Shahrak		67,625	4,600	15	100% Tajik Aimaqs
Taywara	Qala-e-ghore	103,364	4,030	26	Predominantly Tajik Aimaq, few Hazaras
Tulak		58,192	2,908	20	Predominantly Tajik Aimaq, few Pashtuns and Uzbeks
Ghor		764,472	36,657	21	71.0% Farsiwan (59.2% Aimaqs, 11.8% Tajiks), 26.5% Hazaras, 2.0% Pashtuns, 0.4% Uzbeks. (Note: Note: "Predominantely" or "dominated" is interpreted as 99%, "majority" as 70%, "mixed" as 1/(number of ethnicities), "minority" as 30% and "few" or "some" as 1%.)

== Economy ==
=== Agriculture ===
Agriculture and animal husbandry are the primary economic activities in Ghor Province. According to the United Nations, many young men were forced to leave the province to find work in Herat or Iran and a small percentage of the population were teachers, government officials, carpet weavers, carpenters and tailors. Over half of the population could not cover their basic needs with their level of income. Opium production had returned to the region following the Taliban's departure as locals attempted to increase their incomes by farming a more economically lucrative crop.

=== Transportation ===
As of September 2014, Chaghcharan Airport, located at the provincial capital of Chaghcharan, had regularly scheduled flights to the provinces of Kabul and Herat.

As of 2013, roads in the province remained largely undeveloped, unpaved and often lacked bridges over rivers.

== Demographics ==
=== Population ===
As of 2020, the total population of Ghor province is about 764,472.

=== Ethnicity, languages and religion ===
Western Ghor is predominantly of Tajik ethnicity while Eastern Ghor is mostly Hazara.

Estimated ethnolinguistic and -religious composition
Ethnicity	Farsiwan		Hazara	Pashtun	Uzbek	Sources
Period	Tajik	Aimaq	Hazara	Pashtun	Uzbek	Sources

2004–2021 (Islamic Republic)	≥58%		17 – 39%	1 – 3%	<1%
2020 EU	1st	3rd	2nd	–	–
2020 CSSF (Note: Demographic information is based on data from 2020.)	58%	3%	39%	1%	–
2018 UN	majority	–	17%	2 – 3%	–
2015 CP	97%			2%	∅
2015 NPS	58%		39%	3%	<1%
2011 PRT	97%			2.4% (Note: excl. 166,640 Kochi during the summer period, increasing the Pashtun population to 23.2% during that time.)	∅
2011 USA	58%	–	39%	3%	–
2009 ISW	–	>90%		–	–

Legend:
- ∅: Ethnicity mentioned in source but not quantified
- –: Ethnicity not mentioned specifically
- Source abbreviations: Empirical sources: –, Government sources: EU – European Union Agency for Asylum, PRT – Provincial Reconstruction Team of the United States government, Editorial sources: CSSF – Center for the Scientific Study of Families, ISW – Institute for the Study of War, NPS – Naval Postgraduate School, USA – United States Army.

=== Education ===
The overall literacy rate (6+ years of age) increased from 19% in 2005 to 25% in 2011. The overall net enrolment rate (6–13 years of age) increased from 28% in 2005 to 47% in 2011.

Ghor University that first established as Ghor Higher Education Institute and then promoted to Ghor University has around 500 students with a significant number of girls. There are also some Teacher Training Institutes in the Firuzkoh, Taywara and Lal districts. The number of high schools increased in last the 10 years and attendance in university entrance exams (Kankor) jumped from hundreds to thousands of students. Several agriculture and mechanical schools were also established. There is only one nursing school that trains young female high school graduates for midwifery and nursing that is part of the Ministry of Public Health and run by an NGO in association with Ghor provincial hospital.

=== Health ===
The percentage of households with clean drinking water fell from 14% in 2005 to 9% in 2011. The percentage of births attended to by a skilled birth attendant fell from 9% in 2005 to 3% in 2011.

== Sports ==
Football, volleyball, basketball, tennis, taekwondo and karate are all official sports of the province. In July 2010, the Ghor Province cricket team was founded and represent the province in domestic tournaments.

== See also ==
- Mandesh
- Hazarajat
- Provinces of Afghanistan
