= List of airports in Afghanistan =

This is a list of airports in Afghanistan, grouped by type and sorted by location.

== Description ==
Afghanistan has five international airport in different cities and provinces of the country. They are primarily under the control of the Ministry of Transport and Civil Aviation, with security being provided by the Afghan National Police. The Kabul International Airport serves the population of Kabul and the surrounding provinces; the Mawlana Jalaluddin Mohammad Balkhi International Airport in Mazar-i-Sharif serves northern Afghanistan; the Ahmad Shah Baba International Airport in Kandahar serves the southern part of the country; the Khwaja Abdullah Ansari International Airport in Herat serves the western part of the country, and Khost International Airport serves the population of eastern Afghanistan. The Afghan government is seeking to build a new international airport in the Mohammad Agha District of Logar Province.

There are also about 16 regional domestic airports which are spread over the country in various provinces, which serve the smaller, more remote areas. Some of these airports have gravelled airside facilities and operate under visual flight rules.

== Airports across Afghanistan ==
City served	Province	ICAO	IATA	Airport name	Runway	Elev. (m)
				International airports		
Kabul	Kabul	OAKB	KBL	Kabul International Airport	11/29: 3511 × 45 m, concrete	1791
Kandahar	Kandahar	OAKN	KDH	Ahmad Shah Baba International Airport	05/23: 3200 × 55 m, asphalt	1017
Mazar-i-Sharif	Balkh	OAMS	MZR	Mawlana Jalaluddin Mohammad Balkhi International Airport	06/24: 2998 × 45 m, asphalt	392
Herat	Herat	OAHR	HEA	Khwaja Abdullah Ansari International Airport	01/19: 3014 × 45 m, asphalt	1003
Khost	Khost	OAKS	KHT	Khost International Airport	06/24: 1859 × 27 m, asphalt	1151
				Major domestic airports		
Lashkargah	Helmand	OABT	BST	Bost Airport	01/19: 2302 × 30 m, asphalt	774
Farah	Farah	OAFR	FAH	Farah Airport	15/33: 1836 × 34 m, asphalt	674
Ghazni	Ghazni	OAGN	GZI	Ghazni Airport	15/33: 305 x ? m (being expanded)	2183
Jalalabad	Nangarhar	OAJL	JAA	Jalalabad Airport	13/31: 1975 × 27 m, asphalt	561
Kunduz	Kunduz	OAUZ	UND	Kunduz Airport	11/29: 1996 m x 45 m, asphalt	444
				Regional domestic airports		
Bamyan	Bamyan	OABN	BIN	Bamyan Airport (Shahid Mazari Airport)	07/25: 2200 × ? m, asphalt	2565
Chaghcharan	Ghor	OACC	CCN	Chaghcharan Airport	06/24: 2000 × 30 m, asphalt	2278
Darwaz	Badakhshan	OADZ	DAZ	Darwaz Airport	09/27: 654 × 32 m, gravel	1533
Fayzabad	Badakhshan	OAFZ	FBD	Fayzabad Airport	18/36: 1844 × 34 m, asphalt	1171
Gardez	Paktia	OAGZ	GRG	Gardez Airport	03/21: 1664 x 53, asphalt	2374
Khwahan	Badakhshan	OAHN	KWH	Khwahan Airport	??/??: 671 × ? m, gravel	980
Kuran wa Munjan	Badakhshan	OARZ	KUR	Razer Airport	08/26: 884 × 31 m, gravel	2520
Maymana	Faryab	OAMN	MMZ	Maymana Airport	14/32: 2000 × 30 m, asphalt	838
Nili	Daykundi	OANL		Nili Airport	18/36: 732 × 18 m, gravel	2233
Sardeh Band	Ghazni	OADS	SBF	Sardeh Band Airport	02/20: 2104 m, gravel	2125
Qala i Naw	Badghis	OAQN	LQN	Qala i Naw Airport (Qala Nau Airport)	04/22: 1999 × 25 m, concrete	905
Sheberghan	Jowzjan	OASG		Sheberghan Airfield	06L/24R: 2621 × 24, asphalt 06R/24L: 2115 × 30, gravel	321
Shighnan (Sheghnan)	Badakhshan	OASN	SGA	Sheghnan Airport	16/34: 803 × 30 m, gravel	2042
Taloqan	Takhar	OATQ	TQN	Taloqan Airport	16/34: 1574 × 35 m, gravel	816
Tarinkot (Tarin Kowt)	Urozgan	OATN	TII	Tarinkot Airport	12/30: 2225 × 27 m, concrete	1365
Zaranj	Nimruz	OAZJ	ZAJ	Zaranj Airport	16/34: 2500 × 60 m, gravel	485
Zaranj	Nimruz	OANZ		Nimruz Airport	14/32: 2740 × 45 m, asphalt	482
				Military airports		
Bagram	Parwan	OAIX	OAI	Bagram Air Base	03/21: 3602 × 46 m, concrete	1484
Girishk (Gereshk)	Helmand	OAZI	OAZ	Camp Shorabak (Camp Bastion)	01/19: 3500 × 46 m, concrete/asphalt	888
Khost	Khost	OASL	OLR	Forward Operating Base Salerno	09/27: 1219 x 27 m, asphalt	1168
Lashkargah (Bost)	Helmand	OADY	DWR	Dwyer Airport	05/23: 2439 × 36 m, concrete	737
Qalat	Zabul	OAQA		Qalat Airport	02/20: 1501 x 34, gravel	1641
Shindand	Herat	OASD	OAH	Shindand Air Base	18/36: 2417 × 28 m, concrete	1152
				Small local airports		
Andkhoy (Andkhoy)	Faryab	OAAK		Andkhoy Airport	07/25: 756 x 18, gravel	274
Ghaziabad	Nangarhar	OAGA		Ghaziabad Airport	07/25: 610 x 36, dirt	510
Ishkashim (Eshkashem)	Badakhshan	OAEM		Eshkashem Airport	14/32: 896 x 21, asphalt	2620
Muqur	Ghazni	OAMK		Muqur Airport	03/21: 1265 x 35, grass	2012
Panjab	Bamyan	OAPJ		Panjab Airport	03/21: 366 x 23, gravel	2682
Sharana	Paktika	OASA	OAS	Sharana Airstrip	14/32: 1300 x 19, asphalt	2266
Taywara	Ghor	OATW		Taywara Airport	18/36: 582 x 44, grass	2246
Urgun	Paktika	OAOG	URN	Urgun Airport	?	2225
Khas Uruzgan	Urozgan	OARG	URZ	Uruzgan Airport	?	2050
Jaghori	Ghazni	?	?	Jaghori Airport	gravel	?
Yangi Qaleh	Takhar	OAYQ		Yangi Qaleh Airport	03/21: 610 x 35, grass	810
Yawan	Badakhshan	OAYW		Yawan Airport	05/23: 567 x 28, grass	1721

== See also ==
- Transport in Afghanistan
- List of airports by ICAO code: O#OA - Afghanistan
- Wikipedia:WikiProject Aviation/Airline destination lists: Asia#Afghanistan
