= Tarinkot Airport =

Tarinkot Airport Pashto: ترينکوټ هوايي ډګر
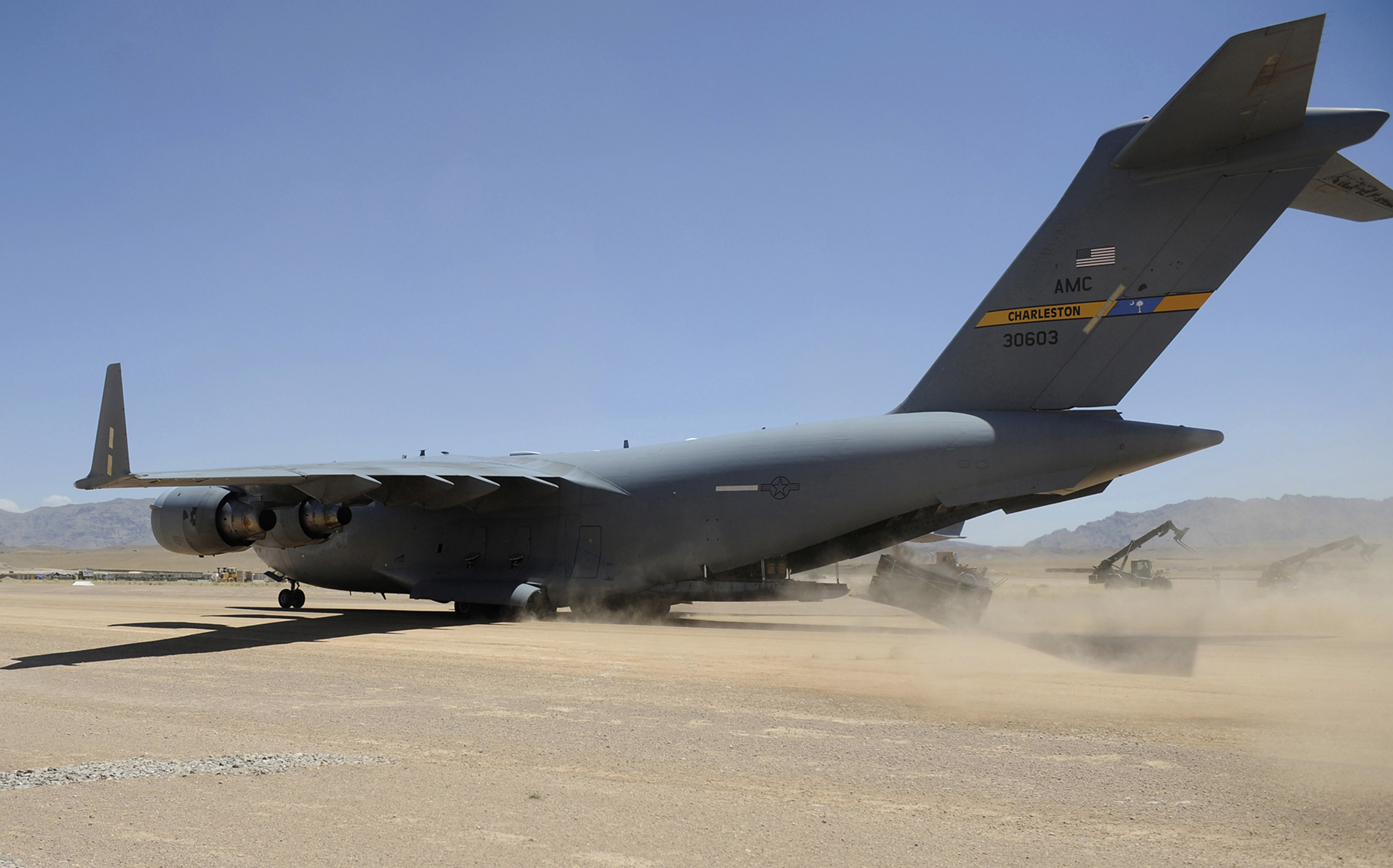
- An American C-17 Globemaster III off-loading equipment before the airport's runway was concreted (June 20, 2009)
- IATA: TII; ICAO: OATN

Summary
- Airport type: Public / Military
- Owner: Afghanistan
- Operator: Ministry of Transport and Civil Aviation; Ministry of Defense
- Serves: Uruzgan Province
- Location: Tarinkot, Afghanistan
- Elevation AMSL: 4,429 ft (1,350 m)
- Coordinates: 32°36′17″N 65°51′56″E

Map
- Location in Afghanistan

Runways
Direction	Length		Surface
Direction	ft	m	Surface
12/30	7,300	2,225	Concrete
- Sources: Google Earth, Landings.com, MoTCA, AIP Afghanistan

Tarinkot Airport (Pashto: ترينکوټ هوايي ډګر; Dari: میدان هوایی ترین‌کوت; IATA: TII, ICAO: OATN) is located about 4 miles (6.4 km) of driving distance south from the center of Tarinkot in Afghanistan, next to the Tarinkot-Kandahar Highway. It is a domestic airport under the country's Ministry of Transport and Civil Aviation (MoTCA), and serves the population of Uruzgan Province. Security in and around the airport is provided by the Afghan National Security Forces (ANSF).

Situated at an elevation of 4,429 feet (1,350 m) above sea level, Tarinkot Airport's main runway is designated 12/30 with a concrete surface measuring approximately 7,300 by 138 feet (2,225 m × 42 m). The airport has a single-story passenger terminal and a separate 4-story control tower. The adjacent Ministry of Defence's air base has several heliports, aircraft parking areas, and various buildings used by the Afghan Armed Forces for regular military and periodic emergency relief purposes.

Other nearby major airports are Nili Airport in neighboring Daykundi Province to the north, Qalat Airport in Zabul Province to the southeast, Ahmad Shah Baba International Airport in Kandahar to the south, Bost Airport in Lashkar Gah to the southwest, and Farah Airport in Farah to the west.

== History ==
Tarinkot Airport has been expanded in recent decades, mainly by NATO's International Security Assistance Force (ISAF). The current Afghan military base, which is next to the civilian section of the airport, was recognized by ISAF as Multi National Base Tarin Kot and after the Netherlands Armed Forces' departure was used by the ANSF.

=== Former airlines and destinations ===
Airlines	Destinations
Afghan Jet International	Kabul
Bakhtar Afghan Airlines	Kabul, Khost
Kam Air	Kabul

== See also ==
- List of airports in Afghanistan
