= Bakhtar Afghan Airlines =

Afghan airline (1967–1988)

IATA	ICAO	Call sign
BM	BFO	Bakhtar
- Founded: 1967 (as Bakhtar Afghan Airlines)
- Ceased operations: 1988 (merged into Ariana Afghan Airlines)
- Operating bases: Kabul International Airport
- Headquarters: Afghanistan
- Website: https://bakhtarairline.com/

Bakhtar Afghan Airlines was an airline from Afghanistan, which offered domestic flights. The company was founded in 1967 as Bakhtar Airlines, a name it kept until 1985, when it was renamed Bakhtar Afghan Airlines by Pashtun governments. In 1985 the company absorbed Ariana Afghan Airlines and became Afghanistan's sole airline company. In 1988 the Ariana and Bakhtar brands merged.

== Destinations ==
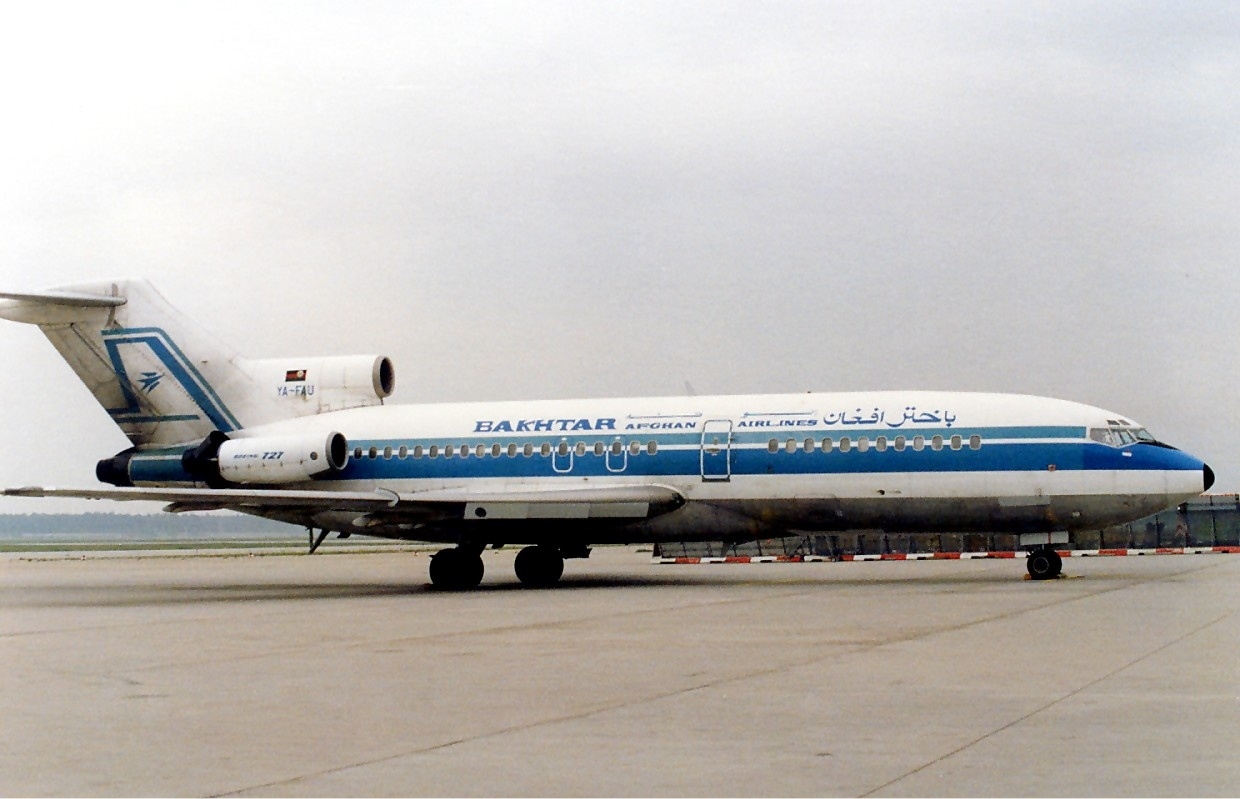
A Boeing 727 of Bakhtar Afghan Airlines at Frankfurt Airport in the late 1980s.

Bakhtar Afghan Airlines offer scheduled flights to the following destinations:

- Bamyan – Bamyan Airport
- Chaghcharan – Chaghcharan Airport
- Darwaz – Darwaz Airport
- Fayzabad – Fayzabad Airport
- Herat – Herat Airfield
- Jeddah - King Abdulaziz International Airport
- Kabul – Kabul International Airport (base)
- Kunduz – Kunduz Airport
- Khwahan – Khwahan Airport
- Maymana – Maymana Airport
- Mazar-i-Sharif – Mazar-i-Sharif Airport
- Shegnan – Sheghnan Airport

Flights were operated using Yakovlev Yak-40 or de Havilland Twin Otter aircraft.

== Accidents and incidents ==
- On 25 January 1972, a Bakhtar Yakovlev Yak-40 (registered YA-KAD) was damaged beyond repair when its hit trees during approach of Khost Airfield near the Afghan town of Khost.
- On 18 April 1973, a Bakhtar Twin Otter (registered YA-GAT) carrying 16 passengers (most of whom were American or Canadian citizens) crashed upon take-off at Bamyan Airport, killing two passengers and two of the three crew members on board.
- On 10 March 1983, a Bakhtar Twin Otter (registered YA-GAZ) operating a domestic flight from Kabul to Uruzgan crashed during a thunderstorm near the town of Ghazni, killing all 17 passengers and 2 crew members on board.
- On 8 January 1985, another Bakhtar Twin Otter (registered YA-GAY) was damaged beyond repair in a landing incident at Bamyan Airport. There were no fatalities among the 17 passengers and 3 crew members.
- On 4 September 1985 (during the Soviet–Afghan War), a Bakhtar Antonov An-26 (registered YA-BAM) was shot down by a surface-to-air missile near Kandahar. The aircraft was carrying 47 passengers and 5 crew members on a scheduled flight from Kandahar to Farah. There were no survivors.
- On 11 June 1987, another Bakhtar An-26 (registered YA-BAL) was shot down by a missile near Khost, killing 53 out of the 55 people on board. The aircraft had been on a flight from Kandahar to Kabul. Rebels had downed the aircraft, thinking that it was a military Ilyushin Il-14.

== 2020-2021 relaunch ==
Bakhtar Airlines was relaunched in 2020 for domestic flights. The new company operates a single Boeing 737-500 leased from Ariana Afghan Airlines.
