= Darwaz Airport =

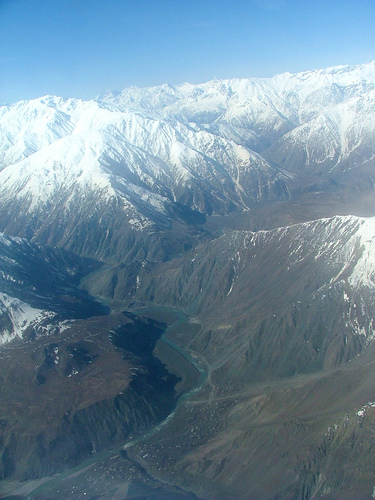
- Darwaz Airport is on top of the short mountain (in the lower left)
- IATA: DAZ; ICAO: OADZ

Summary
- Airport type: Private
- Serves: Darwaz-Kevran
- Location: Darwaz, Afghanistan
- Elevation AMSL: 5,066 ft / 1,544 m
- Coordinates: 38°27′39″N 070°53′04″E

Map
- Location of Darwaz Airport in Afghanistan

Runways
Direction	Length		Surface
Direction	m	ft	Surface
09/27	654	2,145	Gravel
- Sources: Google Earth, Landings.com, motca.gov.af

Darwaz Airport (IATA: DAZ, ICAO: OADZ) is located next to the Panj River in Darwaz, which is the capital of Darwaz District in Badakhshan Province of Afghanistan. Situated at an elevation of 5,066 feet (1,544 m) above sea level, the airfield has a gravel runway measuring around 2,145 by 100 feet (654 m × 30 m). The name Darwaz is Persian and refers to an entry or a gateway.

Darwaz Airport is believed to be for private use, but may also be used for emergency relief purposes by government agencies. On the other side of the Panj River is the village of Kevran in neighboring Tajikistan.

The other nearest airports to Darwaz are Sheghnan Airport in the Shighnan District to the southeast, Yawan Airport in the Yawan District to the south, and Khwahan Airport in the Khwahan District to the southwest.

== See also ==
- List of airports in Afghanistan
