= Razer Airport =

- IATA: KUR; ICAO: OARZ

Summary
- Airport type: Public
- Operator: Ministry of Transport and Civil Aviation (Afghanistan)
- Serves: Razer
- Location: Afghanistan
- Elevation AMSL: 8,269 ft / 2,520 m
- Coordinates: 36°1′2.0″N 70°45′39.2″E

Map
- Location of Razer Airport in Afghanistan

Runways
Direction	Length		Surface
Direction	m	ft	Surface
08/26	869	2,850	DIRT
- Source: Landings.com

Razer Airport (IATA: KUR, ICAO: OARZ) is a public use airport serving Koran va Monjan, Badakhshan, Afghanistan.

== See also ==
- List of airports in Afghanistan
