= Afghan Jet International =

Afghan regional airline

Afghan Jet International Airlines
IATA	ICAO	Call sign
HN	AJA	AFGHAN JET
- Founded: 2013
- Commenced operations: April 12, 2014
- Ceased operations: June 15, 2016
- Operating bases: Hamid Karzai International Airport
- Fleet size: 1
- Destinations: 6
- Headquarters: Kabul, Afghanistan
- Key people: Seyed Salman Sadad (President)
- Website: www.flyaji.com

Afghan Jet International Airlines (Pashto: افغان جیټ انټرنیشنل ایرلاینز) was a regional airline based in Afghanistan; it was headquartered in Kabul and based at Hamid Karzai International Airport. It offered service to five airports, all in Afghanistan. On June 15, 2016, Afghan Jet ceased operations.

== Destinations ==
Afghan Jet International served the following destinations as of August 2014:

City	Country	Airport
Chaghcharan	Afghanistan	Chaghcharan Airport
Herat	Afghanistan	Herat International Airport
Lashkar Gah	Afghanistan	Bost Airport
Kabul	Afghanistan	Hamid Karzai International Airport base
Kandahar	Afghanistan	Kandahar International Airport
Tarinkot	Afghanistan	Tarinkot Airport

== Fleet ==
The Afghan Jet International fleet consisted of the following aircraft (as of August 2016):

Its single aircraft was parked at Maastricht Aachen Airport for maintenance when the airline ceased operations. The aircraft remained parked there, until being auctioned off in 2025 to pay for the storage costs.

Afghan Jet International Fleet
Aircraft	In Fleet	Orders	Passengers	Notes
Bombardier CRJ-200LR	1	—	50	
Total	1	0		
