= Bamyan Airport =

Airport serving Bamyan, Afghanistan

Shahid Mazari Airport Pashto: د شهید مزاري هوایی ډګر Dari: فرودگاه شهید مزاری
- IATA: BIN; ICAO: OABN

Summary
- Airport type: Public
- Owner: Afghanistan
- Operator: Ministry of Transport and Civil Aviation
- Serves: Bamyan Province
- Location: Bamyan, Afghanistan
- Elevation AMSL: 8.415 ft (2.565 m)
- Coordinates: 34°48′36″N 67°49′14″E

Map
- Location of airport in Afghanistan

Runways
Direction	Length		Surface
Direction	m	ft	Surface
07/25	2,200	7,217	Asphalt
- Source: Gyros Corporation

Bamyan Airport (IATA: BIN, ICAO: OABN), officially named Shahid Mazari Airport, is located in the city of Bamyan, which is the capital of Bamyan Province in Afghanistan. It is a domestic airport under the country's Ministry of Transport and Civil Aviation (MoTCA), and serves the population of Bamyan Province. Security in and around the airport is provided by the Afghan National Security Forces.

The airport sits at an elevation of 8,415 feet (2,565 m) above mean sea level. It has an asphalt runway measuring 7,217 by 98 feet (2,200 m × 30 m). The airport has been expanded and improved from its previous pre-2014 condition. Its official name is in honor of Abdul Ali Mazari, the founder of the Hezbe Wahdat political party in Afghanistan.

== Airport ==
The airport sits alongside a large military base which, until April 2013, was known as Forward Operating Base Kiwibase and was home to coalition troops including USA, New Zealand, and Malaysia, as well as a detachment of police from Europe (EUPOL) and various aid agencies, and was the base of the New Zealand Provincial Reconstruction Team (NZPRT) run by New Zealand's Ministry of Foreign Affairs and Trade.

The airport is used by small fixed-wing aircraft, larger aircraft capable of short take off and landing (including C130 Hercules), and rotary-wing aircraft. A number of civilian airlines, including Embassy Air, land at Bamyan as well as various aid agencies and military forces. Coalition rotary aircraft usually land within the confines of the adjacent Kiwibase, which has a fuel farm capable of refueling aircraft.

In the past, Bamyan was a very challenging airport for landings and take-offs. The airport consisted of a long dirt-and-gravel airstrip, on which aircraft have been known to suffer punctures. Aircraft usually landed from the east regardless of wind conditions due to the high cliffs off the north-western corner. It is at an altitude of approximately 2591 m above sea level, meaning the air is much thinner and the weather more extreme than at sea level.

It is frequently closed by snow in the winter and temperatures can reach as low as −20 °C in the winter and 40 °C in the summer. It had no terminal buildings. It is approximately 2595 m long and 23 m wide and fenced by chain link fences approximately 2.5 m high. Along the length of this fence are several gates which remain open when the runway is not in use, and local residents used to cross the runway freely as a main thoroughfare from the southern part of Bamyan City to the main Bazaar. The gates were secured by NZPRT soldiers using padlocks when aircraft were due to land. The soldiers were then required to maintain a security patrol to prevent the fence being breached by inconvenienced locals who may have tried to cross in the path of aircraft, and more serious breaches to the security of the aircraft.

The runway had a slight bend in it approximately halfway down which added to the challenges faced by pilots during takeoff and landing. The bend also mean that a section of the chain link fence was incomplete on the southern side of the airfield to enable an aircraft wing to pass over a steep drop off into a gully to the south. This section was loosely and ineffectively strung with Razor Wire. Local residents frequently used this weak point to cross the runway when it was closed, only to be stuck on the northern side where the fence was mostly complete.

In 2021, Taliban soldiers captured the airport during the 2021 Taliban offensive.

== Former airlines and destinations ==
Airlines	Destinations
Bakhtar Afghan Airlines	Chaghcharan
Kam Air	Kabul, Herat

== Accidents and incidents ==
- On April 18, 1973, a de Havilland Canada DHC-6 Twin Otter 100 (YA-GAT) of Bakhtar Afghan Airlines crashed during takeoff, killing 4 of the 19 occupants (2 crew and 2 passengers). 14 of the passengers were Americans and Canadians. This was Afghanistan's first fatal airliner crash.
- On August 21, 1997, an Antonov An-32 (registration unknown) of the United Front Air Force crashed after overshooting the runway, killing all 7 occupants, including a number of anti-Taliban leaders. The plane was arriving from Mazar-I-Sharif.

== See also ==
- List of airports in Afghanistan
- Tourism in Afghanistan
