= Muqur =

Muqur may refer to:

- Muqur, Oman, a town in Oman
- Muqur District, Ghazni, a district in Ghazni Province, Afghanistan
- Muqur, Ghazni, a town in Muqur District, Ghazni
- Muqur District, Badghis, a district in Badghis Province, Afghanistan
- Mugului, the founder of Rouran tribe
