= Chak 86/6R =

Chak 86/6.R
- Village
- Location within Pakistan
- Coordinates: 30.41°N 73.40°E
- Country: Pakistan
- Province: Punjab
- District: Sahiwal
- Elevation: 167 m (548 ft)
- Time zone: UTC+5 (PST)

Chak 86/6R, also known as Rasoolabad, is a village situated in Sahiwal, Punjab district, Pakistan. It is one of the largest populated villages in that province.

Chak was developed after 1920's during British rule. It has, over the years, become more urbanized. 86/6-R is famous for the largest "Wood Market" in Asia, which is known as Lakkar Mandi. It is also famous from well-known religious personality Syed Mureed Hussain, commonly known as "Baba Mast(بابا مست)".

In the early 1930s, the village was divided into four blocks, with some remaining land set aside for agriculture. Mehar Khair Din was the most prominent personality of Chak 86/6R as owner. This village was handed over to Maher Khar Din (Lumber-dar) by British government in the early 1930s. Maher baba khair din invited families to live in village, Maher khair din along with his youngest son Maher Wali Mohammad supported maigrated families and sellttled them. Mehar wali Mohammad and his sons plays a vital role to develop this small village as a model village.

Chak has different subdivisions, including Main Village 86, Shad-man Town, Baba Must Colony, and Bashir Colony. The village was upgraded Union Council status during General Pervez Musharraf's regime, and Mehar Riaz Ul Haq was subsequently elected its first Nazim, along with Mazhar Javaid as Naib Nazim. This village is also known for its football club (friends football club 86/6R). Maher baba Asad Razzaq was nominated as a skipper of football team in 2006.
