= Ministry of Transport and Civil Aviation =

Ministry of Transport and Civil Aviation may refer to:

- Ministry of Transport and Civil Aviation (Afghanistan), the aviation regulation body in Afghanistan
- Ministry of Transport and Civil Aviation (Sri Lanka), the central government ministry of Sri Lanka responsible for transport
- Ministry of Transport and Civil Aviation (United Kingdom), in existence from 1953 to 1959, now the Department for Transport
