= KHT =

KHT or kht may refer to:

- Kernel-based Hough transform in digital image processing
- Khamti language, ISO 639-3 code
- Khost Airfield, Afghanistan, IATA code
- Közhasznú társaság, former type of community interest company in Hungary
