= Camp Marmal =

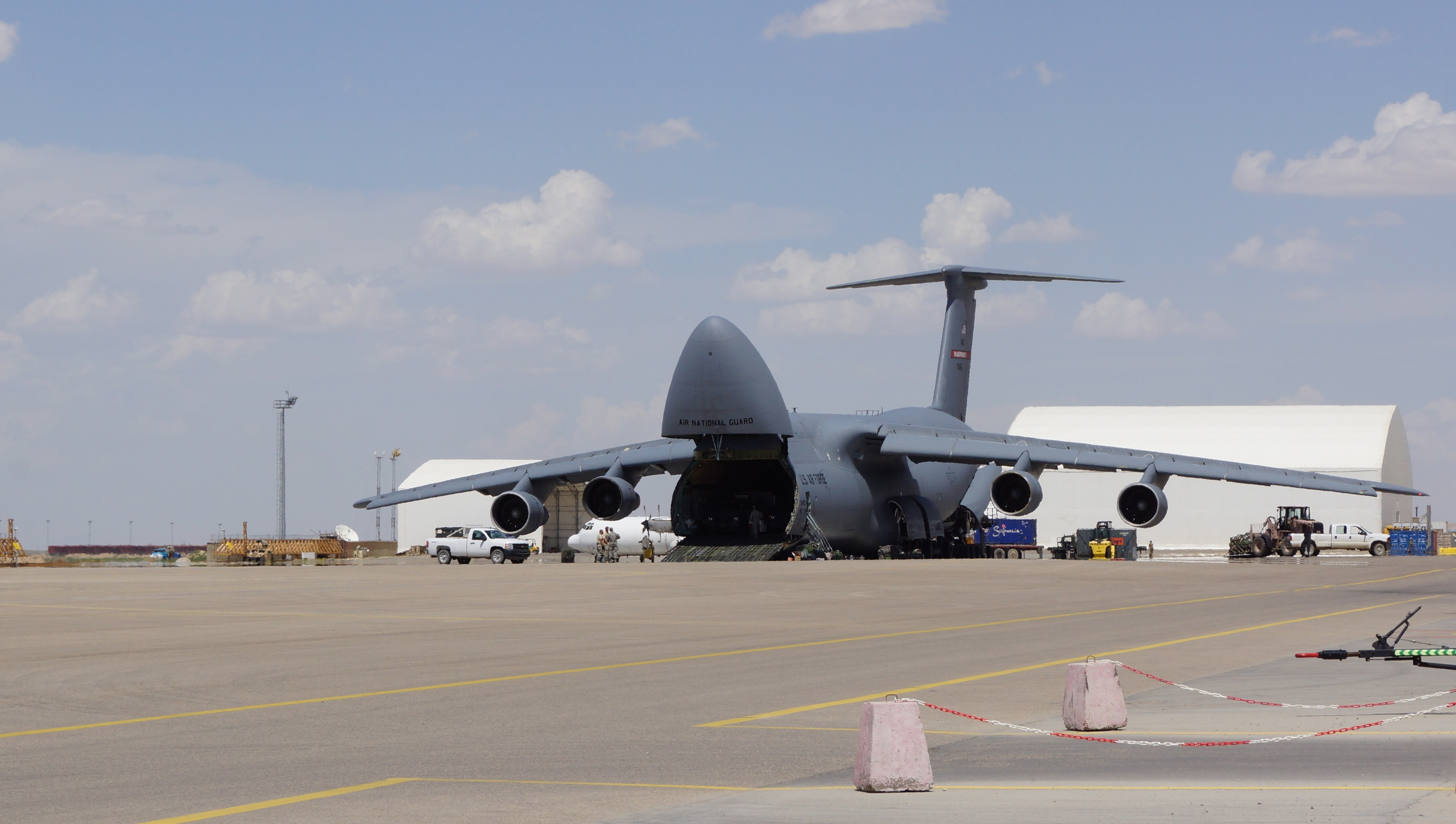
- A United States C-5 aircraft at Mazar-e-Sharif Airport, adjacent to Camp Marmal, on 22 May 2012
- IATA: none; ICAO: none

Summary
- Airport type: Military
- Owner: Islamic Emirate of Afghanistan
- Serves: Northern Afghanistan
- Location: Mazar-i-Sharif, Afghanistan
- Built: 2005
- In use: 2005-2021
- Elevation AMSL: 1,273 ft (388 m)
- Coordinates: 36°42′10″N 067°13′40″E

Map
- Location in Afghanistan

Runways
Direction	Length		Surface
Direction	ft	m	Surface
06L/24R	0	0	Asphalt
06R/24L	0	0	Asphalt

Camp Marmal was an installation of the Afghan Armed Forces. It was adjacent to Maulana Jalaluddin Balkhi International Airport in Mazar-i-Sharif, Afghanistan, at the foot of the Hindu Kush mountains. The camp was opened in September 2005. The camp gets its name from the bordering Marmal Mountains. Prior to the withdrawal of German troops, it was the largest base of the Bundeswehr outside Germany.

Camp Marmal hosted the troops of Train Advise Assist Command – North belonging to the NATO Resolute Support Mission which succeeded the International Security Assistance Force in 2014.

The base had a large medical center for the German forces, their NATO allies, and local civilians. The base supported German combat operations in Afghanistan in early 2009.

== History ==
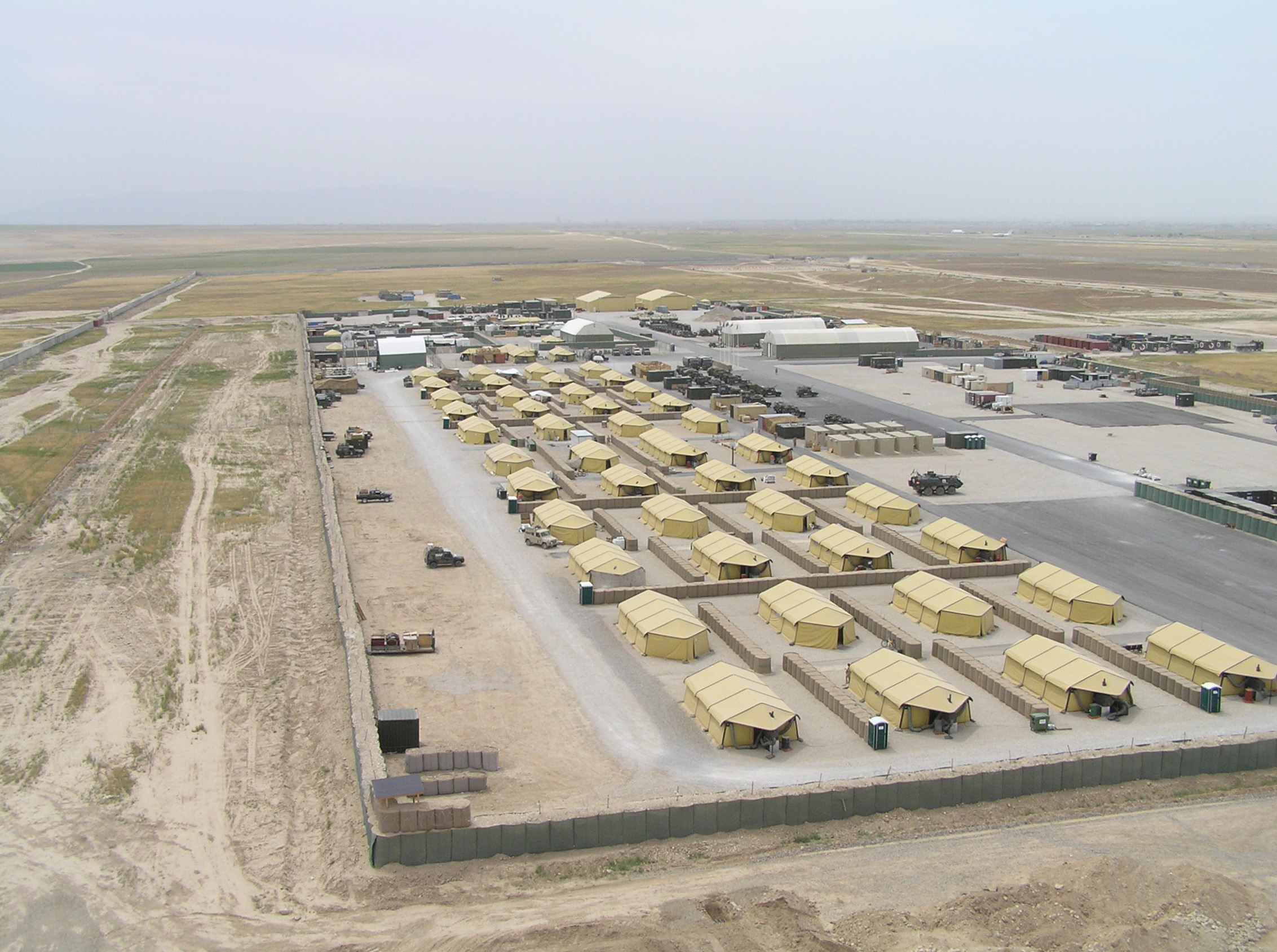
The Norwegian Camp Nidaros within Camp Marmal in 2006

Germany began building the site on 3 November 2005 and became operational on 2 August 2006.

In June 2021, the base was handed over to the Afghan Armed Forces and the last German troops left Afghanistan. On 15 August 2021, Taliban forces conquered the airbase from the Afghan Air Force during the Taliban's military offensive to take over the country.

== Hospital ==
The German military hospital was completed in 2007. Its primary purpose was to provide emergency services to the RSM troops. German civilians in Afghanistan and aid workers were also served, either under contract or in cases of emergency. Local Afghans were also cared for, as capacity and means permitted.

Along with two operating units, there were specialists, outpatient clinics, intensive and intermediate care stations. The hospital, pharmacy, and laboratory had approximately 80 military personnel.

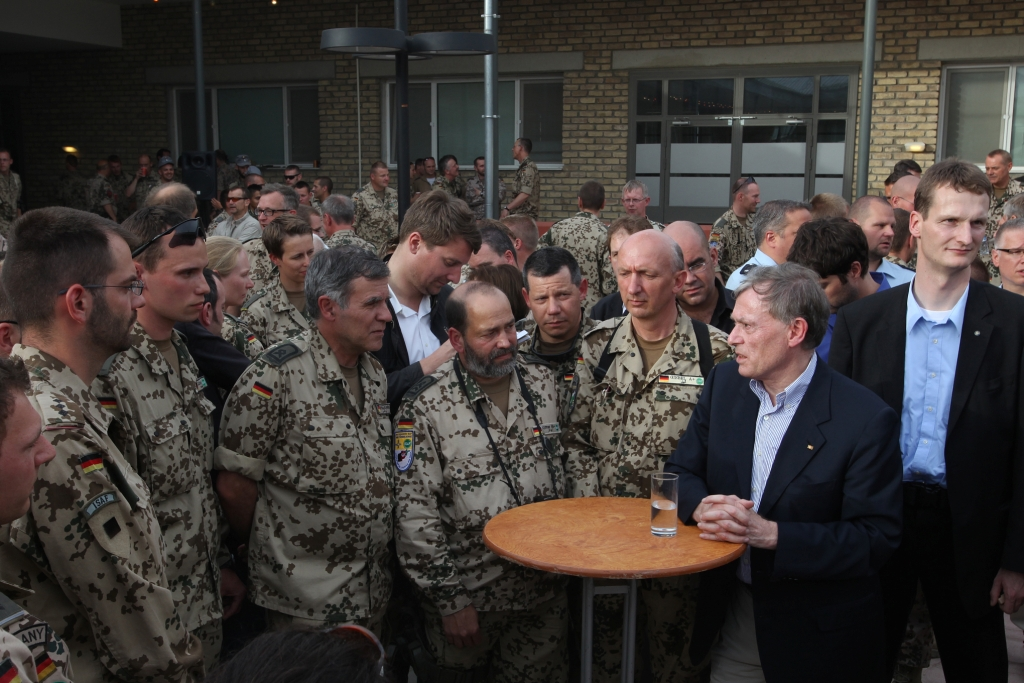
German President Horst Köhler talks with troops at Camp Marmal in 2010.

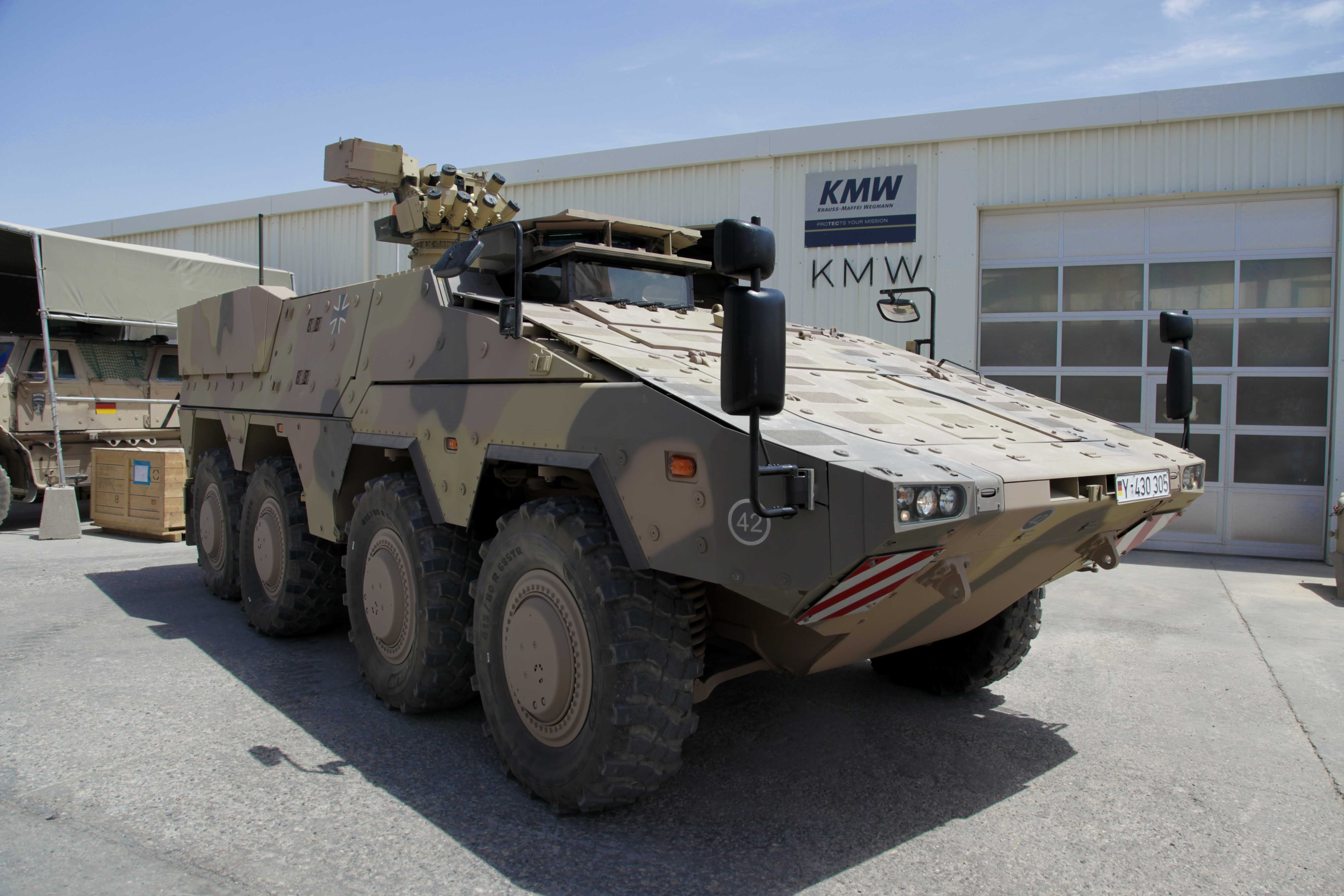
The first German Army Boxer Armored Transport Vehicles deployed to Northern Afghanistan arrive at Camp Marmal, International Security Assistance Force, Regional Command North. The Boxer is equipped with modern optics and remote-controlled weapons stations and provides improved protection to its crews.

== See also ==
- International Security Assistance Force (ISAF)
- Provincial Reconstruction Team (PRT)
- Bagram Air Base
- List of airports in Afghanistan
