= Muqur Airport =

Airport in Ghazni, Afghanistan

- IATA: none; ICAO: OAMK

Summary
- Airport type: Public
- Serves: Muqur
- Location: Afghanistan
- Elevation AMSL: 6,600 ft / 2,012 m
- Coordinates: 32°52′36.3″N 67°50′42.9″E

Map
- Location of Muqur Airport in Afghanistan

Runways
Direction	Length		Surface
Direction	m	ft	Surface
03/21	1,265	4,150	GRASS
- Source: Landings.com

Muqur Airport (ICAO: OAMK) is a public use airport located near Muqur, Ghazni, Afghanistan.

== See also ==
- List of airports in Afghanistan
