= Taywara Airport =

Airport in Ghōr, Afghanistan

- IATA: none; ICAO: OATW

Summary
- Airport type: Public
- Serves: Taywara
- Location: Afghanistan
- Elevation AMSL: 7,370 ft / 2,246 m
- Coordinates: 33°32′35.6″N 64°25′30.3″E

Map
- Location of Taywara Airport in Afghanistan

Runways
| Direction | Length | | Surface |
| Direction | m | ft | Surface |
|---|---|---|---|
| 18/36 | 582 | 1,910 | GRASS |
- Source: Landings.com

Taywara Airport (ICAO: OATW) is a public use airport located near Taywara, Ghōr, Afghanistan.

== See also ==
- List of airports in Afghanistan
