= Tarinkot District =

Tarinkot ترينکوټ
- District
- Location within Afghanistan
- Coordinates: 32°40′48″N 65°55′12″E
- Country: Afghanistan
- Province: Uruzgan Province
- Capital: Tarinkot

Population
  - Total: 100,000

U.S. Army soldier watching Afghans pass during a logistics inspection in Tarinkot.

Tarinkot District (Pashto: ترینکوټ) also spelled as Tarin Kowt, is a district of Uruzgan Province, Afghanistan. The capital of the district and the province is the town called Tarinkot, which is among the least developed populated places in the country.

In Tarinkot district, two Pashtun tribal confederations are represented, the Tareen or Tarin tribes: Popolzai, Barakzai, Alikozai, Achakzai; and the Ghilzai tribes: Tokhi, Hotak, Suleiman-Khel.

== See also ==
- Districts of Afghanistan
- Tareen
- Ghilzai or Khilji
