= Provincial Reconstruction Team Zabul =

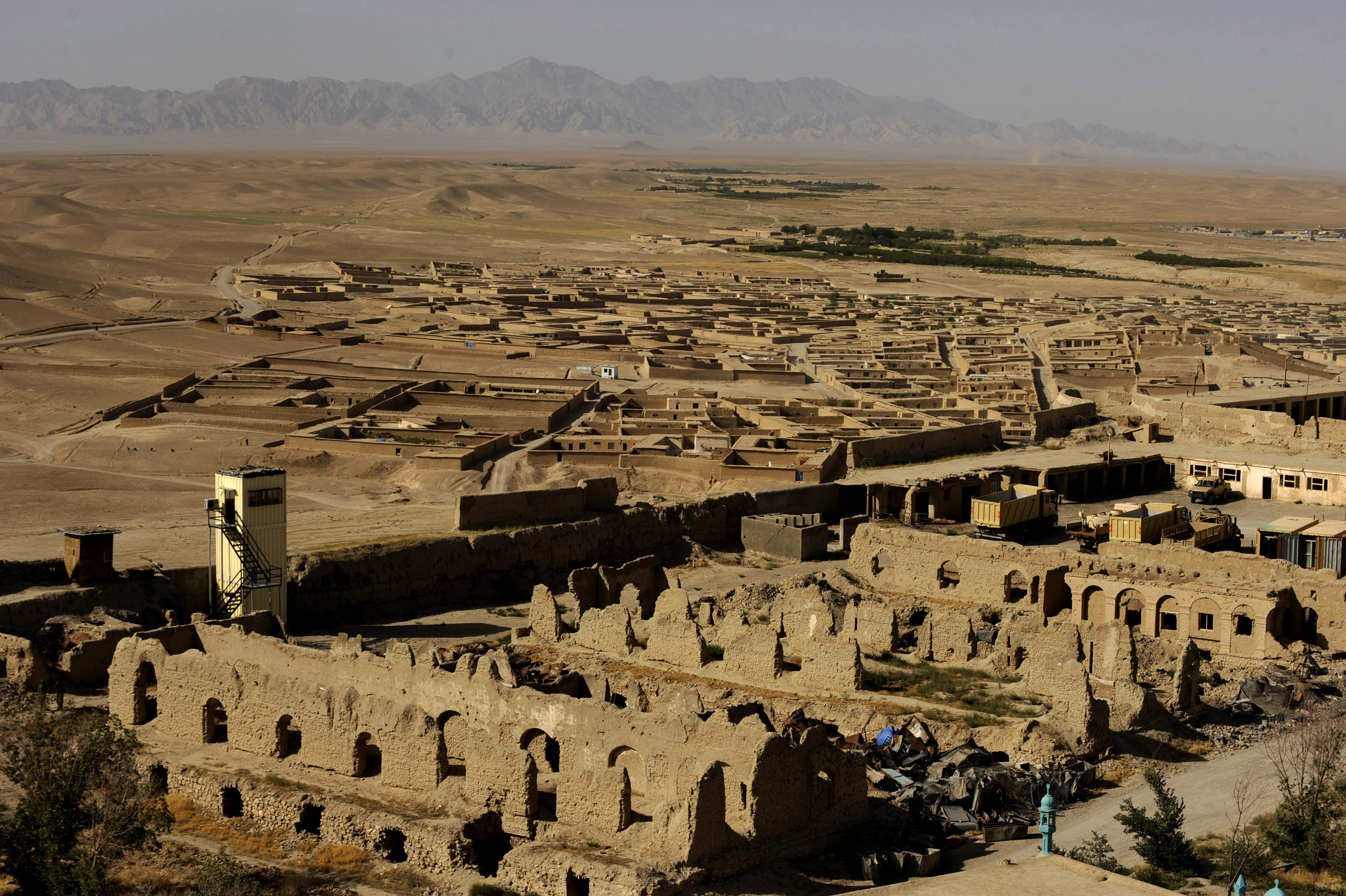
Remains of Alexander the Great's "Castle", used by Afghan National Army soldiers and U.S. soldiers and airmen assigned to Provincial Reconstruction Team Zabul, May 31, 2010.

Provincial Reconstruction Team Zabul was a civil-military unit tasked to assist the government of the Islamic Republic of Afghanistan deliver government and security in the southern province of Zabul. Along with the military component, the PRT also included civilians from the Dept. of State, USAID and Dept. of Agriculture. The team had approximately 100 personnel. The commander for PRT Zabul was an Air Force Lieutenant Colonel, but shared mission planning with the Dept. of State senior official in the province. The team was composed of half Army Soldiers and half Air Force Airmen. Soldiers served as the security force (responsible for providing outside-the-wire security for the team during convoys and ground movements), civil affairs teams and other staff positions like Director of Operations and Logistics Officer. Airmen on the team served in multiple capacities including command post, engineering, intelligence, public affairs/information operations, services, vehicle maintenance, logistics, personnel, perimeter security advisors and personal security detail.

A typical day would include a convoy movement or air movement to a construction site to assess progress. During the same day, a movement to a government office or with Afghan officials to outlying villages occurred to advise and build government capacity.

Each team would go through 2.5 months of training at Camp Atterbury, Indiana to prepare for the deployment. During the training, members of the team learned small and large movement operations, medical training, advising training, and other skills needed to operate outside the wire in Afghanistan.

== Location ==
The Zabul PRT was headquartered in the province's capital, Qalat, Zabul, next to the Provincial Governor's offices. The compound was approximately 5 acres and had a helipad. The compound was turned over to Afghan forces when the PRT was closed.

== Unit Mission ==
Conduct civil-military operations in Zabul Province to extend the reach and legitimacy of the Government of Afghanistan by:

1. Promoting good governance and justice
2. Facilitating reconstruction, development and economic growth by developing projects on the leading edge of the Afghan National Development Strategy
3. Supporting and enabling an effective Afghan security apparatus
4. Coordinating Consequence Management Operations with the Government of Afghanistan, Afghan National Security Forces and the International Security Assistance Force.

== See also ==
- Provincial Reconstruction Team
- Qalat, Zabul
