= Panjab Airport =

- IATA: none; ICAO: OAPJ

Summary
- Airport type: Public
- Serves: Panjab
- Location: Afghanistan
- Elevation AMSL: 8,800 ft / 2,682 m
- Coordinates: 34°23′31″N 067°01′15″E

Map
- Location of Panjab Airport in Afghanistan

Runways
Direction	Length		Surface
Direction	m	ft	Surface
03/21	366	1,200	Gravel
- Sources: Landings.com, motca.gov.af

Panjab Airport (ICAO: OAPJ) is a public use airport located near Panjab, Bamyan, Afghanistan.

== See also ==
- List of airports in Afghanistan
