= Uruzgan University =

University in Tarinkot, Afghanistan

- ارزګان پوهنتون
- Established: 2012
- Students: 2,500
- Location: Tarinkot, Uruzgan Province, Afghanistan
- Website: urzu.edu.af

Uruzgan University (Pashto: اروزګان پوهنتون) is a major public university in Tarinkot, which is the capital of Uruzgan Province in southern Afghanistan. The university was officially inaugurated on March 28, 2012.

Uruzgan University currently has faculties of education and agriculture. Approximately 2,500 are enrolled in the university.

== See also ==
- List of universities in Afghanistan
