= Yangi Qaleh Airport =

Airport in Afghanistan

- IATA: none; ICAO: OAYQ

Summary
- Airport type: Public
- Serves: Yangi Qaleh
- Location: Afghanistan
- Elevation AMSL: 2,657 ft / 810 m
- Coordinates: 37°27′22.0″N 69°38′27.4″E

Map
- Location of Yangi Qaleh Airport in Afghanistan

Runways
Direction	Length		Surface
Direction	m	ft	Surface
03/21	610	2,000	GRASS
- Source: Landings.com

Yangi Qaleh Airport (ICAO: OAYQ) is a public use airport located near Yangi Qaleh, Takhar, Afghanistan.

== See also ==
- List of airports in Afghanistan
