= Hamidullah Akhundzada =

Transport Minister of Afghanistan since 2021

Hamidullah Akhundzada حمیداللہ آخوندزادہ

Minister of Civil Aviation and Transport
- Incumbent
- Assumed office 7 September 2021 (Note: Acting: 7 September 2021 – 15 August 2025)
- Prime Minister: Mohammad Hassan Akhund
- Leader: Hibatullah Akhundzada

President of Ariana Afghan Airlines
- In office c. 1996 – c. 2001
- Prime Minister: Mohammed Rabbani; Abdul Kabir
- Leader: Mohammed Omar

Personal details
- Party: Taliban
- Occupation: Politician, Taliban leader

Mullah Hamidullah Akhundzada (Pashto: ملا حمید اللہ اخوندزادہ [mʊˈhamad hamɪdʊˈlɑ ɑxundzɑˈda]) is the Minister of Civil Aviation and Transport of Afghanistan. He has held the office since 7 September 2021.
