= Ghazni Airport =

Coordinates: 33.5054121388994°N 68.41404854714872°E

Ghazni Airport د غزني هوایی ډګر
- IATA: GZI; ICAO: OAGN

Summary
- Airport type: Public/Military
- Owner: Government of Afghanistan
- Operator: Ministry of Transport and Civil Aviation
- Serves: Eastern Afghanistan
- Location: Ghazni, Afghanistan
- Elevation AMSL: 7,126 ft (2,172 m)

Map
- Location of airport in Afghanistan

Runways
Direction	Length		Surface
Direction	ft	m	Surface
15/33	1,000	305	Unknown
- Sources: motca.gov.af, Great Circle Mapper, Landings.com

Ghazni Airport (Pashto: د غزني هوایی ډګر; Dari: فرودگاه غزنی; IATA: GZI, ICAO: OAGN) is located in Ghazni, Afghanistan, next to the main Ghazni-Kandahar Highway. It serves the population of Ghazni and other nearby Afghan provinces. The airport is mainly used for civilian flights and is still being developed as of late 2013.

== History ==
It was formerly a military airfield until the Afghan government recently decided to turn it into an international airport. It currently has one runway designated 15/33 with a length of 1,000 feet (305 m).

The government plans to add two runways in the near future. The overall project is expected to be completed in 2014. The first phase of the project was inaugurated in late December 2013 after a smaller private aircraft landed at the runway of Ghazni Airport.

== See also ==
- List of airports in Afghanistan
