= Sultan Hamid Sultan =

Afghan politician

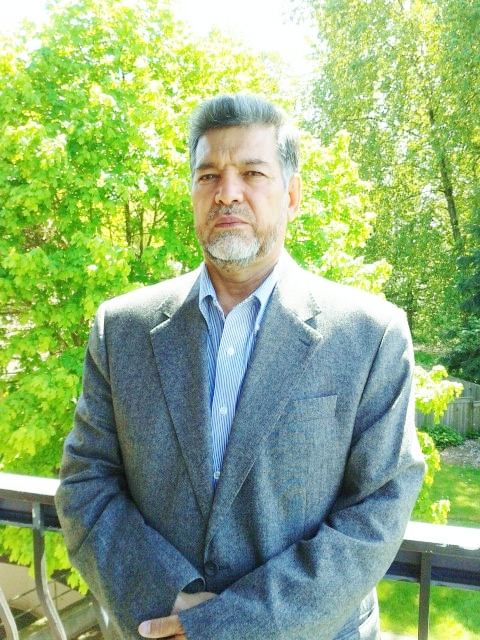
- Language: Dari

Sultan Hamid Sultan is an Afghan scholar, professor and politician. He was the Transportation Minister of the transitional government in Afghanistan. After leaving the ministry, he returned to teaching at a university in Iran.

== Biography ==
Sultan Hamid Sultan was born in 1948 in Kabul, Afghanistan. He studied at the Kabul University. Then he received a scholarship in Iran. After the fall of the Taliban in Afghanistan, he became the transportation Minister.
