= Taywara District =

Taywara تیوره
- District
- Location within Afghanistan
- Coordinates: 33°31′08″N 64°25′55″E
- Country: Afghanistan
- Province: Ghor
- Center: Taywara
- Elevation: 2,150 m (7,050 ft)

Population (2012)
  - Total: 88,900

Taywara (Teyvareh) district is located in the southern part of Ghor province in Afghanistan. The population is 88,900 people. The district center is the town of Taywara.

The district has 400 km (250 mi) of gravel roads. The terrain is mountainous and in the winter the roads are often inaccessible.
