= 1985 Bakhtar Afghan Airlines Antonov An-26 shootdown =

Aircraft crash near Kandahar, Afghanistan

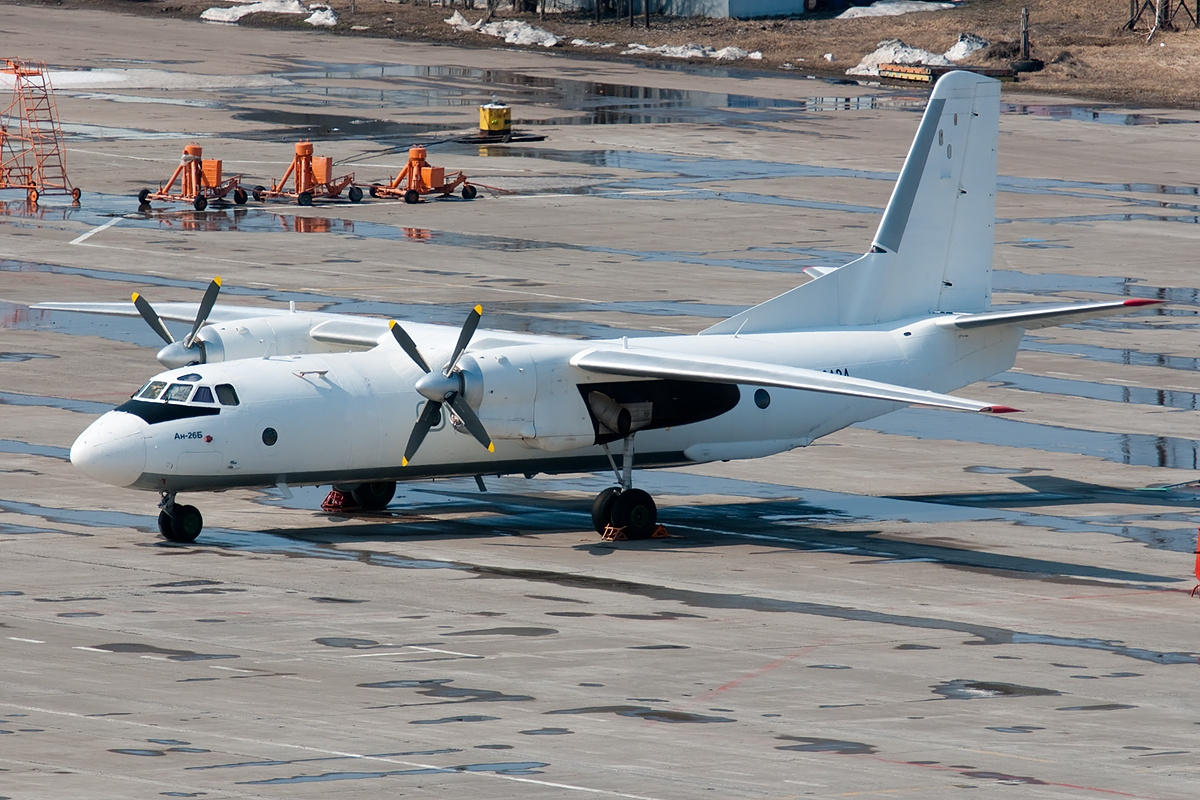
- An An-26B similar to the accident aircraft

Incident
- Date: 4 September 1985
- Summary: Shot down while en route
- Site: Afghanistan

Aircraft
- Aircraft type: Antonov An-26
- Operator: Bakhtar Afghan Airlines
- Registration: YA-BAM
- Flight origin: Kandahar Airport, Kandahar, Afghanistan
- Destination: Farah Airport, Farah, Afghanistan
- Passengers: 47
- Crew: 5
- Fatalities: 52
- Survivors: 0

1985 Bakhtar Afghan Airlines Antonov An-26 shootdown was on 4 September 1985 when a Bakhtar Afghan Airlines Antonov An-26 (registered in Afghanistan as YA-BAM) on a scheduled internal flight from Kandahar to Farah was shot down by a surface-to-air missile. The aircraft had departed from Kandahar Airport and had circled twice close to the airport to gain height and then set course for Farah Airport, it was at a height of 3800 meters and 18.5 km west of Kandahar when it was shot down and destroyed by a surface-to-air missile (SAM) fired from Hezb-e Islami Gulbuddin. All five crew and 47 passengers were killed.

== Aircraft ==
The aircraft was an Antonov An-26 twin-engined turboprop airliner that had been built in the Soviet Union.

== See also ==
- 1987 Bakhtar Afghan Airlines Antonov An-26 shootdown
