= Eshkashem Airport =

- IATA: none; ICAO: OAEM

Summary
- Airport type: Public
- Serves: Eshkashem
- Location: Afghanistan
- Elevation AMSL: 8,596 ft / 2,620 m
- Coordinates: 36°43′55.2″N 71°35′48.7″E

Map
- Location of Eshkashem Airport in Afghanistan

Runways
Direction	Length		Surface
Direction	m	ft	Surface
14/32	896	2,940	ASPHALT
- Source: Landings.com

Eshkashem Airport (ICAO: OAEM) is a public use airport located near Ishkashim, Badakhshan, Afghanistan.

== See also ==
- List of airports in Afghanistan
