= Yawan Airport =

- IATA: none; ICAO: OAYW

Summary
- Airport type: Public
- Serves: Yawan District
- Location: Afghanistan
- Elevation AMSL: 5,645 ft / 1,721 m
- Coordinates: 37°33′48.7″N 70°26′39.7″E

Map
- Location of Yawan Airport in Afghanistan

Runways
Direction	Length		Surface
Direction	m	ft	Surface
05/23	567	1,860	GRASS
- Source: Landings.com

Yawan Airport (ICAO: OAYW) is a public use airport located in the Yawan District, Badakhshan, Afghanistan.

== See also ==
- List of airports in Afghanistan
