= Sharana Airstrip =

Sharana Airstrip د شرنی هوائی ډګر
- IATA: OAS; ICAO: OASA

Summary
- Airport type: Public
- Serves: Sharana, Paktika Province
- Location: Afghanistan
- Elevation AMSL: 7,435 ft / 2,266 m
- Coordinates: 33°07′33″N 068°50′19″E

Map
- Location of Sharana Airstrip in Afghanistan

Runways
Direction	Length		Surface
Direction	m	ft	Surface
14/32	1,300	4,265	Asphalt
- Sources: Landings.com, AIP Afghanistan

Sharana Air Base (IATA: OAS, ICAO: OASA) is a public use airport located near Sharana, Paktika, Afghanistan.

== Airlines and destinations ==
Currently there are no airlines operating at Sharana Air Base.

== See also ==
- List of airports in Afghanistan
