= Panjab District, Afghanistan =

Panjab پنجاب
- District
- Location within Afghanistan
- Coordinates: 34°23′00″N 67°01′00″E
- Country: Afghanistan
- Province: Bamyan
- Capital: Panjab

Government
  - Governor: Rustam Ali
- Elevation: 2,700 m (8,900 ft)

Population (2020)
  - Total: 98,200
- Time zone: GMT+04:30 Kabul

Panjab (Dari: پنجاب) district is in the central part of Bamiyan Province, Afghanistan. The capital is the town of Panjab. Panjab contains 5 valleys (Darai Sia, Darai Nargis, Darai Mahretuspus, Darai Ghurguri and Darai Taquab-Barg), the water running through the 5 valleys meet in the centre of the district. Its population is entirely the Hazara people.

At 2,700 metres above sea level it has the highest altitude in the province, the city of Panjab is located 298 km from the capital Kabul - however travel is difficult especially in winter - the journey takes 14 hours. Two rival parties, Pazdar and Hezb-e-Wahdat, dominate the district and have divided the district between them - there has been fighting between them.

== See also ==
- Panjab, Afghanistan
- Bamiyan Province
