= Muqur District, Ghazni =

Muqur مقر
- District
- Location within Afghanistan
- Coordinates: 32°53′16″N 67°54′06″E
- Country: Afghanistan
- Province: Ghazni
- Capital: Muqur

Population (2002)
  - Total: 70,900

Muqur also spelt Moqur (Pashto: مُقُر) is a district in the southwest of Ghazni province, Afghanistan. Its population was estimated at 70,900 in 2002, of whom 19,538 were children under 12.

On 8 May 2016, a vehicular accident on a stretch of the Kabul-Kandahar Highway occurred in the district, killing 73. Two buses travelling from Kabul to Kandahar collided with a fuel tanker. The stretch of highway in this district is reportedly dangerous due to Taliban presence, and the vehicles were speeding to avoid ambush.

== Divisions ==
The district is divided in four main areas:

- Khoband
- Khodzaie
- Gadakhel
- Manger Khel

== Agriculture ==
Main crops include wheat, alfalfa, peas, beans and honey melons. Animal husbandry includes sheep, goats, domestic poultry and a limited number of donkeys and horses.
