= Qalati Ghilji =

Qalat قلات
- City
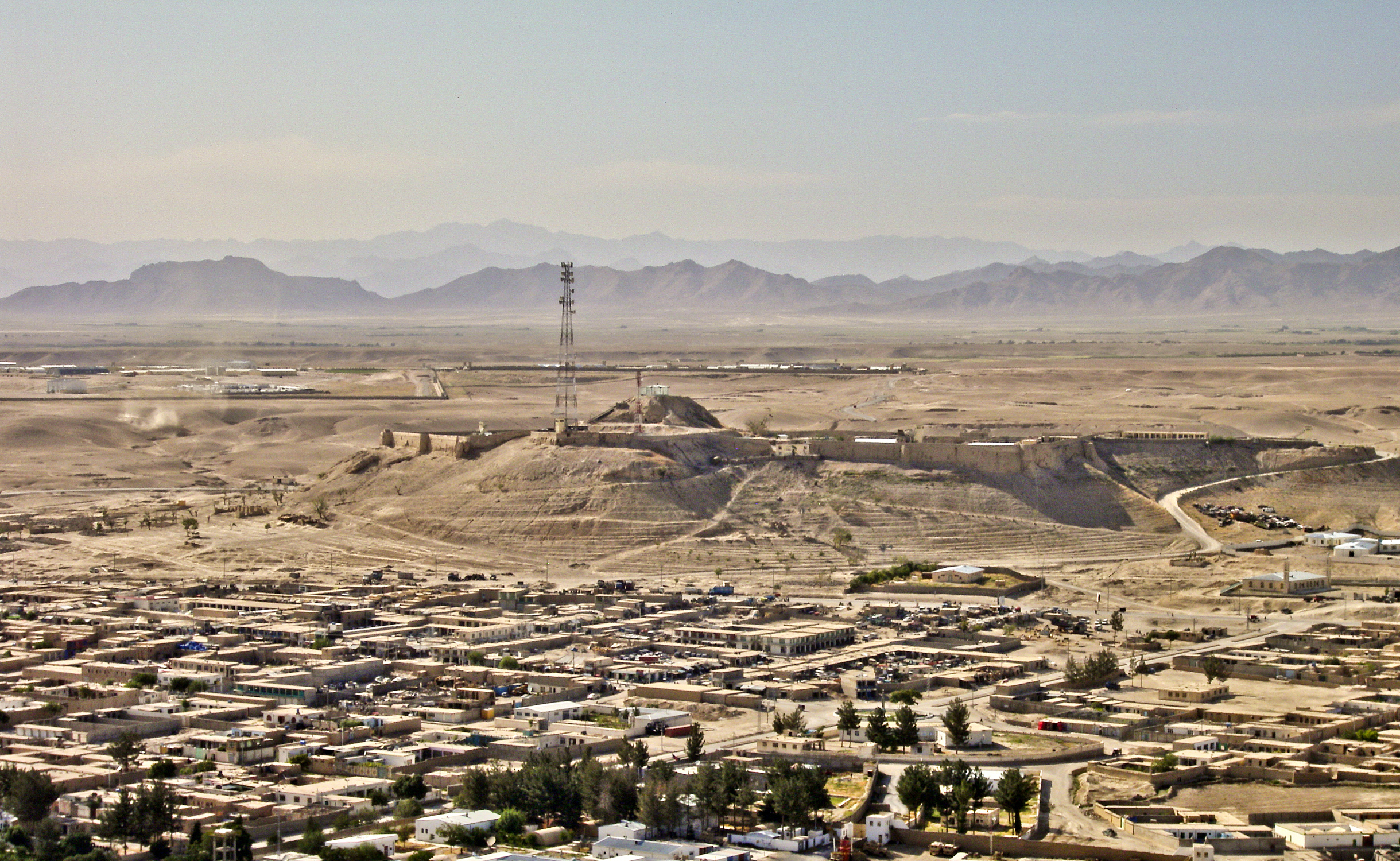
- The historical citadel in Qalat

- Location in Afghanistan
- Coordinates: 32°6′22″N 66°54′25″E
- Country: Afghanistan
- Province: Zabul Province
- District: Qalat

Government
  - Type: Municipality
- Elevation: 5,090 ft (1,550 m)

Population (2015)
  - Urban: 49,158
  - Metro: 9,900
- Time zone: UTC+04:30 (Afghanistan Time)

Qalat, (Note: Pashto: قلات Pashto pronunciation: [ka.lɑt̪] Dari: قلات Dari pronunciation: [qä.lɑ́ːt̪]) also known as Kalat, and historically referred to as Qalāti Khaljī, and Qalat-i Ghilzai, is a city in southern Afghanistan that serves as the capital of Zabul Province. It is linked by Highway 1 with Kandahar to the southwest and Ghazni to the northeast. The city had 5,462 dwellings in 2014, with an estimated population of approximately 49,158 people. Qalat is divided by at least 4 police districts (nahias) with land area of 4,820 hectares.

Barren land is the dominant land use classification 59% of total land. While built-up land use only accounts for 19% of total land use, within that classification there is a large proportion of institutional land (33%). Qalat also has two distinct industrial areas in Districts 2 and 3.

Qalat is historically associated with the Khalaj (later known as the Khalji or Ghilji) tribe, a Turkic group that settled in the region of present-day southern Afghanistan, including the areas around Qalat, Zabul, and Ghazni, during the early medieval period. From this region, the Khalji later migrated toward the Indian subcontinent, where they rose to political and military prominence. The city is homeland of Alauddin Khalji, a ruler of the Delhi Sultanate of Khalji origin and one of its most powerful and influential sultans, who ruled from 1296 to 1316.

The Qalat Airport is located a couple of miles to north of the city. Next to the airport is the compound of the former Provincial Reconstruction Team Zabul, which was built by the United States. On 13 August 2021, the Taliban officially took control of Qalat, becoming the seventeenth provincial capital to be captured as part of the wider 2021 Taliban offensive.

== History ==
In medieval times, the area was within the heartland of the Khalaj tribe. The Khalji dynasty of India originated from this city. transforming into the Ghilji tribe of Pashtuns.

It was successfully defended by Captain John Halket Craigie and a sepoy garrison against the Afghans in the First Anglo-Afghan War of 1842, and a special medal was awarded to every member of the garison. A political mission came through the city April 16, 1857, en route to Kandahar to broker a new treaty of friendship between the British government at Peshawar and the Amir of Kabul. The party was greeted by a group sent out by the heir-apparent to welcome them and check on the party's supplies. Two companies of infantry were formed so the British could inspect the troops. Afterwards, a shura was held.

Sher Ali Khan captured the city on January 22, 1867. In the battle, he lost a son, Mahmud Ali, killed in single combat by his uncle. His uncle was subsequently killed.

=== 21st century ===
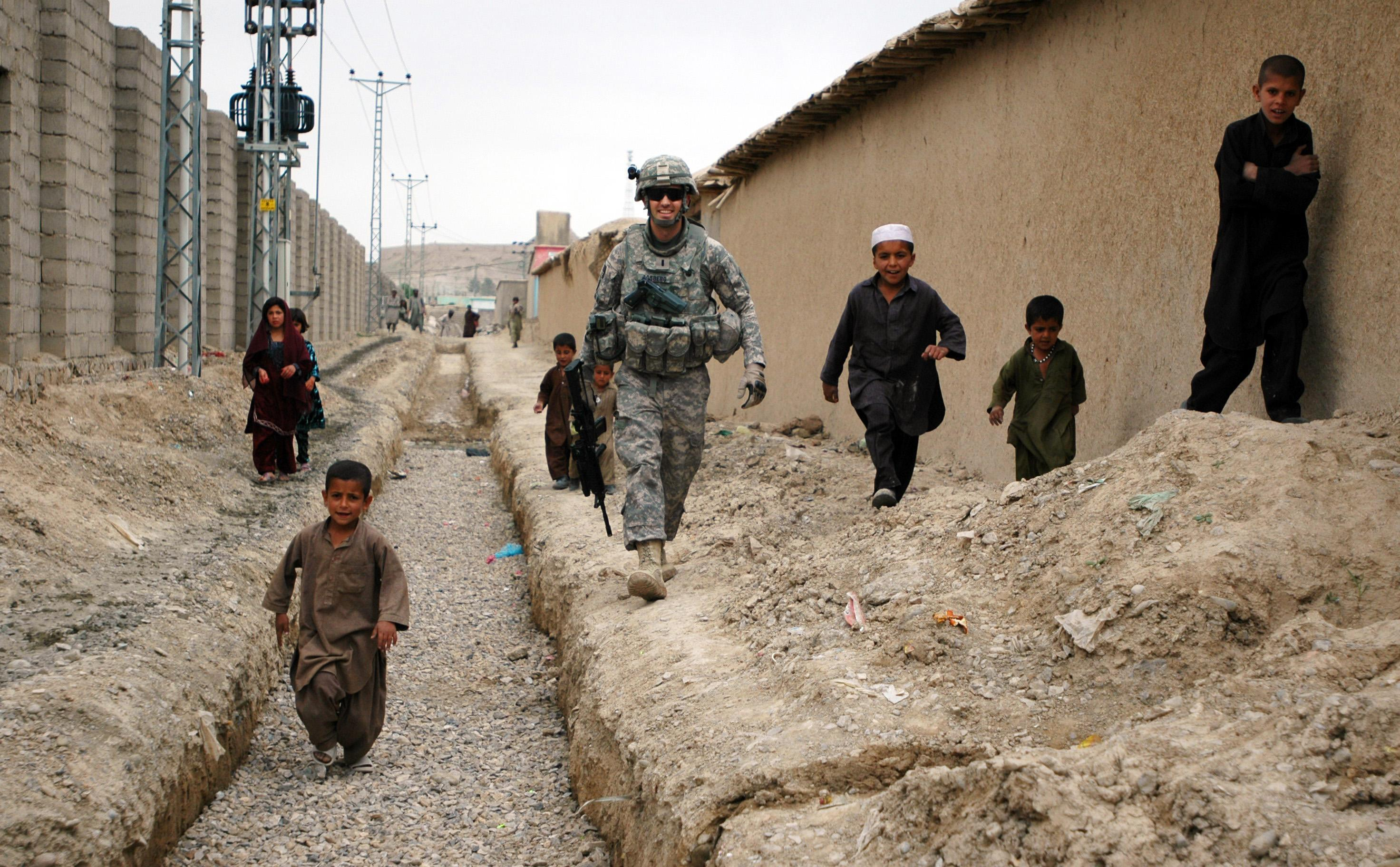
American soldier walking with local children during a survey of a street drainage project in 2011

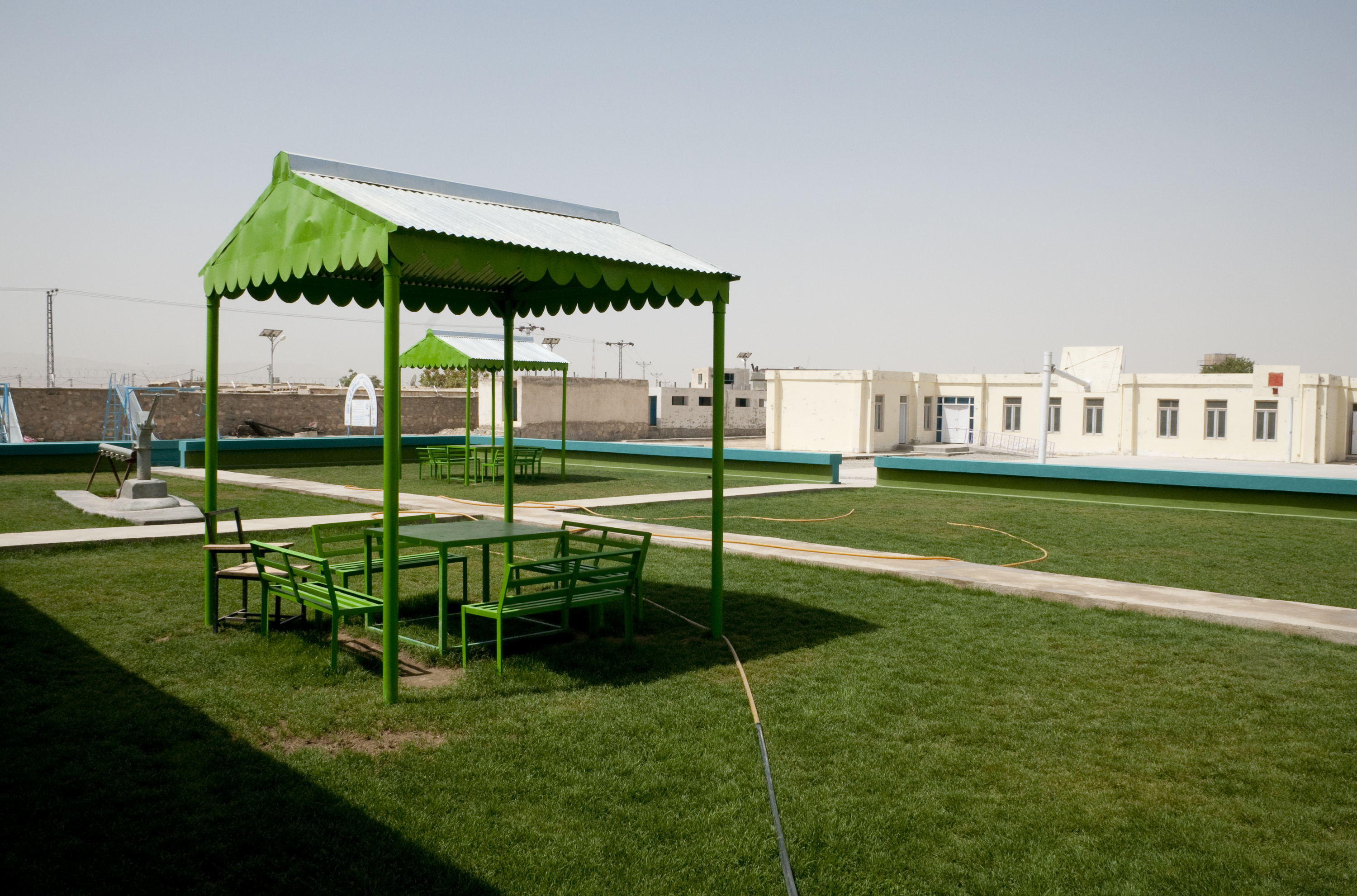
Bibi Khala School

In an effort to bring economic development to the area, Zabul province's first airstrip was built just outside the city in 2006. It is a dirt runway. The first flight brought in supplies for Provincial Reconstruction Team Zabul and other organizations trying to rebuild the area. Three years later, a girls school was built to attempt to improve education in the area. An initial school supply and prayer mat donation was made, and regular book drops and school supply donations were made until the PRT left in 2013. Clean water programs around the city improved the availability of clean water sources. In 2009, efforts were completed to improve the water system at the old Qalat City Hospital to bring clean drinking water to patients there.

Not all the reconstruction efforts were successful, however. In 2006, construction began on a new economic district for the city. Meant to be an area of commerce and development, ten million dollars and three years later, most of the buildings are unoccupied, unusable either due to lack of the skills to maintain the buildings or due to a lack of need for the building. The governor of Zabul refused to move into the new house, citing the lack of security.

Anne Smedinghoff, a 25-year-old American diplomat, was killed by a suicide car inside the city in the spring of 2013.

== Climate ==
Qalat features a semi-arid climate (BSk) under the Köppen climate classification. The average temperature in Qalat is 13.6 °C, while the annual precipitation averages 283 mm.

July is the hottest month of the year with an average temperature of 27.5 °C. The coldest month January has an average temperature of -2.9 °C.

Climate data for Qalati Ghilji, elevation 1,565 m (5,135 ft)
Month	Jan	Feb	Mar	Apr	May	Jun	Jul	Aug	Sep	Oct	Nov	Dec	Year
Mean daily maximum °C (°F)	9.3 (48.7)	11.1 (52.0)	17.3 (63.1)	26.0 (78.8)	31.2 (88.2)	36.7 (98.1)	38.4 (101.1)	37.4 (99.3)	32.9 (91.2)	26.5 (79.7)	18.3 (64.9)	12.8 (55.0)	24.8 (76.7)
Mean daily minimum °C (°F)	−2.5 (27.5)	−1.0 (30.2)	3.7 (38.7)	9.0 (48.2)	12.6 (54.7)	16.7 (62.1)	18.6 (65.5)	17.0 (62.6)	10.8 (51.4)	5.5 (41.9)	0.6 (33.1)	−1.7 (28.9)	7.4 (45.4)
Average precipitation mm (inches)	31 (1.2)	113 (4.4)	65 (2.6)	27 (1.1)	1 (0.0)	0 (0)	0 (0)	0 (0)	0 (0)	2 (0.1)	20 (0.8)	44 (1.7)	303 (11.9)
Source: FAO

== Demographics ==
The population of Qalat is estimated to be around 49,158 residents, while the province has somewhere around 700,000 people.

== Economy ==
The main source of income of Qalat residents is from agriculture, trade, and transport. The Omari Dam is located about 4 km (2.5 mi) to the west of Qalat. It is one of several new check dams that were recently built to counter flooding and drought.

== Healthcare ==
The city has several hospitals and clinics. A new hospital was built in early 2025.

== Sport ==
Cricket and association football are the most popular sports in the area. The Afghanistan Cricket Board has a cricket stadium north of the city, near Qalat Airport.

== Notable sites ==
- The local skyline is dominated by a fortress constructed by the forces of Alexander the Great (see: Qalat (fortress)).
- Ghar Bolan Baba, a 730m deep cave historically used for religious purposes
