= Panjab, Afghanistan =

Panjab پنجاب
- City
- Location in Afghanistan
- Coordinates: 34°23′N 67°1′E
- Country: Afghanistan
- Province: Bamyan
- District: Panjab
- Elevation: 2,758 m (9,049 ft)

Population (2004)
  - Total: 9,900
- Time zone: UTC+4:30 (AST)

Panjab (Hazaragi: پنجاب) (meaning 'five rivers') is the capital of Panjab District, a mountainous district in the southwestern part of the Bamyan Province, Afghanistan. The town is situated at 34°23'N 67°1'E and has an altitude of 2,758 m altitude, the population was 9,900 in the year 2004. There is an airport with gravel surface.

== Climate ==
Owing to its high altitude, Panjab has a humid continental climate (Dsb) that borders on a subarctic climate (Dsc) under the Köppen climate classification. It has mild, dry summers and cold, snowy winters. The annual precipitation averages 333 millimetres (13.1 in).

The average temperature in Panjab is 4.4 °C (39.9 °F). July is the warmest month of the year with an average temperature of 15.7 °C (60.3 °F). The coldest month January has an average temperature of −8.7 °C (16.3 °F).

Climate data for Panjab, Bamyan Province
| Month | Jan | Feb | Mar | Apr | May | Jun | Jul | Aug | Sep | Oct | Nov | Dec | Year |
|---|---|---|---|---|---|---|---|---|---|---|---|---|---|
| Mean daily maximum °C (°F) | −2.5 (27.5) | −1.3 (29.7) | 4.5 (40.1) | 12.0 (53.6) | 16.5 (61.7) | 21.3 (70.3) | 23.9 (75.0) | 23.5 (74.3) | 19.5 (67.1) | 13.4 (56.1) | 7.1 (44.8) | 1.6 (34.9) | 11.6 (52.9) |
| Daily mean °C (°F) | −8.7 (16.3) | −7.1 (19.2) | −1.1 (30.0) | 5.7 (42.3) | 9.3 (48.7) | 13.3 (55.9) | 15.7 (60.3) | 14.8 (58.6) | 10.2 (50.4) | 5.0 (41.0) | −0.3 (31.5) | −4.6 (23.7) | 4.4 (39.8) |
| Mean daily minimum °C (°F) | −14.9 (5.2) | −12.9 (8.8) | −6.7 (19.9) | −0.6 (30.9) | 2.2 (36.0) | 5.3 (41.5) | 7.5 (45.5) | 6.2 (43.2) | 0.9 (33.6) | −3.4 (25.9) | −7.7 (18.1) | −10.8 (12.6) | −2.9 (26.8) |
| Average precipitation mm (inches) | 37 (1.5) | 49 (1.9) | 66 (2.6) | 61 (2.4) | 44 (1.7) | 9 (0.4) | 3 (0.1) | 2 (0.1) | 2 (0.1) | 8 (0.3) | 21 (0.8) | 31 (1.2) | 333 (13.1) |
Source: weather2visit.com

== See also ==
- Bamyan Province
