= Qalat Airport =

Qalat Airport Pashto: د قلات هوايي ډګر
- IATA: none; ICAO: OAQA

Summary
- Airport type: Military
- Owner: Ministry of Defense
- Operator: Afghan Armed Forces
- Serves: Zabul Province
- Location: Qalat, Afghanistan
- Elevation AMSL: 5,383 ft / 1,641 m
- Coordinates: 32°08′02″N 066°53′56″E

Map
- Location of airport in Afghanistan

Runways
Direction	Length		Surface
Direction	m	ft	Surface
02/20	1,538	5,047	Gravel
- Sources: Google Earth

Qalat Airport (Pashto: د قلات هوايي ډګر; Dari: فرودگاه قلات; ICAO: OAQA) is located less than 2.5 miles north of the center of Qalat, the capital of Zabul Province in Afghanistan. It is currently an air base used exclusively by members of the country's Ministry of Defense. Security in and around the airport is provided by the Afghan National Security Forces.

Qalat Airport is at an approximate elevation of 5,383 feet (1,641 m) above mean sea level. It has one gravel runway measuring around 5,047 by 98 feet (1,538 m × 30 m). In case it becomes a civilian domestic airport, flying could be more convenient for the residents of Zabul Province. Presently, they must drive to Kandahar in the south to use a public airport or receive travelers.

== See also ==
- List of airports in Afghanistan
