= Bost Airport =

Bost Airport د بوست هوايي ډګر
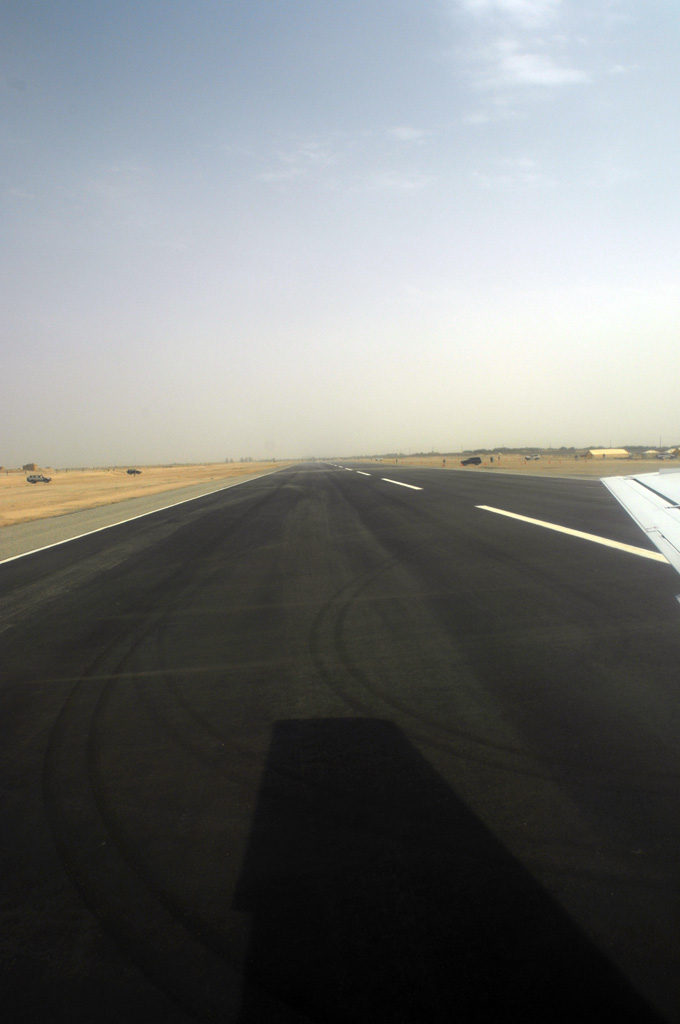
- IATA: BST; ICAO: OABT

Summary
- Airport type: Public
- Owner: Islamic Emirate of Afghanistan
- Operator: Ministry of Transport and Civil Aviation
- Location: Lashkargah, Afghanistan
- Elevation AMSL: 2,540 ft (770 m)
- Coordinates: 31°33′31.6″N 64°21′52.9″E

Map
- Location of airport in Afghanistan

Runways
Direction	Length		Surface
Direction	ft	m	Surface
01/19	7,551	2,302	Asphalt
- Sources: Landings.com

Bost Airport (Pashto: د بوست هوايي ډګر; IATA: BST, ICAO: OABT) is an airport serving Lashkargah, a city in Helmand Province in Afghanistan. It is located on the east bank of the Helmand River, 5 miles (8 km) north of its junction with the Arghandab River. It is also 75 miles (121 km) west of Kandahar.

== History ==
The airport was established in 1957 with the assistance of the United States.

In 2008, a large project commenced to rehabilitate the airport as well as to create an industrial and agricultural park. The overall budget for this project was US$52 million donated by USAID.

On 4 June 2009, the new runway and terminal were inaugurated by senior government officials and the ambassadors of the US and the UK. The new asphalt runway is 2,300m long and 43m wide which makes it the third longest runway in Afghanistan.

== Former airlines and destinations ==
Airlines	Destinations
Afghan Jet International	Kabul
Kam Air	Kabul

== Facilities ==
The airport stands at an elevation of 2,540 feet (774 m) above mean sea level. It has one runway, designated 01/19, with an asphalt surface measuring 7,549 by 100 feet (2,301 m × 30 m). The runway previously had a gravel surface measuring 6,233 by 150 feet (1,900 m × 46 m).

== See also ==
- List of airports in Afghanistan
- Camp Bastion
