= Khost International Airport =

Airport in Afghanistan

Khost International Airport Pashto: د خوست نړیوال هوایي ډګر
- IATA: KHT; ICAO: OAKS

Summary
- Airport type: Public
- Owner: Afghanistan
- Operator: Ministry of Transport and Civil Aviation
- Serves: Loya Paktia region
- Location: Khost, Afghanistan
- Elevation AMSL: 3,760 ft / 1,146 m
- Coordinates: 33°20′01″N 069°57′09″E

Map
- Location of airport in Afghanistan

Runways
Direction	Length		Surface
Direction	ft	m	Surface
06/24	8,740	2,664	Asphalt
- Sources: Ariana News; Khaama Press

Khost International Airport, also referred to as Khost Airport (Pashto: د خوست نړیوال هوایي ډګر; IATA: KHT, ICAO: OAKS), is located in the eastern section of Khost, which is the capital of Khost Province in Afghanistan. The airport is under the country's Ministry of Transport and Civil Aviation, and is used for domestic and international flights. The Ministry of Defense also uses it for emergency relief purposes such as when the June 2022 Afghanistan earthquake occurred.

The airport sits at an elevation of 1,457 ft (444 m) above sea level. It has one runway with an asphalt surface measuring 8,740 ft × 148 ft (2,664 m × 45 m). It provides air transportation to the entire Loya Paktia region.

Other nearby major airports to Khost are Kabul International Airport to the north, Nangarhar Airport to the northeast, Ahmad Shah Baba International Airport in Kandahar to the southwest, and Ghazni Airport to the west.

== Airlines and destinations ==
Airlines	Destinations
Ariana Afghan Airlines	Al Ain
Kam Air	Dubai–International, Jeddah, Kabul, Kuwait City

== History ==
During the 1980s Soviet–Afghan War, Khost Airport was occupied by the invading Soviet Union forces. It was then occupied by Americans during the 2001–2021 U.S.-led war in Afghanistan. The United States built a military base there known as Forward Operating Base Chapman.

There had been three major reported accidents, all of them during the 1980s mujahideen fighting and involved Soviet-made Antonov An-26 aircraft.

In December 2009, seven CIA employees were killed in a suicide attack at the nearby Forward Operating Base Chapman (FOB Chapman). The bomber, Humam Balawi of Jordan, wore a suicide vest and blew himself up in the base, killing the base commander, CIA agents and civilian contractors.

Work to improve and expand Khost Airport began in late 2011. Civilian passengers between Khost and Kabul were allowed to use NATO's Sehra Bagh Airport until Khost Airport was completed. It was announced that the airport will become international in the future, taking passengers to and from the United Arab Emirates.

The airport was officially inaugurated in July 2021 by then-President Ashraf Ghani, who was there to personally welcome passengers of a flight from Dubai.

In August 2021, security forces of the Islamic Emirate of Afghanistan (Taliban) took control of the airport from the NATO-trained Afghan National Security Forces (ANSF).

== See also ==
- List of airports in Afghanistan
