= Tarinkot =

City in Uruzgan, Afghanistan

Tarinkot: ترينکوټ; ترینکوت
- Provincial capital
- Location in Afghanistan
- Coordinates: 32°37′36″N 65°52′24″E
- Country: Afghanistan
- Province: Uruzgan
- District: Tarinkot

Government
  - Type: Municipality
  - Mayor: Mawlawi Abdul Rasheed Hidayatullah
- Elevation: 4,321 ft (1,317 m)

Population (2025)
  - Provincial capital: 127,095
  - Urban: 8,797
- Time zone: UTC+04:30 (Afghanistan Time)

Tarinkot or Terinkot (Note: Pashto: ترينکوټ, romanized: Tarinkoṭ, [t̪a.ɾiŋ.koʈ]; Dari: ترینکوت, romanized: Tarīnkot, [t̪ʰä.ɾíːŋ.kʰóːt̪]) is a city in south-central Afghanistan, serving as the capital of Uruzgan Province. It is within the jurisdiction of Tarinkot District and has an estimated population of 127,095 people. Majority of its residents are Pashto-speaking ethnic Pashtuns. The current mayor of the city is Mawlawi Abdul Rasheed Hidayatullah.

Tarinkot sits at 1,317 m (4,321 ft) above sea level, and is connected by a road network with Kandahar to the south, Nili in Daikundi Province to the north, and Malistan in Ghazni Province to the northeast.

The majority of land in the district is classified as non built-up (69%) of which agriculture is practiced over 67%. Residential land accounts for 47% of built-up land. The Tarinkot Airport is located within the municipal boundaries, constituting the second largest built-up land use (24%). The Uruzgan University is also located in Tarinkot.

During the August 2021 Taliban offensive, all Afghan National Security Forces under then-President Ashraf Ghani surrendered to the Taliban. Tarinkot continues to be one of the least developed populated places in the country.

== History ==
Tarinkot was historically part of the Loy Kandahar (Greater Kandahar) region. It is said that this town remained a seat of some of the Tarin (or Tareen) Pashtun tribal chiefs as early as the 12th-13th centuries AD. Some of them later migrated to the Indian subcontinent during or after the Mughal-Safavid War (1622-23). Others settled near Pishin and some in the Hazara area of what is now Khyber Pakhtunkhwa.

=== 21st century ===
On November 16, 2001, anti-Taliban groups in the area rose up against their Taliban governor, which marked the first organized Pashtun resistance against the Taliban. Hamid Karzai, then an obscure statesman, was in the region at the time trying to organize a militia while accompanied by an 11-man U.S. Special Forces team, known as Operational Detachment Alpha 574. The Taliban launched a counterattack, confronting Karzai and his militia who dug in to defend the town. With the help of U.S. air power, they drove the Taliban back from Tarinkot.

In 2004, an American base called FOB Ripley, named after U.S. Marine John Ripley was built in Tarinkot. It was established by a Joint Task Force made up mainly of the 22nd Marine Expeditionary Unit (Special Operations Capable) (22nd MEU SOC), 2-5 Infantry (bobcats)/3rd BDE/ 25th Infantry Division, US Army Civil Affairs, and the Florida and Iowa National Guard Task Force 168 in May 2004. Subsequently, other foreign military forces have operated at the base outside Tarinkot.

After the 22nd MEU SOC led Operation Mountain Storm, most of the Taliban forces moved to the mountainous region between Afghanistan and Pakistan. In August 2006, as ISAF's mission assumed responsibility for security in Afghanistan's south, Dutch troops built Kamp Holland, later becoming the Multi National Base Tarin Kot.

Beginning in March 2007, the U.S. Army Corps of Engineers (USACE) began construction of a road from Tarinkot westward to Deh Rahwod and then to Shahidi Hassas District, in the western areas of Oruzgan province. At the same time, the USACE also started paving and bridge construction to improve the road to Kandahar.

On 4 July 2010, U.S. soldiers from 1st Squadron, 2nd Stryker Cavalry Regiment assumed responsibility over operations in Tarinkot and Deh Rahwod in the wake of the Dutch withdrawal from Uruzgan.

On 27 July 2011, a young Pakistani man from the Waziristan region was captured by the Afghan National Army and ISAF forces during a raid on the house of Mullah Qasim in the Sur Marghab area near Tirinkot. The would-be bomber named Saifullah was interviewed by Pajhwok Afghan News reporter Ahmad Omaid Khpalwak. In the interview Saifullah said he and 14 other Pakistanis spent at least two months wandering around the city to select a proper time and place for an attack. "Many times we encountered foreigners, but Mullah Qasim would escape after seeing foreigners and finally we were arrested without carrying out any attack," he said.

U.S. Army soldier in June 2013 watching Afghans pass on a road in Tarinkot.

Around noon on 28 July, three suicide attackers blew up vehicles packed with explosives at the gates of government compounds while other attackers equipped with heavy weapons entered the buildings and began killing everyone inside. After the shooting ended at least 19 people were killed and 37 wounded. The dead included Pajhwok reporter Khpalwak, 10 children, 2 women and 1 member of the Afghan National Police. Khpalwak was shot 20 times.

On March 1, 2011, U.S. soldiers from 4th Battalion, 70th Armor Regiment assumed responsibility of Tarinkot and Deh Rawod. On November 23, 2011, U.S. soldiers from the 1st Reconnaissance, Surveillance and Target Acquisition Squadron, 14th Cavalry Regiment assumed responsibility over operations in Tarinkot.

In September 2016, Tarinkot was under threat by Taliban fighters. It was fully captured by them during the August 2021 Taliban offensive.

== Geography ==
Tarinkot is somewhat isolated. It sits next to two rivers with a network of various size canals that provide water to nearby farms.

== Climate ==
Tarinkot has a cold semi-arid climate (Köppen climate classification BSk) with hot summers and cool to cold winters. Precipitation is low, and mostly falls from December to March. Snow can be seen every winter.

Climate data for Tarinkot
Month	Jan	Feb	Mar	Apr	May	Jun	Jul	Aug	Sep	Oct	Nov	Dec	Year
Record high °C (°F)	18.3 (64.9)	21.7 (71.1)	29.5 (85.1)	39.3 (102.7)	38.5 (101.3)	44.5 (112.1)	43.0 (109.4)	42.8 (109.0)	37.9 (100.2)	36.6 (97.9)	28.4 (83.1)	21.6 (70.9)	44.5 (112.1)
Mean daily maximum °C (°F)	9.3 (48.7)	11.1 (52.0)	17.4 (63.3)	26.0 (78.8)	31.3 (88.3)	36.8 (98.2)	38.4 (101.1)	37.4 (99.3)	32.9 (91.2)	26.5 (79.7)	18.4 (65.1)	12.8 (55.0)	24.9 (76.7)
Daily mean °C (°F)	3.3 (37.9)	4.9 (40.8)	10.8 (51.4)	17.4 (63.3)	22.4 (72.3)	28.0 (82.4)	29.7 (85.5)	27.7 (81.9)	22.8 (73.0)	16.1 (61.0)	9.0 (48.2)	5.2 (41.4)	16.4 (61.6)
Mean daily minimum °C (°F)	−2.4 (27.7)	−1.0 (30.2)	3.8 (38.8)	9.0 (48.2)	12.7 (54.9)	16.8 (62.2)	18.6 (65.5)	17.0 (62.6)	10.9 (51.6)	5.6 (42.1)	0.7 (33.3)	−1.6 (29.1)	7.5 (45.5)
Record low °C (°F)	−20 (−4)	−11.9 (10.6)	−7.9 (17.8)	0.9 (33.6)	4.0 (39.2)	7.0 (44.6)	9.0 (48.2)	5.6 (42.1)	0.5 (32.9)	−3.8 (25.2)	−11.1 (12.0)	−15.8 (3.6)	−20 (−4)
Average precipitation mm (inches)	48.9 (1.93)	61.7 (2.43)	62.2 (2.45)	18.3 (0.72)	8.0 (0.31)	0.0 (0.0)	1.4 (0.06)	0.0 (0.0)	0.0 (0.0)	4.8 (0.19)	12.6 (0.50)	30.3 (1.19)	248.2 (9.78)
Average rainy days	7	7	9	5	2	0	0	0	0	1	2	5	38
Average snowy days	2	1	0	0	0	0	0	0	0	0	0	0	3
Average relative humidity (%)	60	58	53	44	35	25	26	29	28	33	40	56	41
Mean monthly sunshine hours	194.4	167.2	219.1	260.8	341.1	378.3	359.5	349.3	327.2	288.1	260.9	200.4	3,346.3
Source: NOAA (1972-1982)

== Demographics ==
Tarinkot has a population of approximately 127,095 people. Majority of them are Pashto-speaking ethnic Pashtuns. Neighboring ethnic groups such as Hazaras and Baloch also reside and work there. In the district, two major Pashtun tribal confederations are represented, Tareen tribes: Popalzai, Barakzai, Nurzai, Achakzai; and the Ghilzai tribes: Tokhi, Hotak.

== Economy ==
Tarinkot is the economic center of Uruzgan Province, and sits on the Kandahar-Bamyan Highway. Many of Tarinkot's residents are land and business owners. Others are involved in agriculture, transport and trade. The city is expected to see a large industrial park in the near future.

Tarinkot is connected by a road network with Kandahar to the south, Nili in Daikundi Province to the north, and Malistan in Ghazni Province to the northeast. Tarinkot Airport serves the population of the region.

== Education ==
There are a number of schools in Tarinkot. The Uruzgan University was established in 2012. It provides higher education to thousands of students.

== Sport ==
Cricket and association football are the most popular sports in the area. The city has one major multipurpose stadium.

== See also ==
- List of cities in Afghanistan
