= Taywara =

Taywara تیوره
- City
- Location in Afghanistan
- Coordinates: 33°30′36″N 64°25′12″E
- Country: Afghanistan
- Province: Ghor
- District: Taywara
- Elevation: 7,380 ft (2,250 m)

Population
  - Total: 15,000
- Time zone: UTC+4:30

Taywara (Dari: تیوره) is a town located at 33.51°N 64.42°E at about 2,250 m altitude. The population is 15,000. It is the district center of Taywara District, Ghor province, Afghanistan.

== See also ==
- List of cities in Afghanistan
