= Muqur, Ghazni =

Moqor is a district of Ghazni province of Afghanistan

Muqur مقر
- Location in Afghanistan
- Coordinates: 32.8178°N 67.7692°E
- Country: Afghanistan
- Province: Ghazni
- District: Muqur
- Elevation: 2,003 m (6,572 ft)
- Time zone: UTC+4:30

Muqur (Pashto: مُقُر) is located in the southern part of Muqur District, Afghanistan.

== See also ==
- Muqur (disambiguation)
- Ghazni Province
