= Sheghnan Airport =

Airport in Afghanistan

- IATA: SGA; ICAO: OASN

Summary
- Serves: Sheghnan, Afghanistan
- Elevation AMSL: 6,700 ft / 2,042 m
- Coordinates: 37°34′0″N 71°30′0″E

Map
- Location of airport in Afghanistan

Runways
Direction	Length		Surface
Direction	ft	m	Surface
16/34	2,635	803	Gravel
- Sources: Landings.com

Sheghnan Airport (IATA: SGA, ICAO: OASN) is located in the extreme northeast section of Afghanistan deep within Pamir mountain ranges in the Badakhshan Province of Afghanistan. The airport is close to the border with Tajikistan; to the east and parallel of the Shighnan airport is Khorog Airport in Tajikistan. These two airports are only 2,000 feet (0.6 km) apart and are separated by a river.

== Facilities ==
The airport is at an elevation of 6,700 feet (2,042 m) above mean sea level. It has one runway designated 16/34 with a gravel surface measuring 2,635 by 100 feet (803 m × 30 m).

== See also ==
- List of airports in Afghanistan
