= Yawan District =

Coordinates: 37°31′41″N 70°22′43″E

Yawan یاوان
- District
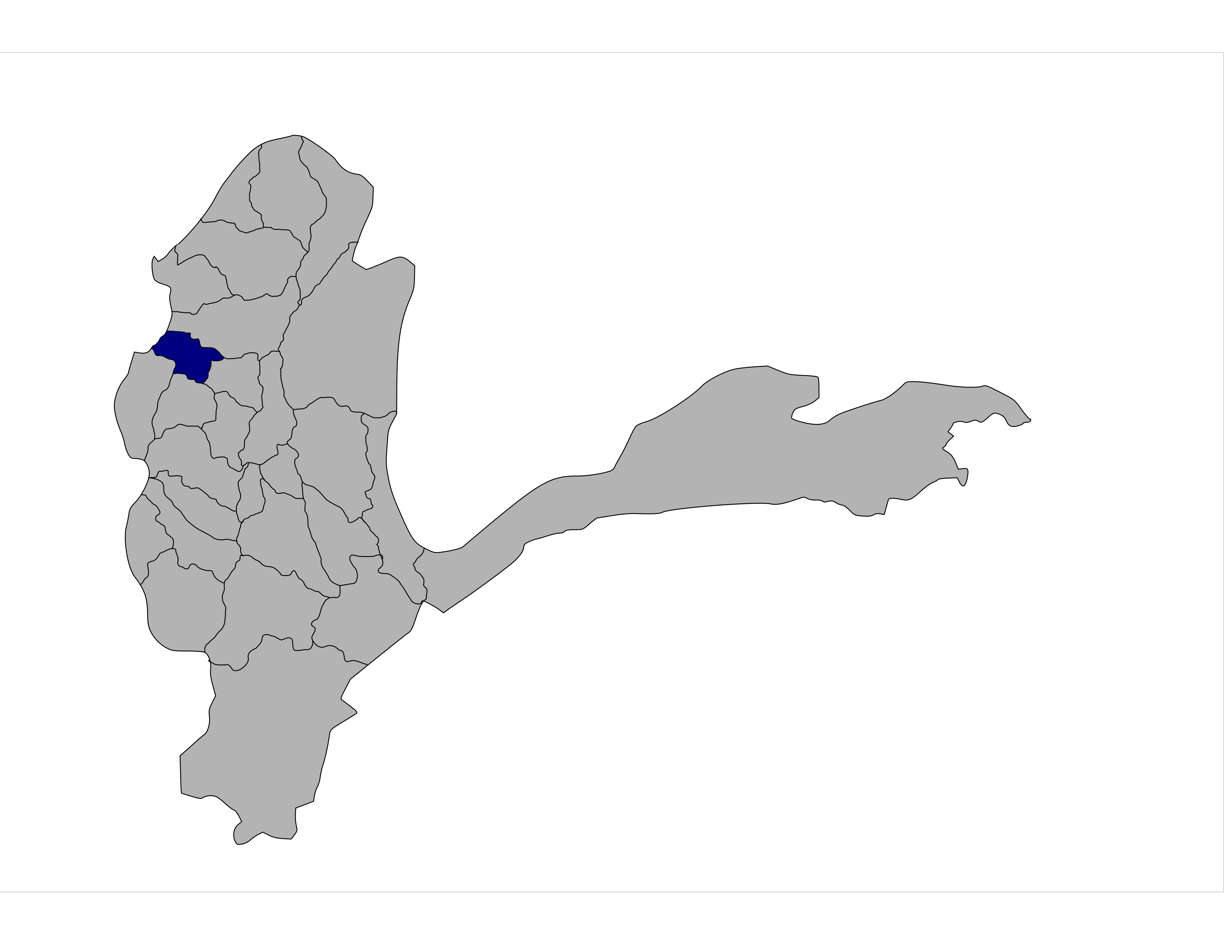
- Yawan District was formed within Ragh District in 2005
- Country: Afghanistan
- Province: Badakhshan

Government
  - Type: District council

Population
  - Estimate (2019): 36,037

Yawan (Dari: یاوان) is one of the 28 districts of Badakhshan province in eastern Afghanistan. It was created in 2005 from part of the Ragh District and is home to approximately 36,037 residents.

== See also ==
- Ragh District
