= Ministry of Transport and Civil Aviation (Afghanistan) =

Aviation authority of Afghanistan

Afghan Ministry of Transport and Civil Aviation
- (Dari: وزارت ترانسپورت و هوانوردی ملکی افغانستان) (Pashto: د افغانستان د ترانسپورټ او ملکي هوايي چلند وزارت)
- Ministry seal

- Ministry flag

Agency overview
- Jurisdiction: Government of Afghanistan
- Headquarters: Road Entrance 14 Wazir Akbar Khan, Kabul, Afghanistan
- Minister responsible: Hamidullah Akhundzada
- Website: https://mot.gov.af/en

The Afghan Ministry of Transport and Civil Aviation (Pashto: د ترانسپورټ او ملکي هوايي چلند وزارت, Dari: وزارت ترانسپورت افغانستان) is the Afghan Government Ministry in charge of the management of air and ground transportation, operation of airports and the national airline, as well as numerous other state-owned enterprises engaged in the transport business. As of 2021 the minister is Hamidullah Akhundzada.

It is headquartered in Ansari Watt, Kabul.

Former logo of this ministry in 2018.

During the Afghan Interim Administration, Afghanistan had one minister for Transport and one minister for Civil Aviation & Tourism. In 2004, during the presidency of Hamid Karzai, the post of minister for Civil Aviation & Tourism was abolished. The minister of Transport became responsible for Civil Aviation and the Minister of Information and culture became responsible for Tourism.

Under the Islamic Emirate of Afghanistan, the ministry has outsourced operation of Afghanistan's airspace and airports to the United Arab Emirates firm GAAC Holding.

== Ministers ==
Portofolio	Name	Term	Notes
	Akhtar Mansour	September 1996 – December 2001	Under the Islamic Emirate of Afghanistan
Civil Aviation & Tourism	Abdul Rahman	December 2001 – February 2002	Was assassinated in February 2002
Transportation	Sultan Hamid Sultan	December 2001 – June 2002	
Civil Aviation & Tourism	Zalmai Rassoul	February 2002 – June 2002	
Civil Aviation & Tourism	Mirwais Sadiq	June 2002 – March 2004	Was killed in March 2004 during an exchange of fire in Herat between his forces and those of Zahir Nayebzada
Transportation	Sayed Mohammed Ali Jawad	June 2002 – December 2004	
Transportation & Civil Aviation	Enayatullah Qasemi	December 2004 – March 2006	
Transportation & Civil Aviation	Gul Hussein Ahmadi	March 2006 – August 2006	Ahmadi did not receive the necessary confidence of the Wolesi Jirga, the Lower house of the Afghan parliament.
Transportation & Civil Aviation	Nimatullah Ehsan Javid	August 2006 – March 2008	Was dismissed in part because of problems with the corruption-plagued national carrier, Ariana Airlines
Transportation & Civil Aviation	Hamidullah Qaderi	March 2008 – November 2008	Was fired by president Karzai on the charge that Qaderi had mishandled preparations for 2008 Hajj travel
Transportation & Civil Aviation	Omar Zakhilwal	November 2008 – February 2009	Only acting minister
Transportation & Civil Aviation	Hamidullah Farooqi	February 2009 – January 2010	
Transportation & Civil Aviation	Mohammadullah Batash	January 2010 – June 2010	Did not receive a vote of confidence from the Wolesi Jirga, but after his successor also failed to receive a vote of confidence, Karzai appointed him as acting minister
Transportation & Civil Aviation	Abdul Rahim Horas	January 2010 – January 2010	Did not receive a vote of confidence from the Wolesi Jirga
Transportation & Civil Aviation	Daoud Ali Najafi	June 2010 – March 2012	Did not receive a vote of confidence from the Wolesi Jirga, but was subsequently named as acting minister
Transportation & Civil Aviation	Daoud Ali Najafi	March 2012 – 2015	Was again named by President Karzai and this time approved by the Afghan Parliament and therefore from March 2012 a formally approved minister
Transportation & Civil Aviation	Muhammad Hamid Tahmasi	2017 – August 2021	Was named by President Ghani and approved by the Afghan Parliament
Civil Aviation & Transport	Hamidullah Akhundzada	7 September 2021 –Present	Appointed as acting minister for the Islamic Emirate of Afghanistan

Former Minister of Transportation and Civil Aviation (MoTCA):

- Abdul Rahman (20020211 killed),
- Dr. Enayatullah Qasemi (Ghazni 2005),
- Gul Hussain Ahmadi (not confirmed by Wolesi Jirga 2006,
- Engineer Nehmatullah Niamatullah Ehsan Javid (2006),
- Hamidullah Qaderi (2008),
- Dr. Omar Zakhiwal Zakhaiwal (2008),
- acting-transport minister, Raz Mohammad Elmi (2009),
- Hamidullah Farooqi (20090317),
- Daud Ali Najafi (acting Minister 20101009 and nominated again (20120215)
- Daud Ali Najafi Minister of Transport and Civil Aviation (20120305 - 20140930)
- Daud Ali Najafi acting Minister (20141001)
- acting Minister of Transport Ghulam Ali Rasukh (20141209)
- Minister of Transport and Aviation (20150418, 20161113 impeached and acting)
- Mohammad Hamid Tumasi Hamid Tahmasi Mohammad Hamid Tahmasi (20170725, 20180625), 20171102, 20171204 confirmed, 20180629)
- Quadratullah Zaki nominated and acting (20200831) confirmed (20201130)
- Mullah Alhaj Hamidullah Akhundzada (20210907)

Deputy Minister of Transport and Aviation:

- Hafiz Siddiqullah Abdid (20220912)
- Mullah Abdul Salam (20220913)
- Ghulam Jelani Popal, the deputy head of Afghanistan transport and civil aviation ministry (20230510)

Deputy Minister of Transport and Aviation Financial Affairs:

- Hafiz Siddiqullah Abdid (20220912)

Deputy Ministers: Technical and Operations:

- Cptn. Said Mehdi Saidi, Saeedi (20110313, 20110415)

Planning and Policy:

- Mohammad Aminullah Batash (20110313)

Administration and Ressources:

- Ghulam Ali Rasikh (20110313);

Deputy of the Ministry of Transport, Finance and Administration:

- Mrs. Fawzia Ehsani (2016, 20180214)

Deputy Transport and Civil Aviation Minister:

- Hamid Zahir (20120704)

Deputy minister, Raz Mohammad Ilmi, and deputy minister of transport, Abdul Hafiz, were arrested over allegations of corruption (20170712)
